= List of village-level divisions of Shandong =

Location of Shandong province in China

This is a list of village-level divisions of the province of Shandong, People's Republic of China (PRC). After province, prefecture, county-level divisions, and township-level divisions, village-level divisions constitute the formal fifth-level administrative divisions of the PRC. There are a total of 1,858 such divisions in Shandong, divided into 500 subdistricts, 1,091 towns, one ethnic town, and 266 townships. This list is divided first into the prefecture-level cities then the county-level divisions then township-level divisions.

== Jinan ==
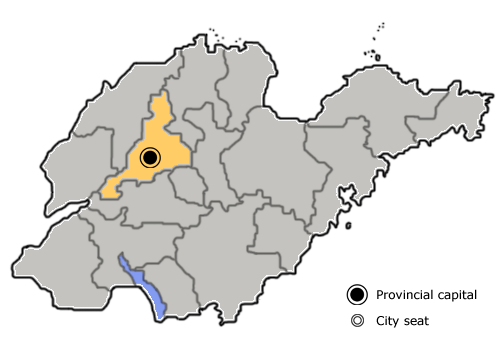
Location of Jinan City in the province

=== Changqing District ===
Subdistricts:

- Wenchang Avenue Subdistrict (文昌街街道), Guyunhu Subdistrict (崮云湖街道), Ping'an Subdistrict (平安街道), Wufengshan Subdistrict (五峰山街道)

Towns:

- Guide (归德镇), Xiaoli (孝里镇), Wande (万德镇), Zhangxia (张夏镇), Mashan (马山镇)

The only township is Shuangquan Township (双泉乡)

=== Huaiyin District ===
Subdistricts:

- Zhenxing Avenue Subdistrict (振兴街街道), Zhongdahuaishu Subdistrict (中大槐树街道), Daode Avenue Subdistrict (道德街街道), Xishichang Subdistrict (西市场街道), Wuligou Subdistrict (五里沟街道), Yingshi Avenue Subdistrict (营市街街道), Qingnian Park Subdistrict (青年公园街道), Nanxinzhuang Subdistrict (南辛庄街道), Duandian North Road Subdistrict (段店北路街道), Zhangzhuang Road Subdistrict (张庄路街道), Kuangshan Subdistrict (匡山街道), Meilihu Subdistrict (美里湖街道)

Towns:

- Wujiabao (吴家堡镇), Duandian (段店镇)

=== Licheng District ===
Subdistricts:

- Shanda Road Subdistrict (山大路街道), Hongjialou Subdistrict (洪家楼街道), Dongfeng Subdistrict (东风街道), Quanfu Subdistrict (全福街道), Suncun Subdistrict (孙村街道), Juyehe Subdistrict (巨野河街道)

Towns:

- Zhonggong (仲宫镇), Ganggou (港沟镇), Liubu (柳埠镇), Guodian (郭店镇), Dongjia (董家镇), Tangwang (唐王镇), Yaoqiang (遥墙镇), Wangsheren (王舍人镇), Huashan (华山镇), Xiying (西营镇), Caishi (彩石镇)

=== Lixia District ===
Subdistricts:

- Jiefang Road Subdistrict (解放路街道), Qianfoshan Subdistrict (千佛山街道), Botuquan Subdistrict (趵突泉街道), Quancheng Road Subdistrict (泉城路街道), Daminghu Subdistrict (大明湖街道), Dongguan Subdistrict (东关街道), Wendong Subdistrict (文东街道), Jianxin Subdistrict (建新街道), Dianliu Subdistrict (甸柳街道), Yanshan Subdistrict (燕山街道), Yaojia Subdistrict (姚家街道), Longdong Subdistrict (龙洞街道), Zhiyuan Subdistrict (智远街道)

=== Shizhong District, Jinan ===
Subdistricts:

- Daguanyuan Subdistrict (大观园街道), Ganshiqiao Subdistrict (杆石桥街道), Silicun Subdistrict (四里村街道), Weijiazhuang Subdistrict (魏家庄街道), Erqi Subdistrict (二七街道), Qilishan Subdistrict (七里山街道), Liulishan Subdistrict (六里山街道), Shunyu Road Subdistrict (舜玉路街道), Luoyuan Subdistrict (泺源街道), Wangguanzhuang Subdistrict (王官庄街道), Shungeng Subdistrict (舜耕街道), Baimashan Subdistrict (白马山街道), Qixian Subdistrict (七贤街道), Shiliulihe Subdistrict (十六里河街道), Xinglong Subdistrict (兴隆街道), Dangjia Subdistrict (党家街道), Dougou Subdistrict (陡沟街道)

=== Tianqiao District ===
Subdistricts:

- Wuyingshan Subdistrict (无影山街道), Tianqiao East Avenue Subdistrict (天桥东街街道), Beicun Subdistrict (北村街道), Nancun Subdistrict (南村街道), Dikou Road Subdistrict (堤口路街道), Beitan Subdistrict (北坦街道), Zhijinshi Subdistrict (制锦市街道), Baohua Subdistrict (宝华街道), Guanzhaying Subdistrict (官扎营街道), Weibei Road Subdistrict (纬北路街道), Yaoshan Subdistrict (药山街道), Beiyuan Subdistrict (北园街道), Luokou Subdistrict (泺口街道)

Towns:

- Sangzidian (桑梓店镇), Daqiao Subdistrict (大桥街道)

=== Zhangqiu ===
Subdistricts:

- Mingshui Subdistrict (明水街道), Shuangshan Subdistrict (双山街道), Zaoyuan Subdistrict (枣园街道), Longshan Subdistrict (龙山街道), Bucun Subdistrict (埠村街道), Shengjing Subdistrict (圣井街道)

Towns:

- Puji (普集镇), Xiuhui (绣惠镇), Xiangsongzhuang (相公庄镇), Duozhuang (垛庄镇), Shuizhai (水寨镇), Wenzu (文祖镇), Diao (刁镇), Caofan (曹范镇), Baiyunhu (白云湖镇), Gaoguanzhai (高官寨镇), Ningjiabu (宁家埠镇)

Townships:

- Guanzhuang Township (官庄乡), Xinzhai Township (辛寨乡), Huanghe Township (黄河乡)

=== Jiyang County ===
Subdistricts:

- Jiyang Subdistrict (济阳街道), Jibei Subdistrict (济北街道)

Towns:

- Duoshi (垛石镇), Sungeng (孙耿镇), Qudi (曲堤镇), Renfeng (仁风镇), Cuizhai (崔寨镇), Taiping (太平镇), Huihe (回河镇), Xinshi (新市镇)

=== Pingyin County ===
Towns:

- Pingyin (平阴镇), Dong'e (东阿镇), Xiaozhi (孝直镇), Kongcun (孔村镇), Hongfanchi (洪范池镇), Meigui (玫瑰镇)

The only township is Ancheng Township (安城乡)

=== Shanghe County ===
Subdistricts:

- Xushang Subdistrict (许商街道), Yuhuangmiao Subdistrict (玉皇庙街道)

Towns:

- Yinxiang (殷巷镇), Huairen (怀仁镇), Longsangsi (龙桑寺镇), Zhenglu (郑路镇), Jiazhuang (贾庄镇)

Townships:

- Sunji Township (孙集乡), Shahe Township (沙河乡), Hanmiao Township (韩庙乡), Zhangfang Township (张坊乡), Baiqiao Township (白桥乡)

== Qingdao ==
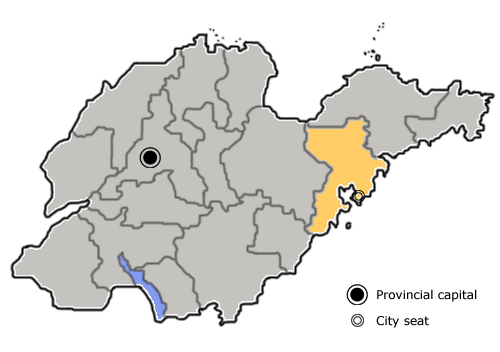
Location of Qingdao City in the province

=== Chengyang District ===
Subdistricts:

- Chengyang Subdistrict (城阳街道), Xiazhuang Subdistrict (夏庄街道), Liuting Subdistrict (流亭街道), Jihongtan Subdistrict (棘洪滩街道), Shangma Subdistrict (上马街道), Hongdao Subdistrict (红岛街道), Hetao Subdistrict (河套街道), Xifuzhen Subdistrict (惜福镇街道)

=== Huangdao District ===
Subdistricts:

- Huangdao Subdistrict (黄岛街道), Xin'an Subdistrict (辛安街道), Xuejiadao Subdistrict (薛家岛街道), Lingzhushan Subdistrict (灵珠山街道), Changjiang Road Subdistrict (长江路街道), Hongshiya Subdistrict (红石崖街道), Zhushan Subdistrict (珠山街道), Zhuhai Subdistrict (珠海街道), Yinzhu Subdistrict (隐珠街道), Lingshanwei Subdistrict (灵山卫街道), Tieshan Subdistrict (铁山街道), Binhai Subdistrict (滨海街道)

Towns:

- Langya (琅琊镇), Poli (泊里镇), Dachang (大场镇), Dacun (大村镇), Liuwang (六汪镇), Wangtai (王台镇), Zhangjialou (张家楼镇), Haiqing (海青镇), Baoshan (宝山镇), Zangnan (藏南镇), Liwuguan (理务关镇)

=== Laoshan District ===
Subdistricts:

- Zhonghan Subdistrict (中韩街道), Shazikou Subdistrict (沙子口街道), Wanggezhuang Subdistrict (王哥庄街道), Beizhai Subdistrict (北宅街道)

=== Licang District ===
Subdistricts:

- Zhenhua Road Subdistrict (振华路街道), Yongqing Road Subdistrict (永清路街道), Yong'an Road Subdistrict (永安路街道), Xinghua Road Subdistrict (兴华路街道), Xingcheng Road Subdistrict (兴城路街道), Licun Subdistrict (李村街道), Hushan Road Subdistrict (虎山路街道), Fushan Road Subdistrict (浮山路街道), Jiushui Road Subdistrict (九水路街道), Xiangtan Road Subdistrict (湘潭路街道), Loushan Subdistrict (楼山街道)

=== Shibei District ===
Subdistricts:

- Liaoning Road Subdistrict (辽宁路街道), Yan'an Road Subdistrict (延安路街道), Huayang Road Subdistrict (华阳路街道), Dengzhou Road Subdistrict (登州路街道), Ningxia Road Subdistrict (宁夏路街道), Dunhua Road Subdistrict (敦化路街道), Liaoyuan Road Subdistrict (辽源路街道), Hefei Road Subdistrict (合肥路街道), Xiaogang Subdistrict (小港街道), Dagang Subdistrict (大港街道), Jimo Road Subdistrict (即墨路街道), Taidong Subdistrict (台东街道), Zhenjiang Road Subdistrict (镇江路街道), Hongshanpo Subdistrict (洪山坡街道), Tong'an Road Subdistrict (同安路街道), Fushan New Area Subdistrict (浮山新区街道), Fuxin Road Subdistrict (阜新路街道), Hailun Road Subdistrict (海伦路街道), Jiaxing Road Subdistrict (嘉兴路街道), Xinglong Road Subdistrict (兴隆路街道), Shuiqinggou Subdistrict (水清沟街道), Luoyang Road Subdistrict (洛阳路街道), Hexi Subdistrict (河西街道)

=== Shinan District ===
Subdistricts:

- Central Hong Kong Road Subdistrict (香港中路街道), Badaxia Subdistrict (八大峡街道), Taixi Subdistrict (台西街道), Yunnan Road Subdistrict (云南路街道), Zhongshan Road Subdistrict (中山路街道), Guanhai Road Subdistrict (观海路街道), Jiangsu Road Subdistrict (江苏路街道), Jinkou Road Subdistrict (金口路街道), Badaguan Subdistrict (八大关街道), Zhanshan Subdistrict (湛山街道), Jinhu Road Subdistrict (金湖路街道), Badahu Subdistrict (八大湖街道), Jinmen Road Subdistrict (金门路街道), Zhuhai Road Subdistrict (珠海路街道)

=== Jiaozhou ===
Subdistricts:

- Fu'an Subdistrict (阜安街道), Zhongyun Subdistrict (中云街道), Beiguan Subdistrict (北关街道), Sanlihe Subdistrict (三里河街道), Yunxi Subdistrict (云溪街道), Yinghai Subdistrict (营海街道), Jiaodong Subdistrict (胶东街道)

Towns:

- Madian (马店镇), Ligezhuang (李哥庄镇), Puji (铺集镇), Zhangying (张应镇), Licha (里岔镇), Jiaoxi (胶西镇), Yanghe (洋河镇), Jiulong (九龙镇), Ducun (杜村镇), Jiaobei (胶北镇)

=== Jimo ===
Subdistricts:

- Huanxiu Subdistrict (环秀街道), Chaohai Subdistrict (潮海街道), Tongji Subdistrict (通济街道), Bei'an Subdistrict (北安街道), Longshan Subdistrict (龙山街道)

Towns:

- Aoshanwei (鳌山卫镇), Wenquan (温泉镇), Longquan (龙泉镇), Liujiazhuang (刘家庄镇), Lancun (蓝村镇), Dianji (店集镇), Lingshan (灵山镇), Qiji (七级镇), Wangcun (王村镇), Fengcheng (丰城镇), Duanbolan (段泊岚镇), Yifengdian (移风店镇), Pudong (普东镇), Daxin (大信镇), Tianheng (田横镇), Jinkou (金口镇), Huashan (华山镇), Nanquan (南泉镇)

=== Laixi ===
Subdistricts:

- Shuiji Subdistrict (水集街道), Wangcheng Subdistrict (望城街道), Longshui Subdistrict (龙水街道), Meihuashan Subdistrict (梅花山街道), Binhe Road Subdistrict (滨河路街道), Guhe Subdistrict (沽河街道)

Towns:

- Sunshou (孙受镇), Jiangshan (姜山镇), Xiagezhuang (夏格庄镇), Yuanshang (院上镇), Rizhuang (日庄镇), Nanshu (南墅镇), Hetoudian (河头店镇), Dianbu (店埠镇), Liquanzhuang (李权庄镇), Wubei (武备镇), Malianzhuang (马连庄镇)

=== Pingdu ===
Subdistricts:

- 东阁街道, Liyuan Subdistrict (李园街道), Tonghe Subdistrict (同和街道), 凤台街道, 白沙河街道

Towns:

- 南村镇 蓼兰镇 崔家集镇 明村镇 田庄镇 新河镇 店子镇 大泽山镇 旧店镇 云山镇 古岘镇 仁兆镇

Others: Pingdu Export-Oriented Processing Industries District (平度外向型工业加工区)

==== 南村镇 ====
Community:

- 三城社区

Villages:

- 东南街村 东北街村 西南街村 西北街村 后斜子村 大西头东村 大西头中村 大西头西村 前北村 后北村 柏家寨村 辛庄村 堐头村 李家庄村 徐家庄村 荆家埠后村 杜戈庄村 西王府庄村 东王府庄村 宗家埠村 杨家庄村 姜家寨村 苏子埠村 洪兰北村 洪兰中村 洪兰西村 洪兰东村 北顶子村 姜家埠村 桃园村 沙梁东村 沙梁中村 沙梁西村 沙梁南村 九甲村 庄干村 亭兰丘东南街村 亭兰丘东北街村 亭兰丘西北街村 亭兰丘西南街村 南吴家屯村 黄丘村 东朱家庄村 小亭兰丘村 大高家庄村 小高家庄村 大庞家庄村 小庞家庄村 河上庄村 江家庄村 范家屯村 小洪兰村

== Binzhou ==
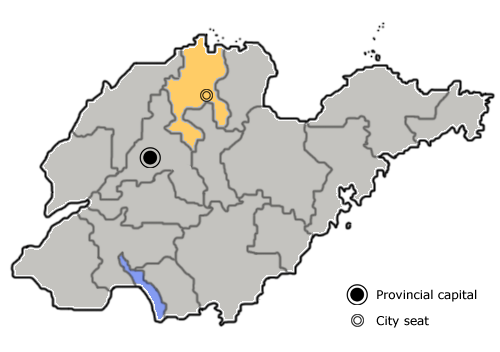
Location of Binzhou City in the province

=== Bincheng District ===
Subdistricts:

- Shizhong Subdistrict (市中街道), Shixi Subdistrict (市西街道), Beizhen Subdistrict (北镇街道), Shidong Subdistrict (市东街道), Pengli Subdistrict (彭李街道), Xiaoying Subdistrict (小营街道), Binbei Subdistrict (滨北街道), Liangcai Subdistrict (梁才街道), Dudian Subdistrict (杜店街道), Shahe Subdistrict (沙河街道), Lize Subdistrict (里则街道)

Towns:

- Jiuzhen (旧镇镇), Baoji (堡集镇)

Townships:

- Shangji Township (尚集乡), Qinhuangtai Township (秦皇台乡)

=== Boxing County ===
Subdistricts:

- Chengdong Subdistrict (城东街道), Jinqiu Subdistrict (锦秋街道), Bochang Subdistrict (博昌街道)

Towns:

- Caowang (曹王镇), Xingfu (兴福镇), Chenhu (陈户镇), Hubin (湖滨镇), Dianzi (店子镇), Lüyi (吕艺镇), Chunhua (纯化镇), Pangjia (庞家镇), Qiaozhuang (乔庄镇)

=== Huimin County ===
Subdistricts:

- Sunwu Subdistrict (孙武街道), Wudingfu Subdistrict (武定府街道), Hefang Subdistrict (何坊街道)

Towns:

- Shimiao (石庙镇), Sangluoshu (桑落墅镇), Zijiao (淄角镇), Huji (胡集镇), Lizhuang (李庄镇), Madian (麻店镇), Weiji (魏集镇), Qinghe (清河镇), Jianglou (姜楼镇), Xindian (辛店镇), Danianchen (大年陈镇), Zaohuli (皂户李镇)

=== Wudi County ===
Subdistricts:

- Difeng Subdistrict (棣丰街道), Haifeng Subdistrict (海丰街道)

Towns:

- Shuiwan (水湾镇), Jieshishan (碣石山镇), Xiaobotou (小泊头镇), Chengkou (埕口镇), Mashanzi (马山子镇), Chewang (车王镇), Liubao (柳堡镇), Shejia (佘家镇)

Townships:

- Xinyang Township (信阳乡), Xixiaowang Township (西小王乡)

=== Yangxin County ===
Towns:

- Yangxin (阳信镇), Shangdian (商店镇), Wendian (温店镇), Heliu (河流镇), Zhaiwang (翟王镇), Liupowu (流坡坞镇)

Townships:

- Sudian Township (劳店乡), Shuitapo Township (水落坡乡), Yanghu Township (洋湖乡)

=== Zhanhua County ===
Subdistricts:

- Fuguo Subdistrict (富国街道), Fuyuan Subdistrict (富源街道)

Towns:

- Xiawa (下洼镇), Gucheng (古城镇), Fengjia (冯家镇), Botou (泊头镇), Dagao (大高镇)

Townships:

- Huangsheng Township (黄升乡), Binhai Township (滨海乡), Xiahe Township (下河乡), Liguo Township (利国乡), Haifang Township (海防乡)

=== Zouping County ===
Subdistricts:

- Daixi Subdistrict (黛溪街道), Huangshan Subdistrict (黄山街道), Gaoxin Subdistrict (高新街道)

Towns:

- Changshan (长山镇), Weiqiao (魏桥镇), Xidong (西董镇), Haosheng (好生镇), Linchi (临池镇), Jiaoqiao (焦桥镇), Handian (韩店镇), Sunzhen (孙镇镇), Jiuhu (九户镇), Qingyang (青阳镇), Mingji (明集镇), Taizi (台子镇), Matou (码头镇)

== Dezhou ==
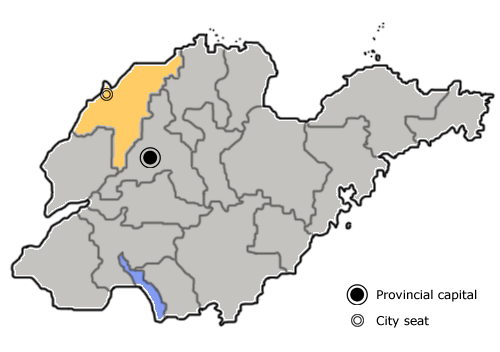
Location of Dezhou City in the province

=== Decheng District ===
Subdistricts:

- Xinhu Subdistrict (新湖街道), Xinhua Subdistrict (新华街道), Tianqu Subdistrict (天衢街道), Dongdi Subdistrict (东地街道), Yunhe Subdistrict (运河街道), Songguantun Subdistrict (宋官屯街道), Changhe Subdistrict 长河街道)

Towns:

- Ertun (二屯镇), Huangheya (黄河涯镇), Zhaohu (赵虎镇)

Townships:

- Taitousi Township (抬头寺乡), Yuanqiao Township (袁桥乡)

=== Laoling ===
Subdistricts:

- Shizhong Subdistrict (市中街道), Hujia Subdistrict (胡家街道), Yunhong Subdistrict (云红街道),

Guojia Subdistrict (郭家街道)

Towns:

- Yang'an (杨安镇), Zhuji (朱集镇), Huangjia (黄夹镇), Dingwu (丁坞镇), Huayuan (花园镇), Zhengdian (郑店镇), Hualou (化楼镇), Kong (孔镇)

Townships:

- Xiduan Township (西段乡), Dasun Township (大孙乡), Tieying Township (铁营乡), Zhaitoubao Township (寨头堡乡)

=== Yucheng ===
The only subdistrict is Shizhong Subdistrict (市中街道)

Towns:

- Lun (伦镇), Fangsi (房寺镇), Zhangzhuang (张庄镇), Xindian (辛店镇), Anren (安仁镇), Xinzhai (辛寨镇), Liangjia (梁家镇)

Townships:

- Litun Township (李屯乡), Shiliwang Township (十里望乡), Juzhen Township (莒镇乡)

=== Ling County ===
Subdistricts:

- Ande Subdistrict (安德街道), Linji Subdistrict (临齐街道)

Towns:

- Zhengjiazhai (郑家寨镇), Mi (糜镇), Songjia (宋家镇), Weiwangzhuang (徽王庄镇), Shentou (神头镇), Zi (滋镇), Qiansun (前孙镇), Bianlin (边临镇), Yidukou (义渡口镇), Dingzhuang (丁庄镇)

The only township is Yuji Township (于集乡)

=== Linyi County ===
Subdistricts:

- Xingdong Subdistrict (邢侗街道), Hengyuan Subdistrict (恒源街道), Liupan Subdistrict (临盘街道)

Towns:

- Linyi (临邑镇), Linnan (临南镇), Deping (德平镇), Linzi (林子镇), Xinglong (兴隆镇), Mengsi (孟寺镇), Cuijia (翟家镇), Lihewu (理合务镇)

The only township is Su'an Township (宿安乡)

=== Ningjin County ===
Towns:

- Ningjin (宁津镇), Chaihudian (柴胡店镇), Changguan (长官镇), Duji (杜集镇), Baodian (保店镇), Daliu (大柳镇), Dacao (大曹镇), Xiangya (相衙镇), Shiji (时集镇)

Townships:

- Zhangdazhuang Township (张大庄乡), Liuyingwu Township (刘营伍乡)

=== Pingyuan County ===
Subdistricts:

- Longmen Subdistrict (龙门街道), Taoyuan Subdistrict (桃园街道)

Towns:

- Wangfenglou (王凤楼镇), Qiancao (前曹镇), Encheng (恩城镇), Wangmiao (王庙镇), Wanggaopu (王杲铺镇), Zhanghua (张华镇), Jiaozhan (腰站镇)

Townships:

- Fangzi Township (坊子乡), Wangdagua Township (王打卦乡), Santang Township (三唐乡)

=== Qihe County ===
Towns:

- Yancheng (晏城镇), Biaobaisi (表白寺镇), Jiaomiao (焦庙镇), Zhaoguan (赵官镇), Zhu'e (祝阿镇), Renliji (仁里集镇), Pandian (潘店镇), Huguantun (胡官屯镇), Xuanzhangtun (宣章屯镇)

Townships:

- Huadian Township (华店乡), Antou Township (安头乡), Maji Township (马集乡), Liuqiao Township (刘桥乡), Dahuang Township (大黄乡)

=== Qingyun County ===
The only subdistrict is Bohai Road Subdistrict (渤海路街道)

Towns:

- Qingyun (庆云镇), Changjia (常家镇), Shangtang (尚堂镇), Cuikou (崔口镇)

Townships:

- Yanwu Township (严务乡), Dongxindian Township (东辛店乡), Zhongding Township (中丁乡), Xuyuanzi Township (徐园子乡)

=== Wucheng County ===
The only subdistrict is Guangyun Subdistrict (广运街道)

Towns:

- Wucheng (武城镇), Laocheng (老城镇), Luquantun (鲁权屯镇), Haowangzhuang (郝王庄镇)

Townships:

- Yangzhuang Township (杨庄乡), Lijiahu Township (李家户乡), Jiamaying Township (甲马营乡)

=== Xiajin County ===
Subdistricts:

- Yincheng Subdistrict (银城街道), Beicheng Subdistrict (北城街道)

Towns:

- Nancheng (南城镇), Suliuzhuang (苏留庄镇), Xinshengdian (新盛店镇), Leiji (雷集镇), Zhengbaotun (郑保屯镇), Baimahu (白马湖镇), Dongliguantun (东李官屯镇), Songlou (宋楼镇), Xiangzhaozhuang (香赵庄镇), Shuangmiao (双庙镇)

Townshisp:

- Dukouyi Township (渡口驿乡), Tianzhuang Township (田庄乡)

== Dongying ==
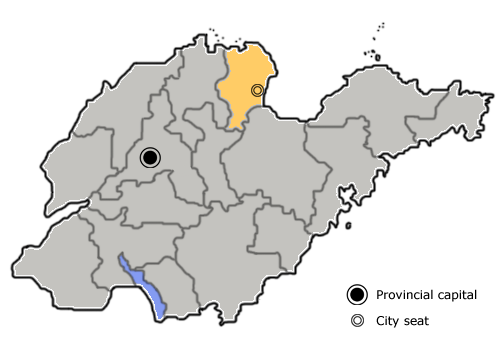
Location of Dongying City in the province

=== Dongying District ===
Subdistricts:

- Wenhui Subdistrict (文汇街道), Huanghe Road Subdistrict (黄河路街道), Dongcheng Subdistrict (东城街道), Xindian Subdistrict (辛店街道), Shengli Subdistrict (胜利街道), Shengyuan Subdistrict (胜园街道)

Towns:

- Niuzhuang (牛庄镇), Liuhu (六户镇), Shikou (史口镇), Longju (龙居镇)

=== Hekou District ===
The only subdistrict is Hekou Subdistrict (河口街道)

Towns:

- Yihe (义和镇), Xianhe (仙河镇), Gudao (孤岛镇)

Townships:

- Xinhu Township (新户乡), Taiping Township (太平乡), Liuhe Township (六合乡)

=== Guangrao County ===
Towns:

- Guangrao (广饶镇), Dawang (大王镇), Daozhuang (稻庄镇), Shicun (石村镇), Dingzhuang (丁庄镇), Lique (李鹊镇)

Townships:

- Damatou Township (大码头乡), Xiliuqiao Township (西刘桥乡), Huaguan Township (花官乡), Chenguan Township (陈官乡)

=== Kenli County ===
Subdistricts:

- Kenli Subdistrict (垦利街道), Xinglong Subdistrict (兴隆街道)

Towns:

- Shengtuo (胜坨镇), Haojia (郝家镇), Yong'an (永安镇), Huanghekou (黄河口镇)

The only township is Dongji Township (董集乡)

=== Lijin County ===
Towns:

- Lijin (利津镇), Beisong (北宋镇), Yanwo (盐窝镇), Chenzhuang (陈庄镇), Tingluo (汀罗镇)

Townships:

- Mingji Township (明集乡), Beiling Township (北岭乡), Hutan Township (虎滩乡), Diaokou Township (刁口乡)

== Heze ==
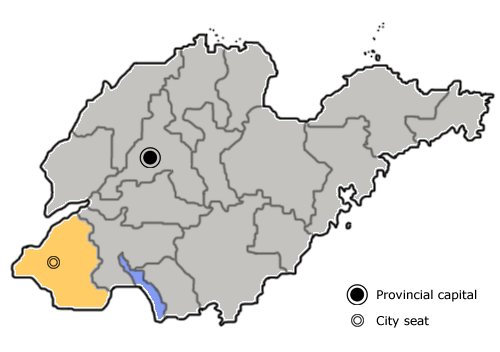
Location of Heze City in the province

=== Mudan District ===
Subdistricts:

- Dongcheng Subdistrict (东城街道), Xicheng Subdistrict (西城街道), Nancheng Subdistrict (南城街道), Beicheng Subdistrict (北城街道), Mudan Subdistrict (牡丹街道), Danyang Subdistrict (丹阳街道 ), Yuecheng Subdistrict (岳程街道), Dianhutun Subdistrict (佃户屯街道), Helou Subdistrict (何楼街道), Wanfu Subdistrict (万福街道)

Towns:

- Shatu (沙土镇), Wudian (吴店镇), Wangjietun (王浩屯镇), Huanggang (黄堽镇), Dusi (都司镇), Gaozhuang (高庄镇), Xiaoliu (小留镇), Licun (李村镇), Malinggang (马岭岗镇), Anxing (安兴镇), Dahuangji (大黄集镇), Lüling (吕陵镇)

Townshisp:

- Huji Township (胡集乡), Huangzhen Township (皇镇乡)

=== Cao County ===
Subdistricts:

- Chengguan Subdistrict (城关街道), Panshi Subdistrict (磐石街道), Qinghe Subdistrict (青菏街道)

Towns:

- Zhuangzhai (庄寨镇), Pulianji (普连集镇), Qingguji (青固集镇), Taoyuanji (桃源集镇), Hanji (韩集镇), Zhuanmiao (砖庙镇), Guyingji (古营集镇), Weiwan (魏湾镇), Houji Hui Town (侯集回族镇), Suji (苏集镇), Sunlaojia (孙老家镇), Gedianlou (阎店楼镇), Liangditou (梁堤头镇), Ancailou (安才楼镇), Shaozhuang (邵庄镇), Wangji (王集镇)

Townships:

- Qinggangji Township (青岗集乡), Changleji Township (常乐集乡), Niji Township (倪集乡), Louzhuang Township (楼庄乡), Zhengzhuang Township (郑庄乡), Daji Township (大集乡), Niuhongmiao Township (朱洪庙乡), Wulou Township (仵楼乡)

=== Chengwu County ===
Towns:

- Chengwu (成武镇), Datianji (大田集镇), Tiangongmiao (天宫庙镇), Wenshangji (汶上集镇), Nanluji (南鲁集镇), Boleji (伯乐集镇), Goucunji (苟村集镇), Baifutu (白浮图镇), Sunsi (孙寺镇), Jiunüji (九女集镇)

Townships:

- Dangji Township (党集乡), Zhanglou Township (张楼乡)

=== Dingtao County ===
Towns:

- Dingtao (定陶镇), Chenji (陈集镇), Rangu (冉固镇), Zhangwan (张湾镇), Huangdian (黄店镇), Menghai (孟海镇), Maji (马集镇)

Townships:

- Fangshan Township (仿山乡), Nanwangdian Township (南王店乡), Bandi Township (半堤乡), Dutang Township (杜堂乡)

=== Dongming County ===
Towns:

- Chengguan (城关镇), Dongmingji (东明集镇), Liulou (刘楼镇), Luquan (陆圈镇), Matou (马头镇), Sanchunji (三春集镇), Datun (大屯镇)

Townships:

- Wushengqiao Township (武胜桥乡), Caiyuanji Township (菜园集乡), Xiaojing Township (小井乡), Shawo Township (沙窝乡), Changxingji Township (长兴集乡), Jiaoyuan Township (焦园乡)

=== Juancheng County ===
Towns:

- Juancheng (鄄城镇), Shiji (什集镇), Hongchuan (红船镇), Jiucheng (旧城镇), Yanshi (闫什镇), Jishan (箕山镇), Lijinshitang (李进士堂镇), Dongkou (董口镇), Linpu (临濮镇), Penglou (彭楼镇)

Townships:

- Zuoying Township (左营乡), Danian Township (大埝乡), Yinma Township (引马乡), Fenghuang Township (凤凰乡), Fuchun Township (富春乡), Zhengying Township (郑营乡)

=== Juye County ===
Subdistricts:

- Fenghuang Subdistrict (凤凰街道), Yongfeng Subdistrict (永丰街道)

Towns:

- Longgu (龙固镇), Dayi (大义镇), Liulin (柳林镇), Zhangfeng (章缝镇), Daxieji (大谢集镇), Dushan (独山镇), Qilin (麒麟镇), Hetaoyuan (核桃园镇), Tianzhuang (田庄镇), Taiping (太平镇), Wanfeng (万丰镇), Taomiao (陶庙镇), Dongguantun (董官屯镇), Tianqiao (田桥镇), Yingli (营里镇)

=== Shan County ===
Subdistricts:

- Beicheng Subdistrict (北城街道), Nancheng Subdistrict (南城街道), Yuanyi Subdistrict (园艺街道), Dongcheng Subdistrict (东城街道)

Towns:

- Guocun (郭村镇), Huanggang (黄岗镇), Zhongxing (终兴镇), Gaoweizhuang (高韦庄镇), Xuzhai (徐寨镇), Caitang (蔡堂镇), Zhuji (朱集镇), Lixinzhuang (李新庄镇), Fugang (浮岗镇), Laihe (莱河镇), Shilou (时楼镇), Yanglou (杨楼镇), Zhangji (张集镇), Longwangmiao (龙王庙镇), Litianlou (李田楼镇), Xieji (谢集镇)

Townships:

- Gaolaojia Township (高老家乡), Caozhuang Township (曹庄乡)

=== Yuncheng County ===
Subdistricts:

- Yunzhou Subdistrict (郓州街道), Tangta Subdistrict (唐塔街道)

Towns:

- Huang'an (黄安镇), Yangzhuangji (杨庄集镇), Houyanji (侯咽集镇), Wu'an (武安镇), Guotun (郭屯镇), Dinglichang (丁里长镇), Yuhuangmiao (玉皇庙镇), Chengtun (程屯镇), Suiguantun (随官屯镇), Zhangying (张营镇), Pandu (潘渡镇), Shuangqiao (双桥镇), Tangmiao (唐庙镇), Nanzhaolou (南赵楼镇), Huangduiji (黄堆集镇)

Townships:

- Huangji Township (黄集乡), Liji Township (李集乡), Zhangluji Township (张鲁集乡), Shuibao Township (水堡乡), Chenpo Township (陈坡乡)

== Jining ==
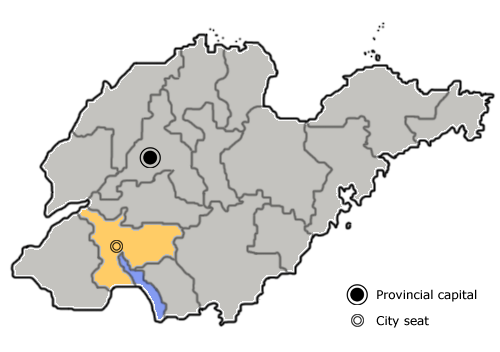
Location of Jining City in the province

=== Rencheng District ===
Subdistricts:

- Xuzhuang Subdistrict (许庄街道), Liuxing Subdistrict (柳行街道), Guanghe Subdistrict (洸河街道), Liying Subdistrict (李营街道), Nanzhang Subdistrict (南张街道), Jincheng Subdistrict (金城街道), Xianying Subdistrict (仙营街道)

Towns:

- Nianlipu (廿里铺镇), Changgou (长沟镇), Jiezhuang (接庄镇), Shiqiao (石桥镇)

Others:

- Yankuang Group Jidong New Village (兖矿集团济东新村)

=== Shizhong District, Jining ===
Subdistricts:

- Guhuai Subdistrict (古槐街道), Jiyang Subdistrict (济阳街道), Fuqiao Subdistrict (阜桥街道), Yuehe Subdistrict (越河街道), Nanfan Subdistrict (南苑街道), Guanyinge Subdistrict (观音阁街道), Anju Subdistrict (安居街道), Tangkou Subdistrict (唐口街道)

The only town is Yutun (喻屯镇)

=== Qufu ===
Subdistricts:

- Lucheng Subdistrict (鲁城街道), Shuyuan Subdistrict (书院街道)

Towns:

- Wucun (吴村镇), Yaocun (姚村镇), Lingcheng (陵城镇), Xiaoxue (小雪镇), Nanxin (南辛镇), Shizhuang (时庄镇)

Townships:

- Wangzhuang Township (王庄乡), Dongzhuang Township (董庄乡), Xizou Township (息陬乡), Fangshan Township (防山乡)

=== Yanzhou ===
Subdistricts:

- Gulou Subdistrict (鼓楼街道), Longqiao Subdistrict (龙桥街道), Jiuxianqiao Subdistrict (酒仙桥街道), Wangyin Subdistrict (王因街道), Huangtun Subdistrict (黄屯街道)

Towns:

- Da'an (大安镇), Xinyi (新驿镇), Yandian (颜店镇), Xinyan (新兖镇), Caohe (漕河镇), Xinglongzhuang (兴隆庄镇), Xiaomeng (小孟镇)

=== Zoucheng ===
Subdistricts:

- Gangshan Subdistrict (钢山街道), Qianquan Subdistrict (千泉街道), Fushan Subdistrict (凫山街道)

Towns:

- Xiangcheng (香城镇), Chengqian (城前镇), Dashu (大束镇), Beisu (北宿镇), Zhongxindian (中心店镇), Tangcun (唐村镇), Taiping (太平镇), Shiqiang (石墙镇), Yishan (峄山镇), Kanzhuang (看庄镇), Zhangzhuang (张庄镇), Tianhuang (田黄镇), Guoli (郭里镇)

=== Jiaxiang County ===
Towns:

- Jiaxiang (嘉祥镇), Zhifang (纸坊镇), Liangbaosi (梁宝寺镇), Wolongshan (卧龙山镇), Tuanli (疃里镇), Macun (马村镇), Jintun (金屯镇), Dazhanglou (大张楼镇)

Townships:

- Laosengtang Township (老僧堂乡), Huanggai Township (黄垓乡), Wanzhang Township (万张乡), Maji Township (马集乡), Mandong Township (满硐乡), Zhongshan Township (仲山乡), Mengguji Township (孟姑集乡)

=== Jinxiang County ===
Towns:

- Jinxiang (金乡镇), Yangshan (羊山镇), Huji (胡集镇), Xiaoyun (肖云镇), Jishu (鸡黍镇), Wangpi (王丕镇), Sima (司马镇), Yushan (鱼山镇), Mamiao (马庙镇)

Townships:

- Huayu Township (化雨乡), Buji Township (卜集乡), Gaohe Township (高河乡), Xinglong Township (兴隆乡)

=== Liangshan County ===
Towns:

- Liangshan (梁山镇), Xiaolukou (小路口镇), Hangang (韩岗镇), Quanpu (拳铺镇), Yangying (杨营镇), Hangai (韩垓镇), Guanyi (馆驿镇), Xiao'anshan (小安山镇), Maying (马营镇)

Townships:

- Shouzhangji Township (寿张集乡), Heihumiao Township (黑虎庙乡), Zhaogudui Township (赵堌堆乡), Dalukou Township (大路口乡)

=== Sishui County ===
Subdistricts:

- Sihe Subdistrict (泗河街道), Jihe Subdistrict (济河街道)

Towns:

- Quanlin (泉林镇), Xingcun (星村镇), Zhegou (柘沟镇), Jinzhuang (金庄镇), Miaoguan (苗馆镇), Zhongce (中册镇), Yangliu (杨柳镇), Sizhang (泗张镇)

Townships:

- Shengshuiyu Township (圣水峪乡), Dahuanggou Township (大黄沟乡), Gaoyu Township (高峪乡)

=== Weishan County ===
Subdistricts:

- Xiazhen Subdistrict (夏镇街道), Zhaoyang Subdistrict (昭阳街道)

Towns:

- Hanzhuang, Hebei (韩庄镇), Huancheng (欢城镇), Nanyang (南阳镇), Luqiao (鲁桥镇), Fucun (傅村镇), Liuzhuang (留庄镇)

Townships:

- Weishandao Township (微山岛乡), Liangcheng Township (两城乡), Mapo Township (马坡乡), Gaolou Township (高楼乡), Zhanglou Township (张楼乡), Zhaomiao Township (赵庙乡), Xiping Township (西平乡)

=== Wenshang County ===
Subdistricts:

- Wenshang Subdistrict (汶上街道), Zhongdu Subdistrict (中都街道)

Towns:

- Nanzhan (南站镇), Nanwang (南旺镇), Ciqiu (次丘镇), Yinsi (寅寺镇), Guolou (郭楼镇), Kangyi (康驿镇), Yuanzhuang (苑庄镇)

Townships:

- Yiqiao Township (义桥乡), Liulou Township (刘楼乡), Guocang Township (郭仓乡), Yangdian Township (杨店乡), Juntun Township (军屯乡), Baishi Township (白石乡)

=== Yutai County ===
Towns:

- Guting (谷亭镇), Qinghe (清河镇), Yucheng (鱼城镇), Wanglu (王鲁镇), Zhanghuang (张黄镇), Wangmiao (王庙镇), Lige (李阁镇)

Townships:

- Tangma Township (唐马乡), Laozhai Township (老砦乡), Luotun Township (罗屯乡)

== Laiwu ==
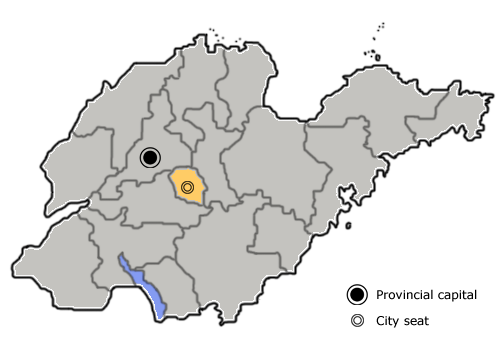
Location of Laiwu City in the province

=== Gangcheng District ===
The only subdistrict is Aishan Subdistrict (艾山街道)

Towns:

- Ezhuang (颜庄镇), Huangzhuang (黄庄镇), Lixin (里辛镇), Xinzhuang (辛庄镇)

=== Laicheng District ===
Subdistricts:

- Fengcheng Subdistrict (凤城街道), Zhangjiawa Subdistrict (张家洼街道), Gaozhuang Subdistrict (高庄街道), Pengquan Subdistrict (鹏泉街道)

Towns:

- Kou (口镇), Yangli (羊里镇), Fangxia (方下镇), Niuquan (牛泉镇), Miaoshan (苗山镇), Xueye (雪野镇), Dawangzhuang (大王庄镇), Zhaili (寨里镇), Yangzhuang (杨庄镇), Chayekou (茶业口镇)

The only township is Hezhuang Township (和庄乡)

== Liaocheng ==
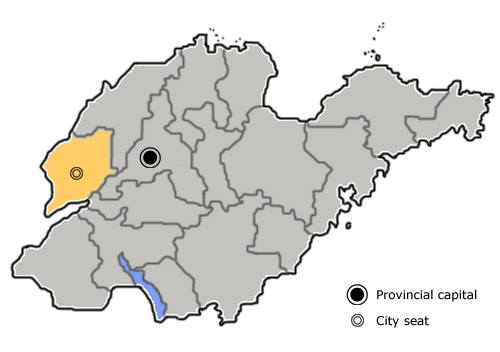
Location of Liaocheng City in the province

=== Dongchangfu District ===
Subdistricts:

- Gulou Subdistrict (古楼街道), Liuyuan Subdistrict (柳园街道), Xinqu Subdistrict (新区街道), Huxi Subdistrict (湖西街道), Daokoupu Subdistrict (道口铺街道), Yansi Subdistrict (阎寺街道), Fenghuang Subdistrict (凤凰街道), Beicheng Subdistrict (北城街道), Dongcheng Subdistrict (东城街道), Jiangguantun Subdistrict (蒋官屯街道)

Towns:

- Houying (侯营镇), Shazhen (沙镇镇), Tangyi (堂邑镇), Liangshui (梁水镇), Douhutun (斗虎屯镇), Zhengjia (郑家镇), Zhangluji (张炉集镇), Yuji (于集镇)

Townships:

- Xuying Township (许营乡), Zhulaozhuang Township (朱老庄乡)

=== Linqing ===
Subdistricts:

- Qingnian Road Subdistrict (青年路街道), Xinhua Road Subdistrict (新华路街道), Xianfeng Subdistrict (先锋路街道), Daxinzhuang Subdistrict (大辛庄街道)

Towns:

- Songlin (松林镇), Laozhaozhuang (老赵庄镇), Weiwan (魏湾镇), Liugaizi (刘垓子镇), Bachalu (八岔路镇), Panzhuang (潘庄镇), Yandian (烟店镇), Tangyuan (唐园镇)

Townships:

- Jinhaozhuang Township (金郝庄乡), Daiwan Township (戴湾乡), Shangdian Township (尚店乡)

=== Chiping County ===
Subdistricts:

- Zhenxing Subdistrict (振兴街道), Xinfa Subdistrict (信发街道)

Towns:

- Lepingpu (乐平铺镇), Fengguantun (冯官屯镇), Caitun (菜屯镇), Boping (博平镇), Dulang (杜郎口镇), Hantun (韩屯镇)

Townships:

- Hanji Township (韩集乡), Guangping Township (广平乡), Hutun Township (胡屯乡), Wenchen Township (温陈乡), Jiazhai Township (贾寨乡), Yangguantun Township (杨官屯乡), Hongguantun Township (洪官屯乡), Xiaozhuang Township (肖庄乡)

=== Dong'e County ===
Subdistricts:

- Tongcheng Subdistrict (铜城街道), Xincheng Subdistrict (新城街道)

Towns:

- Liuji (刘集镇), Niujiaodian (牛角店镇), Daqiao (大桥镇), Gaoji (高集镇), Jianglou (姜楼镇), Guguantun (顾官屯镇), Yaozhai (姚寨镇)

Townships:

- Yushan Township (鱼山乡), Chenji Township (陈集乡)

=== Gaotang County ===
Subdistricts:

- Yuqiuhu Subdistrict (鱼邱湖街道), Huili Subdistrict (汇鑫街道), Renhe Subdistrict (人和街道)

Towns:

- Liangcun (梁村镇), Yinji (尹集镇), Qingping (清平镇), Guhe (固河镇), Sanshilipu (三十里铺镇), Bolisi (琉璃寺镇)

Townships:

- Yangtun Township (杨屯乡), Zhaozhaizi Township (赵寨子乡), Jiangdian Township (姜店乡)

=== Guan County ===
Subdistricts:

- Qingquan Subdistrict (清泉街道), Chongwen Subdistrict (崇文街道), Yanzhuang Subdistrict (烟庄街道)

Towns:

- Jia (贾镇), Sang'e (桑阿镇), Liulin (柳林镇), Qingshui (清水镇), Donggucheng (东古城镇), Beiguantao (北馆陶镇), Dianzi (店子镇)

Townships:

- Xiedian Township (斜店乡), Liangtang Township (梁堂乡), Dingyuanzhai Township (定远寨乡), Xinji Township (辛集乡), Fanzhai Township (范寨乡), Ganguantun Township (甘官屯乡), Lanwo Township (兰沃乡), Wanshan Township (万善乡)

=== Shen County ===
Subdistricts:

- Yanta Subdistrict (燕塔街道), Shenting Subdistrict (莘亭街道), Shenzhou Subdistrict (莘州街道), Donglu Subdistrict (东鲁街道)

Towns:

- Zhanglu (张鲁镇), Chaocheng (朝城镇), Guancheng (观城镇), Gucheng (古城镇), Dazhangjia (大张家镇), Guyun (古云镇), Shibalipu (十八里铺镇), Yandian (燕店镇), Dongduzhuang (董杜庄镇), Wangfeng (王奉镇), Yingtaoyuan (樱桃园镇), Hedian (河店镇), Meizhong (妹冢镇), Weizhuang (魏庄镇), Zhangzhai (张寨镇), Dawangzhai (大王寨镇)

Townships:

- Zudian Township (俎店乡), Xuzhuang Township (徐庄乡), Wangzhuangji Township (王庄集乡), Shiziyuan Township (柿子园乡)

=== Yanggu County ===
Subdistricts:

- Bojiqiao Subdistrict (博济桥街道), Qiaorun Subdistrict (侨润街道), Shizilou Subdistrict (狮子楼街道)

Towns:

- Yanlou (阎楼镇), Echeng (阿城镇), Qiji (七级镇), Anle (安乐镇), Dingshui (定水镇), Shifo (石佛镇), Litai (李台镇), Shouzhang (寿张镇), Shiwuliyuan (十五里园镇), Zhangqiu (张秋镇)

Townships:

- Guodiantun Township (郭店屯乡), Dabu Township (大布乡), Xihu Township (西湖乡), Gaomiaowang Township (高庙王乡), Jindouying Township (金斗营乡)

== Linyi ==
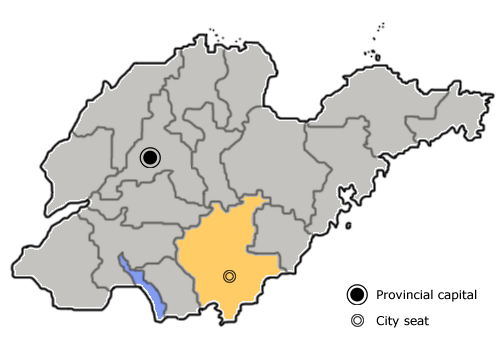
Location of Linyi City in the province

=== Hedong District ===
Subdistricts:

- Jiuqu Subdistrict (九曲街道), Zhimadun Subdistrict (芝麻墩街道), Meibu Subdistrict (梅埠街道), Xiangsong Subdistrict (相公街道), Taiping Subdistrict (太平街道), Tangtou Subdistrict (汤头街道), Fenghuangling Subdistrict (凤凰岭街道)

Towns:

- Chonggou (重沟镇), Tanghe (汤河镇), Bahu (八湖镇), Zhengwang (郑旺镇)

The only township is Liudianzi Township (刘店子乡)

=== Lanshan District, Linyi ===
Subdistricts:

- Lanshan Subdistrict (兰山街道), Yinqueshan Subdistrict (银雀山街道), Jinqueshan Subdistrict (金雀山街道), Nanfang Subdistrict (南坊街道)

Towns:

- Baishabu (白沙埠镇), Zaogoutou (枣沟头镇), Niucheng (半程镇), Yitang (义堂镇), Machanghu (马厂湖镇), Liguan (李官镇), Zhubao (朱保镇), Xinqiao (新桥镇), Fangcheng (方城镇), Wanggou (汪沟镇)

=== Luozhuang District ===
Subdistricts:

- Luozhuang Subdistrict (罗庄街道), Fuzhuang Subdistrict (付庄街道), Shengzhuang Subdistrict (盛庄街道), Tangzhuang Subdistrict (汤庄街道), Shuangyuehu Subdistrict (双月湖街道), Ceshan Subdistrict (册山街道), Gaodu Subdistrict (高都街道), Luoxi Subdistrict (罗西街道)

=== Cangshan County ===
Towns:

- Bianzhuang (卞庄镇), Dazhongcun (大仲村镇), Lanling (兰陵镇), Changcheng (长城镇), Moshan (磨山镇), Shenshan (神山镇), Chewang (车辋镇), Shangyan (尚岩镇), Xiangcheng (向城镇), Xinxing (新兴镇), Nanqiao (南桥镇), Cengshan (层山镇), Zhuangwu (庄坞镇), Yitang (沂堂镇)

Townships:

- Jiazhuang Township (贾庄乡), Kuangkeng Township (矿坑乡), Xiacun Township (下村乡), Lucheng Township (鲁城乡), Sanhe Township (三合乡), Xingming Township (兴明乡), Ermiao Township (二庙乡)

=== Fei County ===
The only subdistrict is Feicheng Subdistrict (费城街道)

Towns:

- Shangye (上冶镇), Xuezhuang (薛庄镇), Tanyi (探沂镇), Zhutian (朱田镇), Liangqiu (梁邱镇), Xinzhuang (新庄镇), Mazhuang (马庄镇), Huyang (胡阳镇), Shijing (石井镇)

Townships:

- Datianzhuang Township (大田庄乡), Nanzhangzhuang Township (南张庄乡)

=== Junan County ===
Towns:

- Shizilu (十字路镇), Tuanlin (团林镇), Dadian (大店镇), Fangqian (坊前镇), Pingshang (坪上镇), Xiangdi (相邸镇), Banquan (板泉镇), Zhubian (洙边镇), Wentuan (文疃镇), Zhuanggang (壮岗镇), Tingshui (汀水镇), Shilianzi (石莲子镇), Lingquan (岭泉镇), Yanbin (筵宾镇), Laopo (涝坡镇), Zhulu (朱芦镇)

Townships:

- Daokou Township (道口乡), Xianggou Township (相沟乡)

=== Linshu County ===
Towns:

- Linshu (临沭镇), Jiaolong (蛟龙镇), Daxing (大兴镇), Shimen (石门镇), Caozhuang (曹庄镇), Nangu (南古镇), Zhengshan (郑山镇), Baimao (白旄镇), Qingyun (青云镇), Yushan (玉山镇), Diantou (店头镇)

The only township is Zhucang Township (朱仓乡)

=== Mengyin County ===
The only subdistrict is Mengyin Subdistrict (蒙阴街道)

Towns:

- Changlu (常路镇), Daigu (岱崮镇), Tanbu (坦埠镇), Duozhuang (垛庄镇), Gaodu (高都镇), Yedian (野店镇), Taoxu (桃墟镇), Jiepai (界牌镇)

Townships:

- Liancheng Township (联城乡), Jiuzhai Township (旧寨乡)

=== Pingyi County ===
Towns:

- Pingyi (平邑镇), Zhongcun (仲村镇), Wutai (武台镇), Baotai (保太镇), Bailin (柏林镇), Bianqiao (卞桥镇), Difang (地方镇), Tongshi (铜石镇), Wenshui (温水镇), Liuyu (流峪镇), Zhengcheng (郑城镇), Baiyan (白彦镇), Linjian (临涧镇), Fengyang (丰阳镇)

Townships:

- Ziqiu Township (资邱乡), Weizhuang Township (魏庄乡)

=== Tancheng County ===
Towns:

- Tancheng (郯城镇), Matou (马头镇), Chongfang (重坊镇), Lizhuang (李庄镇), Chudun (褚墩镇), Yangji (杨集镇), Huangshan (黄山镇), Gangshang (港上镇), Gaofengtou (高峰头镇), Miaoshan (庙山镇), Shadun (沙墩镇)

Townships:

- Shengli Township (胜利乡), Xincun Township (新村乡), Huayuan Township (花园乡), Guichang Township (归昌乡), Honghua Township (红花乡), Quanyuan Township (泉源乡)

=== Yinan County ===
Towns:

- Jiehu (界湖镇), Andi (岸堤镇), Sunzu (孙祖镇), Shuanghou (双堠镇), Qingtuo (青驼镇), Zhangzhuang (张庄镇), Zhuanbu (砖埠镇), Gegou (葛沟镇), Yangjiapo (杨家坡镇), Dazhuang (大庄镇), Xinji (辛集镇), Puwang (蒲汪镇), Hutou (湖头镇), Sucun (苏村镇), Tongjing (铜井镇), Yiwen (依汶镇)

The only township is Mamuchi Township (马牧池乡)

=== Yishui County ===
Towns:

- Yishui (沂水镇), Mazhan (马站镇), Gaoqiao (高桥镇), Xujiahu (许家湖镇), Huangshanpu (黄山铺镇), Yaodianzi (姚店子镇), Zhuge (诸葛镇), Cuijiayu (崔家峪镇), Sishilibao (四十里堡镇), Yangzhuang (杨庄镇), Xiawei (夏蔚镇), Shagou (沙沟镇), Gaozhuang (高庄镇)

Townships:

- Daotuo Township (道托乡), Quanli Township (圈里乡), Longjiaquan Township (龙家圈乡), Quanzhuang Township (泉庄乡), Fuguanzhuang Township (富官庄乡), Yuandongtou Township (院东头乡)

== Rizhao ==
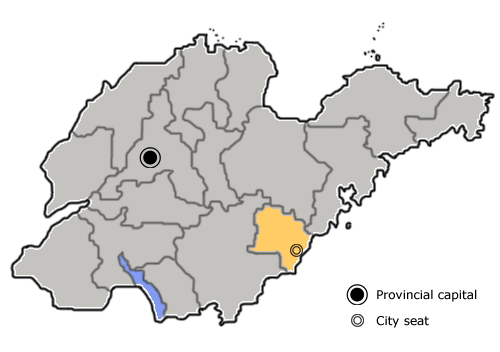
Location of Rizhao City in the province

=== Donggang District ===
Subdistricts:

- Rizhao Subdistrict (日照街道), Shijiu Subdistrict (石臼街道), Kuishan Subdistrict (奎山街道), Qinlou Subdistrict (秦楼街道), Beijing Road Subdistrict (北京路街道)

Towns:

- Heshan (河山镇), Liangcheng (两城镇), Taoluo (涛雒镇), Xihu (西湖镇), Chentuan (陈疃镇), Nanhu (南湖镇), Sanzhuang (三庄镇)

=== Lanshan District, Rizhao ===
Subdistricts:

- Lanshantou Subdistrict (岚山头街道), Andongwei Subdistrict (安东卫街道)

Towns:

- Beikuo (碑廓镇), Hushan (虎山镇), Jufeng (巨峰镇), Gaoxing (高兴镇), Houcun (后村镇), Huangdun (黄墩镇)

The only township is Qiansandao Township (前三岛乡)

=== Ju County ===
Towns:

- Chengyang (城阳镇), Zhaoxian (招贤镇), Yanzhuang (阎庄镇), Xiazhuang (夏庄镇), Liuguanzhuang (刘官庄镇), Qiaoshan (峤山镇), Xiaodian (小店镇), Zhonglou (中楼镇), Longshan (龙山镇), Dongguan (东莞镇), Fulaishan (浮来山镇), Lingyang (陵阳镇), Dianziji (店子集镇), Changling (长岭镇), Anzhuang (安庄镇), Qishan (棋山镇), Luohe (洛河镇), Sangyuan (桑园镇)

Townships:

- Zhailihe Township (寨里河乡), Guozhuang Township (果庄乡), Kushan Township (库山乡)

=== Wulian County ===
Towns:

- Hongning (洪凝镇), Jietou (街头镇), Chaohe (潮河镇), Xumeng (许孟镇), Yuli (于里镇), Wanghu (汪湖镇), Kouguan (叩官镇), Zhongzhi (中至镇), Gaoze (高泽镇)

Townships:

- Shichang Township (石场乡), Hubu Township (户部乡), Songbai Township (松柏乡)

== Tai'an ==
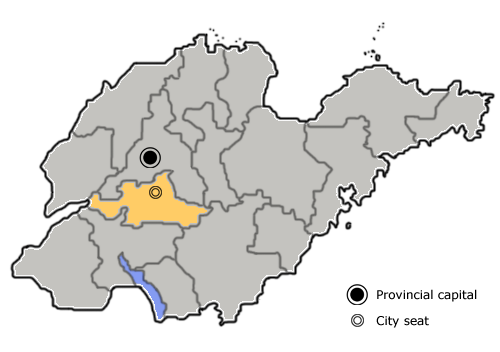
Location of Tai'an City in the province

=== Daiyue District ===
Subdistricts:

- Zhoudian Subdistrict (粥店街道), Tianping Subdistrict (天平街道)

Towns:

- Shankou (山口镇), Zhuyang (祝阳镇), Fan (范镇), Jiaoyu (角峪镇), Culai (徂徕镇), Beijipo (北集坡镇), Manzhuang (满庄镇), Xiazhang (夏张镇), Daolang (道朗镇), Huangqian (黄前镇), Dawenkou (大汶口镇), Mazhuang (马庄镇), Fangcun (房村镇), Liangzhuang (良庄镇)

Townships:

- Xiagang Township (下港乡), Huamawan Township (化马湾乡)

=== Taishan District ===
Subdistricts:

- Daimiao Subdistrict (岱庙街道), Caiyuan Subdistrict (财源街道), Taiqian Subdistrict (泰前街道), Shanggao Subdistrict (上高街道), Xujialou Subdistrict (徐家楼街道)

Towns:

- Shengzhuang (省庄镇), Qiujiadian (邱家店镇)

The only township is Dajinkou Township (大津口乡)

=== Feicheng ===
Subdistricts:

- Xincheng Subdistrict (新城街道), Laocheng Subdistrict (老城街道), Wangguadian Subdistrict (王瓜店街道)

Towns:

- Chaoquan (潮泉镇), Hutun (湖屯镇), Shiheng (石横镇), Taoyuan (桃园镇), Wangzhuang (王庄镇), Yiyang (仪阳镇), Anzhan (安站镇), Sunbo (孙伯镇), Anzhuang (安庄镇), Bianyuan (边院镇), Wenyang (汶阳镇)

=== Xintai ===
Subdistricts:

- Qingyun Subdistrict (青云街道), Xinwen Subdistrict (新汶街道)

Towns:

- Dongdu (东都镇), Xiaoxie (小协镇), Zhai (翟镇), Quangou (泉沟镇), Yangliu (羊流镇), Guodu (果都镇), Xizhangzhuang (西张庄镇), Tianbao (天宝镇), Loude (楼德镇), Yucun (禹村镇), Gongli (宫里镇), Guli (谷里镇), Shilai (石莱镇), Fangcheng (放城镇), Liudu (刘杜镇), Wennan (汶南镇), Longyan (龙廷镇)

The only township is Daijiazhuang Township (岳家庄乡)

=== Dongping County ===
Towns:

- Zhoucheng (州城镇), Shahezhan (沙河站镇), Pengji (彭集镇), Dongping (东平镇), Laohu (老湖镇), Yinshan (银山镇), Banjiudian (斑鸠店镇)

Townships:

- Jieshan Township (接山乡), Dayang Township (大羊乡), Timen Township (梯门乡), Xinhu Township (新湖乡), Shanglaozhuang Township (商老庄乡), Daimiao Township (戴庙乡), Jiuxian Township (旧县乡)

=== Ningyang County ===
Towns:

- Ningyang (宁阳镇), Sidian (泗店镇), Dongshu (东疏镇), Fushan (伏山镇), Gangcheng (堽城镇), Jiangji (蒋集镇), Ciyao (磁窑镇), Huafeng (华丰镇), Geshi (葛石镇)

Townships:

- Heshan Township (鹤山乡), Dongzhuang Township (东庄乡), Xiangyin Township (乡饮乡)

== Weifang ==
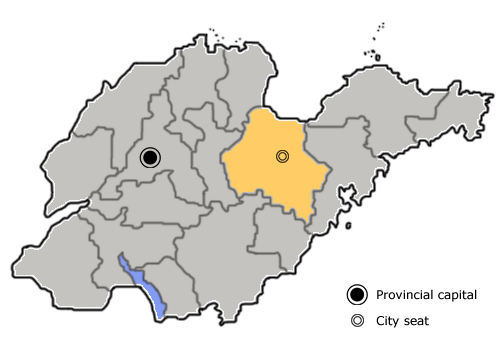
Location of Weifang City in the province

=== Fangzi District ===
Subdistricts:

- Fenghuang Subdistrict (凤凰街道), Fang'an Subdistrict (坊安街道), Fangcheng Subdistrict (坊城街道), Jiulong Subdistrict (九龙街道)

Towns:

- Huangqibao (黄旗堡镇), Taibaozhuang (太保庄镇)

=== Hanting District ===
Subdistricts:

- Hanting Subdistrict (寒亭街道), Kaiyuan Subdistrict (开元街道), Gudi Subdistrict (固堤街道), Yangzi Subdistrict (央子街道), Gaoli Subdistrict (高里街道), Zhuli Subdistrict (朱里街道), Dajiawa Subdistrict (大家洼街道)

=== Kuiwen District ===
Subdistricts:

- Dongguan Subdistrict (东关街道), Dayu Subdistrict (大虞街道), Liyuan Subdistrict (梨园街道), Nianlibao Subdistrict (廿里堡街道), Weizhou Road Subdistrict (潍州路街道), Beifan Subdistrict (北苑街道), Guangwen Subdistrict (广文街道), Xincheng Subdistrict (新城街道), Qingchi Subdistrict (清池街道)

=== Weicheng District ===
Subdistricts:

- Chengguan Subdistrict (城关街道), Nanguan Subdistrict (南关街道), Xiguan Subdistrict (西关街道), Beiguan Subdistrict (北关街道), Yuhe Subdistrict (于河街道), Wangliu Subdistrict (望留街道)

=== Anqiu ===
Subdistricts:

- Xing'an Subdistrict (兴安街道), Xin'an Subdistrict (新安街道)

Towns:

- Jingzhi (景芝镇), Linghe (凌河镇), Guanzhuang (官庄镇), Dasheng (大盛镇), Zhaoge (赵戈镇), Shibuzi (石埠子镇), Shidui (石堆镇), Zheshan (柘山镇), Huiliang (辉渠镇), Wushan (吾山镇), Jinzhongzi (金冢子镇)

=== Changyi ===
Subdistricts:

- Kuiju Subdistrict (奎聚街道), Duchang Subdistrict (都昌街道)

Towns:

- Liutuan (柳疃镇), Longchi (龙池镇), Buzhuang (卜庄镇), Weizi (围子镇), Yinma (饮马镇), Beimeng (北孟镇)

=== Gaomi ===
Subdistricts:

- Chaoyang Subdistrict (朝阳街道), Liquan Subdistrict (醴泉街道), Mishui Subdistrict (密水街道)

Towns:

- Baicheng (柏城镇), Xiazhuang (夏庄镇), Jiangzhuang (姜庄镇), Damoujia (大牟家镇), Kanjia (阚家镇), Jinggou (井沟镇), Chaigou (柴沟镇)

=== Qingzhou ===
Subdistricts:

- Wangfu Subdistrict (王府街道), Yidu Subdistrict (益都街道), Yunmenshan Subdistrict (云门山街道)

Towns:

- Mihe (弥河镇), Wangfen (王坟镇), Miaozi (庙子镇), Shaozhuang (邵庄镇), Gaoliu (高柳镇), Heguan (何官镇), Dongxia (东夏镇), Tanfang (谭坊镇), Huanglou (黄楼镇)

=== Shouguang ===
Subdistricts:

- Shengcheng Subdistrict (圣城街道), Wenjia Subdistrict (文家街道), Gucheng Subdistrict (古城街道), Luocheng Subdistrict (洛城街道), Sunjiaji Subdistrict (孙家集街道)

Towns:

- Hualong (化龙镇), Yingli (营里镇), Taitou (台头镇), Tianliu (田柳镇), Shangkou (上口镇), Houzhen (侯镇镇), Jitai (纪台镇), Daotian (稻田镇), Yangkou (羊口镇)

=== Zhucheng ===
Subdistricts:

- Mizhou Subdistrict (密州街道), Longdu Subdistrict (龙都街道), Shunwang Subdistrict (舜王街道)

Towns:

- Zhigou (枳沟镇), Jianyue (贾悦镇), Shiqiaozi (石桥子镇), Xiangzhou (相州镇), Changcheng (昌城镇), Baichihe (百尺河镇), Xinxing (辛兴镇), Linjiacun (林家村镇), Huanghua (皇华镇)

The only township is Taolin Township (桃林乡)

=== Changle County ===
Subdistricts:

- Chengguan Subdistrict (城关街道), Baocheng Subdistrict (宝城街道), Zhuliu Subdistrict (朱刘街道), Chengnan Subdistrict (城南街道), Wutu Subdistrict (五图街道)

Towns:

- Qiaoguan (乔官镇), Tangwu (唐吾镇), Honghe (红河镇), Yingqiu (营丘镇)

=== Linqu County ===
Subdistricts:

- Chengguan Subdistrict (城关街道), Dongcheng Subdistrict (东城街道)

Towns:

- Wujing (五井镇), Yeyuan (冶源镇), Sitou (寺头镇), Jiushan (九山镇), Xinzhai (辛寨镇), Longgang (龙岗镇), Liushan (柳山镇), Yishan (沂山镇)

== Weihai ==
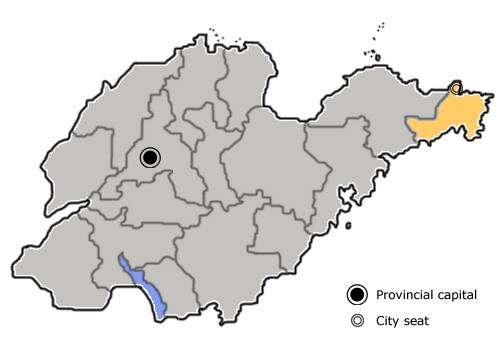
Location of Weihai City in the province

=== Huancui District ===
Subdistricts:

- Huancuilou Subdistrict (环翠楼街道), Jingyuan Subdistrict (鲸园街道), Zhudao Subdistrict (竹岛街道), Qiayuan Subdistrict (怡园街道), Tianhe Subdistrict (田和街道), Huangguan Subdistrict (皇冠街道), Fenglin Subdistrict (凤林街道), Xifan Subdistrict (西苑街道)

Towns:

- Zhangcun (张村镇), Yangting (羊亭镇), Wenquan (温泉镇), Gushan (崮山镇), Sunjiatuan (孙家疃镇), Poyu (泊于镇), Qiaotou (桥头镇), Caomiaozi (草庙子镇), Chucun (初村镇)

=== Rongcheng ===
Subdistricts:

- Ningjin Subdistrict (宁津街道), Gangwan Subdistrict (港湾街道), Taoyuan Subdistrict (桃园街道), Wanglian Subdistrict (王连街道), Dongshan Subdistrict (东山街道), Chishan Subdistrict (斥山街道), Yatou Subdistrict (崖头街道), Chengxi Subdistrict (城西街道), Xunshan Subdistrict (寻山街道), Laoshan Subdistrict (崂山街道)

Towns:

- Lidao (俚岛镇), Chengshan (成山镇), Buliu (埠柳镇), Gangxi (港西镇), Xiazhuang (夏庄镇), Yaxi (崖西镇), Yinzi (荫子镇), Tengjia (滕家镇), Datuan (大疃镇), Shangzhuang (上庄镇), Hushan (虎山镇), Renhe (人和镇)

=== Rushan ===
The only subdistrict is Chengqu Subdistrict (城区街道)

Towns:

- Xiacun (夏村镇), Rushankou (乳山口镇), Haiyangsuo (海阳所镇), Baishatan (白沙滩镇), Dagushan (大孤山镇), Nanhuang (南黄镇), Fengjia (冯家镇), Xiachu (下初镇), Wuji (午极镇), Yuli (育黎镇), Yazi (崖子镇), Zhuwang (诸往镇), Rushanzhai (乳山寨镇), Xujia (徐家镇)

=== Wendeng ===
Subdistricts:

- Longshan Road Subdistrict (龙山路街道), Tianfu Road Subdistrict (天福路街道), Huanshan Road Subdistrict (环山路街道)

Towns:

- Wendengying (文登营镇), Dashuipo (大水泊镇), Zhangjiachan (张家产镇), Gaocun (高村镇), Zeku (泽库镇), Houjia (侯家镇), Songcun (宋村镇), Zetou (泽头镇), Xiaoguan (小观镇), Gejia (葛家镇), Mishan (米山镇), Jieshi (界石镇), Wangtuan (汪疃镇), Manshan (蔄山镇)

Others: Wendeng Development Zone (文登市开发区)

== Yantai ==
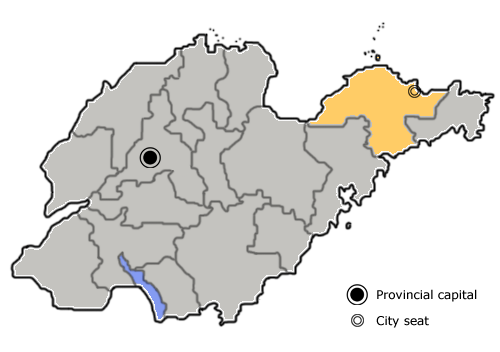
Location of Yantai City in the province

=== Fushan District ===
Subdistricts:

- Qingyang Subdistrict (清洋街道), Fuxin Subdistrict (福新街道), Guxian Subdistrict (古现街道), Dajijia Subdistrict (大季家街道), Bajiao Subdistrict (八角街道), Fulaishan Subdistrict (福莱山街道) Menlou Subdistrict (门楼街道)

Towns:

- Gaotuan (高疃镇), Zhanggezhuang (张格庄镇), Huili (回里镇)

=== Laishan District ===
Subdistricts:

- Huanghai Road Subdistrict (黄海路街道), Chujia Subdistrict (初家街道), Binhai Road Subdistrict (滨海路街道), Laishan Subdistrict (莱山街道), Jiejiazhuang Subdistrict (解甲庄街道), Mashan Subdistrict (马山街道), Yuangezhuang Subdistrict (院格庄街道)

=== Muping District ===
Subdistricts:

- Ninghai Subdistrict (宁海街道), Wenhua Subdistrict (文化街道), Yangma Island Subdistrict (养马岛街道)

Towns:

- Guanshui (观水镇), Wuning (武宁镇), Dayao (大窑镇), Jianggezhuang (姜格庄镇), Longquan (龙泉镇), Yulindian (玉林店镇), Shuidao (水道镇), Jugezhuang (莒格庄镇), Gaoling (高陵镇), Wanggezhuang (王格庄镇)

=== Zhifu District ===
Subdistricts:

- Xiangyang Subdistrict (向阳街道), Dongshan Subdistrict (东山街道), Yuhuang Subdistrict (毓璜顶街道), Tongshen Subdistrict (通伸街道), Fenghuangtai Subdistrict (凤凰台街道), Qishan Subdistrict (奇山街道), Baishi Subdistrict (白石街道), Zhifu Island Subdistrict (芝罘岛街道), Huangwu Subdistrict (黄务街道), Zhichu Subdistrict (只楚街道), Shihuiyao Subdistrict (世回尧街道), Xingfu Subdistrict (幸福街道)

=== Haiyang ===
Subdistricts:

- Fangyuan Subdistrict (方圆街道), Dongcun Subdistrict (东村街道), Fengcheng Subdistrict (凤城街道)

Towns:

- Liugezhuang (留格庄镇), Panshidian (盘石店镇), Guocheng (郭城镇), Xujiadian (徐家店镇), Facheng (发城镇), Xiaoji (小纪镇), Xingcun (行村镇), Xin'an (辛安镇), Shierlidian (二十里店镇), Dayanjia (大阎家镇), Zhuwu (朱吴镇)

Others:

- Haiyang Export-Oriented Processing Industries District (海阳外向型工业加工区)

=== Laiyang ===
Subdistricts:

- Chengxiang Subdistrict (城厢街道), Guliu Subdistrict (古柳街道), Longwangzhuang Subdistrict (龙旺庄街道), Fenggezhuang Subdistrict (冯格庄街道)

Towns:

- Muyudian (沐浴店镇), Tuanwang (团旺镇), Xuefang (穴坊镇), Yangjun (羊郡镇), Jiangtuan (姜疃镇), Wandi (万第镇), Zhaowangzhuang (照旺庄镇), Tangezhuang (谭格庄镇), Bolinzhuang (柏林庄镇), Heluo (河洛镇), Lügezhuang (吕格庄镇), Gaogezhuang (高格庄镇), Dakuang (大夼镇), Shanqiandian (山前店镇)

=== Laizhou ===
Subdistricts:

- Wenchang Road Subdistrict (文昌路街道), Yong'an Road Subdistrict (永安路街道), Sanshan Island Subdistrict (三山岛街道), Chenggang Road Subdistrict (城港路街道), Wenfeng Road Subdistrict (文峰路街道)

Towns:

- Shahe (沙河镇), Zhuqiao (朱桥镇), Guojiadian (郭家店镇), Jincheng (金城镇), Pinglidian (平里店镇), Yidao (驿道镇), Chengguo (程郭镇), Hutouya (虎头崖镇), Zhacun (柞村镇), Xiaqiu (夏邱镇), Tushan (土山镇)

=== Longkou ===
Subdistricts:

- Donglai Subdistrict (东莱街道), Longgang Subdistrict (龙港街道), Xinjia Subdistrict (新嘉街道), Xufu Subdistrict (徐福街道), Dongjiang Subdistrict (东江街道)

Towns:

- Huangshanguan (黄山馆镇), Beima (北马镇), Lutou (芦头镇), Xiadingjia (下丁家镇), Qijia (七甲镇), Shiliang (石良镇), Langao (兰高镇), Zhuyouguan (诸由观镇)

=== Penglai ===
Subdistricts:

- Dengzhou Subdistrict (登州街道), Zijingshan Subdistrict (紫荆山街道), Xingang Subdistrict (新港街道), Penglaige Subdistrict (蓬莱阁街道), Nanwang Subdistrict (南王街道)

Towns:

- Liujiagou (刘家沟镇), Chaoshui (潮水镇), Daliuhang (大柳行镇), Xiaomenjia (小门家镇), Daxindian (大辛店镇), Cunliji (村里集镇), Beigou (北沟镇)

=== Qixia ===
Subdistricts:

- Cuizhan Subdistrict (翠屏街道), Zhuangyuan Subdistrict (庄园街道), Songshan Subdistrict (松山街道)

Towns:

- Guanli (观里镇), Shewobo (蛇窝泊镇), Tangjiabo (唐家泊镇), Taocun (桃村镇), Tingkou (亭口镇), Zangjiazhuang (臧家庄镇), Sikou (寺口镇), Sujiadian (苏家店镇), Yangchu (杨础镇), Xicheng (西城镇), Guandao (官道镇), Miaohou (庙后镇)

=== Zhaoyuan ===
Subdistricts:

- Luofeng Subdistrict (罗峰街道), Quanshan Subdistrict (泉山街道), Mengzhi Subdistrict (梦芝街道), Wenquan Subdistrict (温泉街道)

Towns:

- Xinzhuang (辛庄镇), Canzhuang (蚕庄镇), Jinling (金岭镇), Biguo (毕郭镇), Linglong (玲珑镇), Zhangxing (张星镇), Daqinjia (大秦家镇), Xiadian (夏甸镇), Bushan (阜山镇), Qishan (齐山镇)

=== Changdao County ===
Towns:

- Nanchangshan (南长山镇), Tuoji (砣矶镇)

Townships:

- Beichangshan Township (北长山乡), Heishan Township (黑山乡), Daqindao Township (大钦岛乡), Xiaoqindao Township (小钦岛乡), Nanhuangcheng Township (南隍城乡), Beihuangcheng Township (北隍城乡)

== Zaozhuang ==
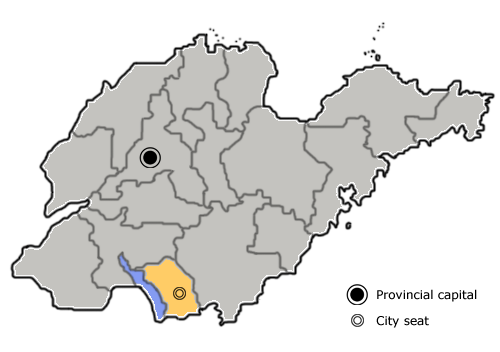
Location of Zaozhuang City in the province

=== Shanting District ===
The only subdistrict is Shancheng Subdistrict (山城街道)

Towns:

- Dianzi (店子镇), Xiji (西集镇), Sangcun (桑村镇), Beizhuang (北庄镇), Chengtou (城头镇), Xuzhuang (徐庄镇), Shuiquan (水泉镇), Fengmao (冯卯镇)

The only township is Fucheng Township (凫城乡)

=== Shizhong District, Zaozhuang ===
Subdistricts:

- Zhongxin Avenue Subdistrict (中心街街道), Getabu Subdistrict (各塔埠街道), Kuangqu Subdistrict (矿区街道), Wenhua Road Subdistrict (文化路街道), Longshan Road Subdistrict (龙山路街道), Guangming Road Subdistrict (光明路街道)

Towns:

- Shuiguo (税郭镇), Mengzhuang (孟庄镇), Qicun (齐村镇)

Townships:

- Yong'an Township (永安乡), Xiwangzhuang Township (西王庄乡)

=== Tai'erzhuang District ===
The only subdistrict is Yunhe Subdistrict (运河街道)

Towns:

- Pizhuang (邳庄镇), Zhangshanzi (张山子镇), Nigou (泥沟镇), Jiantouji (涧头集镇), Malantun (马兰屯镇)

=== Xuecheng District ===
Subdistricts:

- Lincheng Subdistrict (临城街道), Xingren Subdistrict (兴仁街道), Xingcheng Subdistrict (兴城街道)

Towns:

- Shagou (沙沟镇), Zhouying (周营镇), Zouwu (邹坞镇), Taozhuang (陶庄镇), Changzhuang (常庄镇), Zhangfan (张范镇)

=== Yicheng District ===
Subdistricts:

- Tanshan Subdistrict (坛山街道), Wulin Subdistrict (吴林街道)

Towns:

- Gushao (古邵镇), Yinping (阴平镇), Dige (底阁镇), Liuyuan (榴园镇), Eshan (峨山镇)

=== Tengzhou ===
Subdistricts:

- Jinghe Subdistrict (荆河街道), Longquan Subdistrict (龙泉街道), Beixin Subdistrict (北辛街道), Shannan Subdistrict (善南街道)

Towns

- Dongshahe (东沙河镇), Hongxu (洪绪镇), Nanshahe (南沙河镇), Dawu (大坞镇), Binhu (滨湖镇), Jisuo (级索镇), Xigang (西岗镇), Jiangtun (姜屯镇), Baogou (鲍沟镇), Zhangwang (张汪镇), Guanqiao (官桥镇), Chaihudian (柴胡店镇), Yangzhuang (羊庄镇), Mushi (木石镇), Jiehe (界河镇), Longyang (龙阳镇), Dongguo (东郭镇)

== Zibo ==
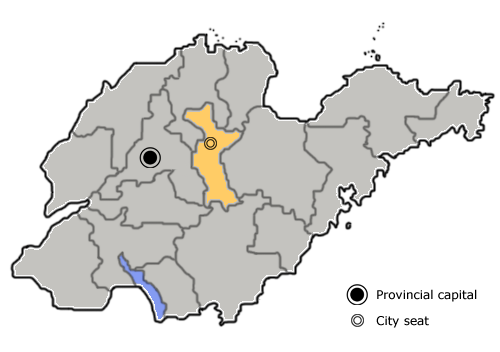
Location of Zibo City in the province

=== Boshan District ===
Subdistricts:

- Chengdong Subdistrict (城东街道), Chengxi Subdistrict (城西街道)

Towns:

- Yucheng (域城镇), Baita (白塔镇), Xiajiazhuang (夏家庄镇), Shantou (山头镇), Badou (八陡镇), Gushan (崮山镇), Shima (石马镇), Beiboshan (北博山镇), Nanboshan (南博山镇), Yuanquan (源泉镇), Chishang (池上镇)

=== Linzi District ===
Subdistricts:

- Wenshao Subdistrict (闻韶街道), Xuegong Subdistrict (雪宫街道), Xindian Subdistrict (辛店街道), Jixia Subdistrict (稷下街道), Qiling Subdistrict (齐陵街道)

Towns:

- Qidu (齐都镇), Huangcheng (皇城镇), Jingzhong (敬仲镇), Zhutai (朱台镇), Wutai (梧台镇), Jinling (金岭镇), Nanwang (南王镇), Fenghuang (凤凰镇)

The only township is Bianhe Township (边河乡)

=== Zhangdian District ===
Subdistricts:

- Chezhan Subdistrict (车站街道), Gongyuan Subdistrict (公园街道), Xingyuan Subdistrict (杏园街道), Heping Subdistrict (和平街道), Kefan Subdistrict (科苑街道), Tiyuchang Subdistrict (体育场街道), Shiqiao Subdistrict (石桥街道), Sibaoshan Subdistrict (四宝山街道)

Towns:

- Mashang (马尚镇), Nanding (南定镇), Fengshui (沣水镇), Hutian (湖田镇), Fujia (傅家镇), Zhongbu (中埠镇), Weigu (卫固镇), Fangzhen (房镇镇)

=== Zhoucun District ===
Subdistricts:

- Sichou Road Subdistrict (丝绸路街道), Dajie Subdistrict (大街街道), Qingnian Road Subdistrict (青年路街道), Yong'an Subdistrict (永安街道), Chengbei Road Subdistrict (城北路街道)

Towns:

- Beijiao (北郊镇), Nanjiao (南郊镇), Wangcun (王村镇), Mengshui (萌水镇)

=== Zichuan District ===
Subdistricts:

- Banyang Road Subdistrict (般阳路街道), Songling Road Subdistrict (松龄路街道), Shangcheng Road Subdistrict (商城路街道), Zhonglou Subdistrict (钟楼街道)

Towns:

- Chengnan (城南镇), Kunlun (昆仑镇), Cicun (磁村镇), Lingzi (岭子镇), Shangjia (商家镇), Heiwang (黑旺镇), Zihe (淄河镇), Dongping (东坪镇), Xihe (西河镇), Longquan (龙泉镇), Zhaili (寨里镇), Luocun (罗村镇), Hongshan (洪山镇), Shuangyang (双杨镇), Taihe (太河镇)

Townships:

- Ezhuang Township (峨庄乡), Zhangzhuang Township (张庄乡)

=== Gaoqing County ===
Towns:

- Tian (田镇), Qingcheng (青城镇), Gaocheng (高城镇), Heilizhai (黑里寨镇), Tangfang (唐坊镇), Changjia (常家镇), Huagou (花沟镇), Zhaodian (赵店镇), Muli (木李镇)

=== Huantai County ===
Towns:

- Suozhen (索镇镇), Qifeng (起凤镇), Xingjia (邢家镇), Tianzhuang (田庄镇), Jingjia (荆家镇), Maqiao (马桥镇), Chenzhuang (陈庄镇), Xincheng (新城镇), Zhoujia (周家镇), Tangshan (唐山镇), Guoli (果里镇)

=== Yiyuan County ===
The only subdistrict is Lishan Subdistrict (历山街道)

Towns:

- Nanma (南麻镇), Lucun (鲁村镇), Dongli (东里镇), Yuezhuang (悦庄镇), Xili (西里镇), Dazhangzhuang (大张庄镇), Zhongzhuang (中庄镇), Zhangjiapo (张家坡镇), Yanya (燕崖镇), Shiqiao (石桥镇), Nanlushan (南鲁山镇)
