= Dongchang Prefecture =

Former administrative division in Shandong, China

Dongchang Prefecture within Shandong province in 1820

Dongchang Prefecture (東昌府) was a fu (prefecture) during the Ming and Qing dynasties in Shandong province, it centers in today's Liaocheng, and is the namesake of Dongchangfu, Liaocheng.

During the Yuan dynasty, it was known as Dongchang Lu. In the early Hongwu reign of the Ming dynasty, it was reorganized as Dongchang Prefecture. Its administrative seat was located in Liaocheng County, and it administered three subprefectures and 15 counties:

- Subprefectures: Linqing, Gaotang, Puzhou
- Counties: Liaocheng, Tangy (堂邑), Boping, Chiping, Shen, Qingping (清平), Guan, Qiu, Guantao, En (恩縣), Xiajin, Wucheng, Fan, Guancheng (觀城), and Chaocheng.

In the Qing dynasty, its administrative evaluation was: “strategic and populous” (衝, 繁). It belonged to the Jidong–Taiwu–Lindao Circuit (濟東泰武臨道). Initially, following the Ming system, it governed three subprefectures and five counties.

After the abdication of the Xuantong Emperor, the Republic of China was established, and the nationwide policy of abolishing prefectures and subprefectures was implemented, resulting in the abolition of Dongchang Prefecture.
