= Shenxian =

Shenxian may refer to:

- Xian (Taoism), or shenxian (神仙), Taoist immortal. Shen Xian is that part of our soul, which is immortal. With every new period we are on earth it re-incarnates. Together with the Yuan shen it forms the complete soul. The yuan shen is each incarnation different, depending on the parents you have chosen.
- Shen County or Shenxian (莘县), in Shandong province

== See also ==
- Shengzhou, formerly known as Shengxian, a county-level city in Zhejiang province
