= Guyun =

Guyun may refer to:

- Guyún (1908–1987), Cuban guitarist and composer
- Guyun, Shandong, a town in Shen County, Shandong, China
