= Dianji =

Diànjí (店集) may refer to the following locations in China:

- Dianji, Anhui, town in Woyang County
- Dianji, Shandong, town in Jimo
