= Yandian, Shen County =

Yandian 燕店镇
- Town
- Location in Shandong Yandian (China)
- Coordinates: 36°18′33″N 115°36′22″E
- Country: People's Republic of China
- Province: Shandong
- Prefecture-level city: Liaocheng
- County: Shen
- Village-level divisions: 34 villages
- Elevation: 43 m (141 ft)
- Time zone: UTC+8 (China Standard)
- Area code: 0635

Yandian (Chinese: 燕店; pinyin: Yàndiàn) is a town in Shen County in western Shandong province, China, located about 10 kilometres (6.2 mi) northwest of the county seat. As of 2011, it has 34 villages under its administration.

== See also ==
- List of township-level divisions of Shandong
