= Weizhuang, Shen County =

Weizhuang 魏庄镇
- Town
- Location in Shandong Weizhuang (China)
- Coordinates: 36°20′59″N 115°33′09″E
- Country: People's Republic of China
- Province: Shandong
- Prefecture-level city: Liaocheng
- County: Shen
- Time zone: UTC+8 (China Standard)

Weizhuang (Chinese: 魏庄镇) is a town in Shen County, Liaocheng, in western Shandong province, China.
