= Gucheng, Shen County =

Gucheng 古城镇
- Town
- Location in Shandong Gucheng (China)
- Coordinates: 35°55′37″N 115°37′58″E
- Country: People's Republic of China
- Province: Shandong
- Prefecture-level city: Liaocheng
- County: Shen
- Time zone: UTC+8 (China Standard)

Gucheng (Chinese: 古城镇) is a town in Shen County, Liaocheng, in western Shandong province, China.
