= Hedian, Shandong =

Hedian 河店镇
- Town
- Location in Shandong Hedian (China)
- Coordinates: 36°19′48″N 115°40′57″E
- Country: People's Republic of China
- Province: Shandong
- Prefecture-level city: Liaocheng
- County: Shen
- Time zone: UTC+8 (China Standard)

Hedian (Chinese: 河店镇) is a town in Shen County, Liaocheng, in western Shandong province, China.
