= Dongduzhuang =

Dongduzhuang 董杜庄镇
- Town
- Location in Shandong Dongduzhuang (China)
- Coordinates: 36°11′33″N 115°29′57″E
- Country: People's Republic of China
- Province: Shandong
- Prefecture-level city: Liaocheng
- County: Shen
- Time zone: UTC+8 (China Standard)

Dongduzhuang (Chinese: 董杜庄镇) is a town in Shen County, Liaocheng, in western Shandong province, China.
