= Dawangzhai =

Dawangzhai 大王寨镇
- Town
- Location in Shandong Dawangzhai (China)
- Coordinates: 36°18′47″N 115°30′52″E
- Country: People's Republic of China
- Province: Shandong
- Prefecture-level city: Liaocheng
- County: Shen
- Time zone: UTC+8 (China Standard)

Dawangzhai (Chinese: 大王寨镇) is a town in Shen County, Liaocheng, in western Shandong province, China.
