= Zhanglu =

Zhanglu 张鲁镇
- Town
- Location in Shandong Zhanglu (China)
- Coordinates: 36°14′44″N 115°31′20″E
- Country: People's Republic of China
- Province: Shandong
- Prefecture-level city: Liaocheng
- County: Shen
- Time zone: UTC+8 (China Standard)

Zhanglu (Chinese: 张鲁镇) is a town in Shen County, Liaocheng, in western Shandong province, China.
