= Meizhong =

Meizhong 妹冢镇
- Town
- Location in Shandong Meizhong (China)
- Coordinates: 36°06′18″N 115°32′40″E
- Country: People's Republic of China
- Province: Shandong
- Prefecture-level city: Liaocheng
- County: Shen
- Time zone: UTC+8 (China Standard)

Meizhong (Chinese: 妹冢镇) is a town in Shen County, Liaocheng, in western Shandong province, China.
