= Guancheng, Shandong =

Guancheng 观城镇
- Town
- Location in Shandong Guancheng (China)
- Coordinates: 35°56′29″N 115°22′42″E
- Country: People's Republic of China
- Province: Shandong
- Prefecture-level city: Liaocheng
- County: Shen
- Time zone: UTC+8 (China Standard)

Guancheng (Chinese: 观城镇) is a town in Shen County, Liaocheng, in western Shandong province, China.
