= Yingtaoyuan =

Yingtaoyuan 樱桃园镇
- Town
- Location in Shandong Yingtaoyuan (China)
- Coordinates: 35°54′12″N 115°28′40″E
- Country: People's Republic of China
- Province: Shandong
- Prefecture-level city: Liaocheng
- County: Shen
- Time zone: UTC+8 (China Standard)

Yingtaoyuan (Chinese: 樱桃园镇) is a town in Shen County, Liaocheng, in western Shandong province, China.
