= Zhangzhai, Shandong =

Zhangzhai 张寨镇
- Town
- Location in Shandong Zhangzhai (China)
- Coordinates: 36°03′39″N 115°30′18″E
- Country: People's Republic of China
- Province: Shandong
- Prefecture-level city: Liaocheng
- County: Shen
- Time zone: UTC+8 (China Standard)

Zhangzhai (Chinese: 张寨镇) is a town in Shen County, Liaocheng, in western Shandong province, China.
