= Liaocheng Sports Park Stadium =

Sports venue in Liaocheng, China

- Full name: Liaocheng Sports Park Stadium
- Location: Liaocheng, China
- Capacity: 30,000

Liaocheng Sports Park Stadium is a multi-purpose stadium in Liaocheng, China. It is used mostly for football matches and it opened in 2013.
