= Shibalipu, Shandong =

Shibalipu 十八里铺镇
- Town
- Location in Shandong Shibalipu (China)
- Coordinates: 36°10′33″N 115°38′37″E
- Country: People's Republic of China
- Province: Shandong
- Prefecture-level city: Liaocheng
- County: Shen
- Time zone: UTC+8 (China Standard)

Shibalipu (Chinese: 十八里铺镇) is a town in Shen County, Liaocheng, in western Shandong province, China.
