= Dazhangjia =

Dazhangjia 大张家镇
- Town
- Location in Shandong Dazhangjia (China)
- Coordinates: 35°53′09″N 115°23′51″E
- Country: People's Republic of China
- Province: Shandong
- Prefecture-level city: Liaocheng
- County: Shen
- Time zone: UTC+8 (China Standard)

Dazhangjia (Chinese: 大张家镇) is a town in Shen County, Liaocheng, in western Shandong province, China.
