= Chaocheng =

Chaocheng 朝城镇
- Town
- Location in Shandong Chaocheng (China)
- Coordinates: 36°03′24″N 115°34′45″E
- Country: People's Republic of China
- Province: Shandong
- Prefecture-level city: Liaocheng
- County: Shen
- Time zone: UTC+8 (China Standard)

Chaocheng (Chinese: 朝城镇) is a town in Shen County, Liaocheng, in western Shandong province, China.
