= Wangfeng =

Wangfeng 王奉镇
- Town
- Location in Shandong Wangfeng (China)
- Coordinates: 36°18′59″N 115°25′55″E
- Country: People's Republic of China
- Province: Shandong
- Prefecture-level city: Liaocheng
- County: Shen
- Time zone: UTC+8 (China Standard)

Wangfeng (Chinese: 王奉镇) is a town in Shen County, Liaocheng, in western Shandong province, China.
