= Wangcun, Qingdao =

Wangcun 王村镇
- Town
- Location in Shandong
- Coordinates: 36°30′50″N 120°51′06″E
- Country: People's Republic of China
- Province: Shandong
- Sub-provincial city: Qingdao
- District: Jimo
- Elevation: 25 m (82 ft)
- Time zone: UTC+8 (China Standard)
- Area code: 0532

Wangcun (Chinese: 王村; pinyin: Wángcūn) is a former town in the eastern jurisdiction of Jimo City in eastern Shandong province, China, located about 39 kilometres (24 mi) east-northeast of downtown Jimo. In 2012, as part of an administrative restructuring, it was merged into the neighboring town of Tianheng.

== See also ==
- List of township-level divisions of Shandong
