= Guyun, Shandong =

Guyun 古云镇
- Town
- Location in Shandong Guyun (China)
- Coordinates: 35°48′51″N 115°23′18″E
- Country: People's Republic of China
- Province: Shandong
- Prefecture-level city: Liaocheng
- County: Shen
- Time zone: UTC+8 (China Standard)

Guyun (Chinese: 古云镇) is a town in Shen County, Liaocheng, in western Shandong province, China.
