= Linnan =

Surname list

Linnan is a family name, possibly of Irish origin.

It is the name of the following people:

- Frank Linnan (Michael Francis Linnan) (1895 - 1981), American Football player
- Laura Linnan (living), American academic
- Luke E. Linnan (1895 - 1975), American judge
