= Boping =

Boping 博平镇
- Town
- Location in Shandong Boping (China)
- Coordinates: 36°35′24″N 116°06′44″E
- Country: People's Republic of China
- Province: Shandong
- Prefecture-level city: Liaocheng
- County: Chiping
- Time zone: UTC+8 (China Standard)

Boping (Chinese: 博平镇) is a town in Chiping County, Liaocheng, in western Shandong province, China.
