= Dianji, Shandong =

Dianji 店集镇
- Town
- Location in Shandong
- Coordinates: 36°32′25″N 120°40′01″E
- Country: People's Republic of China
- Province: Shandong
- Sub-provincial city: Qingdao
- District: Jimo
- Elevation: 22 m (72 ft)
- Time zone: UTC+8 (China Standard)
- Area code: 0532

Dianji (Chinese: 店集; pinyin: Diànjí) is a former town in eastern Shandong province, China, located around 24 kilometres (15 mi) northeast of Jimo, which administers it. In 2012, as part of an administrative restructuring, it was merged into the neighboring town of Jinkou, Shandong.

== See also ==
- List of township-level divisions of Shandong
