= Shen County =

Shenxian 莘县
- County
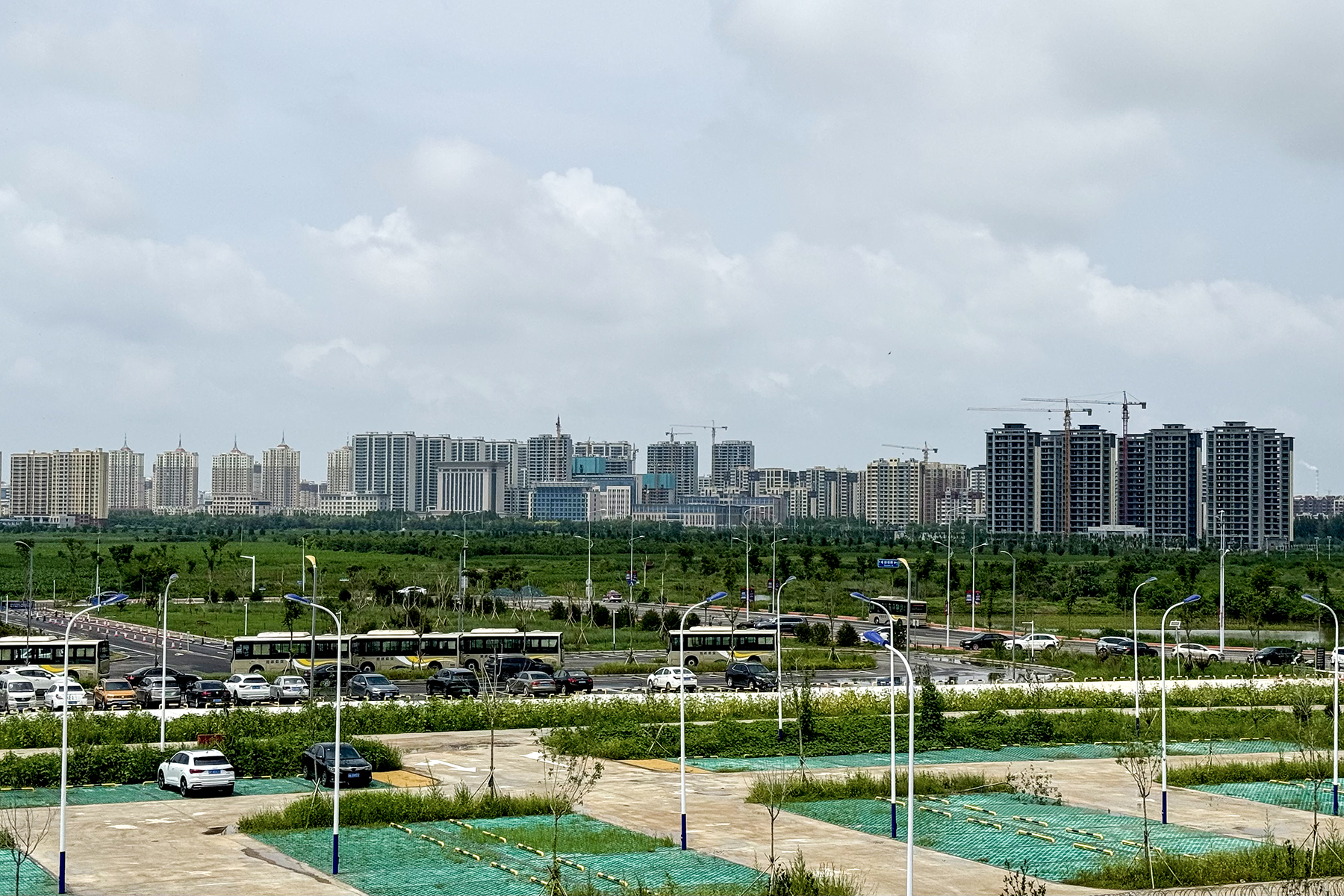

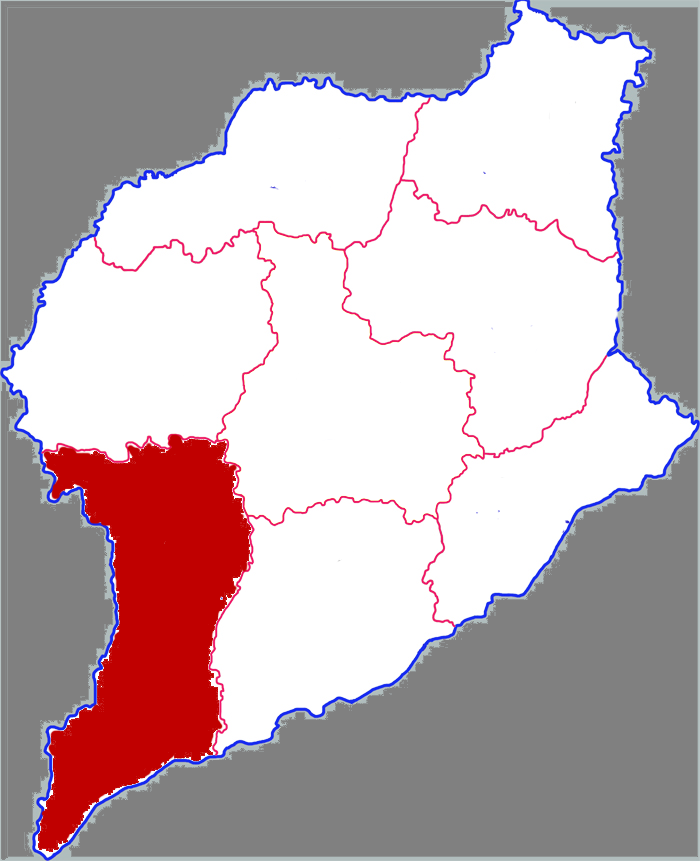
- Shen County in Liaocheng

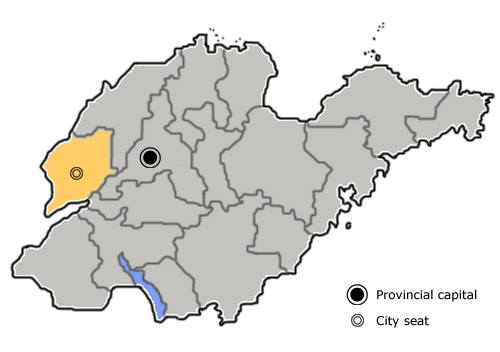
- Liaocheng in Shandong
- Coordinates (Shen County government): 36°14′02″N 115°40′16″E
- Country: People's Republic of China
- Province: Shandong
- Prefecture-level city: Liaocheng
- Township-level divisions: 4 subdistricts 16 towns 4 townships
- County seat: Yanta Subdistrict (燕塔街道)

Area
  - Total: 1,420 km^{2} (550 sq mi)
- Elevation: 42 m (138 ft)

Population
  - Total: 982,700
  - Density: 692/km^{2} (1,790/sq mi)
- Time zone: UTC+8 (China Standard)
- Postal code: 252400
- Area code: 0635
- Website: sdsx.gov.cn

Shen County (simplified Chinese: 莘县; traditional Chinese: 莘縣; pinyin: Shēn Xiàn), or Shenxian, is a county of western Shandong province, People's Republic of China, bordering Henan to the south and southwest and Hebei to the west. It is the southernmost county-level division of the prefecture-level city of Liaocheng.

The population was 949,768 in 1999.

It was one of two counties in which the Childless Hundred Days took place, the other being Guan County.

== Geography and climate ==
Shen County ranges in latitude from 35° 46' to 36° 25' N and in longitude from 115° 20' to 115° 44' E, reaching 68 kilometres (42 mi) in north–south extent and 32 km (20 mi) in east–west width, and covers an area of 1,387.74 km^{2} (535.81 sq mi). It borders Guan County and Dongchangfu District to the north, Yanggu County across the Jinxian River (金线河) to the east, Puyang City of Henan to the south, and Handan City of Hebei to the west.

Shen County has a monsoon-influenced, continental semi-arid climate (Köppen BSk) with four distinct seasons. Winters are cold and very dry, with a 24-hour average temperature of −1.8 °C (28.8 °F) in January, while summers are hot and humid, with a 24-hour average temperature of 26.8 °C (80.2 °F) in July; the annual mean is 13.4 °C (56.1 °F). Nearly half of the annual rainfall occurs in July and August alone.

Climate data for Shenxian, elevation 39 m (128 ft), (1991–2020 normals, extremes 1981–2010)
Month	Jan	Feb	Mar	Apr	May	Jun	Jul	Aug	Sep	Oct	Nov	Dec	Year
Record high °C (°F)	16.4 (61.5)	23.6 (74.5)	29.1 (84.4)	33.5 (92.3)	38.7 (101.7)	41.8 (107.2)	40.4 (104.7)	36.7 (98.1)	35.9 (96.6)	35.1 (95.2)	26.7 (80.1)	21.3 (70.3)	41.8 (107.2)
Mean daily maximum °C (°F)	4.2 (39.6)	8.4 (47.1)	14.6 (58.3)	21.1 (70.0)	26.5 (79.7)	31.9 (89.4)	32.0 (89.6)	30.4 (86.7)	27.0 (80.6)	21.3 (70.3)	12.8 (55.0)	5.9 (42.6)	19.7 (67.4)
Daily mean °C (°F)	−1.4 (29.5)	2.3 (36.1)	8.4 (47.1)	14.8 (58.6)	20.5 (68.9)	25.7 (78.3)	27.2 (81.0)	25.6 (78.1)	20.9 (69.6)	14.8 (58.6)	6.9 (44.4)	0.4 (32.7)	13.8 (56.9)
Mean daily minimum °C (°F)	−5.6 (21.9)	−2.3 (27.9)	3.2 (37.8)	9.2 (48.6)	14.8 (58.6)	20.2 (68.4)	23.2 (73.8)	21.8 (71.2)	16.3 (61.3)	9.8 (49.6)	2.3 (36.1)	−3.6 (25.5)	9.1 (48.4)
Record low °C (°F)	−20.0 (−4.0)	−17.4 (0.7)	−8.6 (16.5)	−2.1 (28.2)	3.3 (37.9)	8.8 (47.8)	16.0 (60.8)	12.5 (54.5)	3.2 (37.8)	−2.3 (27.9)	−18.6 (−1.5)	−16.3 (2.7)	−20.0 (−4.0)
Average precipitation mm (inches)	3.6 (0.14)	8.4 (0.33)	12.3 (0.48)	28.6 (1.13)	45.2 (1.78)	55.8 (2.20)	129.7 (5.11)	135.8 (5.35)	46.6 (1.83)	30.1 (1.19)	17.0 (0.67)	5.0 (0.20)	518.1 (20.41)
Average precipitation days (≥ 0.1 mm)	2.1	3.1	3.4	5.0	5.8	7.1	10.8	8.9	6.6	5.2	4.0	2.4	64.4
Average snowy days	2.5	2.7	0.7	0.2	0	0	0	0	0	0	0.8	2.1	9
Average relative humidity (%)	65	61	58	63	68	64	79	84	78	71	70	68	69
Mean monthly sunshine hours	141.7	148.5	190.6	212.1	236.9	215.4	175.1	174.1	173.5	174.5	149.6	144.6	2,136.6
Percentage possible sunshine	46	48	51	54	54	49	40	42	47	51	49	48	48
Source: China Meteorological Administration

== Administrative divisions ==
There are 4 subdistricts, 16 towns and 4 townships in the county:

=== Subdistricts ===
- Yanta Subdistrict (燕塔街道)
- Shenting Subdistrict (莘亭街道)
- Shenzhou Subdistrict (莘州街道)
- Donglu Subdistrict (东鲁街道)

=== Towns ===
- Zhanglu (张鲁镇)
- Chaocheng (朝城镇)
- Guancheng (观城镇)
- Gucheng (古城镇)
- Dazhangjia (大张家镇)
- Guyun (古云镇)
- Shibalipu (十八里铺镇)
- Yandian (燕店镇)
- Dongduzhuang (董杜庄镇)
- Wangfeng (王奉镇)
- Yingtaoyuan (樱桃园镇)
- Hedian (河店镇)
- Meizhong (妹冢镇)
- Weizhuang (魏庄镇)
- Zhangzhai (张寨镇)
- Dawangzhai (大王寨镇)

=== Townships ===
- Zudian Township (俎店乡)
- Xuzhuang Township (徐庄乡)
- Wangzhuangji Township (王庄集乡)
- Shiziyuan Township (柿子园乡)
- Meizhong Township (妹冢乡)

== Historical monuments ==
- Han Family Tombs (韩氏家族墓地), a monumental complex at the graves of the local Tang-era jiedushi Han Yunzhong and his relatives. The complex includes a pair of giant tortoise-borne stelae (reminiscent of those at Shou Qiu) and other assorted statuary, in the spirit way tradition. It is on the national list of major historical and cultural sites. The complex is located at 36°11′11″N 115°30′44″E, near Liangpiying Village (梁丕营村) of Dongduzhuang Town (董杜庄镇).
- Tomb of Ma Benzhai (1902—1944), the leader of a Hui volunteer unit that fought against the Japanese invaders in the Second Sino-Japanese War.
