= Liaocheng =

Liaocheng 聊城市
- Prefecture-level city
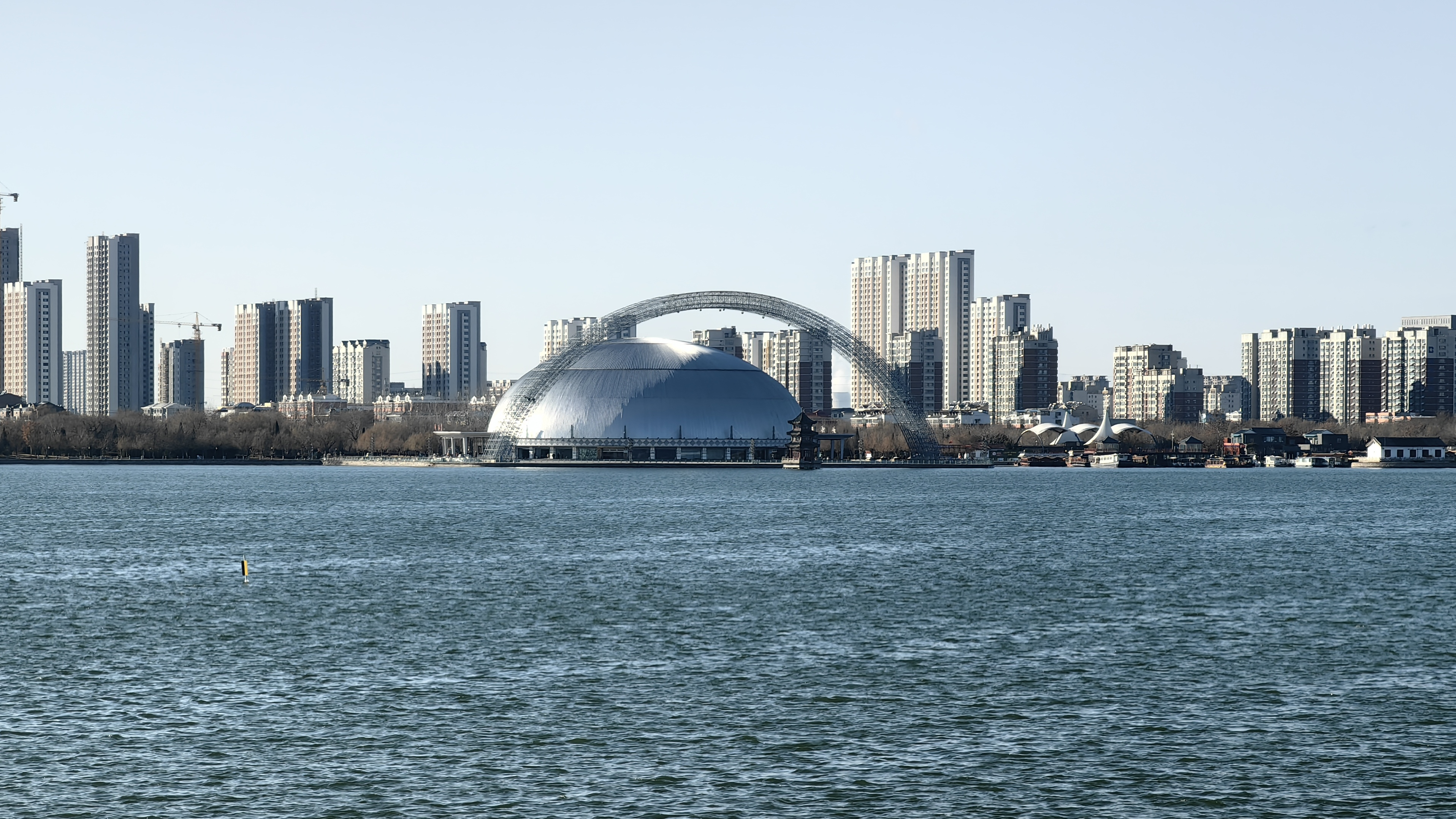
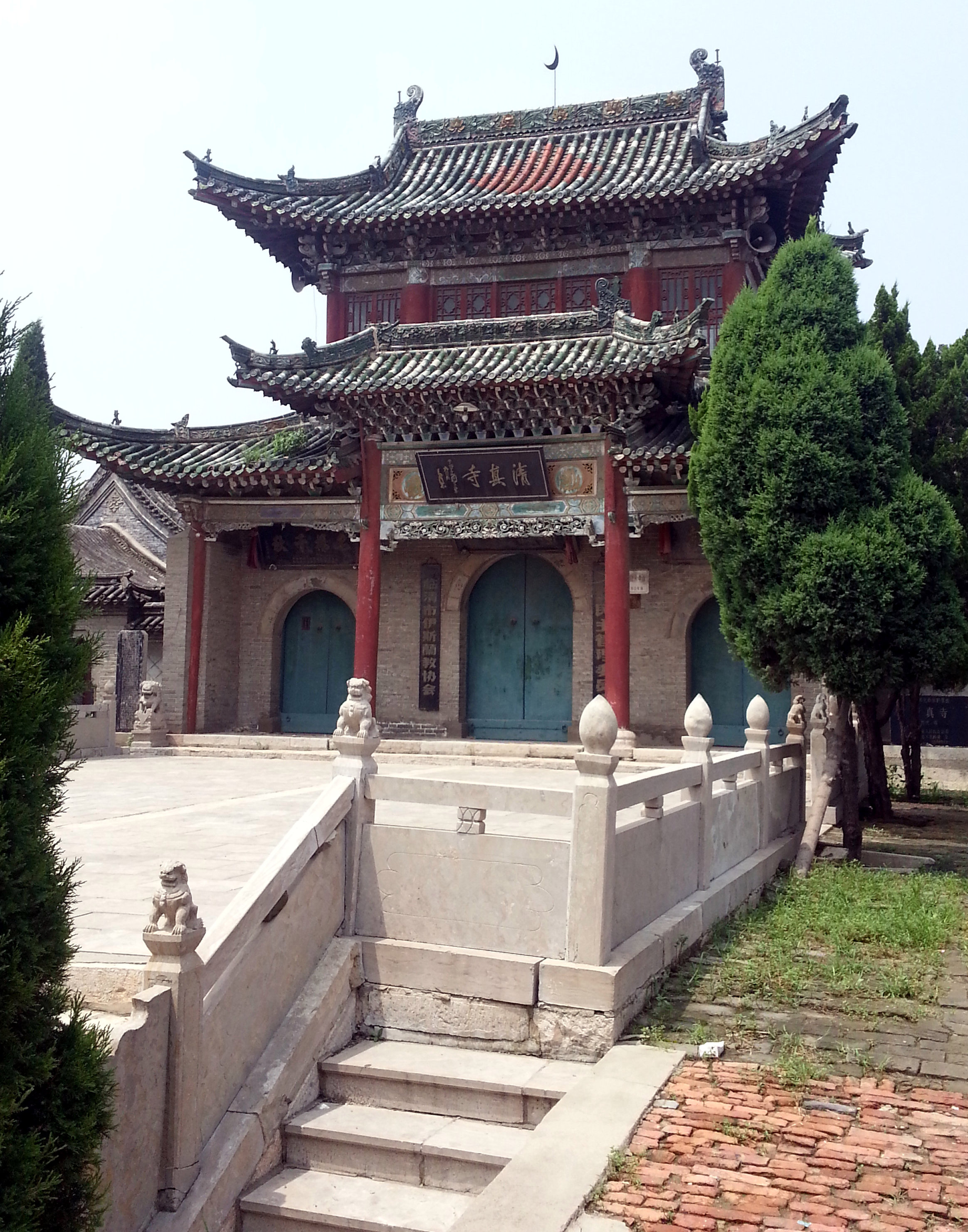
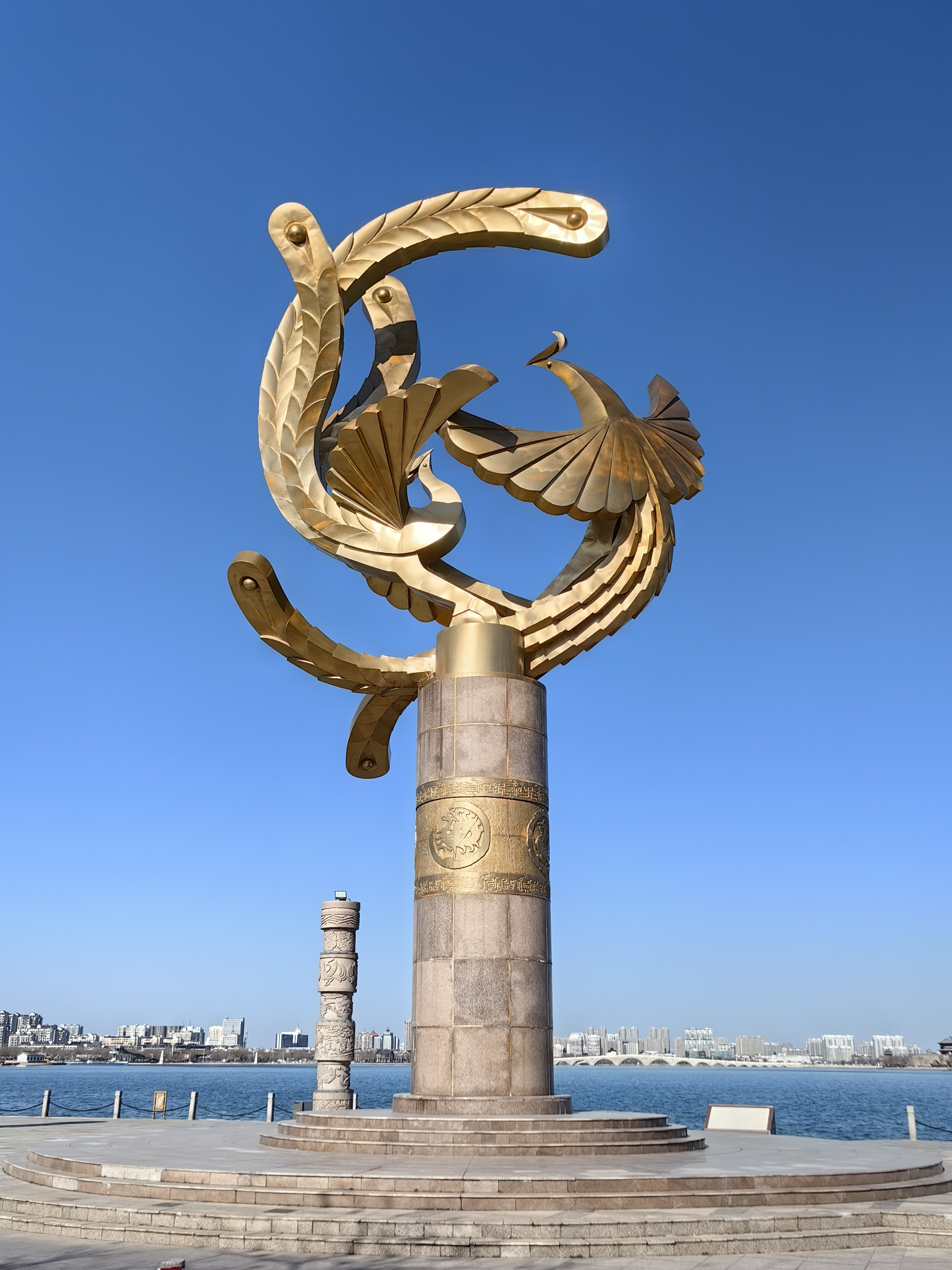
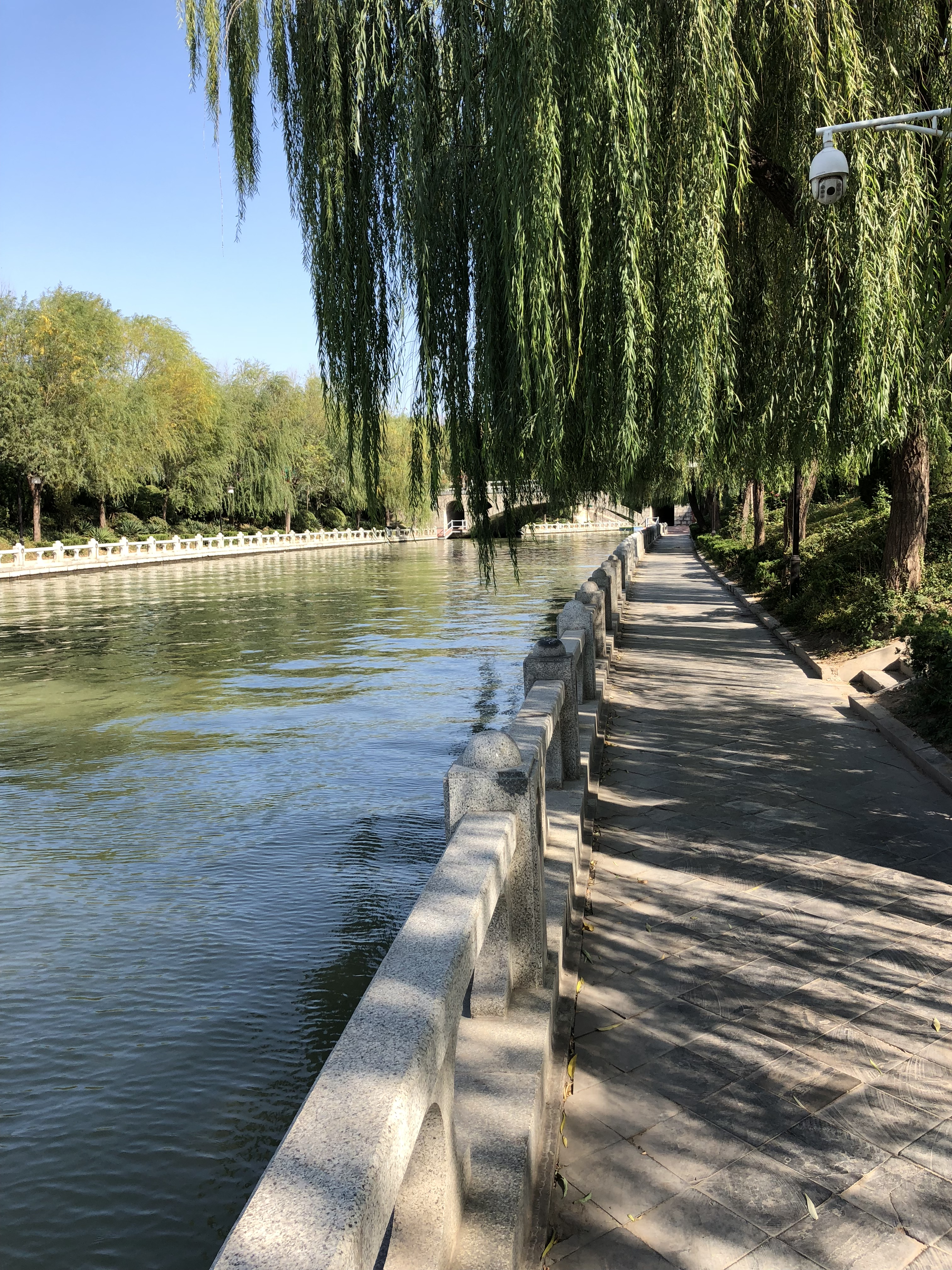
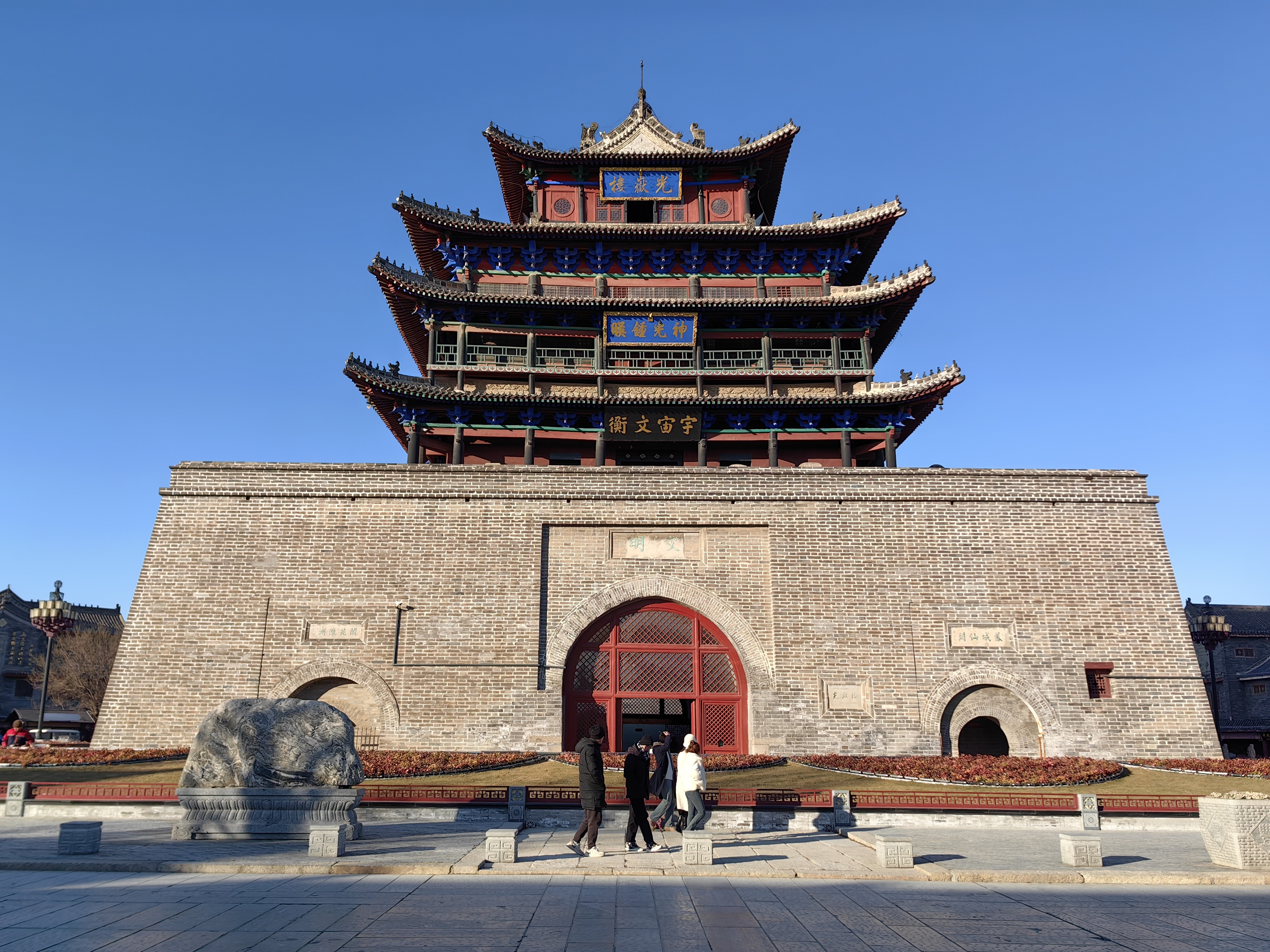
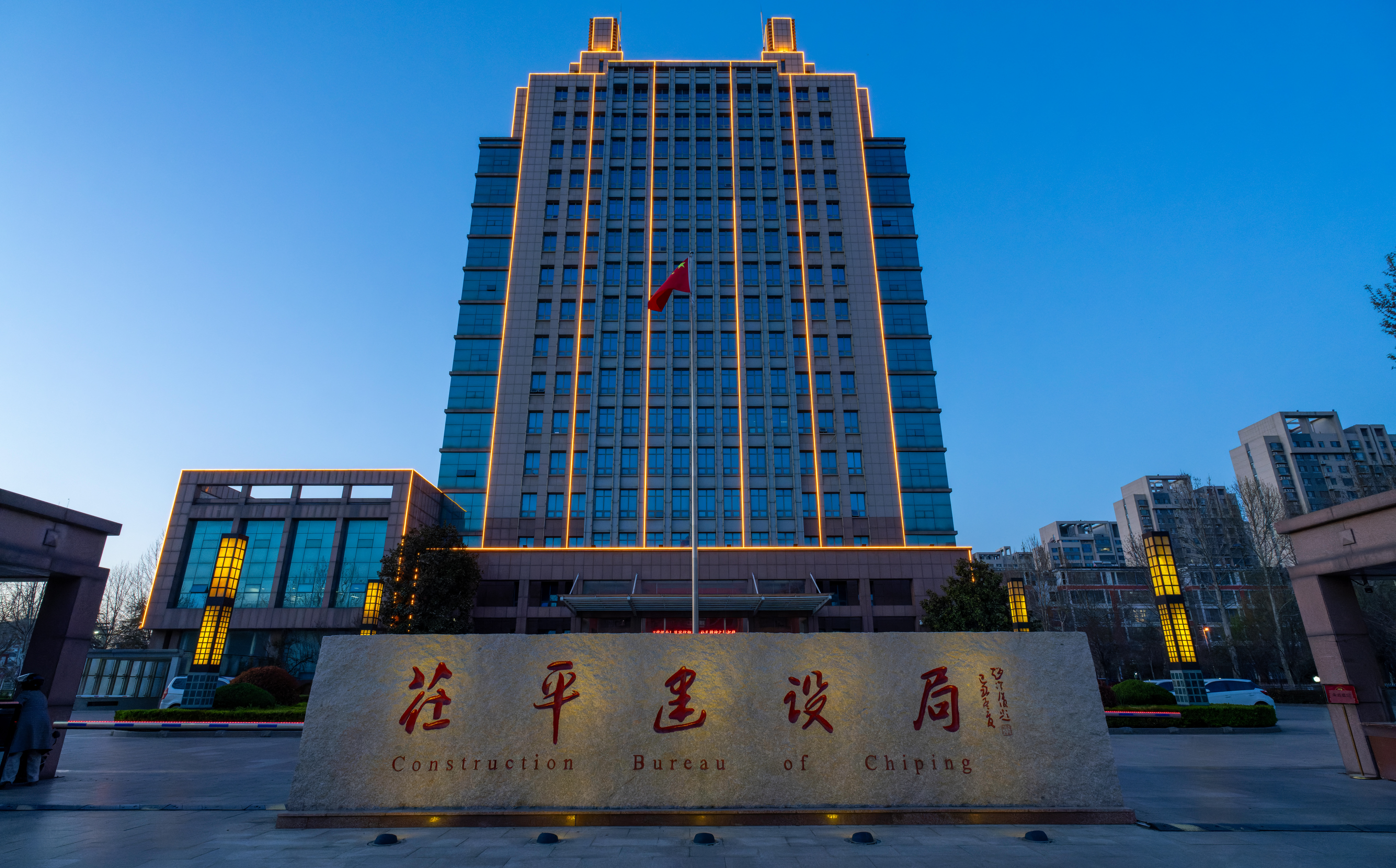
- Dongchang Lake Linqing Western Mosque Jinfeng Square branch of Grand Canal Guangyue Tower Chiping

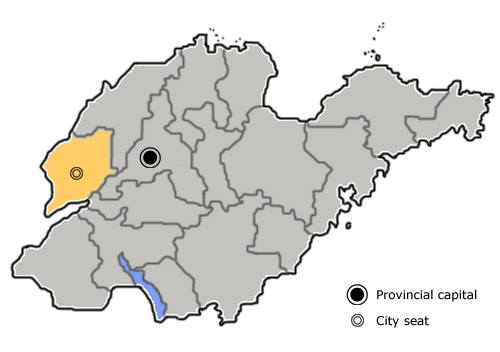
- Location of Liaocheng in Shandong
- Interactive map of Liaocheng
- Coordinates (Liaocheng municipal government): 36°27′21″N 115°59′07″E
- Country: China
- Province: Shandong
- County-level divisions: 8
- Township-level divisions: 134
- Municipal seat: Dongchangfu District

Government
  - CPC Secretary: Song Yuanfang (宋远方)
  - Mayor: Lin Fenghai (林峰海)

Area
  - Prefecture-level city: 8,721 km^{2} (3,367 sq mi)
  - Urban: 1,254 km^{2} (484 sq mi)
  - Metro: 1,254 km^{2} (484 sq mi)

Population (2020 census for total, 2010 census for otherwise)
  - Prefecture-level city: 5,952,128
  - Density: 682.5/km^{2} (1,768/sq mi)
  - Urban: 1,229,768
  - Urban density: 980.7/km^{2} (2,540/sq mi)
  - Metro: 1,229,768
  - Metro density: 980.7/km^{2} (2,540/sq mi)

GDP
  - Prefecture-level city: CN¥ 315 billion US$ 47.6 billion
  - Per capita: CN¥ 51,935; US$ 7,848
- Time zone: UTC+8 (China Standard)
- Postal code: 252000
- Area code: 0635
- ISO 3166 code: CN-SD-15
- License Plate Prefix: 鲁P
- Climate: Monsoon-influenced hot-summer humid continental climate (Dwa)
- Website: www.liaocheng.gov.cn

Liaocheng (Chinese: 聊城; pinyin: Liáochéng) is a prefecture-level city in western Shandong province, China. It borders the provincial capital of Jinan to the southeast, Dezhou to the northeast, Tai'an to the south, and the provinces of Hebei and Henan to the west. The Grand Canal flows through the city center. Its population was 5,789,863 at the 2010 census of whom 1,229,768 lived in the built-up area made up of Donchangfu district, even though large parts remain rural.

== History ==
=== Pre-Qin era ===
During the Spring and Autumn period, the area was part of the State of Qi as Liaocheng Town (聊城邑). The Strategies of the Warring States Qi section records: "The general of Yan captured Liaocheng." The Zuo Zhuan also notes: "Liao and She, the two cities, were the western frontier of Qi." The modern city takes its name from the ancient Liaocheng.

=== Imperial era ===
In the Qin dynasty, Liaocheng County was established under Dong Commandery, and this administrative arrangement continued through the Han period. In the 222 under Wei of the Three Kingdoms, it was reassigned to the Principality of Pingyuan, later changed to Pingyuan Commandery, a system retained by the Jin dynasty. In 499 under the Northern Wei, the county seat was moved to Wangcheng in the northeast of today’s urban area, serving as the administrative center of Pingyuan Commandery.

In the Sui dynasty, Pingyuan Commandery was abolished in 583, and in 596 Bo Prefecture was established, which was later abolished during the Daye era, with Liaocheng County reassigned to Wuyang Commandery. In the 1st year of the Tang Wude era (618), Liaocheng County was placed under Weizhou of Hebei Circuit, and in 621 Bo Prefecture was reestablished. In 906, it was renamed Liaoyi County; during the Five Dynasties, it reverted to Liaocheng County. In 992 of the Northern Song dynasty, the county seat was moved to the site of the present city.

In the Yuan dynasty, during the 1267, Bozhou Circuit (博州路) was established with its seat at Liaocheng County. In 1276 it was renamed Dongchang Circuit. In the Ming dynasty, early in the Hongwu reign, it became Dongchang Prefecture, with its seat at Liaocheng County. The Qing dynasty retained this structure, and the area belonged to the Jidong Taiwu Lin Circuit.

=== Modern era ===
In the Republic of China, the prefectural system was abolished in 1913 and Liaocheng County was placed under Jixi Circuit, then under Donglin Circuit in the following year. In 1925, it was reassigned to Dongchang Circuit. After the National Government abolished the circuit system in 1928, the county came under the Sixth Administrative Inspectorate District of Shandong Province. In November 1938, Liaocheng was occupied by the Imperial Japanese Army. After the Japanese withdrawal, Nationalist troops retook the city. In December 1946, the People’s Liberation Army attacked Liaocheng, and the Nationalist forces withdrew.

In August 1949, Liaocheng was detached from Shandong and attached to Pingyuan. In November 1952, Pingyuan was dissolved and Liaocheng returned to Shandong. In 1967, Liaocheng Prefecture was reorganized as Liaocheng District. In August 1983, Liaocheng County was reconstituted as Liaocheng City (county-level). In March 1998, Liaocheng District was abolished and replaced by the prefecture-level Liaocheng City; the former county-level Liaocheng City (city core) became Dongchangfu District. In June 2019, the State Council approved the abolition of Chiping County and it was replaced by Chiping District. In 2007, the city is named China's top ten livable cities by Chinese Cities Brand Value Report, which was released at 2007 Beijing Summit of China Cities Forum.

== Administration ==
The prefecture-level city of Liaocheng administers eight county-level divisions, including two districts, one county-level city, and five counties.

- Dongchangfu District (东昌府区)
- Chiping District (茌平区)
- Linqing City (临清市)
- Yanggu County (阳谷县)
- Dong'e County (东阿县)
- Gaotang County (高唐县)
- Guan County (冠县)
- Shen County (莘县)

These are further divided into 134 township-level divisions.

Map
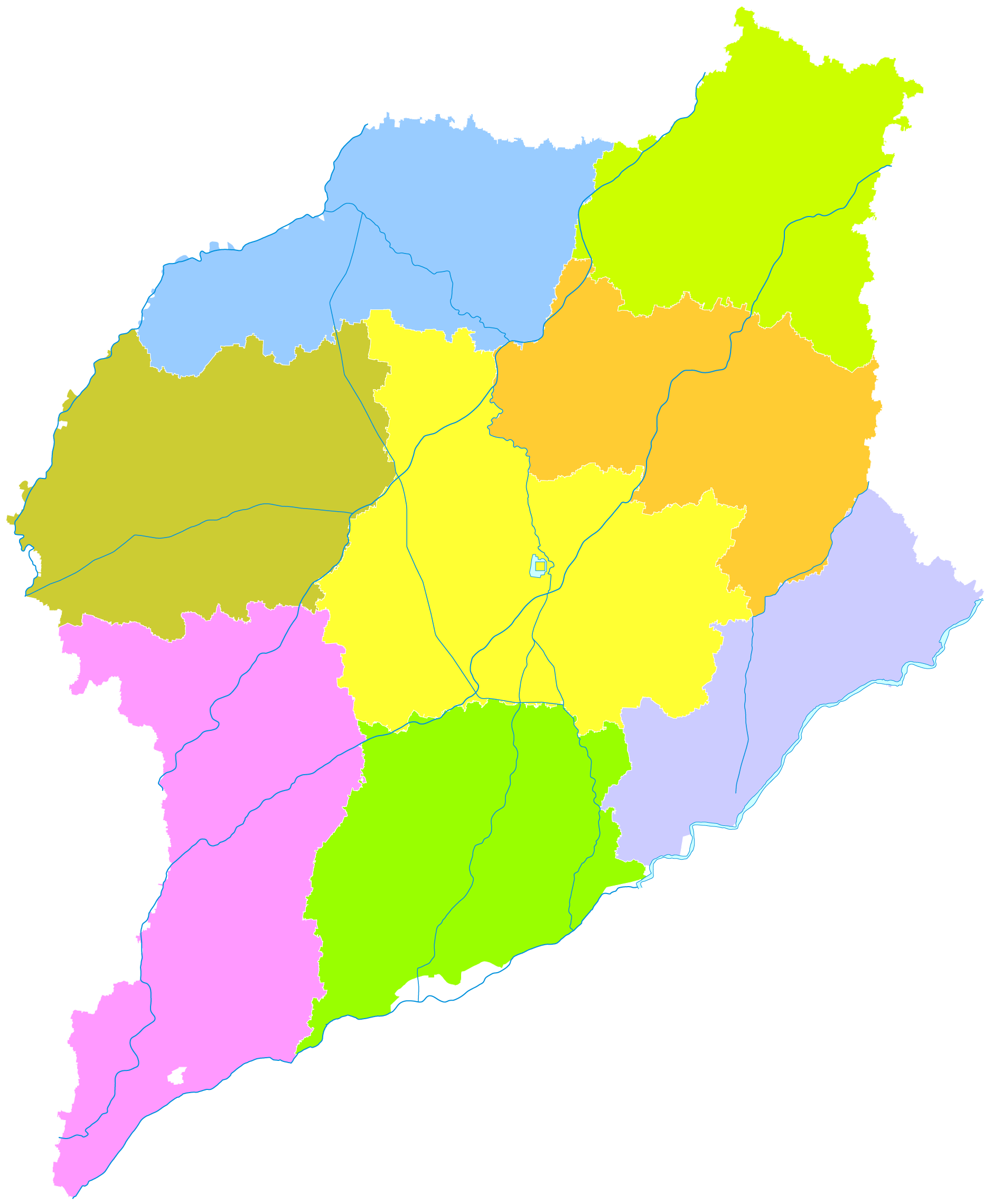

== Climate ==
Liaocheng has a humid continental climate (Köppen: Dwa), with four well-defined seasons. It is one of the cities in the world with the lowest latitude that features this type of climate.

Climate data for Liaocheng, elevation 33 m (108 ft), (1991–2020 normals, extremes 1981–2010)
Month	Jan	Feb	Mar	Apr	May	Jun	Jul	Aug	Sep	Oct	Nov	Dec	Year
Record high °C (°F)	15.8 (60.4)	21.8 (71.2)	28.4 (83.1)	33.6 (92.5)	37.2 (99.0)	40.7 (105.3)	40.7 (105.3)	36.3 (97.3)	36.1 (97.0)	34.5 (94.1)	26.5 (79.7)	19.0 (66.2)	40.7 (105.3)
Mean daily maximum °C (°F)	4.2 (39.6)	8.3 (46.9)	14.7 (58.5)	21.2 (70.2)	26.6 (79.9)	31.5 (88.7)	31.9 (89.4)	30.5 (86.9)	27.1 (80.8)	21.3 (70.3)	12.7 (54.9)	5.8 (42.4)	19.7 (67.4)
Daily mean °C (°F)	−1.6 (29.1)	2.1 (35.8)	8.3 (46.9)	14.9 (58.8)	20.4 (68.7)	25.3 (77.5)	26.9 (80.4)	25.6 (78.1)	20.9 (69.6)	14.5 (58.1)	6.8 (44.2)	0.3 (32.5)	13.7 (56.6)
Mean daily minimum °C (°F)	−5.9 (21.4)	−2.6 (27.3)	3.2 (37.8)	9.4 (48.9)	14.8 (58.6)	19.9 (67.8)	23.1 (73.6)	21.9 (71.4)	16.4 (61.5)	9.6 (49.3)	2.2 (36.0)	−3.9 (25.0)	9.0 (48.2)
Record low °C (°F)	−20.6 (−5.1)	−16.9 (1.6)	−10.1 (13.8)	−1.7 (28.9)	3.6 (38.5)	10.2 (50.4)	16.9 (62.4)	11.7 (53.1)	4.9 (40.8)	−2.1 (28.2)	−17.9 (−0.2)	−16.9 (1.6)	−20.6 (−5.1)
Average precipitation mm (inches)	4.0 (0.16)	8.7 (0.34)	11.0 (0.43)	31.7 (1.25)	45.8 (1.80)	72.3 (2.85)	156.5 (6.16)	150.8 (5.94)	50.3 (1.98)	30.4 (1.20)	19.7 (0.78)	5.2 (0.20)	586.4 (23.09)
Average precipitation days (≥ 0.1 mm)	2.1	3.3	3.1	5.0	6.6	7.6	10.8	9.7	6.6	5.4	4.1	2.5	66.8
Average snowy days	2.4	2.7	0.7	0.1	0	0	0	0	0	0	0.8	1.9	8.6
Average relative humidity (%)	64	60	56	62	67	66	80	84	79	73	70	68	69
Mean monthly sunshine hours	135.5	140.4	187.8	208.5	235.4	209.5	172.3	174.4	168.9	165.0	141.0	135.9	2,074.6
Percentage possible sunshine	44	45	50	53	54	48	39	42	46	48	46	45	47
Source: China Meteorological Administration

== Education ==
- Liaocheng University (聊城大学)
- Liaocheng NO.1 high school (聊城一中)

== Notable people ==
- Fu Sinian (傅斯年; 1896–1950)
- Ji Xianlin (季羡林; 1911–2009)
- Kong Fansen (孔繁森; 1944–1994)
- Wei Fenghe (魏凤和; b.1954)
- Chen Xu (陳旭; b. 1962)

== Attractions ==
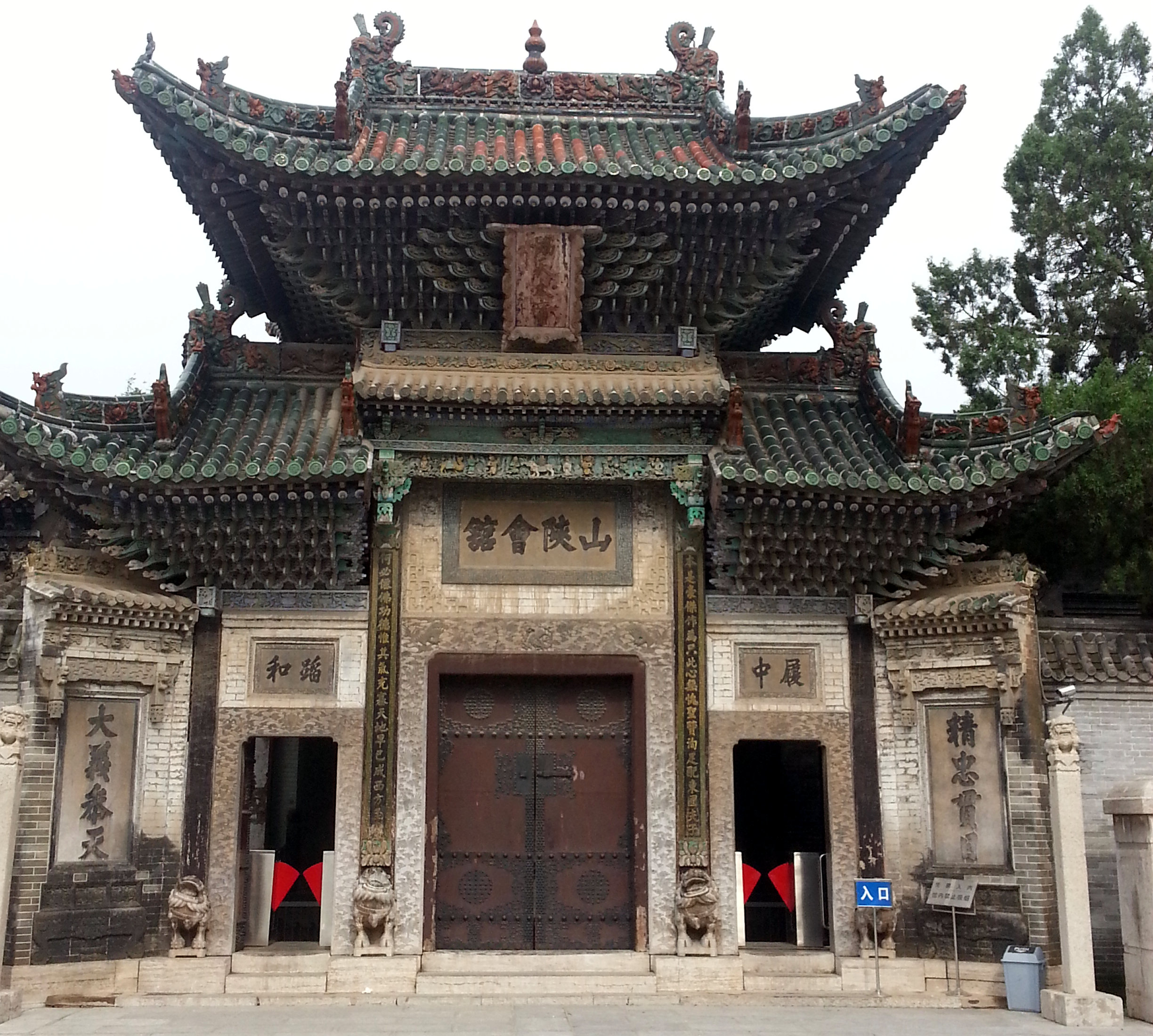
Shanxi-Shaanxi Assembly Hall

- Shanxi-Shaanxi Assembly Hall (short Shanshan Hall, Chinese: 山陕会馆; pinyin: Shān–Shǎn Huìguǎn)
- Guangyue Tower (光岳楼; Guāngyuè Lóu)
- Iron Tower
- Lion Building (site where - according to legend - Wu Song fought and killed Ximen Qing)
- Linqing Mosque
- Liaocheng Sports Park Stadium

== Transportation ==
The town is served by Liaocheng railway station as well as a station on the high-speed network, Liaocheng West railway station.

== Sister cities ==
Liaocheng is a sister city of the following cities:

- Uiryeong County, South Gyeongsang, South Korea (since June 7, 2001)
- Blacktown, New South Wales, Australia (October 14, 2003)
- Gwangmyeong, Gyeonggi, South Korea (May 3, 2005)
- Naberezhnye Chelny, Tatarstan, Russia (since 2009)

Furthermore, there is a partnership with the district Offenbach in Germany.
