= Wudian =

Wudian may refer to the following locations in China:

- Wudian, Anhui (武店镇), town in Fengyang County

Written as "吴店镇":

- Wudian, Guangshui, Suizhou, Hubei
- Wudian, Zaoyang, Xiangyang, Hubei
- Wudian, Shandong, town in Mudan District, Heze
