= Shatu =

Shatu may refer to:shatu

== China ==
(Shātǔ (沙土))

- Shatu, Anhui, town in Qiaocheng District, Bozhou
- Shatu, Guizhou, town in Jinsha County
- Shatu, Shandong, town in Mudan District, Heze

== Iran ==
(Shatū (شتو))

- Shatu, Iran, a village in Fars Province
