= Yuanqu =

Yuanqu may refer to:

- Yuanqu (元曲), another name for the qu form of Chinese verse
- Yuanqu County (垣曲县) in Yuncheng, Shanxi
- Yuanqu County (冤句), in Shandong during China's imperial period
