= Longwangmiao, Shandong =

Longwangmiao 龙王庙镇
- Town
- Location in Shandong Longwangmiao (China)
- Coordinates: 34°42′14″N 116°11′20″E
- Country: People's Republic of China
- Province: Shandong
- Prefecture-level city: Heze
- County: Shan
- Elevation: 46 m (151 ft)
- Time zone: UTC+8 (China Standard)
- Postal code: 274300
- Area code: 0530

Longwangmiao (simplified Chinese: 龙王庙; traditional Chinese: 龍王廟; pinyin: Lóngwángmiào; lit. 'Dragon King temple') is a town in Shan County in southwestern Shandong province, China, located 11 kilometres (6.8 mi) southeast of the county seat. As of 2011, it has 24 villages under its administration.

== See also ==
- List of township-level divisions of Shandong
