= Yuanqu County (Shandong) =

Former county of imperial China

Coordinates: 35°07′59″N 115°20′56.5″E

Yuanqu
- Traditional Chinese: 冤句縣
- Simplified Chinese: 冤句县
- Literal meaning: Bending-&-Curving County
Transcriptions
Standard Mandarin
- Hanyu Pinyin: Yuānqú xiàn
- Wade–Giles: Yüan-ch‘ü Hsien
Old Chinese
- Zhengzhang: /qon-ko/

Alternative Chinese name
- Traditional Chinese: 冤朐縣
- Simplified Chinese: 冤朐县
Transcriptions
Standard Mandarin
- Hanyu Pinyin: Yuānqú xiàn
- Wade–Giles: Yüan-ch‘ü Hsien
Old Chinese
- Zhengzhang: /qon-go/

Other names

Wanqu
- Traditional Chinese: 宛朐縣
- Simplified Chinese: 宛朐县
Transcriptions
Standard Mandarin
- Hanyu Pinyin: Wǎnqú xiàn
- Wade–Giles: Wan-ch‘ü Hsien
Old Chinese
- Zhengzhang: /qon-go/

Second alternative Chinese name
- Traditional Chinese: 宛句縣
- Simplified Chinese: 宛句县
Transcriptions
Standard Mandarin
- Hanyu Pinyin: Wǎnqú xiàn
- Wade–Giles: Wan-ch‘ü Hsien
Old Chinese
- Zhengzhang: /qon-ko/

Jiping
- Traditional Chinese: 濟平亭
- Simplified Chinese: 济平亭
- Literal meaning: Peaceful Ji Commune; Pacified Ji Commune
Transcriptions
Standard Mandarin
- Hanyu Pinyin: Jìpíng tíng
- Wade–Giles: Chi-p‘ing T‘ing

Wanting
- Traditional Chinese: 宛亭縣
- Simplified Chinese: 宛亭县
- Literal meaning: Bending-&-Straight County
Transcriptions
Standard Mandarin
- Hanyu Pinyin: Wǎntíng xiàn
- Wade–Giles: Wan-t‘ing Hsien

Yuanqu or Wanqu County, known as Wanting County after 1086, was a former county of imperial China covering most of present-day Dongming County and the western part of Mudan District in the Heze Prefecture of southwestern Shandong. Yuanqu or Wanqu was also the name of its eponymous county seat. The town was destroyed by a flood of the Yellow River in 1168, and its territory merged with Jiyin County. The ruins of the county seat were rediscovered at Longwangmiao Village in southwestern Mudan District in June 2007 by a team of archaeologists from the district government.

== Name ==
Yuānqú is the pinyin romanization of the present Mandarin pronunciation of the Chinese placename 冤句. Because the character 句 is now usually pronounced jù in its sense of "phrase" or "sentence", the town and county's name is frequently misread as Yuānjù in English sources. Although 句 now has the variant readings qú, jù, gōu, and gòu in different contexts, the Old Chinese pronunciation of all of these has been reconstructed as /*[k]ˤ(r)o.../ or as /*ko.../, with slightly different terminal consonants later developing into the modern pronunciations. Similarly, both 冤 and 宛 were originally pronounced /*qon/, leading to their interchangeable use in ancient records about the county.

Both characters in the name—meaning "curvy" or "bent"—refer to the meandering course of the Ji River, a major river which once flowed through the area but whose bed was assumed by the Yellow River during its massive 1852 flood. Lin Chuanjia further claims that "Yuan" (冤) was an occasional ancient name for the Ji. (Note: Lin's work used the character 泲 rather than the more common 濟, but the two were synonyms with regard to the ancient Shandong river.)

Under Wang Mang's Xin dynasty, Yuanqu was known as Jiping. Under the Song, the name was changed to Wanting County, from tíng’s sense of "straight" or "erect".

== Location ==
Yuanqu County covered most of present-day Dongming County and the southwestern part of what is now Mudan District, Heze Prefecture, Shandong.

The remains of Yuanqu, its chief city and seat of government, are now located near Longwangmiao Village (t 龍王廟村, s 龙王庙村, Lóngwángmiào Cūn) in Malinggang (t 馬嶺崗鎮, s 马岭岗镇, Mǎlǐnggǎng Zhèn), southwest of the central core of Mudan and northwest of present-day Caoxian.

== History ==
The territory of Yuanqu County had been a center of Chinese civilization since at least the Shang, who had their capital Bo in nearby Cao County. Sima Qian records that, under the Han, there was even a legend that the Yellow Emperor had obtained a valuable sacrificial tripod at Yuanqu. (Note: The Book of Han, however, describes the Yellow Emperor's tripod as originating at Mianhou (冕候, Miǎnhòu).) The area was part of the state of Liang during the Zhou dynasty.

The historical county was probably established under the Qin, although some sources place its creation under the Han. Under the Qin, it is said to have formed part of the Eastern Commandery (t 東郡, s 东郡, Dōng Jùn) of the Henan Area (t 河南地區, s 河南地区, Hénán Dìqū). Under the Han, it formed part of Jiyin Commandery (t 濟陰郡, s 济阴郡, Jìyīn Jùn) and was also sometimes considered part of the princely realm of Liang. Under Wang Mang's short-lived Xin dynasty, its name was changed to Jiping and it was given the status of a commune, rather than a county seat.

In Kaihuang 3 (AD 583), the Sui emperor Yang Jian (posthumously known as the "Wen" or "Literary Emperor") abolished Jiyin and organized Yuanqu as part of Cao Prefecture.

In the 860s and early 870s, the area suffered droughts but its people met with indifference or malice from Tang officials. Huang Chao, the son of a wealthy local salt merchant, tried to become one of these mandarins but failed the imperial exams and took up salt smuggling instead. When the salt smuggler Wang Xianzhi rose against the empire in nearby Changyuan County in 874, he was able to overrun several towns and even defeated the local forces under Xue Chong (薛崇, Xuē Chóng), the governor of the area's Tianping Circuit (天平道, Tiānpíng Dào). The next year, Huang Chao raised several thousand men of his own from Yuanqu and joined Wang, eventually overrunning much of the country and proclaiming the Qi dynasty before being defeated and driven to suicide in 884. (Yuanqu was the place where the Shato Turk leader Li Keyong ceased pursuing the fleeing Chao, although the would-be emperor met his end soon afterwards beside Mount Tai.)

In Yuanyou 1 (1086), the Song emperor Zhao Xu (posthumously known as "Emperor Zhezong" or the "Wise Ancestor") changed the name of the county to Wanting. Under the Jin, the county seat at Yuanqu was destroyed by the flood of the Yellow River in Dading 8 (1168). The county was subsequently abolished, with its territory added to Jiyin.

Chinese archeologists from Mudan District excavated the ruins at Longwangmiao Village in June 2007 under the direction of Pan Jianrong (t 潘建榮, s 潘建荣, Pān Jiànróng). They established their identity as Yuanqu and examined the eastern city wall, which runs for 347 meters (1,138 ft). The walls originally stood about 9.3 meters (31 ft) high, although presently about two-thirds of the structure is underground, the soil of surrounding countryside having built up over the years.

== Notable residents ==
- Chen Xi (d. 194 BC), Han rebel
- Bian Hu (卞壺; 281–328), Eastern Jin regent
- Wen Zisheng (溫子昇; 495–547), Eastern Wei scholar
- Huang Chao (d. 884), Tang rebel

== See also ==
- Yuanqu County in Shanxi
