= Yuncheng railway station (Shandong) =

Railway station in Heze, Shandong

Yuncheng 郓城

General information
- Location: Yuncheng County, Heze, Shandong; China
- Coordinates: 35°36′7″N 115°53′42″E
- Lines: Beijing–Kowloon railway; Beijing–Shangqiu high-speed railway (under construction)

History
- Opened: 1996
Location

Yuncheng railway station (Chinese: 郓城站) is a railway station in Yuncheng County, Heze, Shandong, China. It is an intermediate stop on the Beijing–Kowloon railway and was opened in 1996. The station is also located by the local police station.

The station will be rebuilt and will become an intermediate stop on the currently under construction Beijing–Shangqiu high-speed railway.

Preceding station	China Railway	Following station
Liangshan towards Beijing West	Beijing–Kowloon railway	Heze towards Hung Hom
