= Luquan =

Luquan may refer to the following places in China:

- Luquan District (鹿泉市), Shijiazhuang, Hebei
- Luquan Yi and Miao Autonomous County (禄劝彝族苗族自治县), Kunming, Yunnan
- Luquan, Shandong (陆圈镇; zh), town in and subdivision of Dongming County, Shandong
