= Shawo Township, Shandong =

Shawo Township 沙窝乡
- Township
- Location in Shandong Shawo Township (China)
- Coordinates: 35°13′16″N 115°01′05″E
- Country: People's Republic of China
- Province: Shandong
- Prefecture-level city: Heze
- County: Dongming
- Elevation: 63 m (207 ft)
- Time zone: UTC+8 (China Standard)
- Area code: 0635

Shawo Township (simplified Chinese: 沙窝乡; traditional Chinese: 沙窩鄉; pinyin: Shāwō Xiāng) is a township of Dongming County in southwestern Shandong province, China, located 6 kilometres (3.7 mi) from the Yellow River as well as the border with Henan and served by China National Highway 106. As of 2011, it has 29 villages under its administration.

== See also ==
- List of township-level divisions of Shandong
