= Xieji, Shandong =

Xieji 谢集镇
- Town
- Location in Shandong Xieji (China)
- Coordinates: 34°50′28″N 116°01′50″E
- Country: People's Republic of China
- Province: Shandong
- Prefecture-level city: Heze
- County: Shan
- Village-level divisions: 25 villages
- Elevation: 46 m (151 ft)
- Time zone: UTC+8 (China Standard)
- Postal code: 274335
- Area code: 0530

Xieji (simplified Chinese: 谢集; traditional Chinese: 謝集; pinyin: Xièjí) is a town in Shan County in southwestern Shandong province, China, located about 7 kilometres (4.3 mi) northwest of the county seat. As of 2011, it has 25 villages under its administration.

== See also ==
- List of township-level divisions of Shandong
