= Taiqian railway station =

Railway station in Puyang, Henan

Taiqian 台前
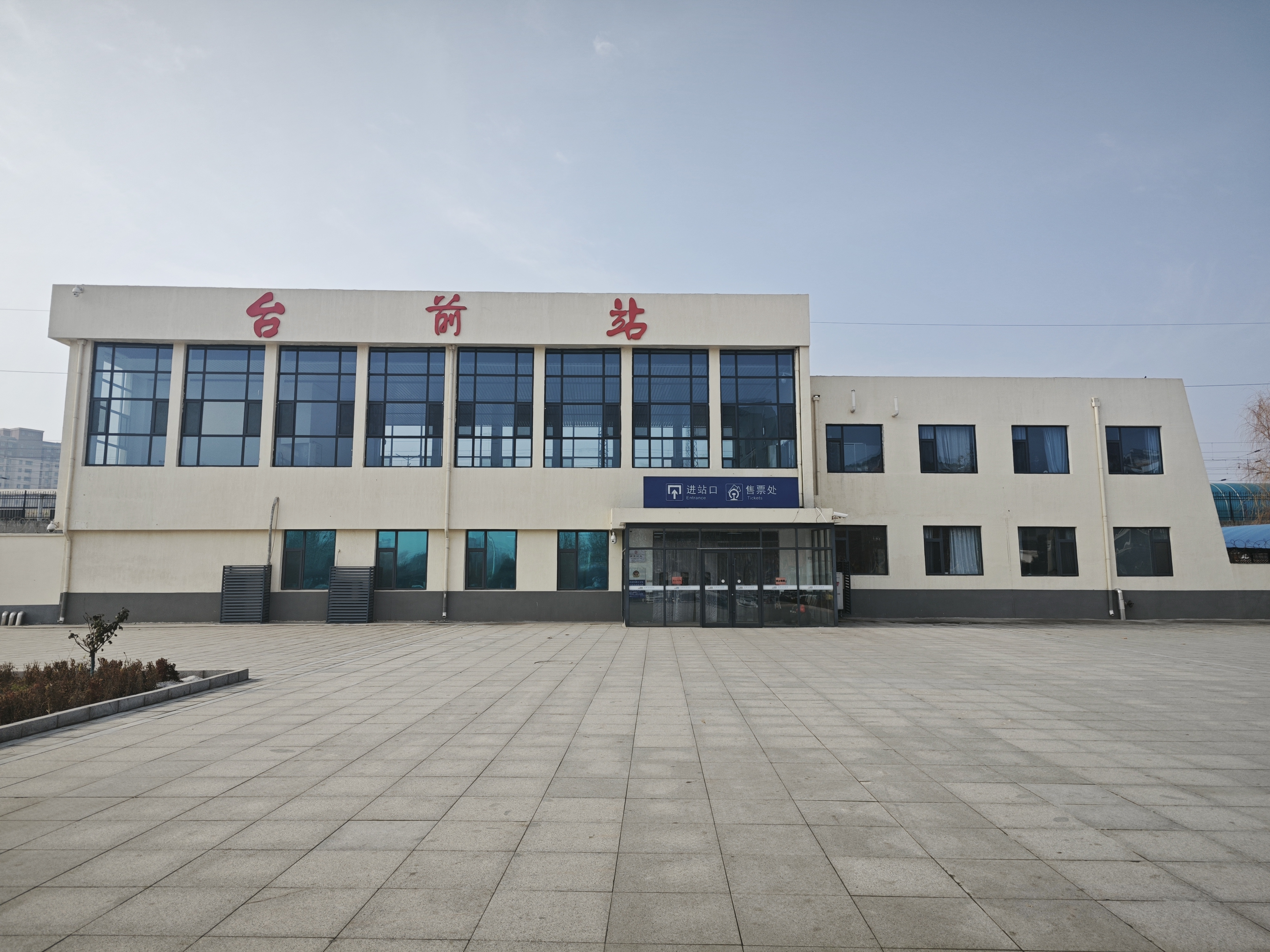
- Station building

General information
- Location: Taiqian County, Puyang, Henan; China
- Coordinates: 35°57′50″N 115°51′27″E
- Line: Beijing–Kowloon railway

History
- Opened: 1996
Location

Taiqian railway station (Chinese: 台前站) is a railway station in Taiqian County, Puyang, Henan, China. It is an intermediate stop on the Beijing–Kowloon railway. North of the station, there is a connection to the freight-only Shanxi–Henan–Shandong railway.

Preceding station	China Railway	Following station
Yanggu towards Beijing West	Beijing–Kowloon railway	Liangshan towards Hung Hom
