= Zaoyang =

Zaoyang 枣阳市 Tsaoyang
- County-level city
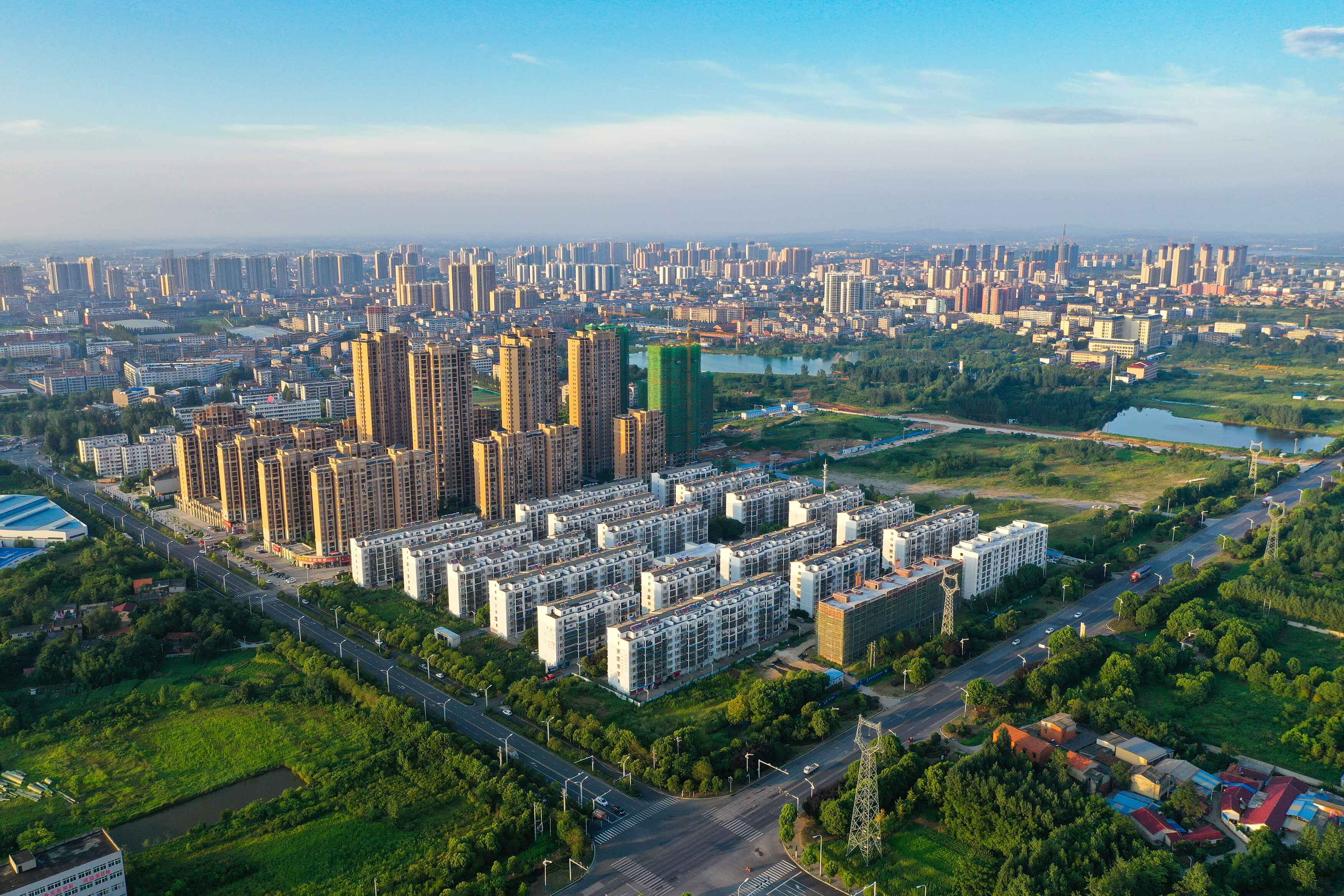

- Location in Hubei
- Coordinates (Zaoyang government): 32°07′44″N 112°46′19″E
- Country: People's Republic of China
- Province: Hubei
- Prefecture-level city: Xiangyang

Area
  - County-level city: 3,277 km^{2} (1,265 sq mi)
  - Urban: 437.80 km^{2} (169.04 sq mi)

Population (2020)
  - County-level city: 888,794
  - Density: 271.2/km^{2} (702.5/sq mi)
  - Urban: 481,004
- Time zone: UTC+8 (China Standard Time)
- Website: zyzf.gov.cn

Zaoyang (simplified Chinese: 枣阳; traditional Chinese: 棗陽; pinyin: Zǎoyáng) is a city in the north of Hubei province, People's Republic of China, bordering Henan province to the north. Administratively, it is a county-level city under the administration of Xiangyang. At the 2020 census, its population was 888,794 inhabitants.

== History ==
Remains dating back to the Warring States period (771 - 221 BCE) have been found near Zaoyang.

In 221 BCE, following the unification of China, Emperor Qin Shi Huang implemented the commandery-county system and established Caiyang County (蔡阳县) within the present-day jurisdiction of Zaoyang, under the administration of Nanyang Commandery.

In the first year of the Renshou era (601 CE), to avoid the taboo of Crown Prince Yang Guang’s name, Guangchang County (广昌县) was renamed Zaoyang County and placed under the jurisdiction of Chongling Commandery (舂陵郡).

In the 26th year of the Kaiyuan era (738 CE), Zaoyang County was divided, and Tangcheng County (present-day Tangxian Town, Suizhou) was established. From this point, the territorial boundaries of Zaoyang were largely finalized.

In the second year of the Republic of China (1913), the prefectural system (府制) was abolished, and Zaoyang County was placed directly under Hubei Province.

In the third year of the Republic of China (1914), provinces were subdivided into circuits (道), and Zaoyang was initially placed under Ebei Circuit before being reassigned to Xiangyang Circuit.

In the 16th year of the Republic of China (1927), the Nationalist Government in Nanjing abolished the circuit system, making Zaoyang County directly administered by Hubei Province.

In the 21st year of the Republic of China (1932), the provincial government established inspectorate districts (督察区), and Zaoyang County came under the jurisdiction of the Eighth Administrative Inspectorate Office of Hubei Province (present-day Xiangyang).

Zaoyang was the site of two major battles during the Second Sino-Japanese War, the Battle of Suixian-Zaoyang and the Battle of Zaoyang-Yichang.

In November 1945, the Chinese People's Liberation Army (PLA) captured Zaoyang and briefly established a county-level people's government, which was disbanded the following month due to military redeployment.

In December 1947, after the PLA recaptured Zaoyang, the county was temporarily divided along the Xianghua Highway (now National Highway 316), with the northern part designated as Zaoyang County and the southern part split into Suizao County and Xiangzaoyi County.

In October 1949, Zaoyang County was placed under the jurisdiction of the Xiangyang Administrative Office of Hubei Province.

In July 1955, following the abolition of Hongshan County, Qingtan and Pinglin were re-incorporated into Zaoyang.

In 1981, Zaoyang County came under the administration of the Xiangyang Prefectural Office.

In October 1983, under the county-administered-by-city system (市管县体制), Zaoyang County was placed under the jurisdiction of Xiangfan City.

In January 1988, the State Council of the People's Republic of China approved the change of Zaoyang from a county to a city, which continues to this day under the jurisdiction of Xiangyang City.

== Geography and climate ==
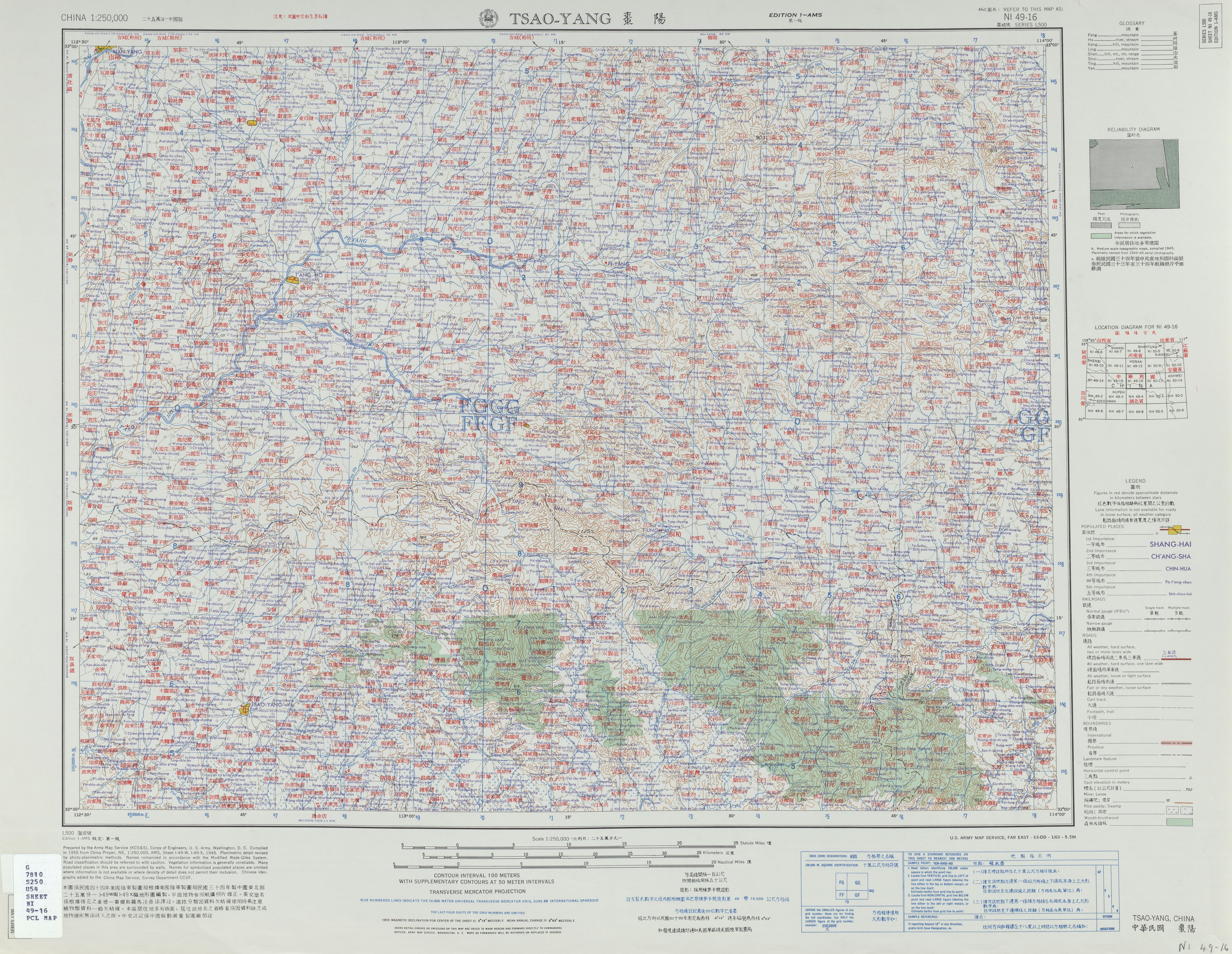
Map including Zaoyang (labeled as TSAO-YANG (walled) 棗陽) (AMS, 1955)

Zaoyang's administrative area spans in latitude 31° 40'−32° 40' N, or 78 kilometres (48 mi) and in longitude 112° 30'−113° 00' N, or 65 kilometres (40 mi).

Zaoyang has a monsoon-influenced, four season humid subtropical climate (Köppen Cwa), with cold, damp (but comparatively dry), winters, and hot, humid summers. Monthly daily averages range from 2.7 °C (36.9 °F) in January to 27.6 °C (81.7 °F) in July, with an annual mean temperature of 15.9 °C (60.6 °F). Precipitation peaks from May to August. The city receives an average 2,100 hours of sunshine per year.

Climate data for Zaoyang, elevation 126 m (413 ft), (1991–2020 normals, extremes 1959–present)
| Month | Jan | Feb | Mar | Apr | May | Jun | Jul | Aug | Sep | Oct | Nov | Dec | Year |
|---|---|---|---|---|---|---|---|---|---|---|---|---|---|
| Record high °C (°F) | 20.6 (69.1) | 25.1 (77.2) | 34.1 (93.4) | 35.6 (96.1) | 36.9 (98.4) | 38.8 (101.8) | 40.9 (105.6) | 40.8 (105.4) | 39.3 (102.7) | 33.4 (92.1) | 29.1 (84.4) | 21.0 (69.8) | 40.9 (105.6) |
| Mean daily maximum °C (°F) | 7.7 (45.9) | 11.0 (51.8) | 16.3 (61.3) | 22.8 (73.0) | 27.6 (81.7) | 31.0 (87.8) | 32.5 (90.5) | 31.7 (89.1) | 27.8 (82.0) | 22.6 (72.7) | 16.0 (60.8) | 9.9 (49.8) | 21.4 (70.5) |
| Daily mean °C (°F) | 2.9 (37.2) | 5.9 (42.6) | 10.9 (51.6) | 17.1 (62.8) | 22.2 (72.0) | 26.2 (79.2) | 28.1 (82.6) | 27.2 (81.0) | 22.9 (73.2) | 17.4 (63.3) | 11.0 (51.8) | 5.1 (41.2) | 16.4 (61.5) |
| Mean daily minimum °C (°F) | −0.5 (31.1) | 2.0 (35.6) | 6.8 (44.2) | 12.6 (54.7) | 17.7 (63.9) | 22.2 (72.0) | 24.7 (76.5) | 23.7 (74.7) | 19.2 (66.6) | 13.6 (56.5) | 7.3 (45.1) | 1.6 (34.9) | 12.6 (54.7) |
| Record low °C (°F) | −15.1 (4.8) | −9.2 (15.4) | −4.5 (23.9) | −0.5 (31.1) | 5.6 (42.1) | 12.9 (55.2) | 17.3 (63.1) | 14.6 (58.3) | 9.6 (49.3) | −0.6 (30.9) | −5.4 (22.3) | −11.6 (11.1) | −15.1 (4.8) |
| Average precipitation mm (inches) | 18.9 (0.74) | 24.9 (0.98) | 40.5 (1.59) | 64.9 (2.56) | 89.3 (3.52) | 124.5 (4.90) | 168.4 (6.63) | 115.1 (4.53) | 72.3 (2.85) | 60.2 (2.37) | 37.0 (1.46) | 15.6 (0.61) | 831.6 (32.74) |
| Average precipitation days (≥ 0.1 mm) | 5.9 | 7.2 | 8.5 | 8.9 | 10.9 | 10.2 | 11.8 | 11.3 | 9.3 | 9.3 | 7.9 | 5.8 | 107 |
| Average snowy days | 4.4 | 3.2 | 1.3 | 0 | 0 | 0 | 0 | 0 | 0 | 0 | 0.8 | 2.4 | 12.1 |
| Average relative humidity (%) | 70 | 69 | 68 | 69 | 68 | 71 | 77 | 77 | 74 | 70 | 71 | 69 | 71 |
| Mean monthly sunshine hours | 95.8 | 106.5 | 142.9 | 168.2 | 171.8 | 164.6 | 184.8 | 181.5 | 147.2 | 138.3 | 121.9 | 110.7 | 1,734.2 |
| Percentage possible sunshine | 30 | 34 | 38 | 43 | 40 | 39 | 43 | 45 | 40 | 40 | 39 | 36 | 39 |
Source 1: China Meteorological Administration all-time extreme temperature all-time January high
Source 2: Weather China

== Administrative divisions ==
Three subdistricts:

- Beicheng Subdistrict (北城街道), Nancheng Subdistrict (南城街道), Huancheng Subdistrict (环城街道)

Twelve towns:

- Juwan (琚湾镇), Qifang (七方镇), Yangdang (杨垱镇), Taiping (太平镇), Xinshi (新市镇), Lutou (鹿头镇), Liusheng (刘升镇), Xinglong (兴隆镇), Wangcheng (王城镇), Wudian (吴店镇), Xiongji (熊集镇), Pinglin (平林镇)

Other areas:

- Zaoyang Economic Zone (枣阳经济开发区), Suiyang (随阳农场), Chehe (车河农场)

== Transport ==
Zaoyang is served by the Hankou–Danjiangkou Railway.

== Notable people ==
- Emperor Guangwu of Han, creator of the Eastern Han dynasty, born in Zaoyang in 5 BCE.
- Nie Haisheng, Flight Engineer of China's 2005 Shenzhou 6 crewed spacecraft expedition, born in Zaoyang in 1964.
