= Heze railway station =

Railway station in Heze, Shandong

Heze 菏泽
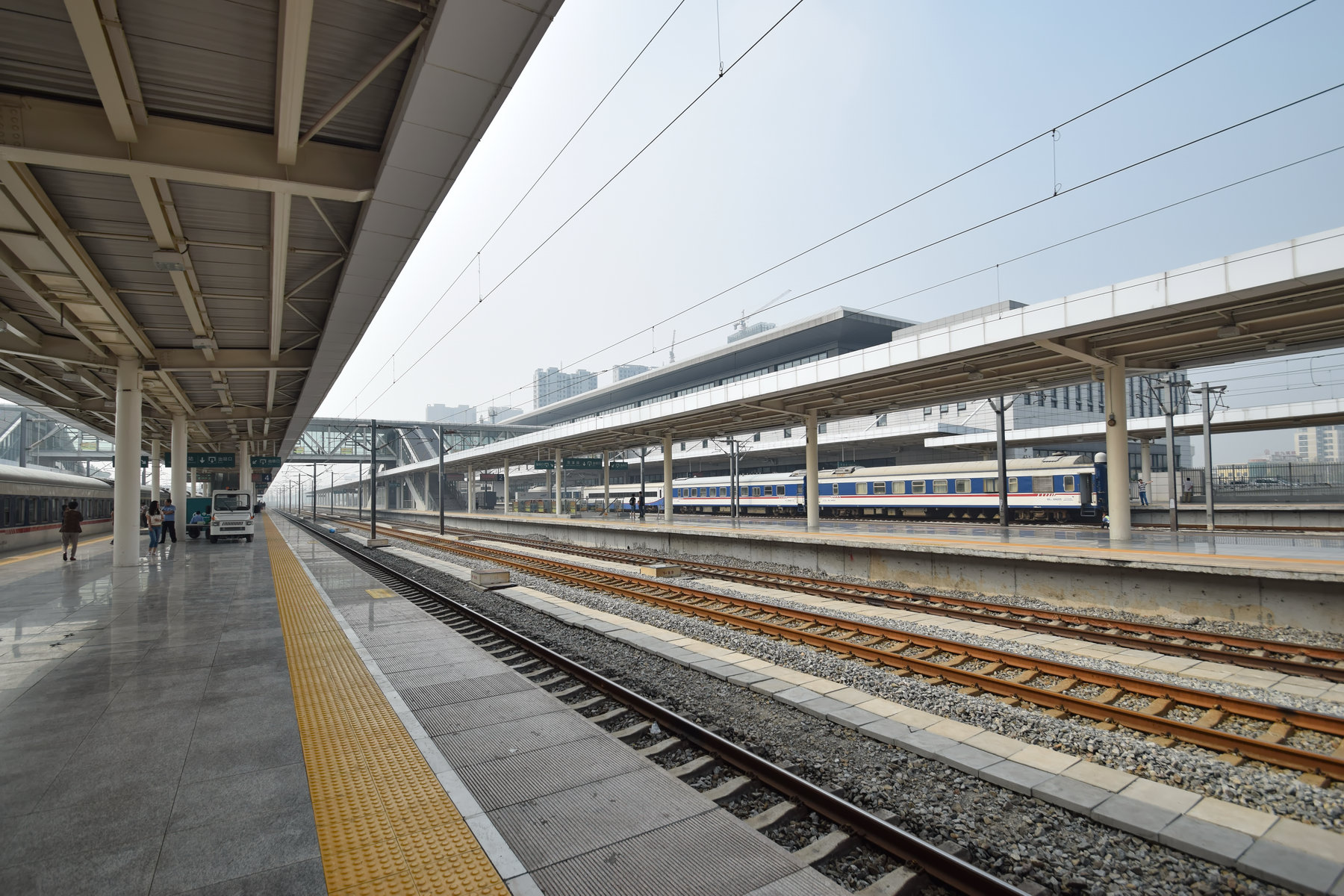

General information
- Location: Mudan District, Heze, Shandong; China
- Coordinates: 35°13′52″N 115°30′7″E
- Line(s): Beijing–Kowloon railway; Xinxiang–Yanzhou railway

History
- Opened: 1980

Heze railway station (Chinese: 菏泽站) is a railway station in Mudan District, Heze, Shandong, China. It is an intermediate station on the Beijing–Kowloon railway and the Xinxiang–Yanzhou railway.

== History ==
The station opened in 1980. From 2012 to 2014, the railway station was rebuilt and platforms raised.

== See also ==
- Heze East railway station

Preceding station	China Railway	Following station
Yuncheng towards Beijing West	Beijing–Kowloon railway	Dingtao towards Hung Hom
Dongmingxian towards Xinxiang	Xinxiang–Yanzhou railway	Juye towards Yanzhou
