= Beijing–Shangqiu high-speed railway =

High speed rail line in China

Beijing–Xiong'an–Shangqiu high-speed railway 京雄商高铁
- Shenzhou East station platform

Overview
- Status: In operation (Xiong'an - Shangqiu)
- Termini: Beijing Fengtai; Shangqiu

Service
- Operator: China Railway High-speed

History
- Opened: 28 September 2026; 52 days ago (Xiong'an - Shangqiu)

Technical
- Line length: 552.8 km (343 mi) (Xiong'an-Shangqiu section); 639 km (397 mi) (full line)
- Track gauge: 1,435 mm (4 ft 8 1/2 in)
- Operating speed: 350 km/h (217 mph)

Beijing–Xiong'an–Shangqiu high-speed railway (京雄商高铁) is a high-speed railway under construction in China. The section from Xiong'an to Shangqiu is also called Xiong'an–Shangqiu high-speed railway (雄商高铁).

== History ==
The Xiong'an to Shangqiu section had been expected to start construction in January 2021. Construction officially started on 30 September 2022. The line was opened on 28 September 2026.

The Beijing Fengtai to Xiong'an section is part of long-term planning. In short-term it will through service with the Beijing-Xiong'an intercity railway to Beijing West.

== Route ==
The route will form part of Beijing–Hong Kong (Taipei) corridor. The section between Beijing and Xiong'an will be the second to link the two cities, taking a more direct route than the existing Beijing–Xiong'an intercity railway.

== Stations ==
Station Name	Chinese	Metro transfers/connections
Beijing Fengtai	北京丰台	10 16
Daxing West (reserved)	大兴西	
Shuangxin	双辛	
Through service via Beijing–Xiong'an intercity railway to/from Beijing West
Xiong'an	雄安	
Renqiu West	任丘西	
Suning Hejian	肃宁河间	
Shenzhou East	深州东	
Hengshui South	衡水南	
Zaoqiang South	枣强南	
Qinghe West	清河西	
Linqing East	临清东	
Liaocheng West	聊城西	
Yanggu East	阳谷东	
Taiqian East	台前东	
Liangshan	梁山	
Yuncheng	郓城	
Heze East	菏泽东	
Caoxian West	曹县西	
Shangqiu	商丘	
