= Beijing Fengtai railway station =

China Railway and Beijing Subway interchange station

Beijing Fengtai 北京丰台
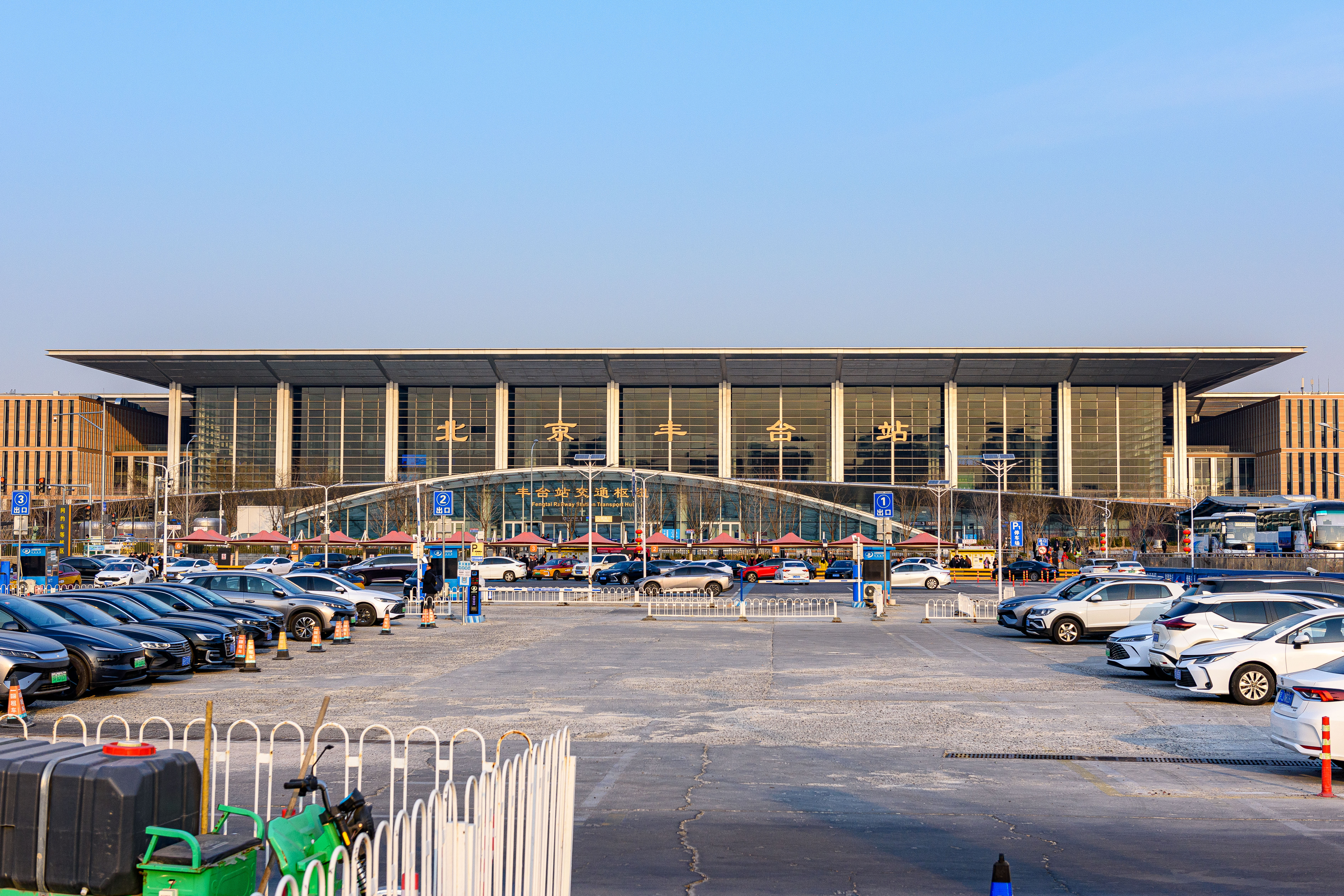
- South facade in December 2025

General information
- Other names: Fengtai (1896-2021)
- Location: Wanhua North Street / Fengfan East Road, Fengtai District, Beijing
- Coordinates: 39°50′59″N 116°17′40″E (New Railway Station); 39°50′54″N 116°17′23″E (Old Railway Station)
- Operator: China Railway Beijing Group (National Railway Station)
- Lines: Beijing–Shanghai railway Fengtai–Shacheng railway Beijing–Guangzhou high-speed railway Beijing–Guangzhou railway Beijing-Kowloon Railway; Beijing–Shangqiu high-speed railway (Planned)
- Platforms: 17
- Tracks: 32

Other information
- Station code: 10025 (TMIS); FTP (telegram); BJT (pinyin)
- Classification: Top Class station (特等站)

History
- Opened: 1896 (old railway station); 20 June 2022 (new railway station)
- Closed: 19 June 2010 (old railway station)

Services
| Preceding station | China Railway | Following station |
|---|---|---|
| Beijing South towards Beijing | Beijing–Shanghai railway | Huangcun towards Shanghai |
Location

Beijing Fengtai railway station (Chinese: 北京丰台站; pinyin: Běijīng Fēngtái zhàn) is a railway station located in the Fengtai District of Beijing. It was renamed from Fengtai railway station to Beijing Fengtai railway station in 2021. The new railway station opened on 20 June 2022.

The new railway station is served by both high-speed and conventional-speed railways, including Beijing–Guangzhou high-speed railway, Beijing–Guangzhou railway. The station is the largest in Asia, with departure lounges, restaurants and other amenities spread across 400,000 square meters. At its peak, the station will be able to host 14,000 passengers per hour on a mix of bullet and regular trains as well as subway lines.

== History ==
Construction on the original station began in 1895, and it was opened in 1896. Passenger services ceased on 19 June 2010. The station was closed in June 2010 in preparation for the construction of the new Fengtai railway station.

A metro station on Line 10 of the Beijing Subway was opened on 5 May 2013.

The construction of the new station was officially started in mid 2018 and the new railway station was expected to open in 2020 for conventional-speed railway, and in 2021 for high-speed railway. The opening of the new station was delayed until 20 June 2022 when it opened for both conventional-speed and high-speed railway.

== Layout ==
=== China Railway ===
The station has 12 platforms for high-speed trains (consisting of 6 islands) directly above 20 platforms for conventional services (consisting of 9 islands and 2 side platforms).

=== Beijing Subway ===
Fengtai Railway Station 丰台站
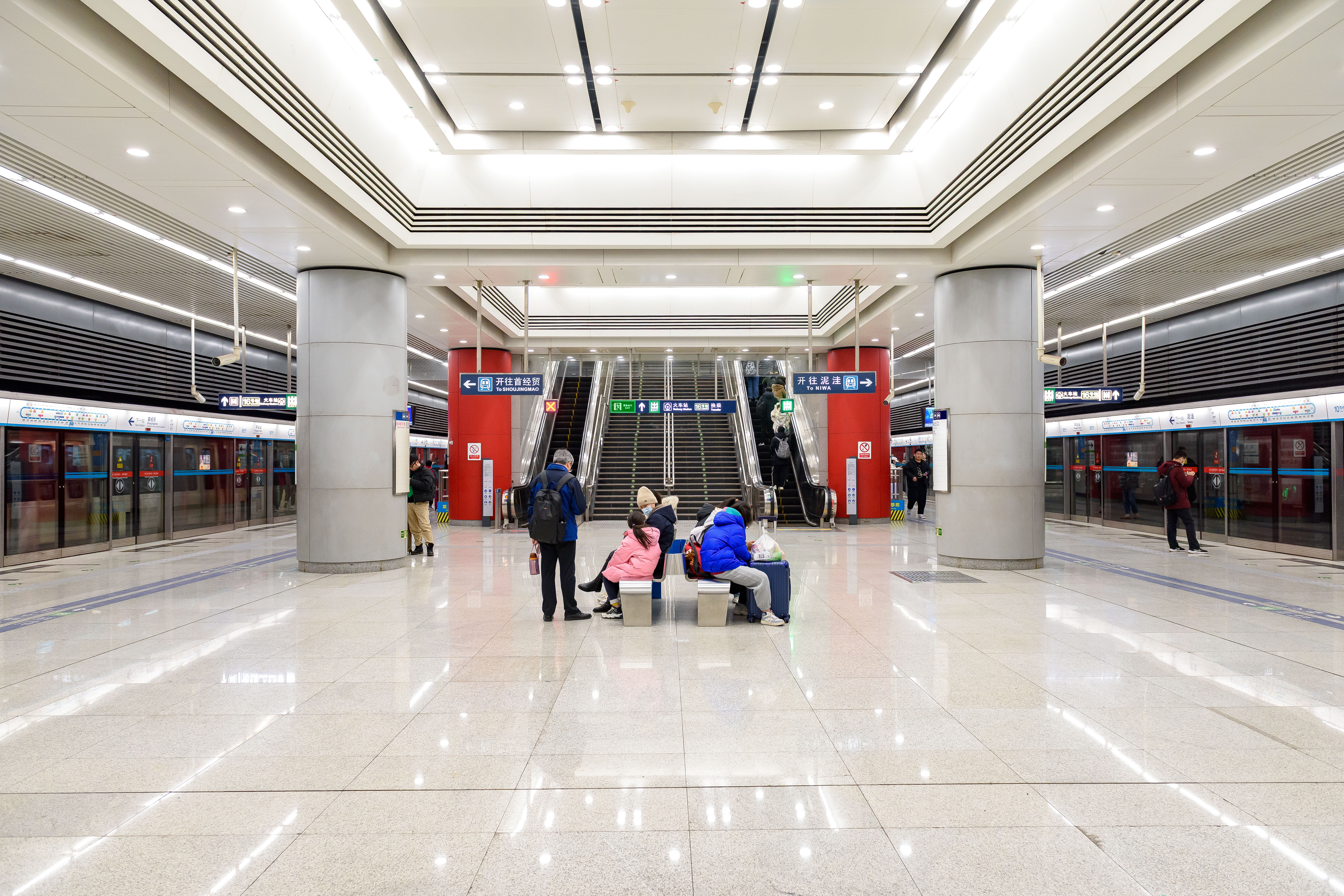
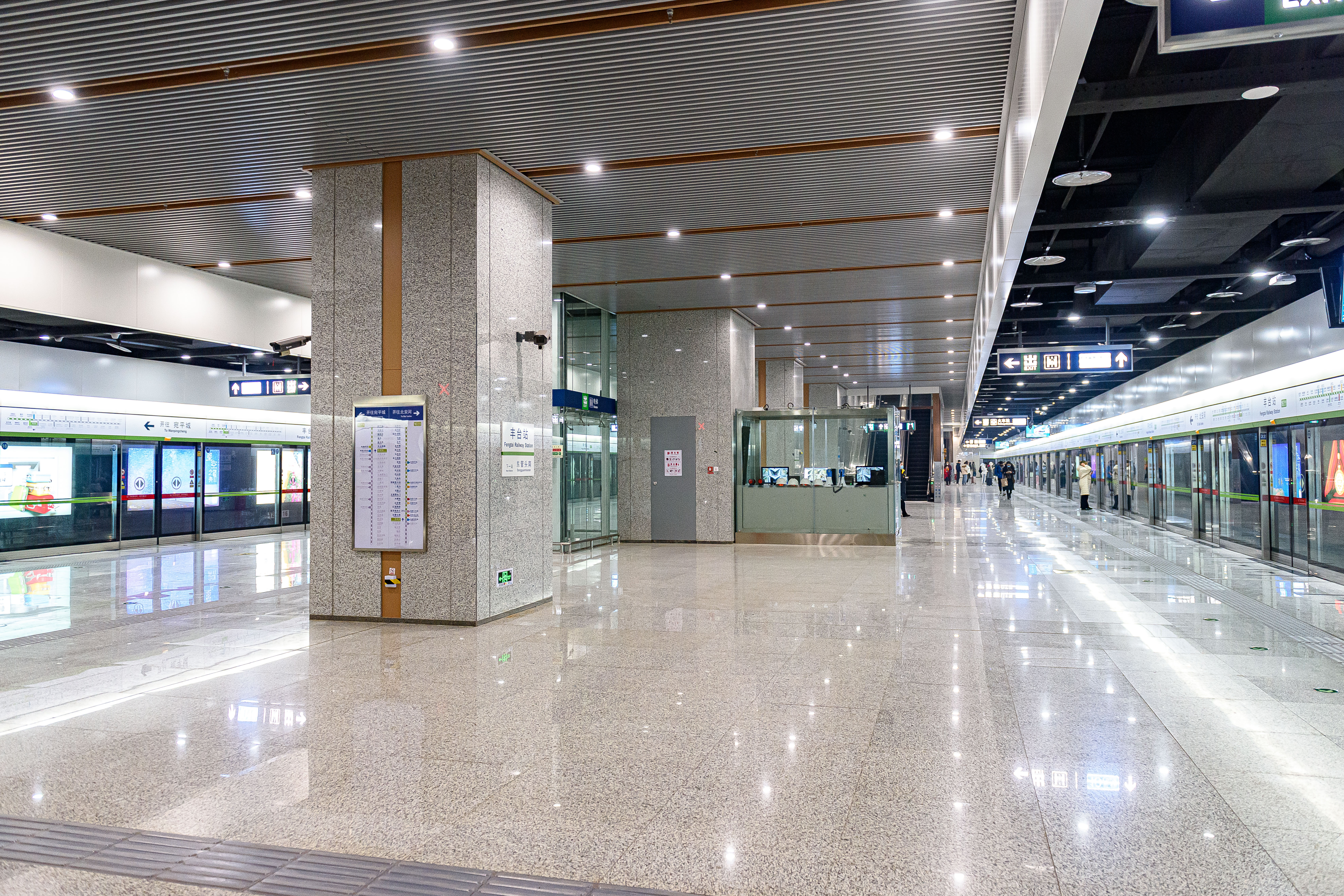
- Line 10 platform Line 16 platform

General information
- Location: Fengtai District, Beijing; China
- Coordinates: 39°50′59″N 116°18′16″E (Line 10 station)
- Operator: Beijing Mass Transit Railway Operation Corp., Ltd (Line 10); MTR Beijing (Line 16)
- Lines: Line 10; Line 16
- Platforms: 4 (2 island platforms)
- Tracks: 4

Construction
- Structure type: Underground
- Accessible: Yes

History
- Opened: Line 10: May 5, 2013; 13 years ago; Line 16: December 31, 2022; 3 years ago

Services
| Preceding station | Beijing Subway | Following station |
|---|---|---|
| Capital Univ. of Economics & Business outer loop / anticlockwise | Line 10 | Niwa inner loop / clockwise |
| Dongguantounan towards Bei'anhe | Line 16 | Fengtai Nanlu towards Wanpingcheng |
Location
- Location within Beijing

Fengtai railway station is served by Line 10 and Line 16 of the Beijing Subway. Both the line 10 and line 16 stations have underground island platforms. The station has 3 exits, lettered C1, C2, and D. Exit C1 is accessible via an elevator.

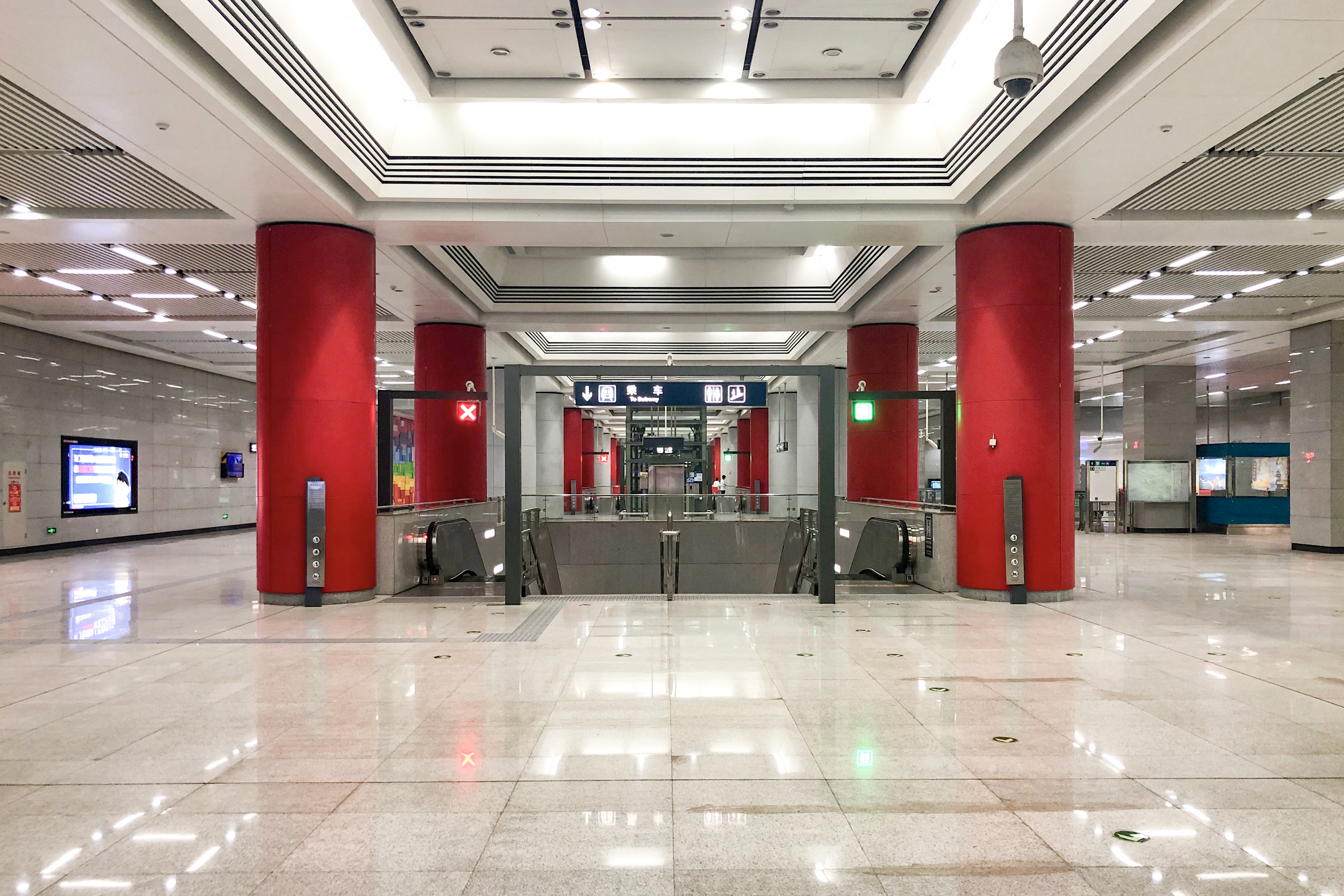
Line 10 concourse (June 2020)

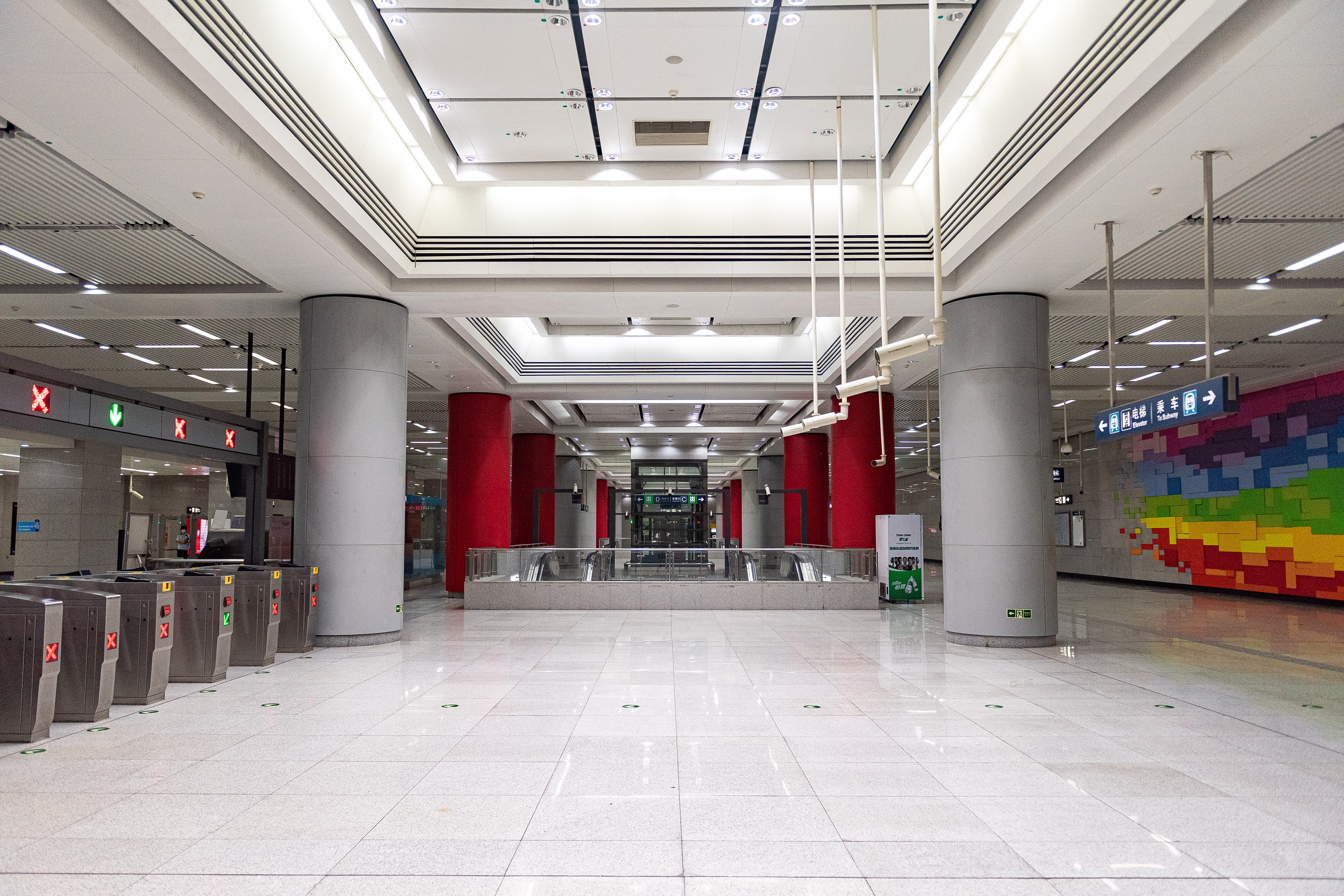
Line 10 concourse (September 2021)

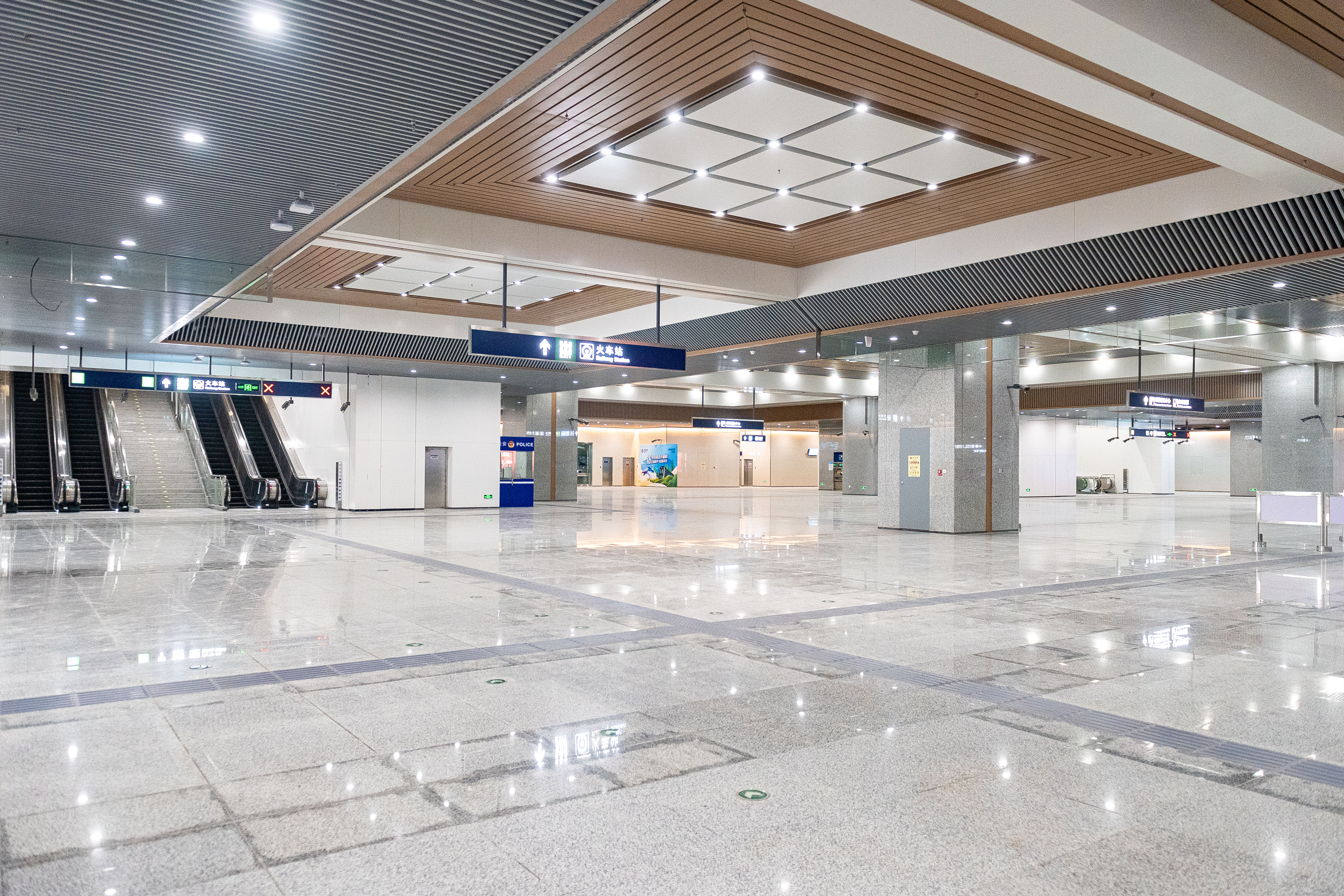
Line 16 non-paid area concourse (December 2022, not yet in service)

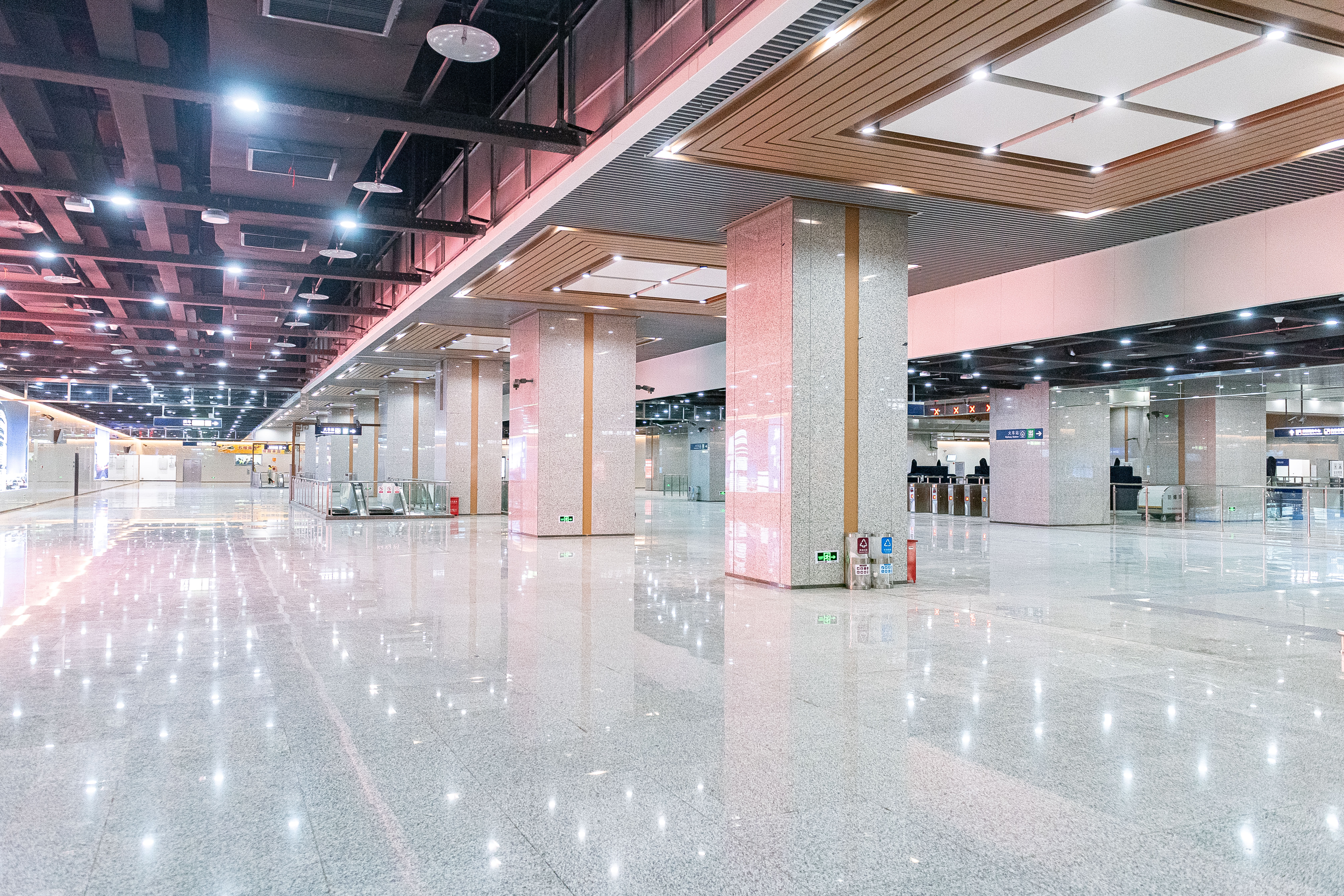
Line 16 paid area concourse (December 2022)
