= Heze East railway station =

Railway station in Heze, Shandong, China

Heze East 菏泽东
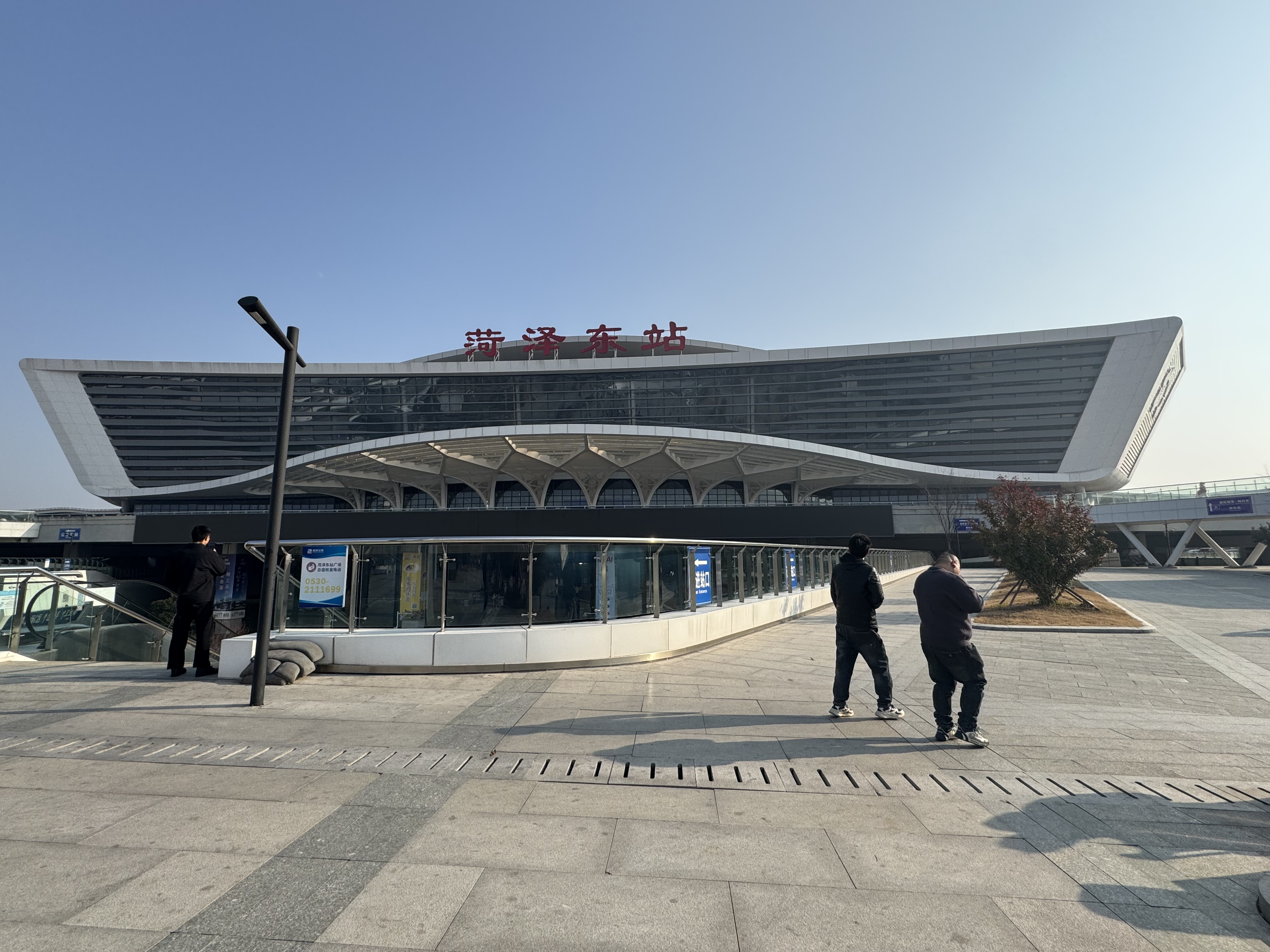
- Heze East Railway Station, December 2025

General information
- Location: Dingtao District, Heze, Shandong; China
- Lines: Rizhao–Lankao high-speed railway; Beijing–Shangqiu high-speed railway (under construction)
- Platforms: 11

History
- Opened: 26 December 2021
Location

Heze East railway station (Chinese: 菏泽东站) is a railway station located in Heze, Shandong, China. It will have 11 platforms and be an interchange between the Beijing–Shangqiu high-speed railway and the Rizhao–Lankao high-speed railway. It opened on 26 December 2021.

== See also ==
- Heze railway station
