= Xinshi, Zaoyang =

Xinshi 新市镇
- Town
- Location in Hubei
- Coordinates: 32°19′53″N 112°58′24″E
- Country: People's Republic of China
- Province: Hubei
- Prefecture-level city: Xiangyang
- County-level city: Zaoyang
- Village-level divisions: 2 residential communities 39 villages
- Elevation: 190 m (620 ft)

Population (2010)
  - Total: 48,362
- Time zone: UTC+8 (China Standard)
- Area code: 0710

Xinshi (Chinese: 新市; pinyin: Xīnshì; lit. 'new city') is a town under the administration of Zaoyang City in the western slopes of the Dabie Mountains of Hubei, People's Republic of China, located 4.1 kilometres (2.5 mi) south of the border with Henan and 30 km (19 mi) northeast of downtown Zaoyang City. As of 2011, it has two residential communities (居委会) and 39 villages under its administration.

== Administrative divisions ==
Communities:

- Xinshi (新市居委会), Qiangang (钱岗居委会)

Villages:

- Xinyi (新一村), Qianjing (前井村), Lilou (李楼村), Hongyanhe (鸿雁河村), Dayan (大堰村), Luolou (骆楼村), Dongliwan (东李湾村), Xiepeng (谢棚村), Zhaozhuang (赵庄村), Zhangxiang (张巷村), Xiaozhuang (肖庄村), Luohebei (洛河北村), Huangwan (黄湾村), Pengzhuang (彭庄村), Huoqing (火青村), Xingchuan (邢川村), Zhoulou (周楼村), Qianwan (前湾村), Zhengjiawan (郑家湾村), Fujiawan (付家湾村), Mengziping (孟子坪村), Tanghe (汤河村), Xinji (新集村), Luozhuang (骆庄村), Qiangangyi (钱岗一村), Qiangang'er (钱岗二村), Wanglaozhuang (王老庄村), Qiandang (钱当村), Xionggang (熊岗村), Wangdaqiao (王大桥村), Xiliwang (西李湾村), Gaoya (高庄村), Shantouli (山头里村), Dengpeng (邓棚村), Yaopeng (姚棚村), Bailu (白露村), Yangzhuang (杨庄村), Rengang (任岗村), Quangou (泉沟村)

== See also ==
- List of township-level divisions of Hubei
