= Shan County =

Shan County 单县
- County
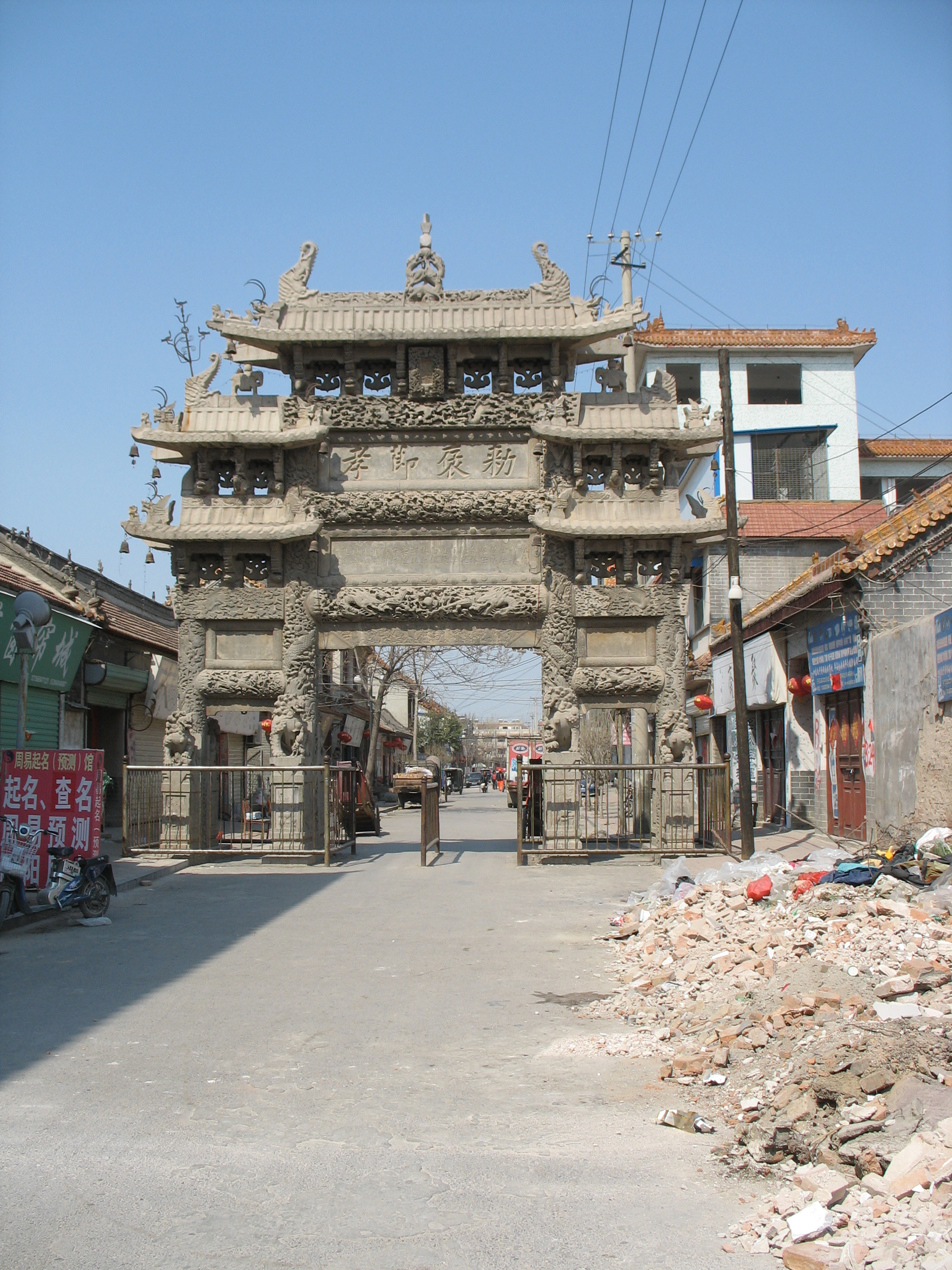

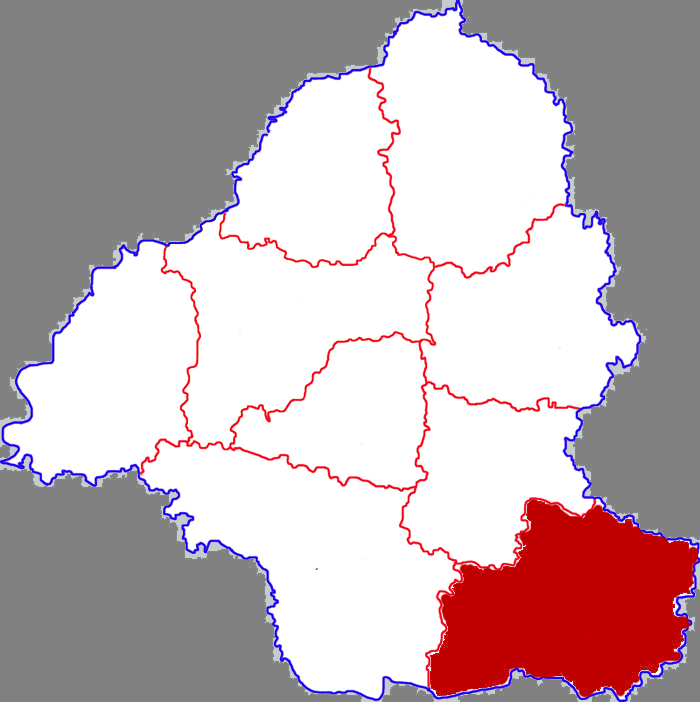
- Shan County in Heze

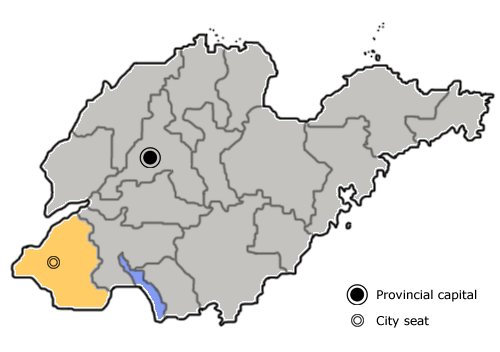
- Heze in Shandong
- Coordinates: 34°46′47″N 116°06′23″E
- Country: People's Republic of China
- Province: Shandong
- Prefecture-level city: Heze

Area
  - Total: 1,670 km^{2} (640 sq mi)

Population (2019)
  - Total: 1,097,600
  - Density: 657/km^{2} (1,700/sq mi)
- Time zone: UTC+8 (China Standard)
- Postal code: 274300

Shan County or Shanxian (simplified Chinese: 单县; traditional Chinese: 單縣; pinyin: Shàn Xiàn) is a county in the southwest of Shandong province, China, bordering the provinces of Anhui to the southeast and Henan to the southwest. It is under the administration of the prefecture-level city of Heze.

== Administrative divisions ==
As of 2012, this County is divided to 4 subdistricts, 5 towns and 2 townships.

Subdistricts

- Beicheng Subdistrict (北城街道)
- Nancheng Subdistrict (南城街道)
- Yuanyi Subdistrict (园艺街道)
- Dongcheng Subdistrict (东城街道)

Towns

- Guocun (郭村镇)
- Huanggang (黄岗镇)
- Zhongxing (终兴镇)
- Gaoweizhuang (高韦庄镇)
- Xuzhai (徐寨镇)
- Caitang (蔡堂镇)
- Zhuji (朱集镇)
- Lixinzhuang (李新庄镇)
- Fugang (浮岗镇)
- Laihe (莱河镇)
- Shilou (时楼镇)
- Yanglou (杨楼镇)
- Zhangji (张集镇)
- Longwangmiao (龙王庙镇)
- Litianlou (李田楼镇)
- Xieji (谢集镇)

Townships

- Gaolaojia Township (高老家乡)
- Caozhuang Township (曹庄乡)

== Climate ==
Climate data for Shanxian, elevation 46 m (151 ft), (1991–2020 normals, extremes 1981–2010)
| Month | Jan | Feb | Mar | Apr | May | Jun | Jul | Aug | Sep | Oct | Nov | Dec | Year |
|---|---|---|---|---|---|---|---|---|---|---|---|---|---|
| Record high °C (°F) | 16.9 (62.4) | 25.9 (78.6) | 28.8 (83.8) | 33.2 (91.8) | 36.8 (98.2) | 40.5 (104.9) | 40.2 (104.4) | 37.0 (98.6) | 36.6 (97.9) | 35.3 (95.5) | 27.5 (81.5) | 21.0 (69.8) | 40.5 (104.9) |
| Mean daily maximum °C (°F) | 5.1 (41.2) | 9.1 (48.4) | 15.1 (59.2) | 21.7 (71.1) | 26.9 (80.4) | 31.4 (88.5) | 32.1 (89.8) | 30.8 (87.4) | 27.1 (80.8) | 21.9 (71.4) | 14.0 (57.2) | 7.2 (45.0) | 20.2 (68.4) |
| Daily mean °C (°F) | 0.4 (32.7) | 3.8 (38.8) | 9.5 (49.1) | 15.9 (60.6) | 21.3 (70.3) | 25.9 (78.6) | 27.5 (81.5) | 26.2 (79.2) | 21.7 (71.1) | 15.8 (60.4) | 8.6 (47.5) | 2.3 (36.1) | 14.9 (58.8) |
| Mean daily minimum °C (°F) | −3.2 (26.2) | −0.1 (31.8) | 4.9 (40.8) | 10.8 (51.4) | 16.2 (61.2) | 21.0 (69.8) | 23.9 (75.0) | 22.8 (73.0) | 17.7 (63.9) | 11.4 (52.5) | 4.5 (40.1) | −1.2 (29.8) | 10.7 (51.3) |
| Record low °C (°F) | −15.3 (4.5) | −12.4 (9.7) | −7.4 (18.7) | −1.6 (29.1) | 4.2 (39.6) | 11.8 (53.2) | 17.3 (63.1) | 12.0 (53.6) | 5.9 (42.6) | −2.0 (28.4) | −11.4 (11.5) | −14.3 (6.3) | −15.3 (4.5) |
| Average precipitation mm (inches) | 11.7 (0.46) | 18.1 (0.71) | 22.8 (0.90) | 38.0 (1.50) | 53.9 (2.12) | 78.8 (3.10) | 182.6 (7.19) | 159.4 (6.28) | 74.6 (2.94) | 34.9 (1.37) | 32.8 (1.29) | 12.7 (0.50) | 720.3 (28.36) |
| Average precipitation days (≥ 0.1 mm) | 3.7 | 4.4 | 4.7 | 5.7 | 6.6 | 7.5 | 11.8 | 10.6 | 8.1 | 6.0 | 5.2 | 3.9 | 78.2 |
| Average snowy days | 3.3 | 2.5 | 0.6 | 0.2 | 0 | 0 | 0 | 0 | 0 | 0 | 0.8 | 1.8 | 9.2 |
| Average relative humidity (%) | 66 | 62 | 58 | 63 | 66 | 67 | 80 | 83 | 78 | 73 | 70 | 67 | 69 |
| Mean monthly sunshine hours | 133.8 | 141.8 | 184.8 | 208.3 | 229.9 | 207.8 | 186.3 | 180.4 | 172.5 | 171.8 | 150.3 | 142.8 | 2,110.5 |
| Percentage possible sunshine | 43 | 46 | 50 | 53 | 53 | 48 | 43 | 44 | 47 | 50 | 49 | 47 | 48 |
Source: China Meteorological Administration
