= Liangshan railway station =

Railway station in Jining, Shandong

Liangshan 梁山
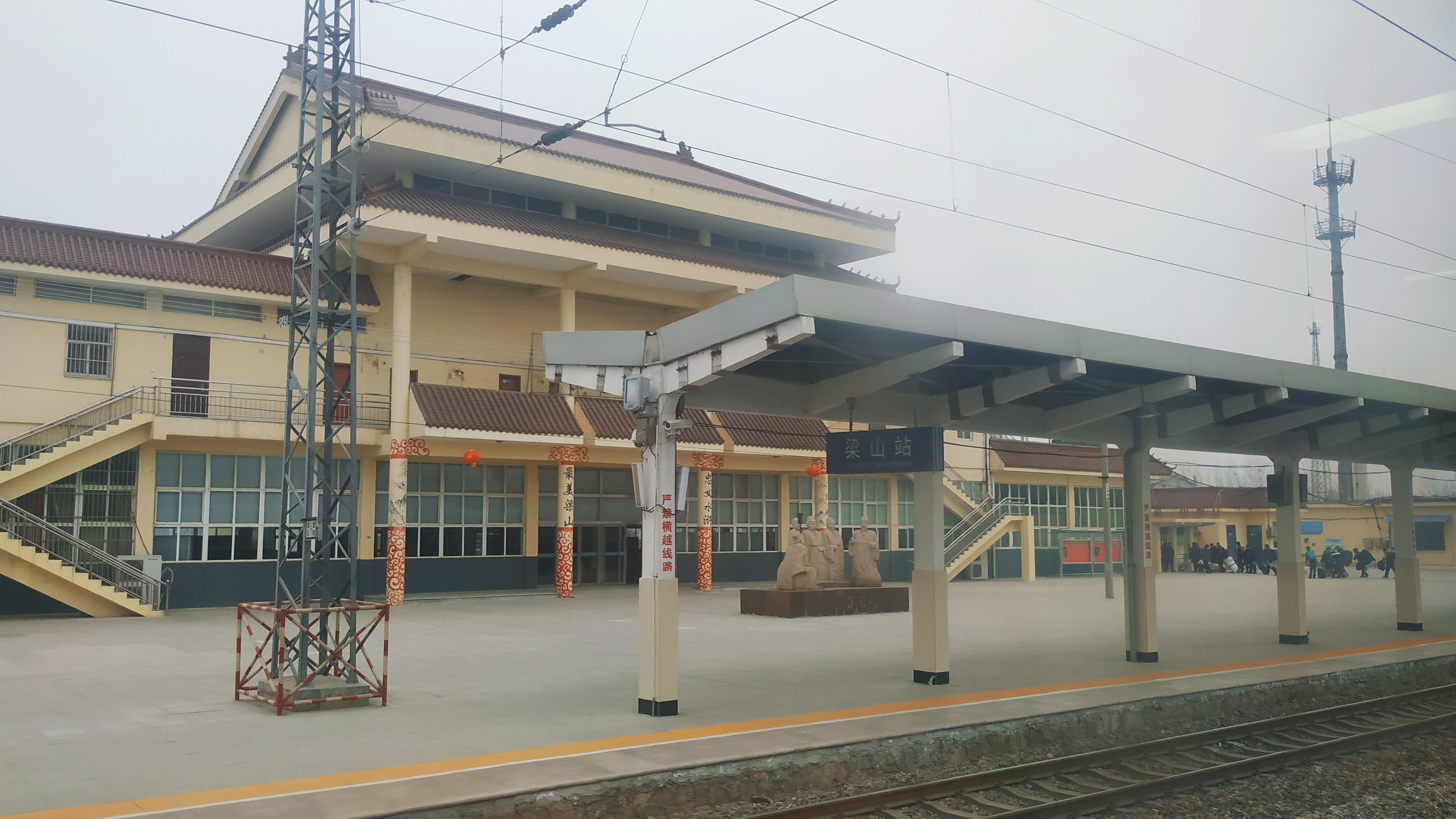

General information
- Location: Liangshan County, Jining, Shandong; China
- Coordinates: 35°49′7″N 115°55′52″E
- Line: Beijing–Kowloon railway
Location

Liangshan railway station (Chinese: 梁山站) is a railway station in Liangshan County, Jining, Shandong, China. It is an intermediate stop on the Beijing–Kowloon railway.

The station will be rebuilt and will become an intermediate stop on the currently under construction Beijing–Shangqiu high-speed railway.

| Preceding station | China Railway | Following station |
|---|---|---|
| Taiqian towards Beijing West | Beijing–Kowloon railway | Yuncheng towards Hung Hom |
