= Mudan, Heze =

Mudan 牡丹区
- District
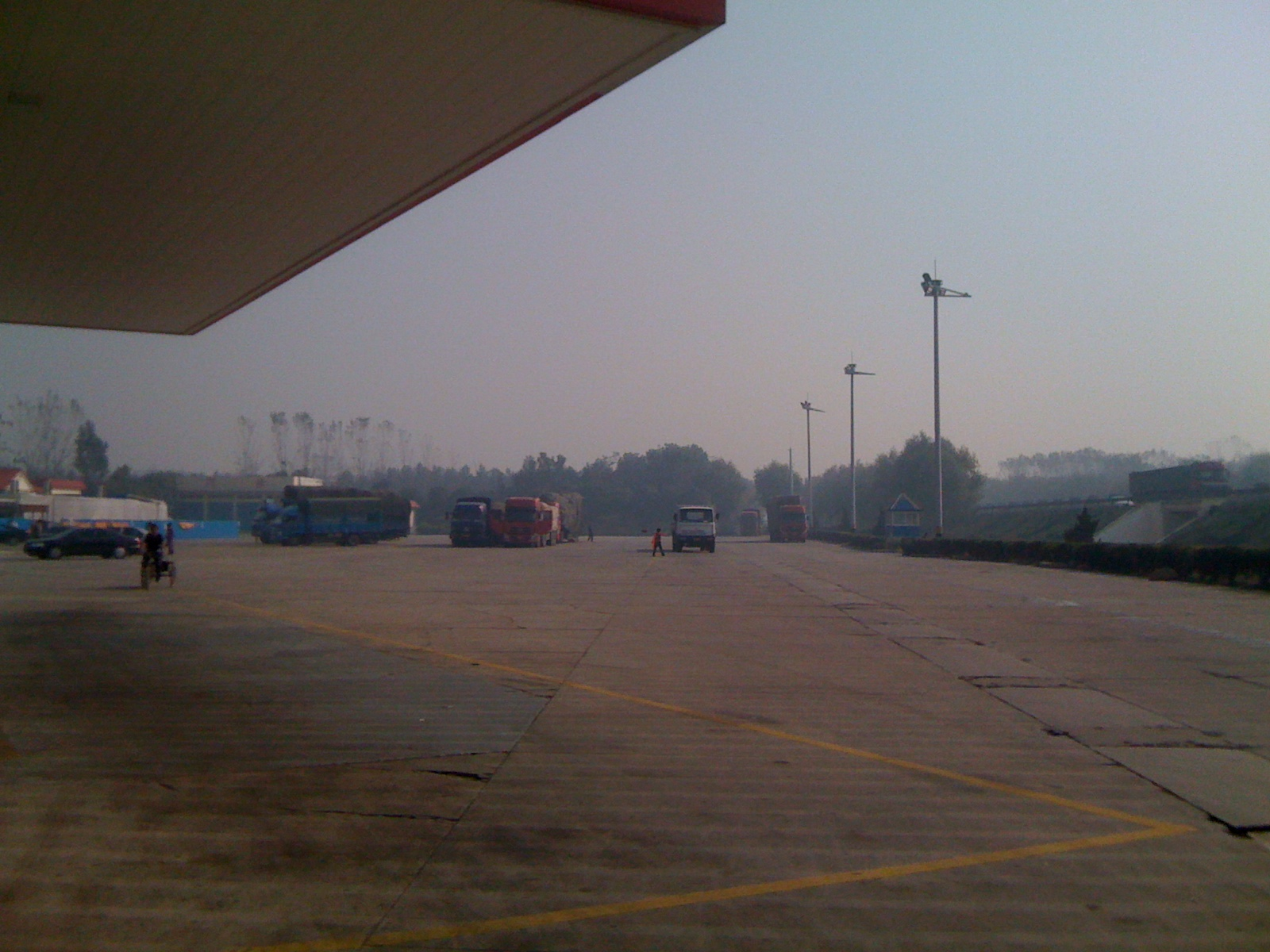

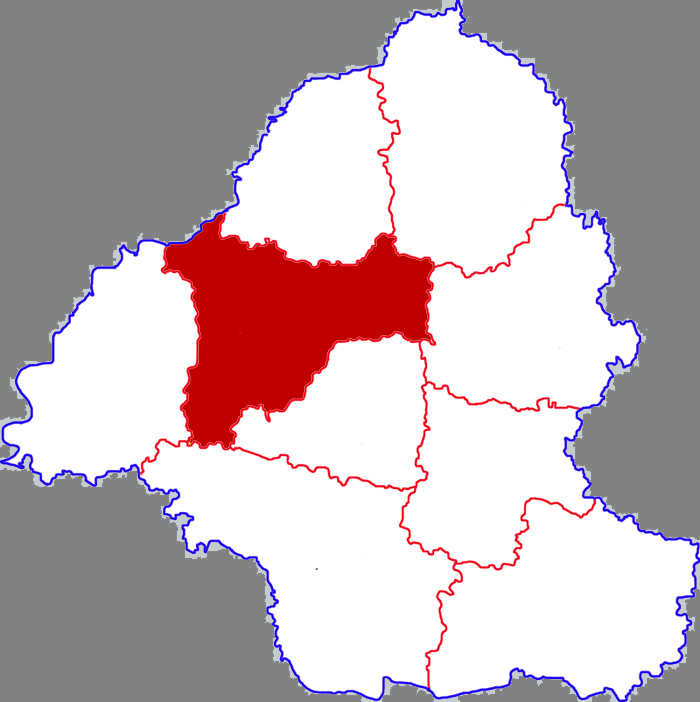
- Mudan in Heze

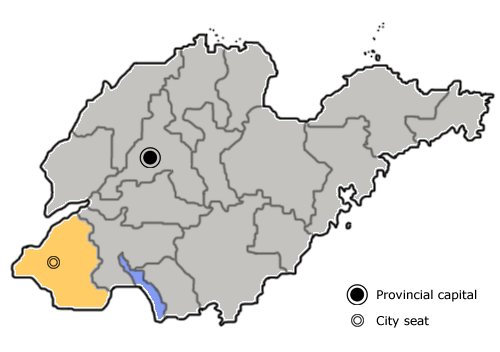
- Heze in Shandong
- Coordinates: 35°15′09″N 115°25′04″E
- Country: People's Republic of China
- Province: Shandong
- Prefecture-level city: Heze

Area
  - Total: 1,415 km^{2} (546 sq mi)

Population (2019)
  - Total: 1,020,600
  - Density: 721.3/km^{2} (1,868/sq mi)
- Time zone: UTC+8 (China Standard)
- Postal code: 274009

Mudan, Heze
- Traditional Chinese: 牡丹區
- Simplified Chinese: 牡丹区
- Literal meaning: Peony District
Transcriptions
Standard Mandarin
- Hanyu Pinyin: Mǔdān qū
- Wade–Giles: Mu-tan Ch‘ü

Mudan District is an urban district of Heze, Shandong province. It is the seat of Heze's prefectural government and center of its built-up or metro area, bordering Henan province to the northwest across the Yellow River.

== History ==
Southwest Mudan District was the site of the ancient and medieval town of Yuanqu, which was the seat of an eponymous county.

== Administrative divisions ==
As of 2012, this district is divided to 10 subdistricts, 12 towns and 2 townships.

Subdistricts

- Dongcheng Subdistrict (东城街道)
- Xicheng Subdistrict (西城街道)
- Nancheng Subdistrict (南城街道)
- Beicheng Subdistrict (北城街道)
- Mudan Subdistrict (牡丹街道)
- Danyang Subdistrict (丹阳街道)
- Yuecheng Subdistrict (岳程街道)
- Dianhutun Subdistrict (佃户屯街道)
- Helou Subdistrict (何楼街道)
- Wanfu Subdistrict (万福街道)

Towns

- Shatu (沙土镇)
- Wudian (吴店镇)
- Wangjietun (王浩屯镇)
- Huanggang (黄堽镇)
- Dusi (都司镇)
- Gaozhuang (高庄镇)
- Xiaoliu (小留镇)
- Licun (李村镇)
- Malinggang (马岭岗镇)
- Anxing (安兴镇)
- Dahuangji (大黄集镇)
- Lüling (吕陵镇)

Townships

- Huji Township (胡集乡)
- Huangzhen Township (皇镇乡)

== Transportation ==
- Heze railway station
