= Shatu, Shandong =

Shatu 沙土镇
- Town
- Location in Shandong Shatu (China)
- Coordinates: 35°16′25″N 115°44′17″E
- Country: People's Republic of China
- Province: Shandong
- Prefecture-level city: Heze
- District: Mudan
- Elevation: 50 m (160 ft)
- Time zone: UTC+8 (China Standard)
- Postal code: 274900
- Area code: 0530

Shatu (Chinese: 沙土; pinyin: Shātǔ; lit. 'sandy soil') is a town in Mudan District, Heze, Shandong, People's Republic of China, situated on China National Highway 327 more than 20 kilometres (12 mi) east of downtown Heze. As of 2011, it has 40 villages under its administration.

== See also ==
- List of township-level divisions of Shandong
