= Wudian, Shandong =

Wudian 吴店镇
- Town
- Location in Shandong Wudian (China)
- Coordinates: 35°19′28″N 115°23′20″E
- Country: People's Republic of China
- Province: Shandong
- Prefecture-level city: Heze
- District: Mudan
- Elevation: 50 m (160 ft)
- Time zone: UTC+8 (China Standard)
- Area code: 0530

Wudian (simplified Chinese: 吴店; traditional Chinese: 吳店; pinyin: Wúdiàn) is a town in Mudan District, in the northwestern suburbs of Heze, Shandong, People's Republic of China, located 8 kilometres (5.0 mi) from downtown Heze. As of 2011, it has one residential community (社区) and 37 villages under its administration.

== See also ==
- List of township-level divisions of Shandong
