= Wudian, Zaoyang =

Wudian 吴店镇
- Town
- Location in Hubei
- Coordinates: 31°59′02″N 112°46′13″E
- Country: People's Republic of China
- Province: Hubei
- Prefecture-level city: Xiangyang
- County-level city: Zaoyang
- Elevation: 107 m (351 ft)

Population (2010)
  - Total: 80,714
- Time zone: UTC+8 (China Standard)

Wudian (simplified Chinese: 吴店; traditional Chinese: 吳店; pinyin: Wúdiàn) is a town under the administration of Zaoyang City in northern Hubei province, China, located 15 kilometres (9.3 mi) south of downtown Zaoyang and just south of G70 Fuzhou–Yinchuan Expressway. As of 2011, it has 2 residential communities (社区) and 44 villages under its administration.

== Administrative divisions ==
Communities:

- Zhongxin (中心社区), Qingtan (清潭社区)

Villages:

- Xinzhuang (新庄村), Chunling (春陵村), Yaogang (姚岗村), Xizhaohu (西赵湖村), Shengmiao (圣庙村), Erlang (二郎村), Xiaowan (肖湾村), Zhouzhai (周寨村), Huangmiao (黄庙村), Dongzhaohu (东赵湖村), Shutou (树头村), Gunhe (滚河村), Lizhai (李寨村), Tongxin (同心村), Huangcun (皇村村), Shilou (施楼村), Wukou (五口村), Shenfan (沈畈村), Baima (白马村), Gaofeng (高峰村), Dazi (达子村), Xulou (徐楼村), Baishui (白水村), Tiantai (田台村), Liangshui (凉水村), Tangwan (唐湾村), Chaijiamiao (柴家庙村), Dongchong (东冲村), Jiangfan (蒋畈村), Yuzui (喻咀村), Shuangcaomen (双槽门村), Sanligang (三里岗村), Xuzhai (徐寨村), Chengwan (程湾村), Shuangwan (双湾村), Jingwan (井湾村), Qiganwan (旗杆湾村), Changligang (长里岗村), Dayanjiao (大堰角村), Yuhuangmiao (玉皇庙村), Hewan (何湾村), Huawuji (花屋脊村), Shici (史祠村), Yufan (余畈村)

== See also ==
- List of township-level divisions of Hubei
