= Dongming County =

Dongming County 东明县 Tungming
- County
- Location of the seat in Shandong
- Coordinates: 35°17′N 115°05′E
- Country: People's Republic of China
- Province: Shandong
- Prefecture-level city: Heze

Area
  - Total: 1,370 km^{2} (530 sq mi)
- Elevation: 60 m (200 ft)

Population (2019)
  - Total: 748,600
  - Density: 546/km^{2} (1,420/sq mi)
- Time zone: UTC+8 (China Standard)
- Postal Code: 274500
- Website: www.dmzf.gov.cn

Dongming County
- Traditional Chinese: 東明縣
- Simplified Chinese: 东明县
- Literal meaning: eastern brightness
Transcriptions
Standard Mandarin
- Hanyu Pinyin: Dōngmíng Xiàn
- Wade–Giles: Tung-ming Hsien

Dongming County in Heze Prefecture is the westernmost county of Shandong Province in the People's Republic of China. It borders Henan Province to the west across the Yellow River. Dongming County had a population of 677,563 in 1999.

== History ==
Most of Dongming County formerly formed part of Yuanqu County, which was abolished in the 12th century after a Yellow River flood destroyed its county seat. In the early 20th century, the county was part of Zhili. Later, the area came under the jurisdiction of Henan. From April 1963, the county became part of Shandong. Within Yuanqu County, the town of Zhuzao (煮栆城, Zhǔzǎochéng) was located within present-day Dongming County.

== Administrative divisions ==
Dongming County includes seven towns, six townships, one provincial economic and technical development zone, and 389 administrative villages.

Towns

- Chengguan (城关镇)
- Dongmingji (东明集镇)
- Liulou (刘楼镇)
- Luquan (陆圈镇)
- Matou (马头镇)
- Sanchunji (三春集镇)
- Datun (大屯镇)

Townships

- Wushengqiao Township (武胜桥乡)
- Caiyuanji Township (菜园集乡)
- Xiaojing Township (小井乡)
- Shawo Township (沙窝乡)
- Changxingji Township (长兴集乡)
- Jiaoyuan Township (焦园乡)

== Demographics ==
The population in 1999 was 677,563.

== Climate ==
Climate data for Dongming, elevation 57 m (187 ft), (1991–2020 normals, extremes 1981–present)
Month	Jan	Feb	Mar	Apr	May	Jun	Jul	Aug	Sep	Oct	Nov	Dec	Year
Record high °C (°F)	19.8 (67.6)	24.1 (75.4)	27.8 (82.0)	34.2 (93.6)	38.3 (100.9)	40.9 (105.6)	41.6 (106.9)	36.8 (98.2)	36.6 (97.9)	34.4 (93.9)	27.7 (81.9)	21.1 (70.0)	41.6 (106.9)
Mean daily maximum °C (°F)	4.7 (40.5)	8.8 (47.8)	14.9 (58.8)	21.3 (70.3)	26.8 (80.2)	32.0 (89.6)	32.0 (89.6)	30.5 (86.9)	27.0 (80.6)	21.6 (70.9)	13.4 (56.1)	6.6 (43.9)	20.0 (67.9)
Daily mean °C (°F)	−0.5 (31.1)	3.1 (37.6)	8.9 (48.0)	15.1 (59.2)	20.7 (69.3)	25.8 (78.4)	27.3 (81.1)	25.8 (78.4)	21.2 (70.2)	15.3 (59.5)	7.6 (45.7)	1.4 (34.5)	14.3 (57.8)
Mean daily minimum °C (°F)	−4.3 (24.3)	−1.2 (29.8)	3.9 (39.0)	9.7 (49.5)	15.1 (59.2)	20.3 (68.5)	23.3 (73.9)	22.1 (71.8)	16.7 (62.1)	10.5 (50.9)	3.2 (37.8)	−2.4 (27.7)	9.7 (49.5)
Record low °C (°F)	−17.3 (0.9)	−15.3 (4.5)	−9.4 (15.1)	−2.1 (28.2)	4.2 (39.6)	11.8 (53.2)	16.7 (62.1)	10.3 (50.5)	4.1 (39.4)	−2.1 (28.2)	−16.5 (2.3)	−15.1 (4.8)	−17.3 (0.9)
Average precipitation mm (inches)	7.5 (0.30)	11.9 (0.47)	17.3 (0.68)	32.8 (1.29)	50.4 (1.98)	68.7 (2.70)	154.9 (6.10)	121.3 (4.78)	70.6 (2.78)	30.4 (1.20)	26.5 (1.04)	8.2 (0.32)	600.5 (23.64)
Average precipitation days (≥ 0.1 mm)	3.2	3.8	3.9	5.2	6.2	7.6	11.2	9.4	7.3	5.8	4.7	2.9	71.2
Average snowy days	3.1	2.9	0.9	0.2	0	0	0	0	0	0	0.9	2.1	10.1
Average relative humidity (%)	66	63	61	66	67	64	79	83	78	70	70	68	70
Mean monthly sunshine hours	134.0	141.8	187.3	212.0	230.2	215.5	183.8	175.0	167.4	168.9	148.7	138.8	2,103.4
Percentage possible sunshine	43	46	50	54	53	50	42	42	46	49	49	46	48
Source: China Meteorological Administration all-time January high
