= Ting (administrative unit) =

Administrative division of ancient China

A ting (Chinese: 亭; pinyin: Tíng) was an administrative unit of the Qin and Han dynasties of China, 10x10 li in area. The most famous former ting leader was Liu Bang (the future founder of the Han dynasty), who served under the Qin dynasty.

The Qin- and Han-era ting (亭) should not be confused with the unrelated ting (廳) of the Qing dynasty. The latter is often translated as subprefecture.

== See also ==
- History of the administrative divisions of China
