= Heze =

Heze 菏泽市 Hotseh, Tsaochow
- Prefecture-level city
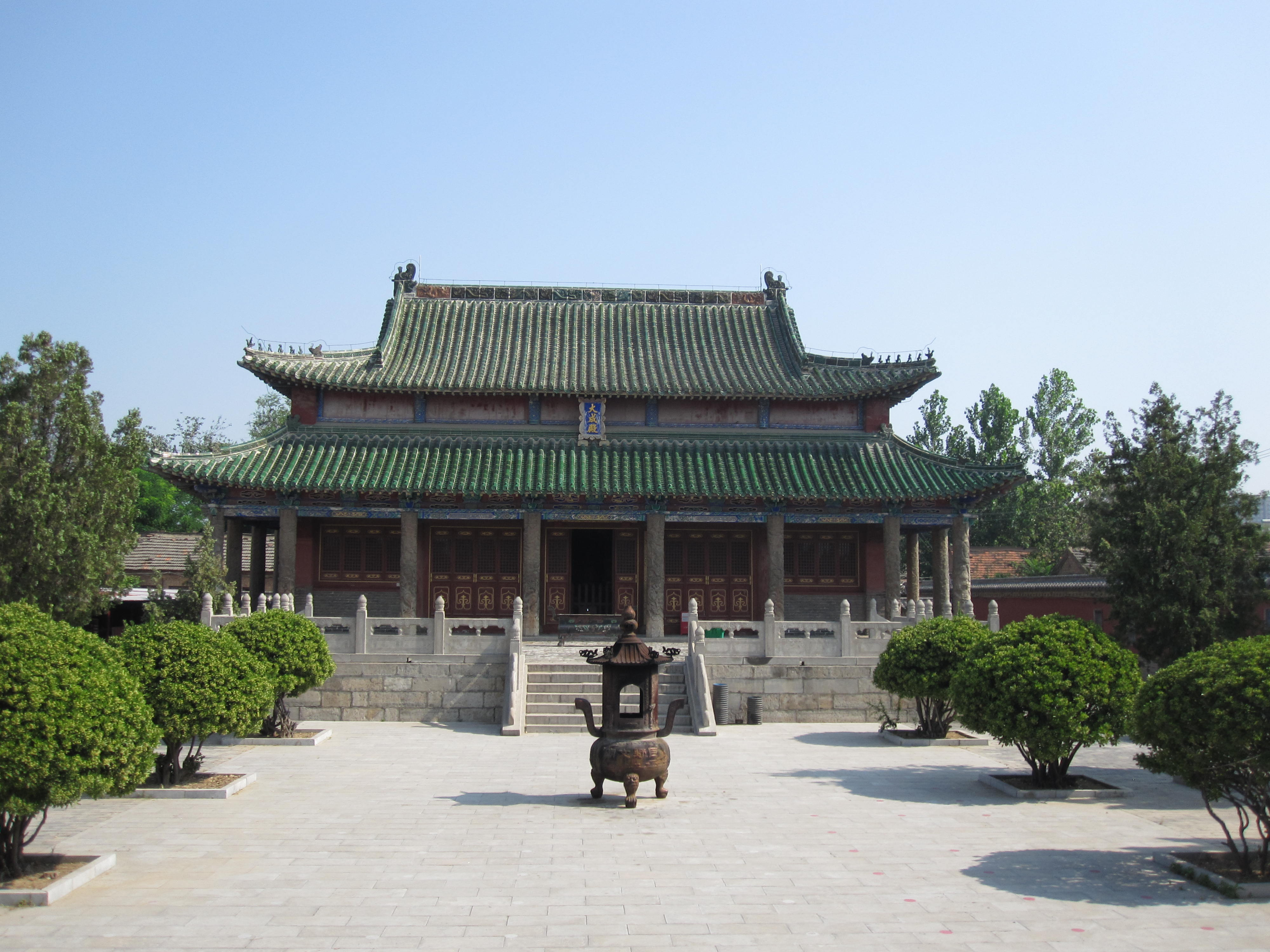
- A pagoda in Juye County of Heze

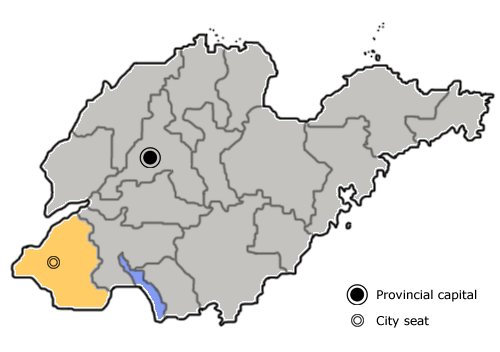
- Location of Heze City jurisdiction in Shandong
- Interactive map of Heze
- Coordinates (Heze municipal government): 35°14′03″N 115°28′47″E
- Country: People's Republic of China
- Province: Shandong
- County-level divisions: 9
- Township-level divisions: 158
- Municipal seat: Mudan District

Government
  - Mayor: Sun Aijun (孙爱军)

Area
  - Prefecture-level city: 12,256 km^{2} (4,732 sq mi)
  - Urban: 1,416 km^{2} (547 sq mi)
  - Metro: 1,416 km^{2} (547 sq mi)

Population (2010 census)
  - Prefecture-level city: 8,287,693
  - Density: 676.22/km^{2} (1,751.4/sq mi)
  - Urban: 1,346,717
  - Urban density: 951.1/km^{2} (2,463/sq mi)
  - Metro: 1,346,717
  - Metro density: 951.1/km^{2} (2,463/sq mi)

GDP
  - Prefecture-level city: CN¥ 307 billion US$ 46.5 billion
  - Per capita: CN¥ 35,184; US$ 5,317
- Time zone: UTC+8 (China Standard)
- Postal code: 274000
- Area code: 0530
- ISO 3166 code: CN-SD-17
- Licence plate prefixes: 鲁R

Heze
- Traditional Chinese: 菏澤
- Simplified Chinese: 菏泽
- Literal meaning: He Marsh
Transcriptions
Standard Mandarin
- Hanyu Pinyin: Hézé
- Wade–Giles: Ho-tsê
- IPA: [xɤ̌.tsɤ̌]

Former names

Caozhou
- Chinese: 曹州
- Postal: Tsaochow
Transcriptions
Standard Mandarin
- Hanyu Pinyin: Cáozhōu
- Wade–Giles: Ts‘ao-chou

Heze (Chinese: 菏泽; pinyin: Hézé) is the westernmost prefecture-level city in Shandong province, China. The Peony Capital of China, formerly known as Caozhou, the city borders Jining to the east, and the provinces of Henan and Anhui to the west and south respectively. The total area is 12238.62 square kilometers and the population is 10.58 million. It governs Mudan District and Dingtao District, 2 districts and 7 counties including Caoxian, Chengwu, Shanxian, Juye, Yuncheng, Juancheng and Dongming.

Heze was originally a natural ancient Ze, where Ji River converged and He River flowed out, connecting the two major water systems of Gu Ji River and Sishui River. It was renamed Longchi in the Tang Dynasty and Xiayue Lake in the Qing Dynasty. In the 13th year of the Yongzheng reign of the Qing Dynasty (1735), Caozhou was promoted to a prefecture and a county was established under the jurisdiction of Guo. Due to the presence of "Heshan" in the south and "Leize" in the north, it was named Heze. Heze has a long history and enjoys the reputation of being "among the best in the world". The nine lakes of Heze, Leize, Dayezhe, and Mengzhuze in the "Yu Gong" are all located within its borders. The founder of humanities, Fuxi, the emperor of Dongyi, Shaohao, the wise monarch, Shun, the warlord and war god Chiyou, the reformer Wu Qi, the military strategist Sun Bin, the agricultural scientist Fan Shengzhi, the economist Liu Yan, and the literary scholar Wen Zisheng were all born here. Liu Bang ascended to the throne and proclaimed himself emperor, Cao Cao achieved hegemony, Huang Chaoqiyi, and Song Jiangjuyi all occurred in Heze.

Heze is a place where the ancestral culture of the Chinese nation blends together, and is one of the important birthplaces of Chinese civilization. Heze is the birthplace of Fuxi's mulberry trees, the hometown of Yao and Shun, and the center of Dayu's flood control. The capital of the Shang Dynasty, Beibo (now Cao County) and Bi (now north of Yuncheng), are located within its borders. Among the ten philosophers of Confucius, Ran Geng, Ran Yong, and Ran Qiu; Among the ten philosophers of Wumiao, Sun Bin, Wu Qi, and Li Qi were all born in Heze. Heze is closely related to the historical turning point of "Han Qi Tang Luo". In the early Han Dynasty, Peng Yue, Chen Pi, and Lv Ze were military generals from Heze who helped the Han Dynasty to conquer the land; Emperor Gaozu Liu Bang ascended the throne and declared himself emperor on the Yang of the Fanshui River in Dingtao, opening up the source of the Great Han Dynasty; Liu Bang's original wife from Heze, Lv Zhi, was the first empress of China and the only woman listed in the "Annals of the Grand Historian". Her ruling position in court and commanding the world was equivalent to that of an emperor. At the end of the Tang Dynasty, the uprising of Wang Xianzhi and Huang Chao from Heze accelerated the decline of the Tang Dynasty. The last emperor of the Tang Dynasty, Li Bai, died and was buried in Jiyin (now Heze), leading to the downfall of the Tang Dynasty.

There are more than 100 cultural relics and historic sites in the territory, 6 national-level cultural relics protection units, and 52 provincial-level cultural relics protection units. Places of interest include Caozhou Peony Garden, Yuncheng Water Margin, Sunbin Tourist City, Dingtao Han Tomb, Shanxian Archway, Jinshan Mountain, Fangshan Mountain, Fulong Lake, the scenery of the old Yellow River route, etc.

== City flower ==
Mudan is the city flower of Heze. The earliest documentary of Mudan is in Classic of Poetry, written almost 3,000 years ago. Mudan is also called the "king of flowers" from the Bencao Gangmu. It is a symbol of honor, peace, wealth, love, aristocracy and feminine beauty. There are 9 types of Mudan based on the colors: red, white, purple, yellow, blue, green, black, pink, and multi-colored.

== Climate ==
Heze has a monsoon-influenced climate that lies between the humid subtropical and humid continental zones (Köppen Cwa/Dwa), with four well-defined seasons. The city is warm and nearly rainless in spring, hot and humid in summer, crisp in autumn and cold and dry in winter. The mean annual temperature is 14.22 °C (57.6 °F), with the monthly 24-hour average temperature ranging from −0.5 °C (31.1 °F) in January to 27.1 °C (80.8 °F) in July. Nearly 70% of the annual precipitation occurs from June to September. With monthly percent possible sunshine ranging from 48% in July to 60% in May, the city receives 2,411 hours of bright sunshine annually.

At the same time, Heze is also an area prone to meteorological disasters. Droughts and floods are one of them, especially droughts that occur frequently and have a large impact, causing the most serious harm.

Climate data for Heze, elevation 51 m (167 ft), (1991–2020 normals, extremes 1953-present)
Month	Jan	Feb	Mar	Apr	May	Jun	Jul	Aug	Sep	Oct	Nov	Dec	Year
Record high °C (°F)	19.3 (66.7)	23.2 (73.8)	28.5 (83.3)	35.5 (95.9)	39.2 (102.6)	42.0 (107.6)	41.8 (107.2)	38.6 (101.5)	36.0 (96.8)	32.7 (90.9)	26.8 (80.2)	20.6 (69.1)	42.0 (107.6)
Mean daily maximum °C (°F)	4.9 (40.8)	9.0 (48.2)	15.2 (59.4)	21.7 (71.1)	27.1 (80.8)	31.9 (89.4)	32.2 (90.0)	30.8 (87.4)	27.1 (80.8)	21.7 (71.1)	13.6 (56.5)	6.9 (44.4)	20.2 (68.3)
Daily mean °C (°F)	0.0 (32.0)	3.6 (38.5)	9.4 (48.9)	15.7 (60.3)	21.3 (70.3)	26.1 (79.0)	27.6 (81.7)	26.2 (79.2)	21.6 (70.9)	15.7 (60.3)	8.1 (46.6)	1.8 (35.2)	14.8 (58.6)
Mean daily minimum °C (°F)	−3.6 (25.5)	−0.5 (31.1)	4.8 (40.6)	10.6 (51.1)	16.1 (61.0)	21.0 (69.8)	23.8 (74.8)	22.6 (72.7)	17.5 (63.5)	11.2 (52.2)	3.9 (39.0)	−1.8 (28.8)	10.5 (50.8)
Record low °C (°F)	−20.4 (−4.7)	−15.6 (3.9)	−11.3 (11.7)	−4.4 (24.1)	3.8 (38.8)	10.2 (50.4)	15.4 (59.7)	12.1 (53.8)	4.8 (40.6)	−1.3 (29.7)	−12.9 (8.8)	−17.5 (0.5)	−20.4 (−4.7)
Average precipitation mm (inches)	6.5 (0.26)	11.9 (0.47)	17.3 (0.68)	32.1 (1.26)	49.6 (1.95)	62.0 (2.44)	166.7 (6.56)	138.6 (5.46)	74.4 (2.93)	31.6 (1.24)	27.4 (1.08)	8.9 (0.35)	627 (24.68)
Average precipitation days (≥ 0.1 mm)	3.0	3.8	3.9	4.6	6.4	7.6	11.4	10.5	7.4	5.4	5.3	2.9	72.2
Average snowy days	3.6	3.1	1.1	0.2	0	0	0	0	0	0	0.9	2.4	11.3
Average relative humidity (%)	65	61	58	62	65	64	78	82	77	70	70	67	68
Mean monthly sunshine hours	142.0	153.6	203.4	227.7	251.2	237.2	209.8	201.1	181.5	183.0	152.9	143.1	2,286.5
Percentage possible sunshine	45	49	55	58	58	55	48	49	49	53	50	47	51
Source: China Meteorological Administration extremes all-time January high

== Administration ==
The prefecture-level city of Heze administers nine county-level divisions. The municipal executive, legislature and judiciary are in Mudan District (牡丹区), together with CPC and public security bureaux.

There are two districts, seven counties, and 2 additional development zones:

- Mudan District (牡丹区)
- Dingtao District (定陶区)
- Cao County (曹县)
- Chengwu County (成武县) - originally in Huxi
- Shan County (单县) - originally in Huxi
- Juye County (巨野县) - originally in Huxi
- Yuncheng County (郓城县)
- Juancheng County (鄄城县)
- Dongming County (东明县)
- Heze Economic and Technological Development Zone (菏泽经济技术开发区)
- Heze High-Tech Development Zone (菏泽高新技术开发区)

These are further divided into 158 township-level divisions.

Map
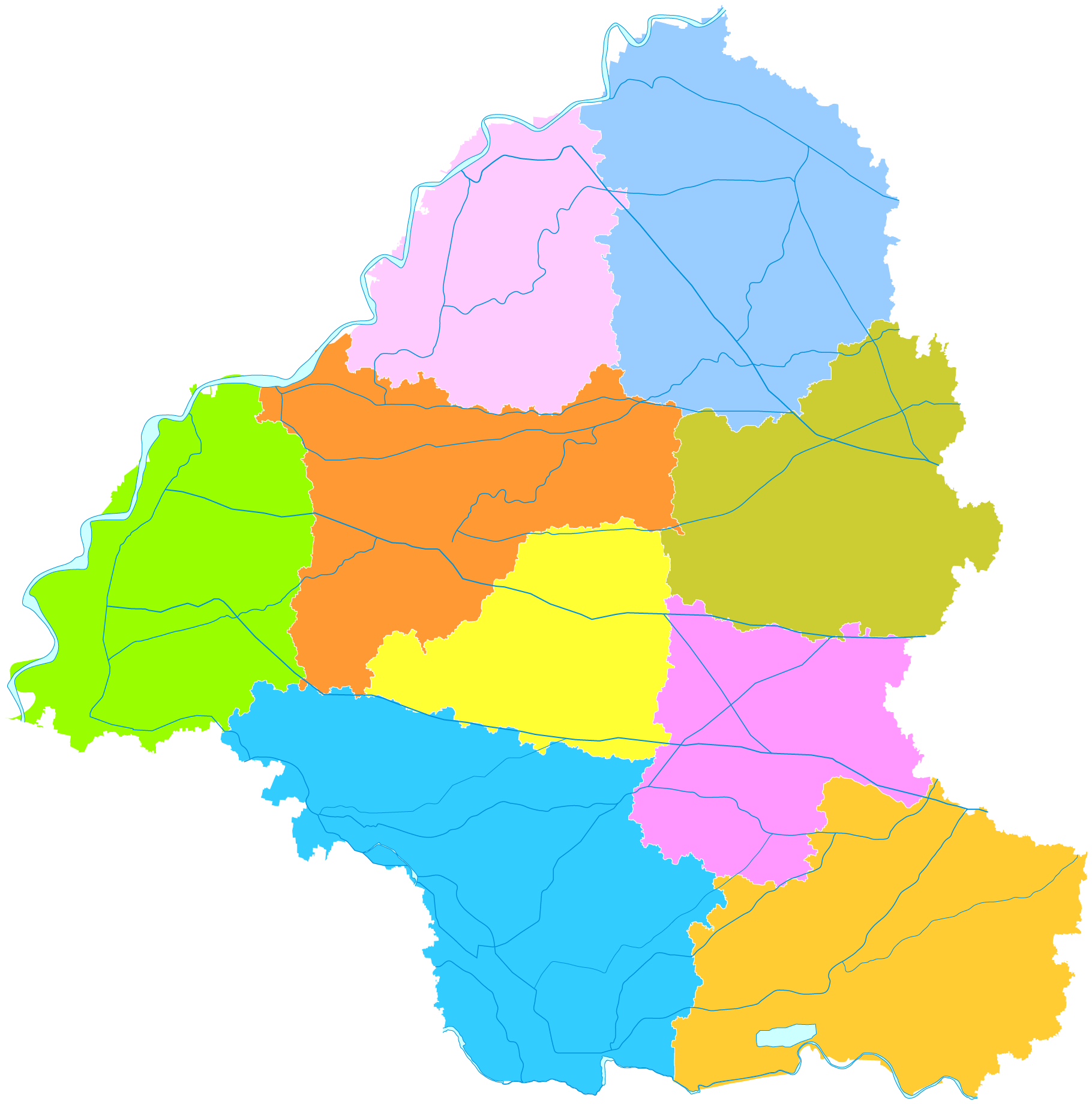

== Demographics ==
According to the 2020 Chinese census, Heze was home to 8,287,693 people, of whom 1,346,717 live in the built-up area around the seat of government in Mudan District. The permanent population in the territory is mainly Han, and the ethnic minorities include Hui, Manchu, Tibetan, Miao, Uyghur, Kazakh, Zhuang, Mongolian and other ethnic groups.

== Government ==
The current mayor is Li Chunying and the chairman of the Municipal Council is Wang Weidong.

== Culture ==
Heze is rich in cultural tourism resources and is known as the capital of peonies, the hometown of opera, martial arts, calligraphy and painting, and folk art. Peony cultivation began in the Sui Dynasty, flourished in the Tang Dynasty, and flourished in the Ming Dynasty. By the Ming and Qing Dynasties, it had become the center of peony cultivation in China. It is known as "Caozhou has the best peonies in the world, and Heze has the best peonies in the world."

=== Places of interest ===
- Caozhou Mudan Garden: It is the largest Mudan (Peony) garden in Heze and with the most varieties.
- One Hundred Lion Square: It is famous for its column carved with 100 stone lions in different postures. It represents best wishes and longevity. The archway is 14 meters high and 9 meters wide. The 100 lions with different shapes represent superb architectural skills and immortal artistic value, which fully embodies the wisdom and strength of the ancient people.
- Shui Hu Hero City: It is famous for the teaching and communication of martial arts and ancient buildings. It is also the Chinese ancient residence museum, CCTV-recommended tour routes and the source of water margins.
- Fulong Lake Tourism Resort:Located in the southwest of Shanxian County, Heze City, Shandong Province, with a total area of 58.6 square kilometres, Furong Lake Tourism Resort is the second largest plain reservoir in Shandong Province, and is known as the 'Pearl of the Old Road, the West Lake of the North of the Yangtze River'. Floating Dragon Lake is the site of Mengzhuze, one of the four most famous zones in China.

=== Foods ===
- Shanxian lamb soup: The soup was first made in 1807. The taste is fresh but not mutton, and fragrant but not greasy. After more than 200 years of development and innovation of soup, it can be carried forward and accepted in many years. It is not only refreshing, but also functional in medicinal meal.
- Peony cake: During a flower festival in which season when peonies are in full bloom, Wu Zetian led a maid to enjoy the flowers in the garden and ordered the maid to pluck a large number of flowers of various colors. After return to the palace, according to her design, she mashed them with rice, steaming them to make a cake known as the "hundred-flower cake" and used this dessert as a gift to officials.
- Pijia roast chicken: The sauce is in color red, and you can smell the rich roast chicken scent just a few feet away from the pot. Its outstanding characteristics are fresh, fragrant, and tender with consistent taste inside and out.
- Caozhou sesame cake: Its shape is round as a moon, tender inside with a crispy crust. Its ingredients include wheat essence powder, sesame oil, salt, pepper, fennel powder and other oil-based products.
- Ju Ye pot of soup: Jar soup is the most representative of Shandong is the most representative characteristics of the south-west of Shandong traditional food. Originating from Daxieji Town, Juno County, Heze City, Shandong Province, it is the most authentic soup in Daxieji Town. Has been registered in the State Administration for Industry and Commerce 'Xieji authentic jar soup' trademark. It is one of the most popular soups among the local people, and has been listed as one of the famous foods in Southwest Shandong Province and Shandong Province, and was named as one of the famous Chinese foods in 2004.

== Transportation ==
Heze has convenient transportation and has formed a transportation network consisting of four modes of transportation: railway, highway, shipping, aviation, and pipeline. The Beijing-Kowloon Railway Line and the Xinyan Line cross the territory, running through Caoxian, Dingtao, Mudan District, and Juan respectively. Cheng, Yuncheng, Dongming, Juye and other counties, there are 8 county-level railway stations; Beijing-Kowloon High-speed Railway and Shandong-Nan High-speed Railway intersect here, and highway transportation is developed.

- Highway: China National Highway 220; China National Highway 105; China National Highway 106; China National Highway 240; China National Highway 327
- Heze Mudan Airport opened on April 2, 2021.
- Conventional rail services call at Heze railway station, high-speed services call at Heze East railway station.

== Economy ==
Heze is the largest center in China for the cultivation of the "national flower" peony, after which the Mudan District was named. Over 30% of its GDP comes from the sale of peony.

== Sister cities ==
- Mobile, Alabama
