= Tangcun =

Tangcun may refer to:

- Tangcun, Hunan (塘村镇), town in Chenzhou City, Hunan, China
- Tangcun, Xincai County (棠村镇), town in Henan, China
- Tangcun, Shandong (唐村镇), town in Zoucheng City, Shandong, China
- Tangcun Township (唐村乡), in Fengxiang County, Shaanxi, China
