= Jining Qufu Airport =

Jining Qufu Airport 济宁曲阜机场
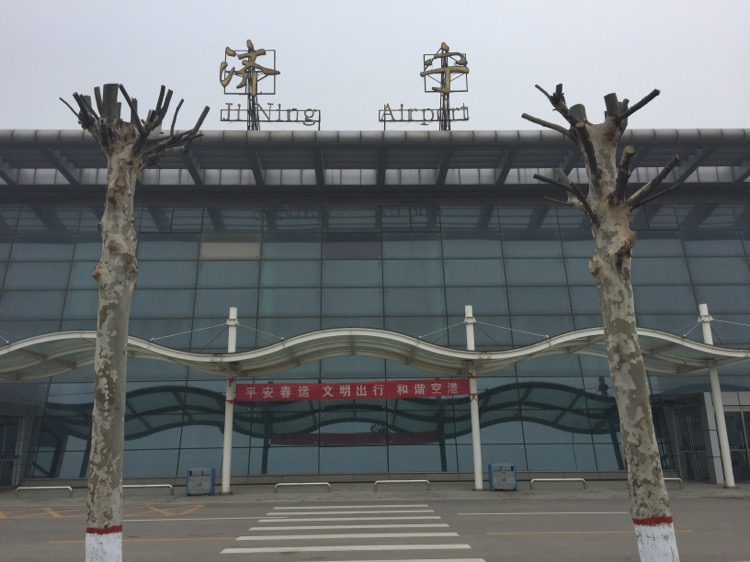
- IATA: ~~JNG~~; ICAO: ~~ZSJG~~

Summary
- Airport type: Public / military
- Serves: Jining and Qufu, Shandong
- Location: Zhifang, Jiaxiang County, Shandong
- Coordinates: 35°17′34″N 116°20′48″E

Map
- Location of airport in Shandong

Runways
Direction	Length		Surface
Direction	m	ft	Surface
09/27	2,800	9,186	Concrete

Statistics (2021)
- Passengers: 1,006,299
- Aircraft movements: 10,868
- Cargo (metric tons): 2,662.9
- Source: CAAC

Jining Qufu Airport
- Simplified Chinese: 济宁曲阜机场
- Traditional Chinese: 濟寧曲阜機場
Transcriptions
Standard Mandarin
- Hanyu Pinyin: Jìníng Qūfù Jīchǎng

Jining Qufu Airport ~~(IATA: JNG, ICAO: ZSJG)~~ was an airport serving the cities of Jining and Qufu, the hometown of Confucius, in Shandong Province, China. The airport was located 25 kilometers west of downtown Jining. The airport closed on 28 December 2023 when the new Jining Da'an Airport opened.

== See also ==
- List of airports in China
