= Zhangzhuang, Zoucheng =

Zhangzhuang 张庄镇
- Town
- Location in Shandong Zhangzhuang (China)
- Coordinates: 35°22′00″N 117°14′32″E
- Country: People's Republic of China
- Province: Shandong
- Prefecture-level city: Jining
- County-level city: Zoucheng
- Time zone: UTC+8 (China Standard)

Zhangzhuang (Chinese: 张庄镇) is a town in Zoucheng, Jining, in southwestern Shandong province, China.
