= Chengqian =

Chengqian 城前镇
- Town
- Location in Shandong Chengqian (China)
- Coordinates: 35°20′21″N 117°24′36″E
- Country: People's Republic of China
- Province: Shandong
- Prefecture-level city: Jining
- County-level city: Zoucheng
- Time zone: UTC+8 (China Standard)

Chengqian (Chinese: 城前镇) is a town in Zoucheng, Jining, in southwestern Shandong province, China.
