= Guoli, Zoucheng =

Guoli 郭里镇
- Town
- Location in Shandong Guoli (China)
- Coordinates: 35°13′21″N 116°48′56″E
- Country: People's Republic of China
- Province: Shandong
- Prefecture-level city: Jining
- County-level city: Zoucheng
- Time zone: UTC+8 (China Standard)

Guoli (Chinese: 郭里镇) is a town in Zoucheng, Jining, in southwestern Shandong province, China. As of 2018, it has 39 villages under its administration.
