= Tuanli =

Tuanli 疃里镇
- Town
- Location in Shandong Tuanli (China)
- Coordinates: 35°26′38″N 116°23′47″E
- Country: People's Republic of China
- Province: Shandong
- Prefecture-level city: Jining
- County: Jiaxiang
- Time zone: UTC+8 (China Standard)

Tuanli (Chinese: 疃里镇) is a town in Jiaxiang, Jining, in southwestern Shandong province, China.
