= Beisu, Shandong =

Beisu 北宿镇
- Town
- Location in Shandong Beisu (China)
- Coordinates: 35°21′28″N 116°53′33″E
- Country: People's Republic of China
- Province: Shandong
- Prefecture-level city: Jining
- County-level city: Zoucheng
- Time zone: UTC+8 (China Standard)

Beisu (Chinese: 北宿镇) is a town in Zoucheng, Jining, in southwestern Shandong province, China. As of 2018, it has two residential communities and 50 villages under its administration.

== See also ==
- List of township-level divisions of Shandong
