= Taiping, Zoucheng =

Taiping 太平镇
- Town
- Location in Shandong Taiping (China)
- Coordinates: 35.3335°N 116.8347°E
- Country: People's Republic of China
- Province: Shandong
- Prefecture-level city: Jining
- County-level city: Zoucheng
- Time zone: UTC+8 (China Standard)

Taiping (Chinese: 太平; pinyin: Tàipíng) is a town in Zoucheng, Jining, in southwestern Shandong province, China. As of 2020, it administers Baodian Residential Community (鲍店社区) and the following 92 villages:

- Zhuangli Village (庄里村)
- Zhongtaocheng Village (中陶城村)
- Xizhaozhuang Village (西赵庄村)
- Zhaoqiao Village (赵桥村)
- Zhangjiaxing Village (张家行村)
- Zhaijiaxing Village (翟家行村)
- Yingou Village (尹沟村)
- Xingfulou Village (幸福楼村)
- Xiejiazhuang Village (谢家庄村)
- Xiliyan Village (西里彦村)
- Xijigou First Village (西纪沟一村)
- Xijigou Second Village (西纪沟二村)
- Xijigou Third Village (西纪沟三村)
- Xiguaitou Village (西拐头村)
- Xibaozhang Village (西宝张村)
- Wangshi Village (王石村)
- Wangfuzhai Village (王府寨村)
- Taixinzhuang Village (太辛庄村)
- Taiping First Village (太平一村)
- Taiping Second Village (太平二村)
- Taiping Third Village (太平三村)
- Taiping Fourth Village (太平四村)
- Sunmiao Village (孙庙村)
- Shaozhuang Village (邵庄村)
- Qiujialou Village (邱家楼村)
- Qinshi Village (秦石村)
- Qinhe Village (秦河村)
- Nankangfu Village (南亢阜村)
- Nantaocheng Village (南陶城村)
- Majie Village (马街村)
- Liumiao Village (刘庙村)
- Linjiahai Village (林家海村)
- Lijie Village (李街村)
- Lijiaji Village (李家集村)
- Jiadao Village (夹道村)
- Huangyuan Village (黄园村)
- Houwangzhuang Village (候王庄村)
- Haozhuang Village (郝庄村)
- Hanshi Village (韩石村)
- Hanlou Village (韩楼村)
- Hankeng Village (韩坑村)
- Guozhuang Village (果庄村)
- Guanyintang Village (观音堂村)
- Gaoying Village (高营村)
- Gaoshi Village (高石村)
- Gaojiachang Village (高家场村)
- Fengjiazhuang Village (冯家庄村)
- Fenglou Village (冯楼村)
- Fengjiaji Village (冯家集村)
- Fanjiaqiao Village (樊家桥村)
- Dongshi Village (董石村)
- Dongliyan Village (东里彦村)
- Dongjigou First Village (东纪沟一村)
- Dongjigou Second Village (东纪沟二村)
- Dongguaitou Village (东拐头村)
- Dongbianzhuang Village (东边庄村)
- Cuizhuang Village (崔庄村)
- Cuijing Village (崔井村)
- Dabianzhuang Village (大边庄村)
- Beikangfu Village (北亢阜村)
- Baiyitang Village (白衣堂村)
- Anshang Village (庵上村)
- Zhongxing Village (中行村)
- Zhongbaojiadian Village (中鲍家店村)
- Zhengxing Village (郑行村)
- Yinzhang Village (银张村)
- Yao'anzhuang Village (姚安庄村)
- Xingxing Village (杏行村)
- Xing Village (邢村)
- Xinliuzhuang Village (新刘庄村)
- Xiejiakou Village (谢家口村)
- Xihenghe Village (西横河村)
- Wangxing Village (王行村)
- Sunpo Village (孙坡村)
- Qianhuangfuzhuang Village (前皇甫庄村)
- Qianhan Village (前韩村)
- Qianbaojiadian Village (前鲍家店村)
- Qiling Village (骑岭村)
- Pingyangsi Village (平阳寺村)
- Liuxing Village (刘行村)
- Liujiahekou Village (刘家河口村)
- Huangjiazhuang Village (黄家庄村)
- Huangchang Village (黄厂村)
- Houhan Village (后韩村)
- Houbaojiadian Village (后鲍家店村)
- Henghe Village (横河村)
- Dongbaozhang Village (东宝张村)
- Dishang Village (堤上村)
- Damachang Village (大马厂村)
- Chenzhuang Village (陈庄村)
- Beilin Village (北林村)
- Baojiachang Village (鲍家厂村)
