= Zhongxindian =

Zhongxindian 中心店镇
- Town
- Location in Shandong Zhongxindian (China)
- Coordinates: 35°26′01″N 116°54′40″E
- Country: People's Republic of China
- Province: Shandong
- Prefecture-level city: Jining
- County-level city: Zoucheng
- Time zone: UTC+8 (China Standard)

Zhongxindian (中心店镇) is a town in Zoucheng, Jining, in southwestern Shandong province, China.
