= Jintun =

Jintun 金屯镇
- Town
- Location in Shandong Jintun (China)
- Coordinates: 35°15′59″N 116°26′55″E
- Country: People's Republic of China
- Province: Shandong
- Prefecture-level city: Jining
- County: Jiaxiang
- Time zone: UTC+8 (China Standard)

Jintun (Chinese: 金屯镇) is a town in Jiaxiang, Jining, in southwestern Shandong province, China.
