= Liangbaosi =

Liangbaosi 梁宝寺镇
- Town
- Location in Shandong Liangbaosi (China)
- Coordinates: 35°34′57″N 116°12′31″E
- Country: People's Republic of China
- Province: Shandong
- Prefecture-level city: Jining
- County: Jiaxiang
- Time zone: UTC+8 (China Standard)

Liangbaosi (Chinese: 梁宝寺镇) is a town in Jiaxiang, Jining, in southwestern Shandong province, China. The town is a combination of 79 villages with a population of 90,000 people, according to July 2013 statistics.
