= Yishan, Zoucheng =

Coordinates: 35.3028°N 116.9972°E

Yishan 峄山镇
- Town
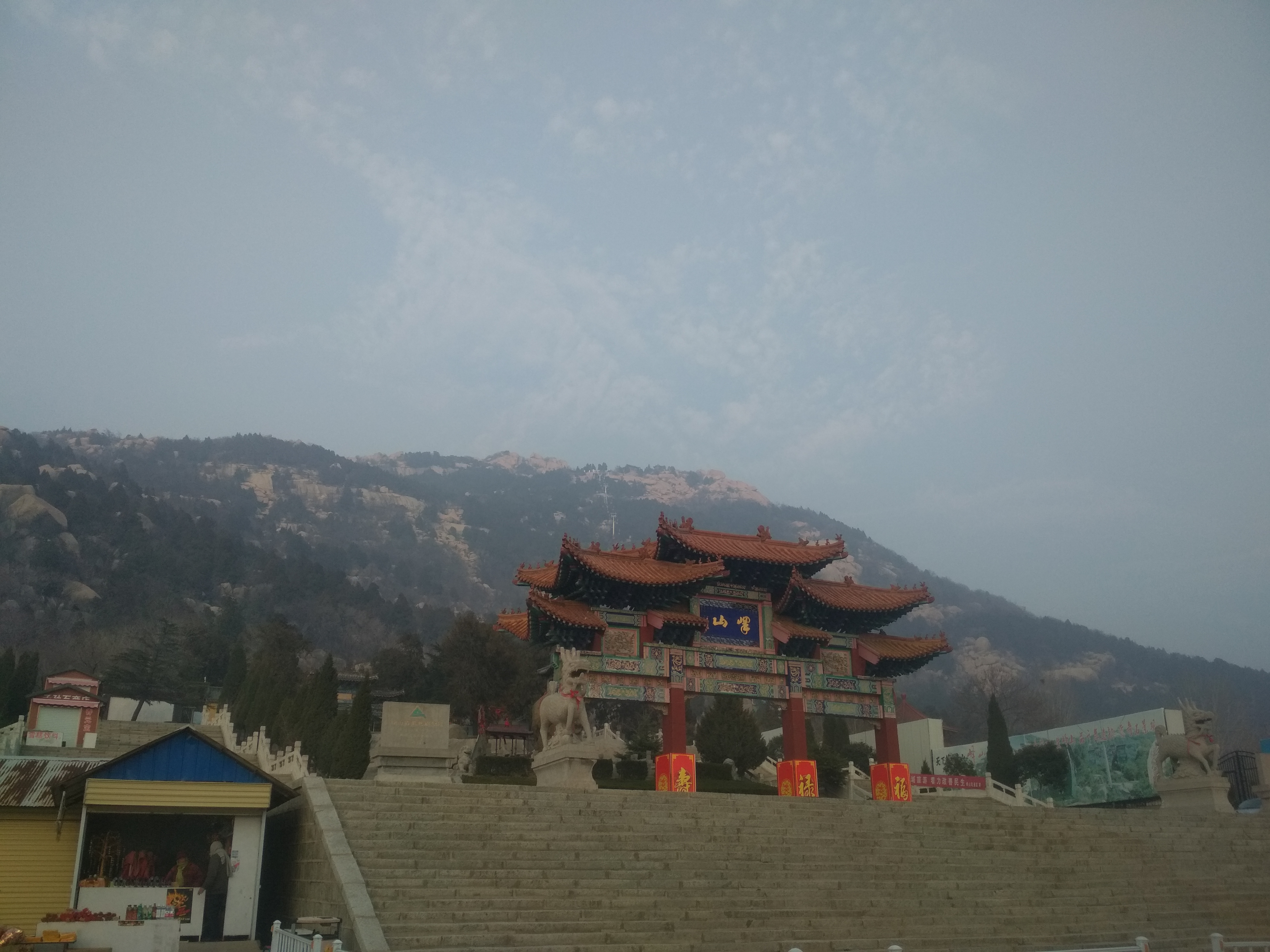
- A monastery in Yishan
- Interactive map of Yishan
- Country: People's Republic of China
- Province: Shandong
- Prefecture-level city: Jining
- County-level city: Zoucheng
- Time zone: UTC+8 (China Standard)

Yishan (Chinese: 峄山镇) is a town in Zoucheng, Jining, in southwestern Shandong province, China.
