= Macun, Shandong =

Macun 马村镇
- Town
- Location in Shandong Macun (China)
- Coordinates: 35°29′37″N 116°16′30″E
- Country: People's Republic of China
- Province: Shandong
- Prefecture-level city: Jining
- County: Jiaxiang
- Time zone: UTC+8 (China Standard)

Macun (Chinese: 马村镇) is a town in Jiaxiang, Jining, in southwestern Shandong province, China.
