= Wolongshan =

Wolongshan 卧龙山镇
- Town
- Location in Shandong Wolongshan (China)
- Coordinates: 35°24′15″N 116°17′09″E
- Country: People's Republic of China
- Province: Shandong
- Prefecture-level city: Jining
- County: Jiaxiang
- Time zone: UTC+8 (China Standard)

Wolongshan (Chinese: 卧龙山镇) is a town in Jiaxiang, Jining, in southwestern Shandong province, China.
