= Dazhanglou =

Dazhanglou 大张楼镇
- Town
- Location in Shandong Dazhanglou (China)
- Coordinates: 35°31′50″N 116°15′40″E
- Country: People's Republic of China
- Province: Shandong
- Prefecture-level city: Jining
- County: Jiaxiang
- Time zone: UTC+8 (China Standard)

Dazhanglou (Chinese: 大张楼镇) is a town in Jiaxiang, Jining, in southwestern Shandong province, China.
