= Shiqiang =

Shiqiang 石墙镇
- Town
- Location in Shandong Shiqiang (China)
- Coordinates: 35°15′44″N 116°54′27″E
- Country: People's Republic of China
- Province: Shandong
- Prefecture-level city: Jining
- County-level city: Zoucheng
- Time zone: UTC+8 (China Standard)

Shiqiang (Chinese: 石墙镇) is a town in Zoucheng, Jining, in southwestern Shandong province, China.
