= Xiangcheng =

Xiangcheng may refer to:

== People ==
- Princess Xiangcheng (襄城公主; ?–651 CE), daughter of Emperor Taizong of Tang

== Locations in China ==
- Xiangcheng City (项城市), Henan
- Xiangcheng County, Henan (襄城县)
- Xiangcheng County, Sichuan (乡城县)
- Xiangcheng District, Suzhou (相城区), Jiangsu
- Xiangcheng District, Xiangyang (襄城区), Hubei
- Xiangcheng District, Zhangzhou (芗城区), Fujian
- Xiangcheng, Jiangxi (相城镇), subdivision of Gao'an, Jiangxi
- Xiangcheng, Cangshan County (向城镇), subdivision of Cangshan County, Shandong
- Xiangcheng, Zoucheng (香城镇), subdivision of Zoucheng, Shandong

== Other ==
- Xiāngchéng (香橙), also known as yuzu, a type of citrus fruit
