= Dashu, Shandong =

Dashu 大束镇
- Town
- Location in Shandong Dashu (China)
- Coordinates: 35°26′27″N 117°05′04″E
- Country: People's Republic of China
- Province: Shandong
- Prefecture-level city: Jining
- County-level city: Zoucheng
- Time zone: UTC+8 (China Standard)

Dashu (Chinese: 大束镇) is a town in Zoucheng, Jining, in southwestern Shandong province, China. As of 2018, it has 77 villages under its administration.
