= Tianhuang, Zoucheng =

Tianhuang 田黄镇
- Town
- Location in Shandong Tianhuang (China)
- Coordinates: 35°27′12″N 117°15′45″E
- Country: People's Republic of China
- Province: Shandong
- Prefecture-level city: Jining
- County-level city: Zoucheng
- Time zone: UTC+8 (China Standard)

Tianhuang (Chinese: 田黄镇) is a town in Zoucheng, Jining, in southwestern Shandong province, China.
