= Kanzhuang =

Kanzhuang 看庄镇
- Town
- Location in Shandong Kanzhuang (China)
- Coordinates: 35°15′26″N 117°01′45″E
- Country: People's Republic of China
- Province: Shandong
- Prefecture-level city: Jining
- County-level city: Zoucheng
- Time zone: UTC+8 (China Standard)

Kanzhuang (Chinese: 看庄镇) is a town in Zoucheng, Jining, in southwestern Shandong province, China.
