= Zhifang, Shandong =

Zhifang 纸坊镇
- Town
- Location in Shandong Zhifang (China)
- Coordinates: 35°17′25″N 116°18′42″E
- Country: People's Republic of China
- Province: Shandong
- Prefecture-level city: Jining
- County: Jiaxiang
- Time zone: UTC+8 (China Standard)

Zhifang (Chinese: 纸坊镇) is a town in Jiaxiang, Jining, in southwestern Shandong province, China.
