= Zoucheng =

Zoucheng 邹城市
- County-level city
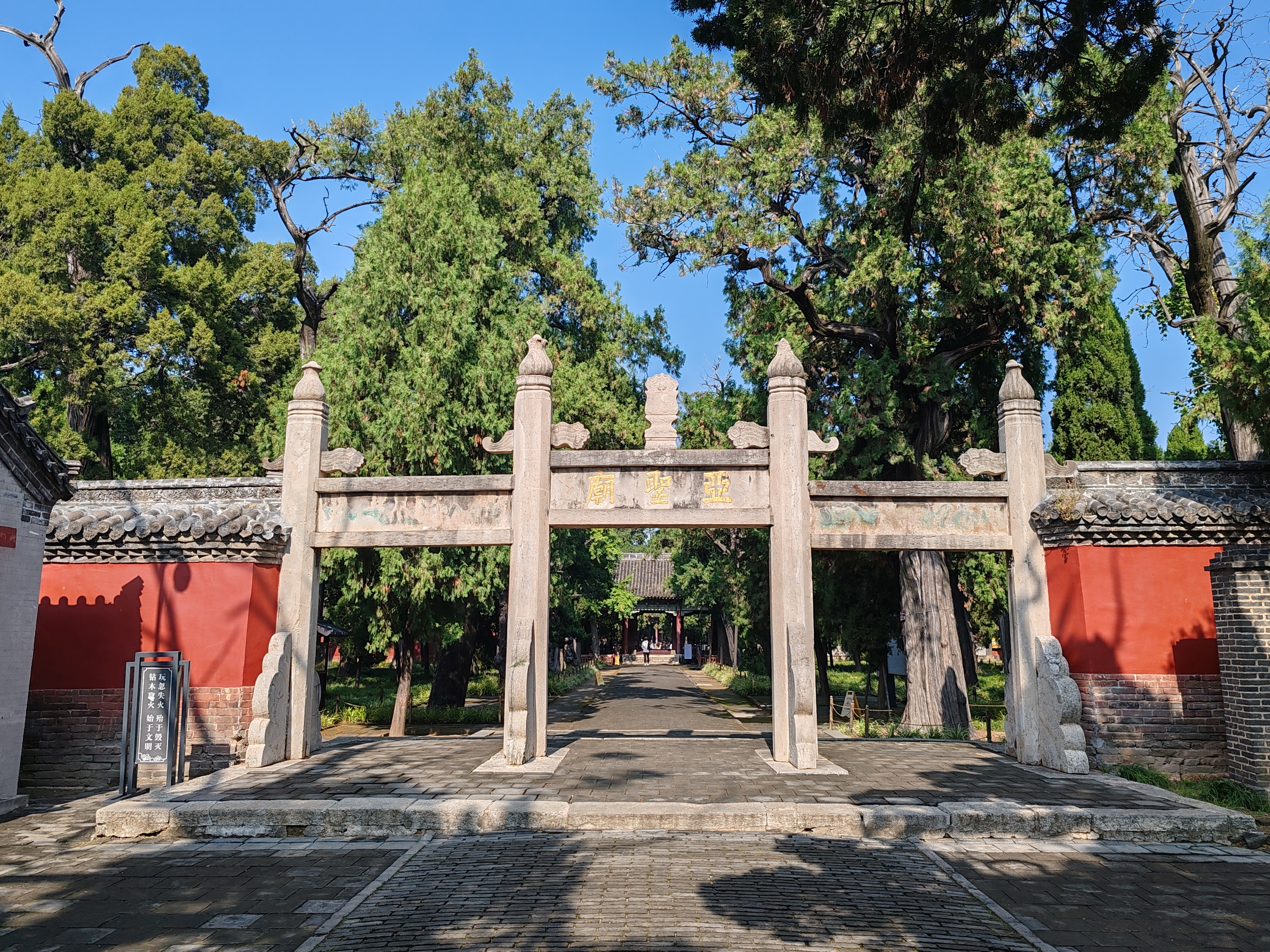
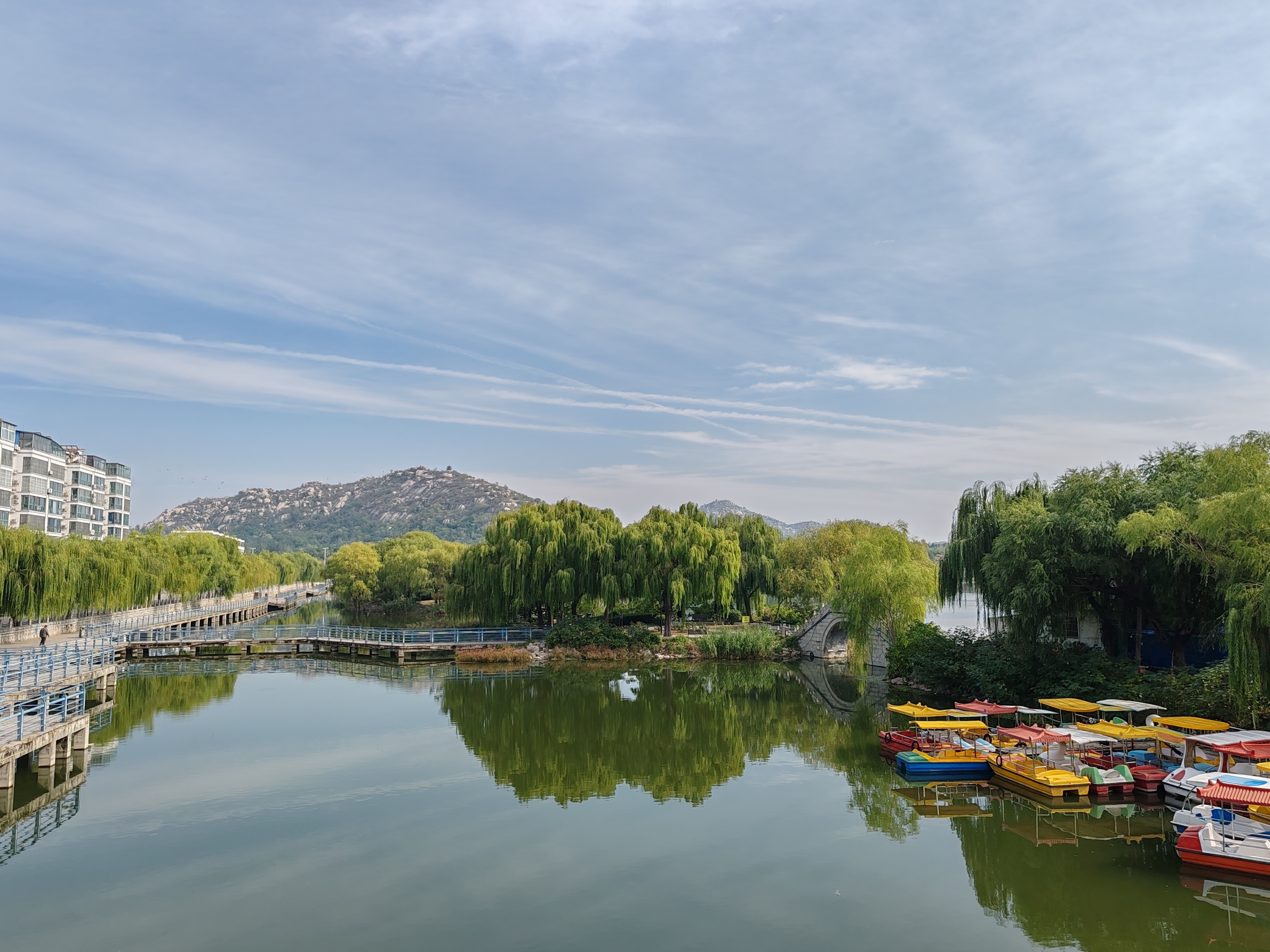
- Mencius temple Tangwang Lake

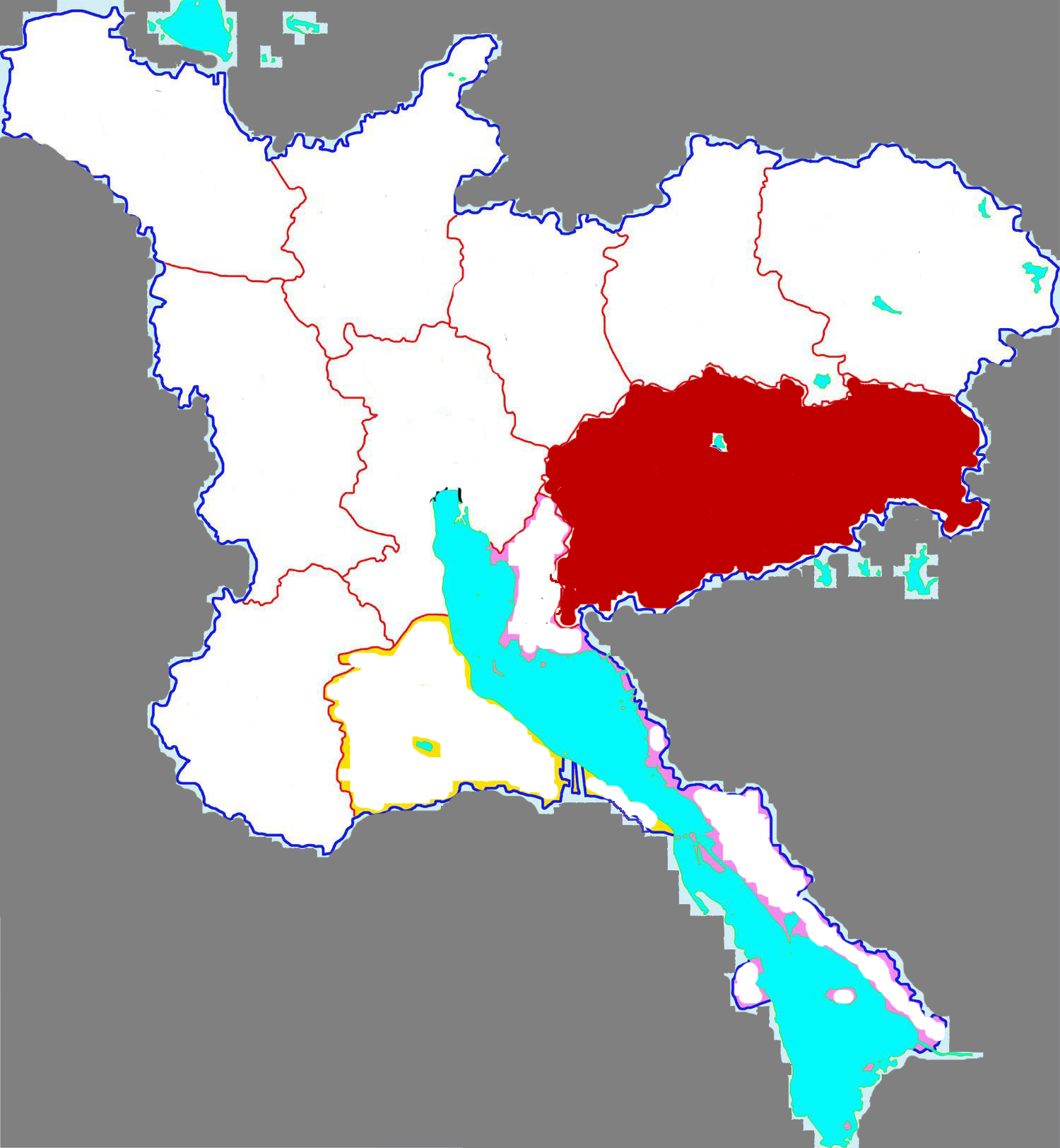
- Zoucheng in Jining

- Location of the city center in Shandong
- Coordinates: 35°24′11″N 117°00′25″E
- Country: People's Republic of China
- Province: Shandong
- Prefecture-level city: Jining

Area
  - County-level city: 1,619 km^{2} (625 sq mi)
  - Urban: 1,619 km^{2} (625 sq mi)
  - Metro: 1,619 km^{2} (625 sq mi)

Population (2019)
  - County-level city: 1,155,400
  - Urban: 1,116,692
  - Urban density: 689.7/km^{2} (1,786/sq mi)
  - Metro: 1,116,692
  - Metro density: 689.7/km^{2} (1,786/sq mi)
- Time zone: UTC+8 (China Standard)
- Postal code: 273500
- Website: zoucheng.gov.cn

Zoucheng (Chinese: 邹城市; pinyin: Zōuchéng shì) is a county-level city in the south of Shandong province, China. Before it was incorporated as a city in October 1992, it was known as Zou County (邹县) or Zouxian.

Zoucheng is located about 20 km south of the city of Qufu, and like Qufu, is administratively under the prefecture-level city of Jining. Its population was 1,116,692 at the 2010 census.

== Administrative divisions ==
Three subdistricts:

- Gangshan Subdistrict (钢山街道), Qianquan Subdistrict (千泉街道), Fushan Subdistrict (凫山街道)

Thirteen towns:

- Xiangcheng (香城镇), Chengqian (城前镇), Dashu (大束镇), Beisu (北宿镇), Zhongxindian (中心店镇), Tangcun (唐村镇), Taiping (太平镇), Shiqiang (石墙镇), Yishan (峄山镇), Kanzhuang (看庄镇), Zhangzhuang (张庄镇), Tianhuang (田黄镇), Guoli (郭里镇)

== Historical sites ==
The philosopher Mencius was born in Zoucheng, then within the feudal State of Zou. His descendants lived in Zoucheng all the way to the present. Some of them migrated to Taiwan after the Chinese Civil War and to Korea during the Tang Dynasty. In the present day, there are four major sites in the city relating to Mencius: the Mencius Temple (simplified Chinese: 孟庙; traditional Chinese: 孟廟; pinyin: Mèng Miào), the Mencius Family Mansion (孟府; Mèng Fǔ), the Mencius Forest (孟林; Mèng Lín, 35°28′42.27″N 117°2′56.11″E), and Mencius' Mother's Forest (孟母林; Mèng Mǔ Lín, 35°29′29.97″N 116°58′49.09″E).

The Mencius Temple, which covers an area of more than 4 hectares (9.9 acres) on the south side of town, has five courtyards and sixty-four halls and rooms. Its history dates back to the year 1037 in the Northern Song dynasty. The Mencius Mansion, where his descendants lived, is adjacent to the temple, and has 116 halls and rooms.

According to the management of the Mencius Temple, the temple grounds house over 270 stone steles and sculptures, some of which dating from as early as the Song dynasty. Among them are some Yuan dynasty stelae with inscriptions in 'Phags-pa script.

Immediately to the north of Zoucheng lies the tomb of the King of Lu of the Ming dynasty (明鲁王墓). It is the tomb of Zhu Tan (1370–1389), the tenth son of the Hongwu Emperor of the Ming dynasty. There is also a royal tomb from the Han dynasty (汉鲁王墓).

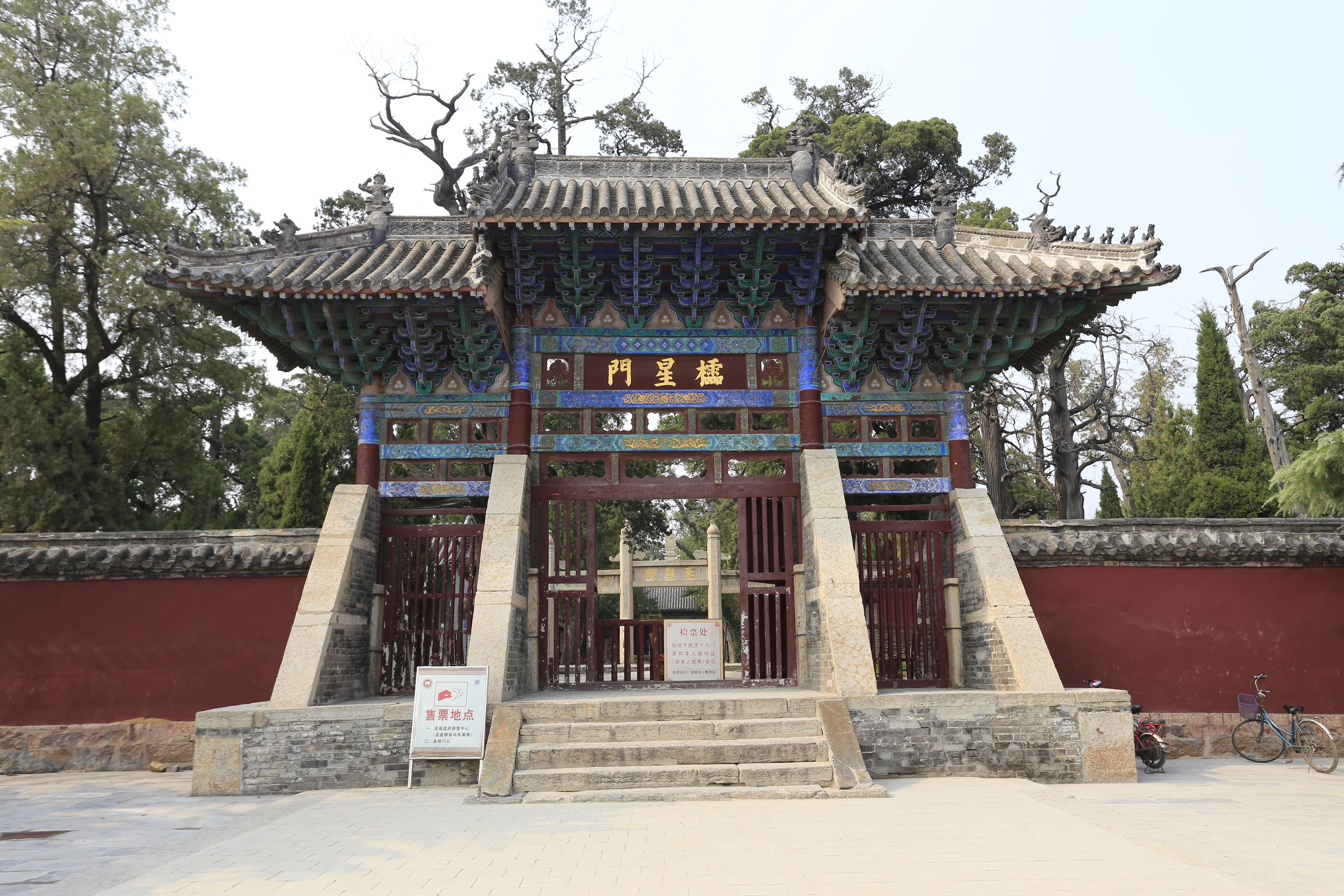
Mencius Temple

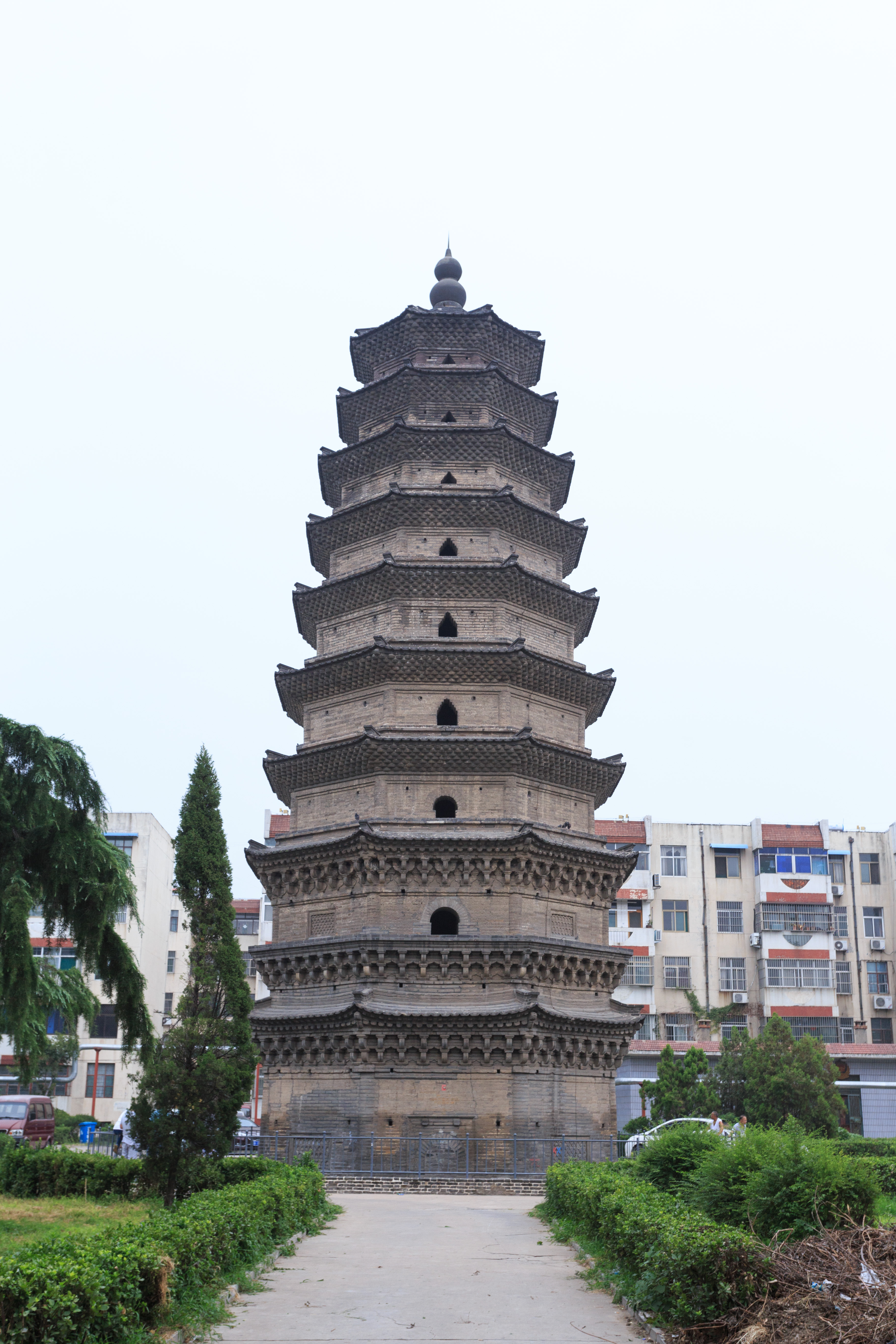
Chongxing Pagoda

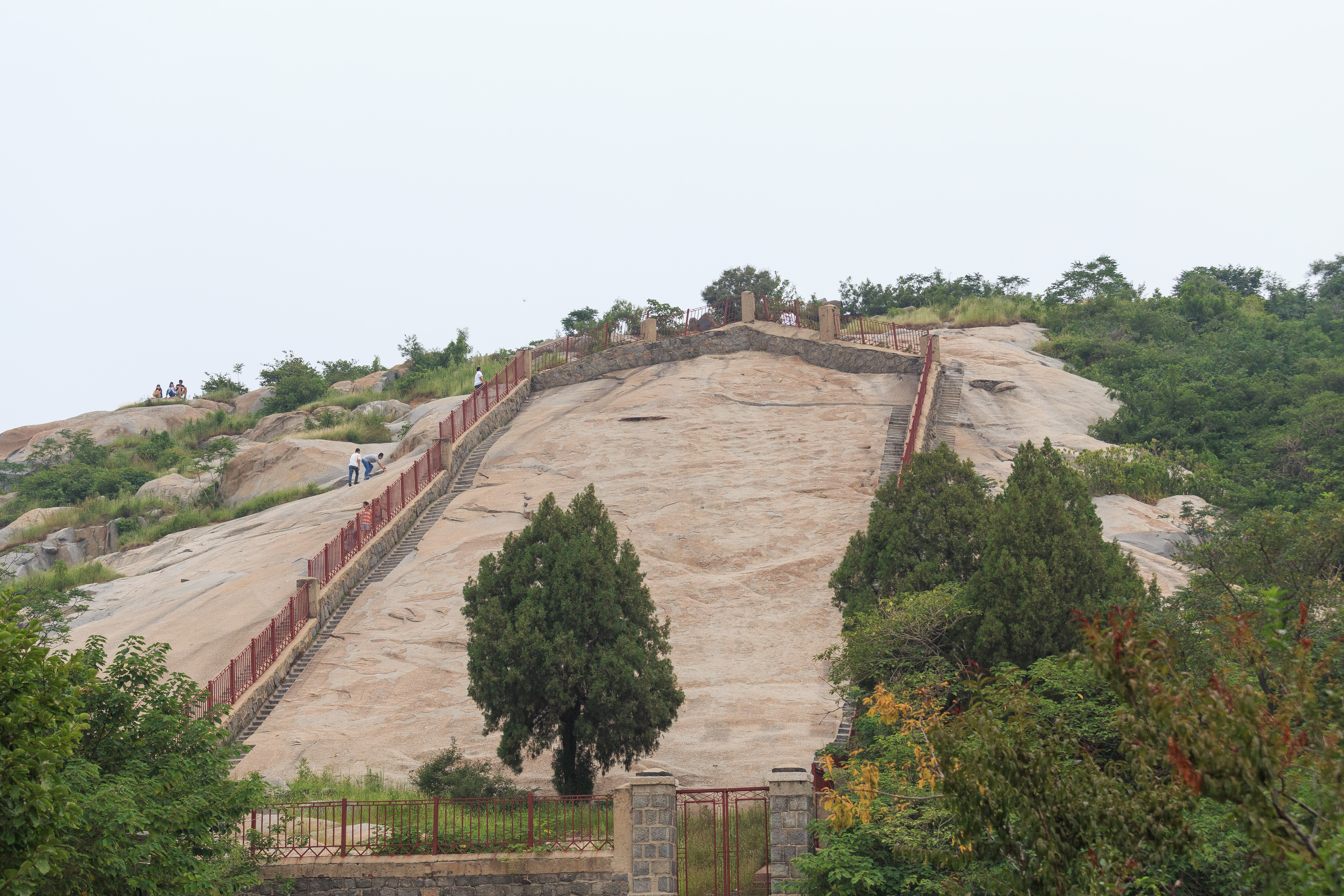
Inscriptions on precipices of Tieshan

== Climate ==
Climate data for Zoucheng, elevation 90 m (300 ft), (1991–2020 normals, extremes 1981–2010)
Month	Jan	Feb	Mar	Apr	May	Jun	Jul	Aug	Sep	Oct	Nov	Dec	Year
Record high °C (°F)	16.2 (61.2)	23.1 (73.6)	27.5 (81.5)	32.6 (90.7)	36.9 (98.4)	39.0 (102.2)	40.1 (104.2)	36.9 (98.4)	36.4 (97.5)	35.5 (95.9)	26.0 (78.8)	19.8 (67.6)	40.1 (104.2)
Mean daily maximum °C (°F)	5.1 (41.2)	8.7 (47.7)	14.7 (58.5)	21.5 (70.7)	27.0 (80.6)	31.3 (88.3)	32.0 (89.6)	30.9 (87.6)	27.3 (81.1)	21.6 (70.9)	13.6 (56.5)	6.9 (44.4)	20.1 (68.1)
Daily mean °C (°F)	0.6 (33.1)	3.9 (39.0)	9.6 (49.3)	16.2 (61.2)	21.9 (71.4)	26.3 (79.3)	27.8 (82.0)	26.7 (80.1)	22.6 (72.7)	16.7 (62.1)	9.1 (48.4)	2.6 (36.7)	15.3 (59.6)
Mean daily minimum °C (°F)	−3.0 (26.6)	0.0 (32.0)	5.2 (41.4)	11.5 (52.7)	17.0 (62.6)	21.6 (70.9)	24.1 (75.4)	23.1 (73.6)	18.4 (65.1)	12.2 (54.0)	5.2 (41.4)	−1.0 (30.2)	11.2 (52.2)
Record low °C (°F)	−16.1 (3.0)	−13.7 (7.3)	−8.8 (16.2)	−1.5 (29.3)	4.7 (40.5)	12.1 (53.8)	16.9 (62.4)	12.9 (55.2)	7.1 (44.8)	−1.6 (29.1)	−9.5 (14.9)	−15.5 (4.1)	−16.1 (3.0)
Average precipitation mm (inches)	8.9 (0.35)	13.8 (0.54)	17.5 (0.69)	34.3 (1.35)	56.6 (2.23)	96.6 (3.80)	197.5 (7.78)	173.3 (6.82)	64.7 (2.55)	28.7 (1.13)	29.2 (1.15)	10.9 (0.43)	732 (28.82)
Average precipitation days (≥ 0.1 mm)	3.0	4.0	4.0	5.6	6.3	7.7	11.8	11.6	7.6	5.2	5.2	3.4	75.4
Average snowy days	2.8	2.5	0.5	0.1	0	0	0	0	0	0	0.7	1.5	8.1
Average relative humidity (%)	57	53	50	53	56	58	74	75	67	60	61	59	60
Mean monthly sunshine hours	142.5	148.5	202.8	228.8	244.7	217.3	196.3	192.5	186.3	184.4	155.8	145.7	2,245.6
Percentage possible sunshine	46	48	54	58	56	50	45	47	51	53	51	48	51
Source: China Meteorological Administration

== Transportation ==
- Zoucheng Railway Station on the Beijing-Shanghai Railway
- Frequent bus service to the nearby Qufu and Yanzhou.

=== Monorail ===
A 12 km (7.5 mi), 12 station monorail to connect Qufu and Zoucheng began construction in the first half of 2017, however construction was halted. A 6.3 km (3.9 mi) section was due to be completed in January 2018 to allow for testing to commence. The complete line was originally due to open in 2018. As of July 2021 the local government hopes to complete the line.
