= Xiangcheng, Zoucheng =

Xiangcheng 香城镇
- Town
- Location in Shandong Xiangcheng (China)
- Coordinates: 35°17′29″N 117°07′52″E
- Country: People's Republic of China
- Province: Shandong
- Prefecture-level city: Jining
- County-level city: Zoucheng
- Time zone: UTC+8 (China Standard)

Xiangcheng (Chinese: 香城镇) is a town in Zoucheng, Jining, in southwestern Shandong province, China.
