= Tangcun, Shandong =

Tangcun 唐村镇
- Town
- Location in Shandong Tangcun (China)
- Coordinates: 35°19′36″N 116°56′37″E
- Country: People's Republic of China
- Province: Shandong
- Prefecture-level city: Jining
- County-level city: Zoucheng
- Time zone: UTC+8 (China Standard)

Tangcun (Chinese: 唐村镇) is a town in Zoucheng, Jining, in southwestern Shandong province, China.
