= Jining Stadium =

Sports venue in Jining, China

Coordinates: 30°47′12″N 116°34′39″E

- Interactive map of Jining Stadium
- Full name: Jining Stadium
- Location: Jining, China
- Capacity: 34,318

Construction
- Groundbreaking: May 2009
- Opened: 2012

Jining Stadium is a multi-purpose stadium in Jining, China. It is used mostly for football matches. The stadium has a capacity of 34,318. It opened in 2012 and broke ground in 2009.
