= Jiaxiang County =

Jiaxiang County 嘉祥县 Kiasiang; Kiasing
- County
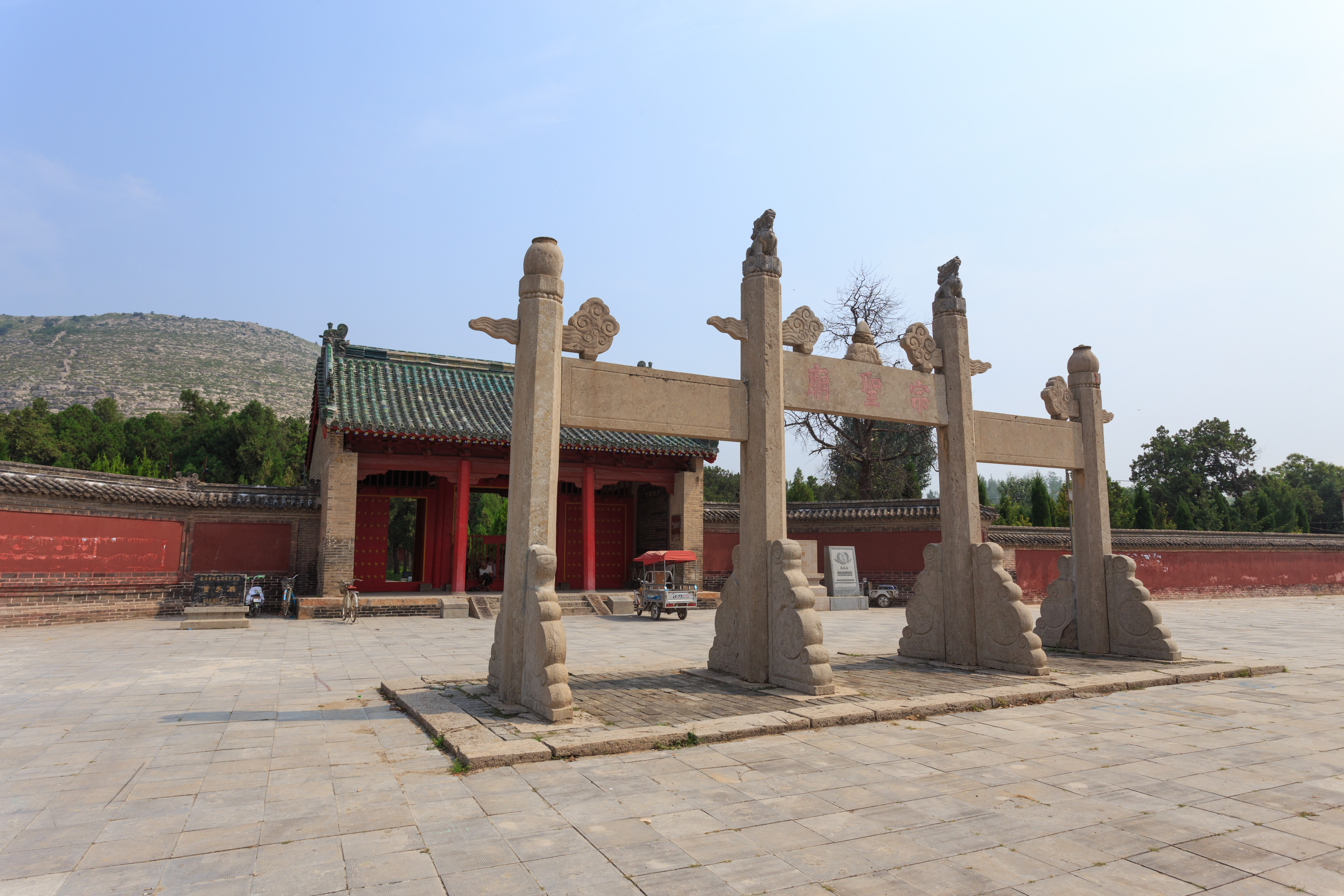
- Temple of Zengzi in Jiaxiang

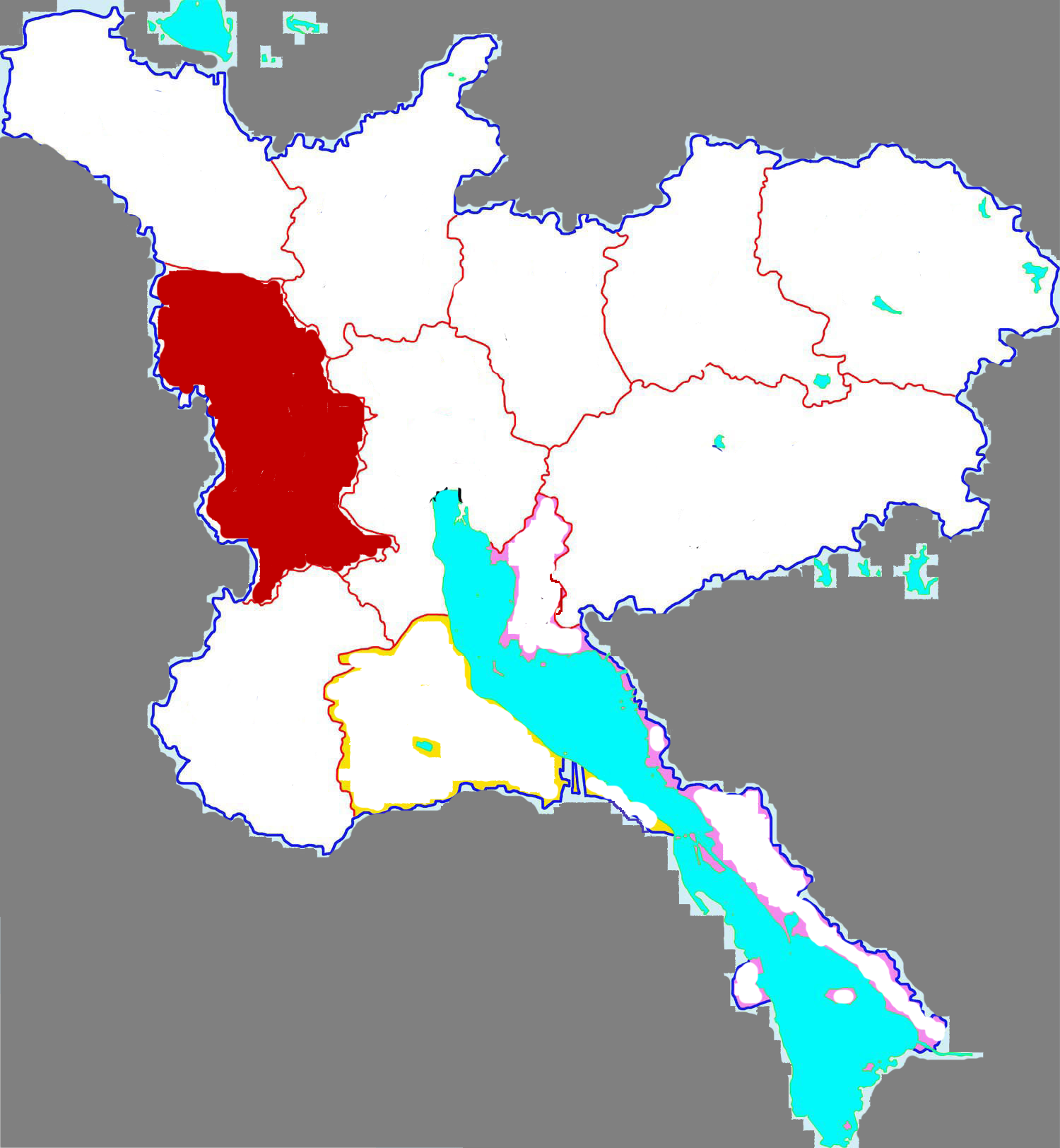
- Location in Jining

- Location of the seat in Shandong
- Coordinates: 35.408°N 116.342°E
- Country: People's Republic of China
- Province: Shandong
- Prefecture-level city: Jining

Area
  - Total: 838.56 km^{2} (323.77 sq mi)
- Elevation: 40 m (130 ft)

Population (2019)
  - Total: 933,614
  - Density: 1,113.4/km^{2} (2,883.6/sq mi)
- Time zone: UTC+8 (China Standard)
- Postal code: 272400
- Website: www.jiaxiang.gov.cn

Jiaxiang County (simplified Chinese: 嘉祥县; traditional Chinese: 嘉祥縣; pinyin: Jiāxiáng Xiàn) is a county in the southwest of Shandong province, People's Republic of China. It is under the administration of Jining City.

The population was 871,920 in 2011.

The cultural heritage site of the Carved Stones in the Tombs of the Wu Family is in this county. In 1961, it was added to the list of national historical and cultural monuments. The county is also home to the temple of Zengzi, a Confucian disciple and philosopher. The Jining Qufu Airport is located in the southern part of the county.

== Administrative divisions ==
As of 2012, this county is divided to 8 towns and 7 townships.

Towns

- Jiaxiang (嘉祥镇)
- Zhifang (纸坊镇)
- Liangbaosi (梁宝寺镇)
- Wolongshan (卧龙山镇)
- Huanggai (黄垓镇)
- Tuanli (疃里镇)
- Macun (马村镇)
- Jintun (金屯镇)
- Dazhanglou (大张楼镇)

Townships

- Laosengtang Township (老僧堂乡)
- Wanzhang Township (万张乡)
- Maji Township (马集乡)
- Mandong Township (满硐乡)
- Zhongshan Township (仲山乡)
- Mengguji Township (孟姑集乡)

== Climate ==
Climate data for Jiaxiang, elevation 37 m (121 ft), (1991–2020 normals, extremes 1981–2010)
Month	Jan	Feb	Mar	Apr	May	Jun	Jul	Aug	Sep	Oct	Nov	Dec	Year
Record high °C (°F)	16.5 (61.7)	23.6 (74.5)	28.1 (82.6)	33.3 (91.9)	37.7 (99.9)	40.3 (104.5)	41.0 (105.8)	36.9 (98.4)	36.0 (96.8)	35.4 (95.7)	26.5 (79.7)	21.0 (69.8)	41.0 (105.8)
Mean daily maximum °C (°F)	4.9 (40.8)	8.9 (48.0)	14.9 (58.8)	21.3 (70.3)	26.8 (80.2)	31.6 (88.9)	32.0 (89.6)	30.7 (87.3)	27.2 (81.0)	21.6 (70.9)	13.4 (56.1)	6.7 (44.1)	20.0 (68.0)
Daily mean °C (°F)	−0.4 (31.3)	3.2 (37.8)	9.2 (48.6)	15.5 (59.9)	21.1 (70.0)	26.1 (79.0)	27.6 (81.7)	26.1 (79.0)	21.5 (70.7)	15.6 (60.1)	7.9 (46.2)	1.5 (34.7)	14.6 (58.3)
Mean daily minimum °C (°F)	−4.6 (23.7)	−1.4 (29.5)	3.9 (39.0)	9.9 (49.8)	15.4 (59.7)	20.9 (69.6)	23.7 (74.7)	22.3 (72.1)	16.9 (62.4)	10.6 (51.1)	3.3 (37.9)	−2.7 (27.1)	9.9 (49.7)
Record low °C (°F)	−16.2 (2.8)	−14.7 (5.5)	−8.8 (16.2)	−3.1 (26.4)	4.3 (39.7)	10.5 (50.9)	16.7 (62.1)	10.8 (51.4)	4.9 (40.8)	−1.1 (30.0)	−10.7 (12.7)	−13.8 (7.2)	−16.2 (2.8)
Average precipitation mm (inches)	7.5 (0.30)	14.1 (0.56)	17.9 (0.70)	35.7 (1.41)	54.2 (2.13)	79.9 (3.15)	173.5 (6.83)	176.1 (6.93)	70.1 (2.76)	31.6 (1.24)	28.5 (1.12)	9.6 (0.38)	698.7 (27.51)
Average precipitation days (≥ 0.1 mm)	2.9	3.9	4.1	5.2	6.3	7.4	10.8	10.7	7.1	5.3	4.9	3.4	72
Average snowy days	2.8	2.6	0.7	0.1	0	0	0	0	0	0	0.8	1.7	8.7
Average relative humidity (%)	65	60	58	62	65	63	77	82	76	70	70	68	68
Mean monthly sunshine hours	137.5	142.0	187.2	212.2	229.2	208.4	182.1	175.3	165.7	170.3	145.2	139.8	2,094.9
Percentage possible sunshine	44	46	50	54	53	48	42	43	45	49	48	46	47
Source: China Meteorological Administration

== Gallery ==
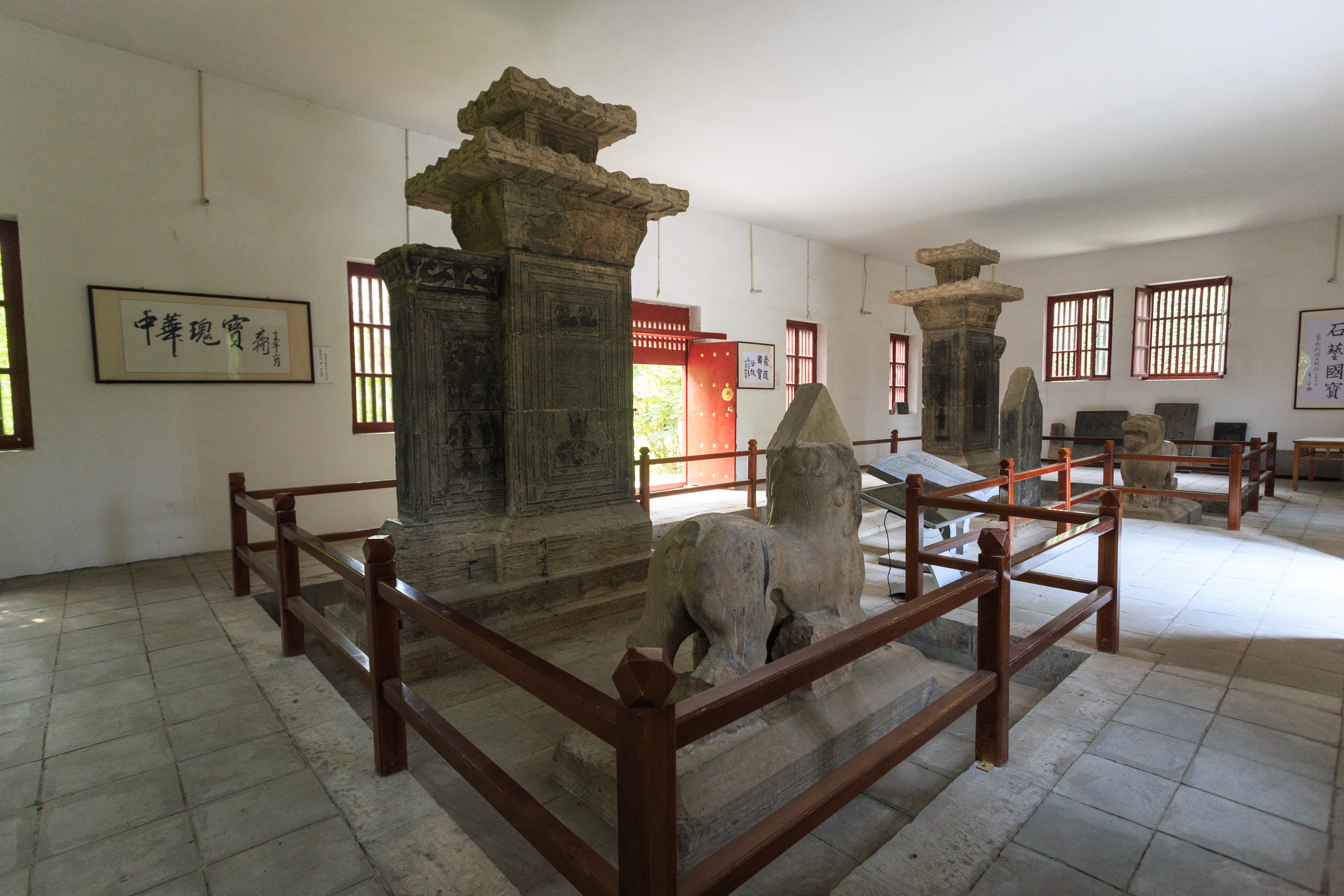
Wu family shrines

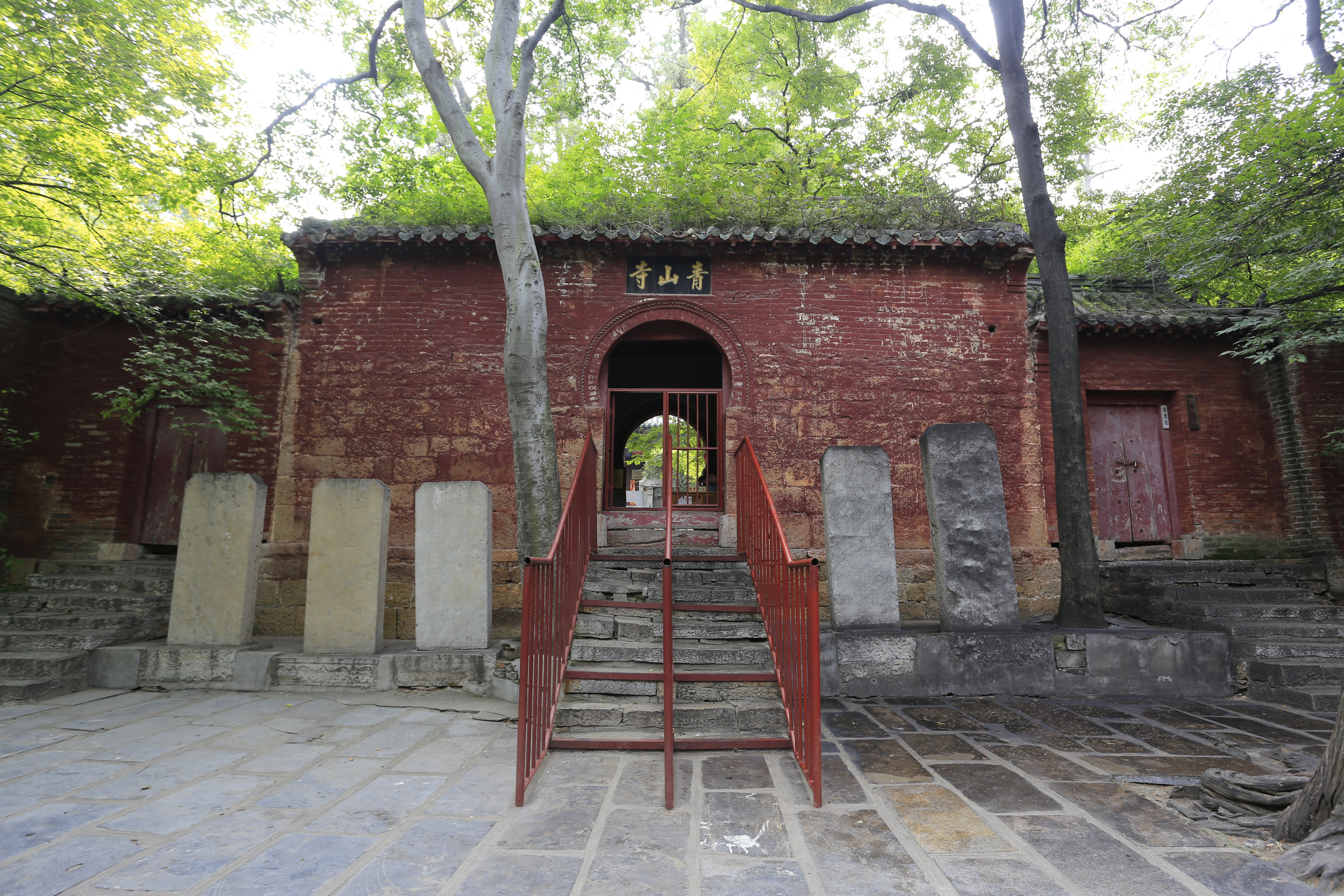
Qingshan Temple
