= Tangcun, Xincai County =

Tangcun 棠村镇
- Town
- Location in Henan
- Coordinates: 32.8668°N 115.0815°E
- Country: China
- Province: Henan
- Prefecture-level city: Zhumadian
- County: Xincai County

Area
  - Total: 59.6 km^{2} (23.0 sq mi)

Population
  - Total: 59,000
  - Density: 990/km^{2} (2,600/sq mi)
- Time zone: UTC+8 (China Standard)

Tangcun, Xincai County
- Traditional Chinese: 棠邨鎮
- Simplified Chinese: 棠村镇
Transcriptions
Standard Mandarin
- Hanyu Pinyin: Tángcūn Zhèn

Tangcun (simplified Chinese: 棠村; traditional Chinese: 棠邨; pinyin: Tángcūn) is a town in Xincai County, Zhumadian Prefecture, Henan Province, China.
