= Jining =

Jining 济宁市 Tsining
- Prefecture-level city
- Jining City
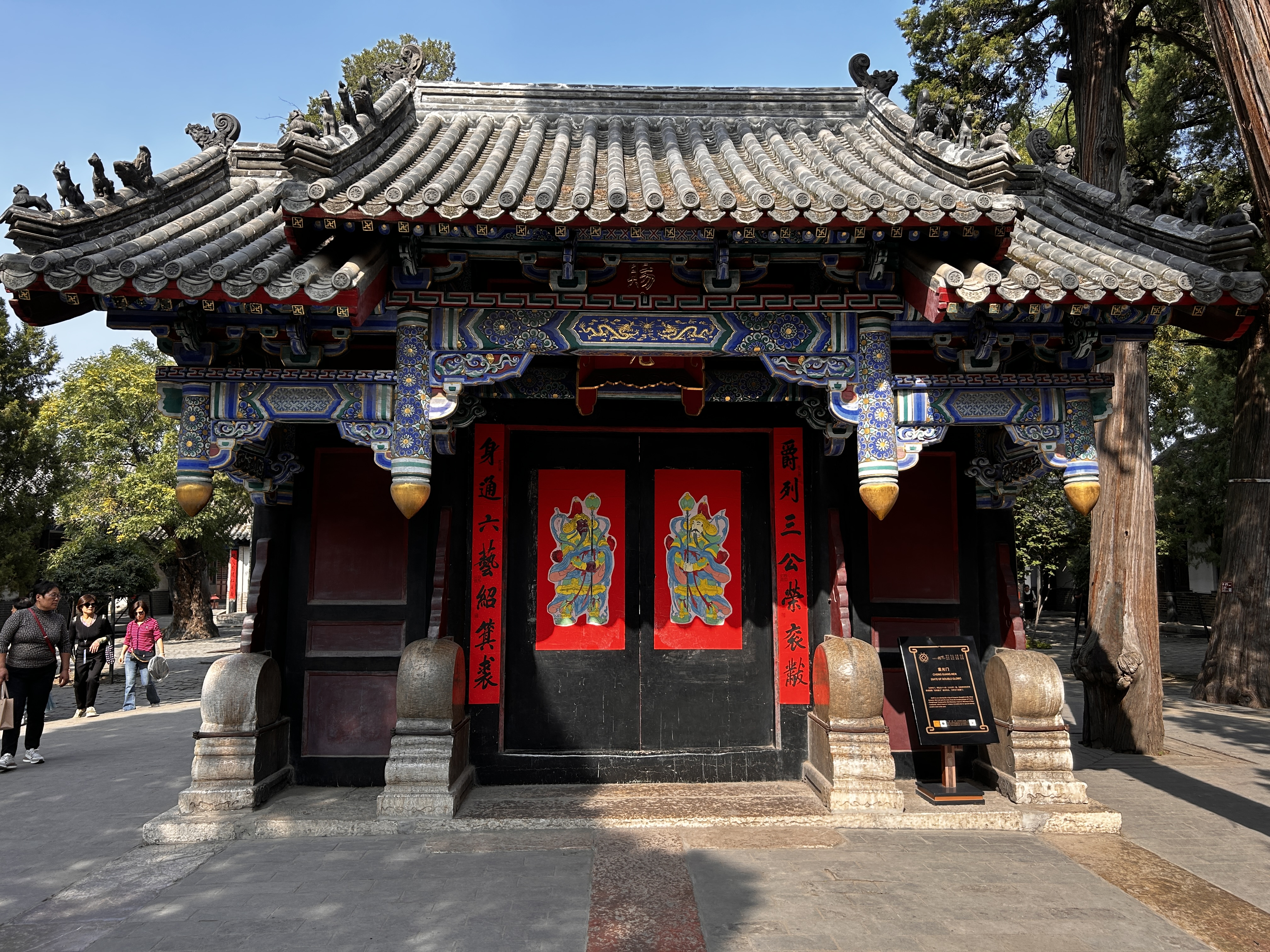
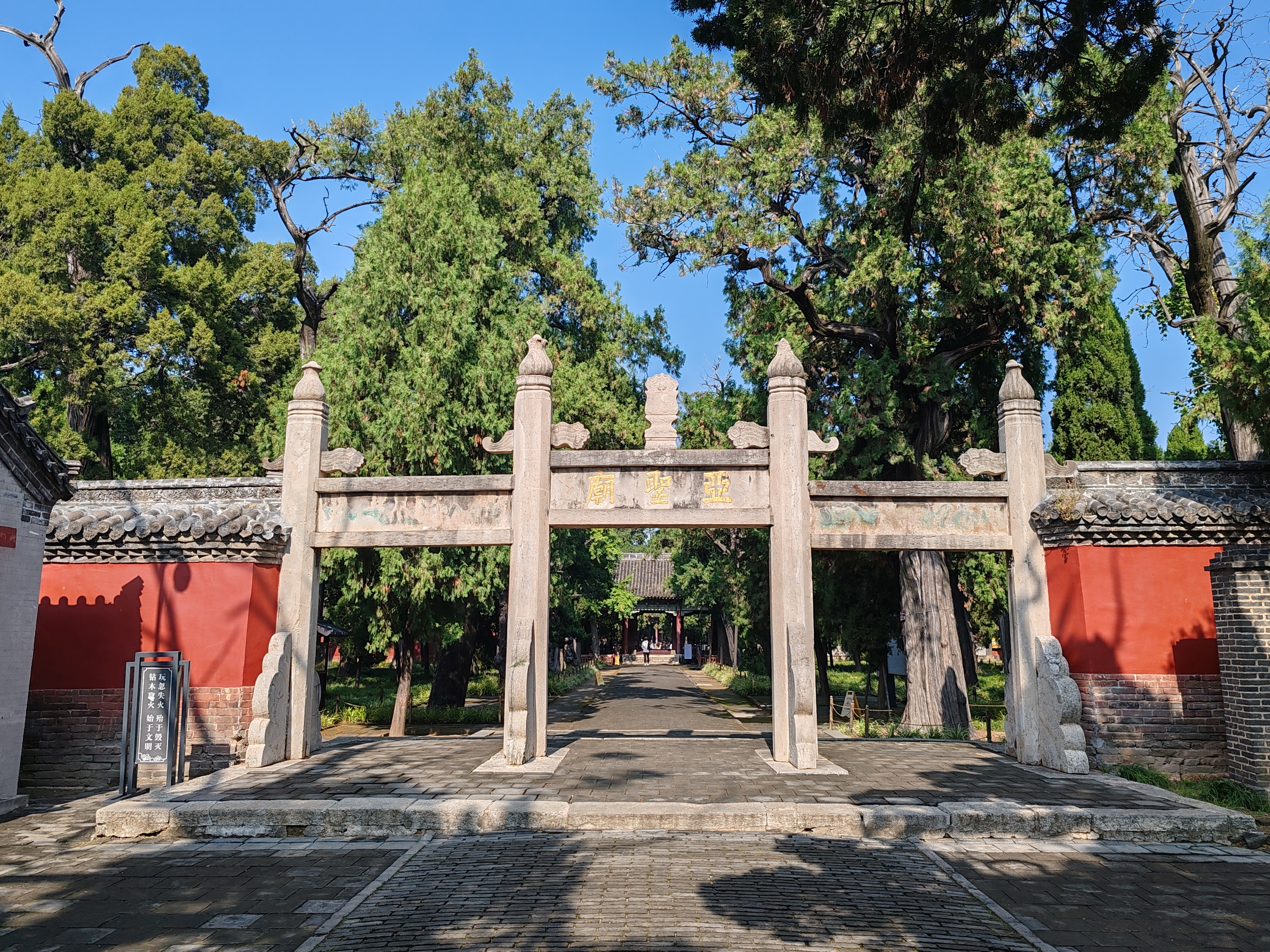
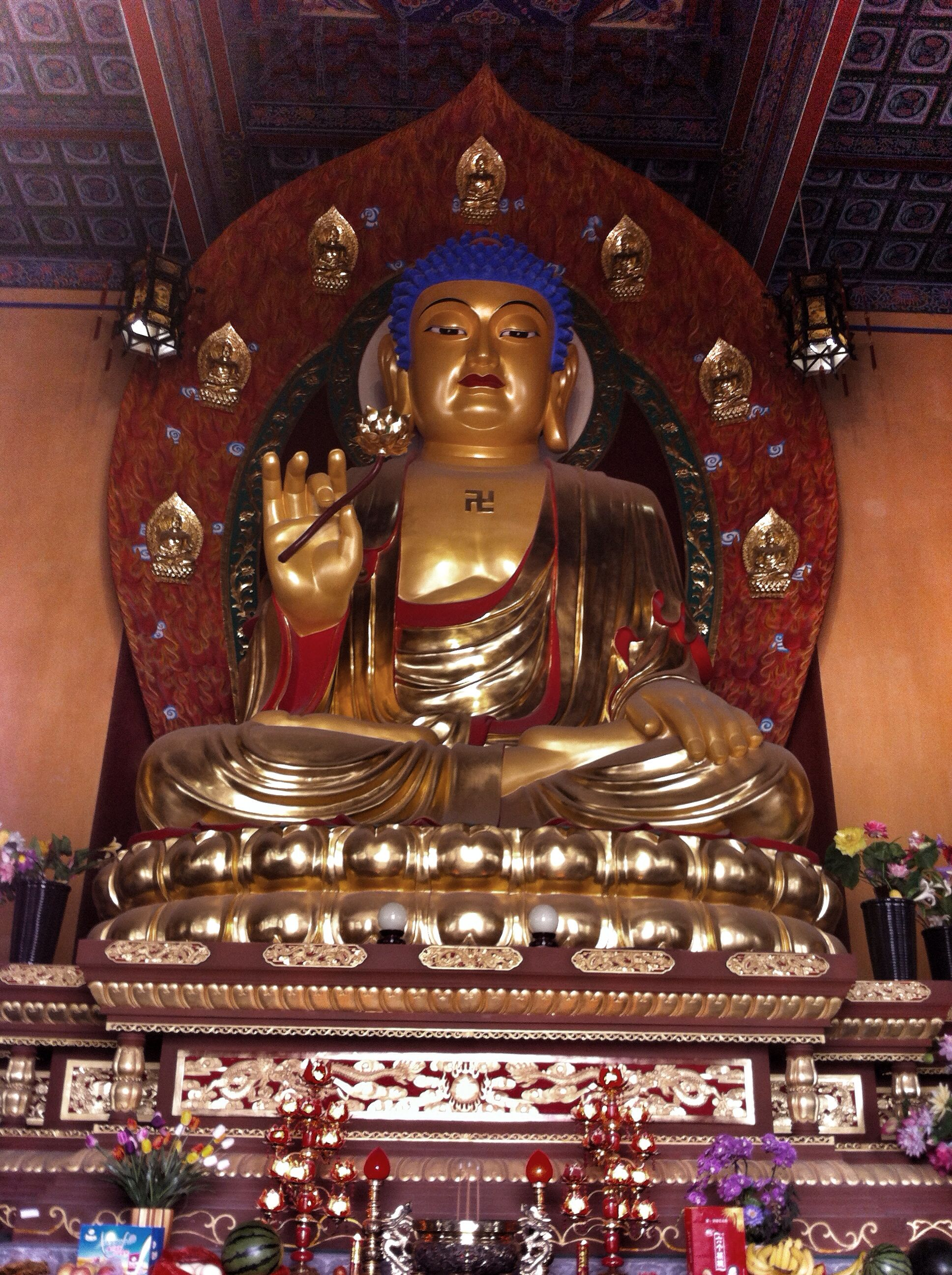
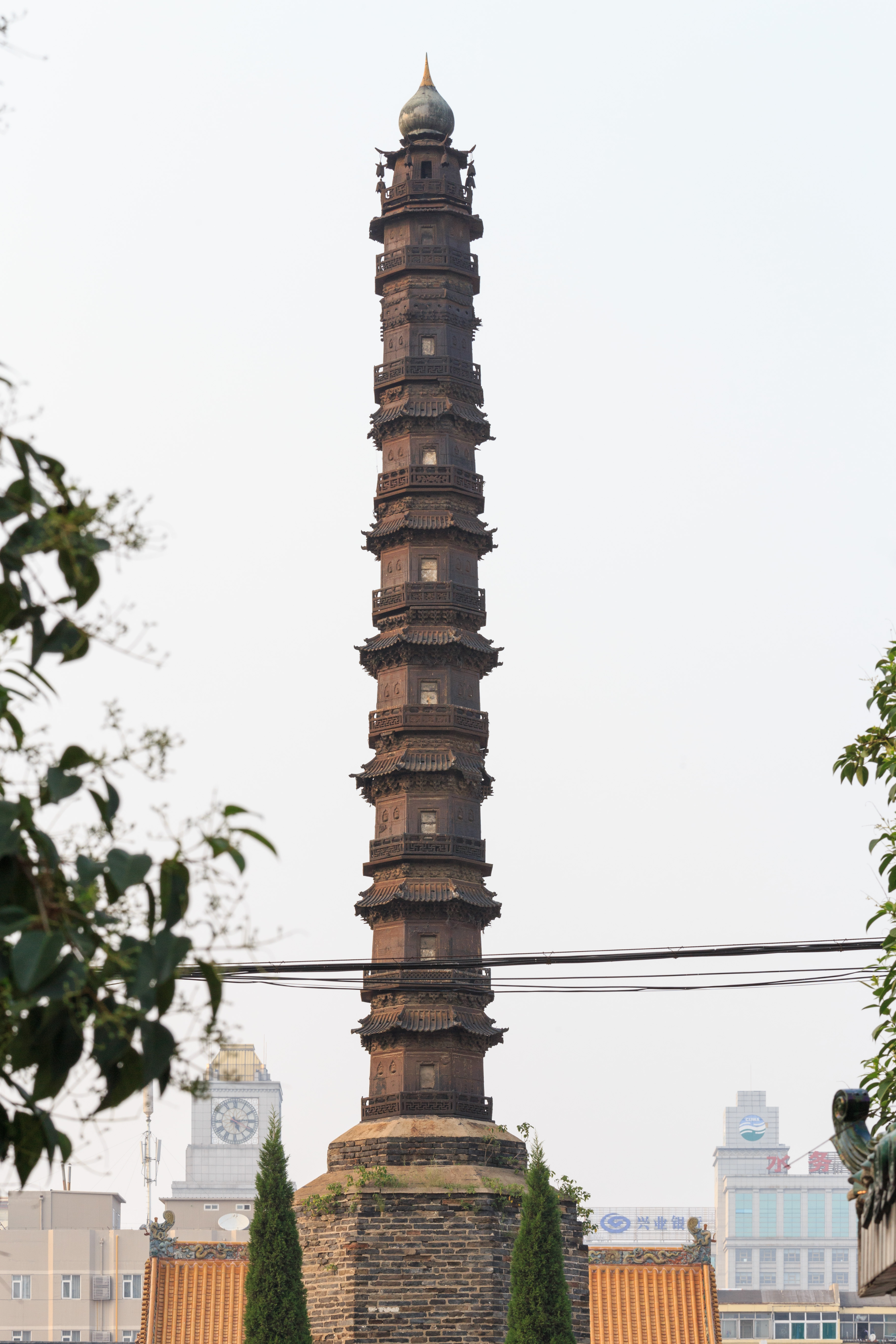
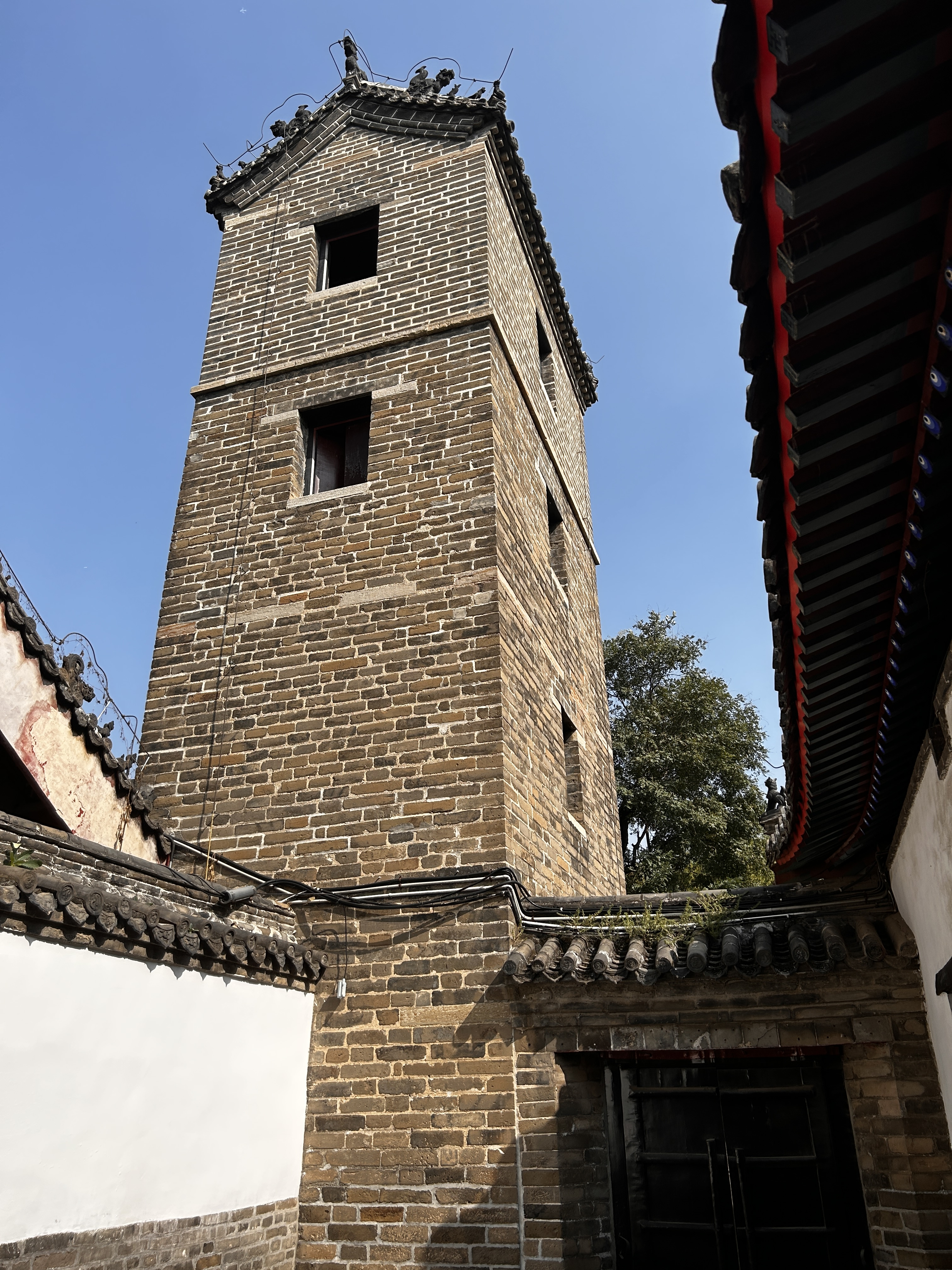
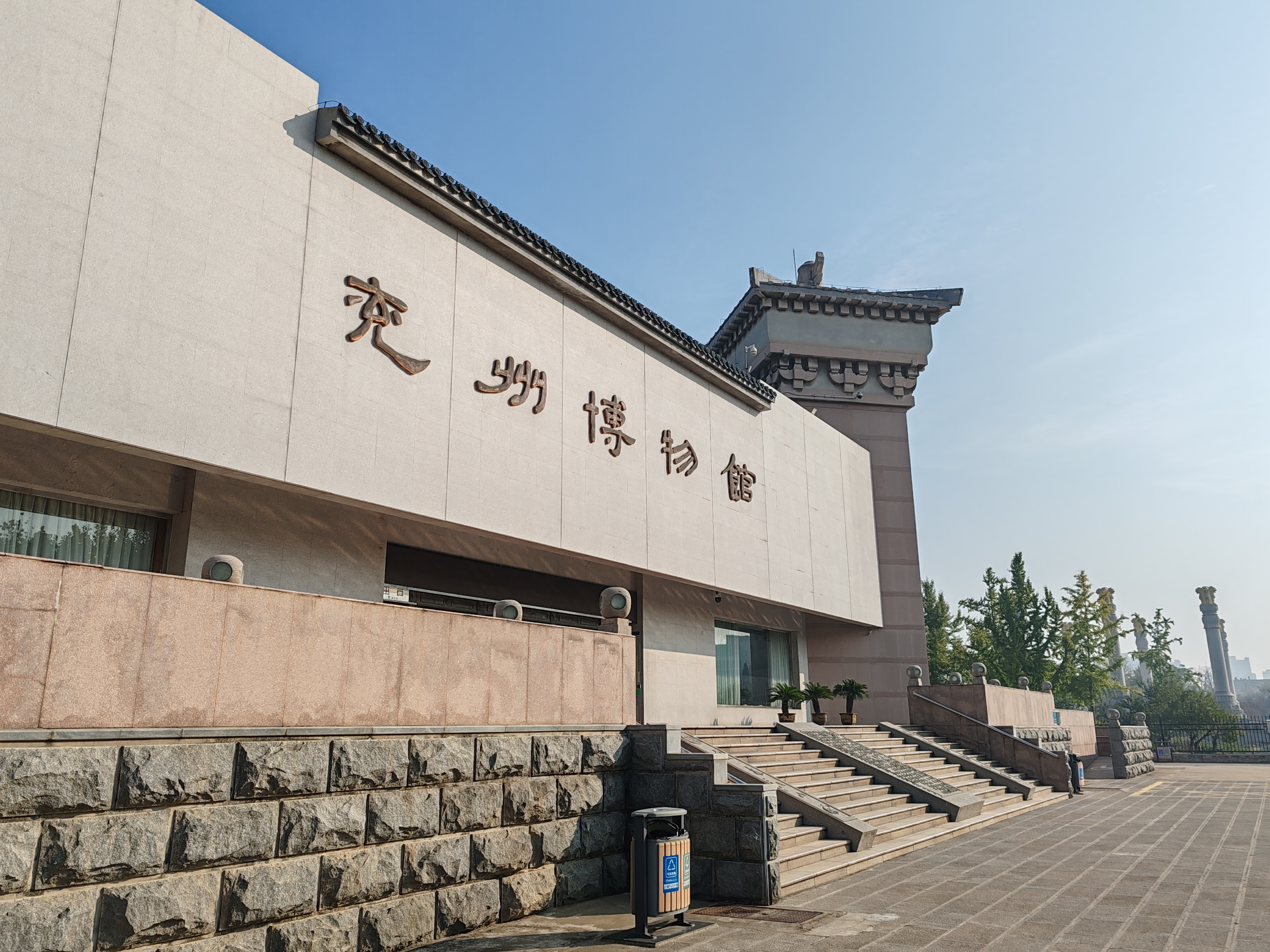
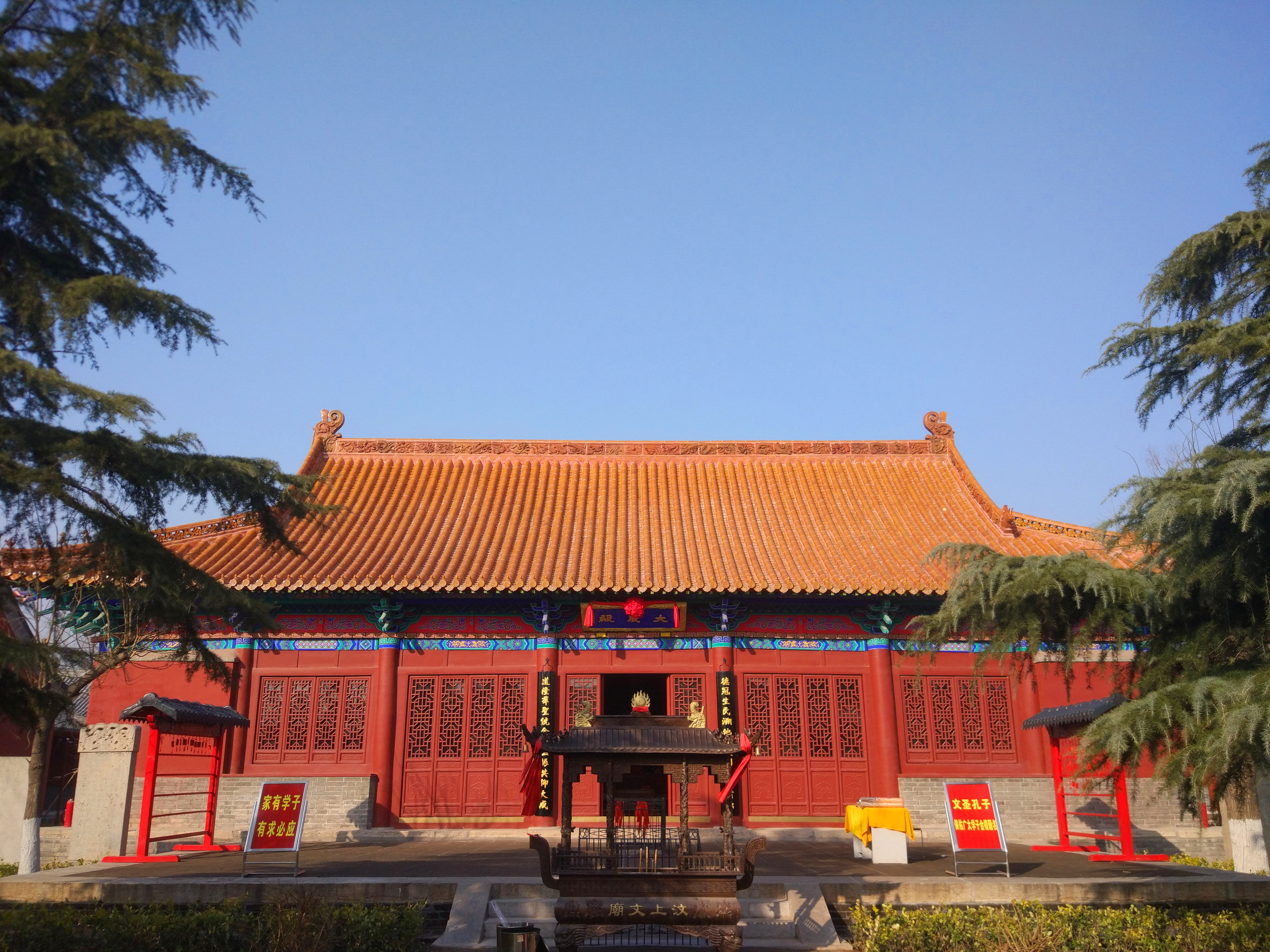
- Qufu Zoucheng Baoxiang Temple Chongjue Iron Pagoda Kong Family Mansion Yanzhou Wenshang
- Nickname: Hometown of Confucius and Mencius (孔孟之乡)
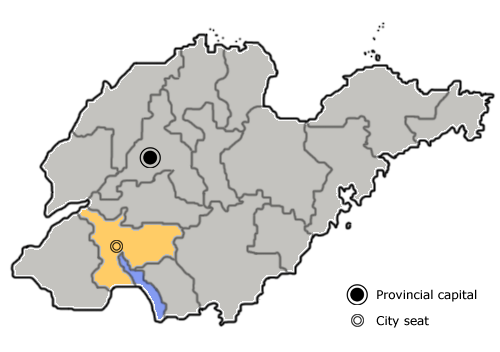
- Location of Jining in Shandong
- Interactive map of Jining
- Coordinates (Jining municipal government): 35°24′54″N 116°35′14″E
- Country: People's Republic of China
- Province: Shandong
- County-level divisions: 12
- Municipal seat: Rencheng District

Government
  - CCP Committee Secretary: Wen Jinrong (温金荣)
  - Mayor: Zhang Haibo (张海波) Acting

Area
  - Prefecture-level city: 11,186.97 km^{2} (4,319.31 sq mi)
  - Urban: 1,534.2 km^{2} (592.4 sq mi)
  - Metro: 884 km^{2} (341 sq mi)

Population (2010 census)
  - Prefecture-level city: 8,081,905
  - Density: 722.4391/km^{2} (1,871.109/sq mi)
  - Urban: 1,859,406
  - Urban density: 1,212.0/km^{2} (3,139.0/sq mi)
  - Metro: 1,518,000
  - Metro density: 1,720/km^{2} (4,450/sq mi)

GDP
  - Prefecture-level city: CN¥ 493 billion US$ 74.5 billion
  - Per capita: CN¥ 58,972; US$ 8,912
- Time zone: UTC+8 (China Standard)
- Postal code: 272000
- Area code: 0537
- ISO 3166 code: CN-SD-08
- License Plate Prefix: 鲁H

Jining (Chinese: 济宁; pinyin: Jǐníng) is a prefecture-level city in southwestern Shandong province. It borders Heze to the southwest, Zaozhuang to the southeast, Tai'an to the northeast, and the provinces of Henan and Jiangsu to the northwest and south respectively. Jining, which is located directly to the north of Lake Nanyang (Chinese: 南阳湖; pinyin: Nányáng Hú), is today the northernmost city reachable by navigation on the Grand Canal of China making it an important inland port.

Its population was 8,081,905 at the 2010 census, of whom 1,518,000 lived in the built-up (or metro) area made up of Rencheng urban district on 884 km^{2} (341 sq mi), Yanzhou district not being totally conurbated yet.

== History ==
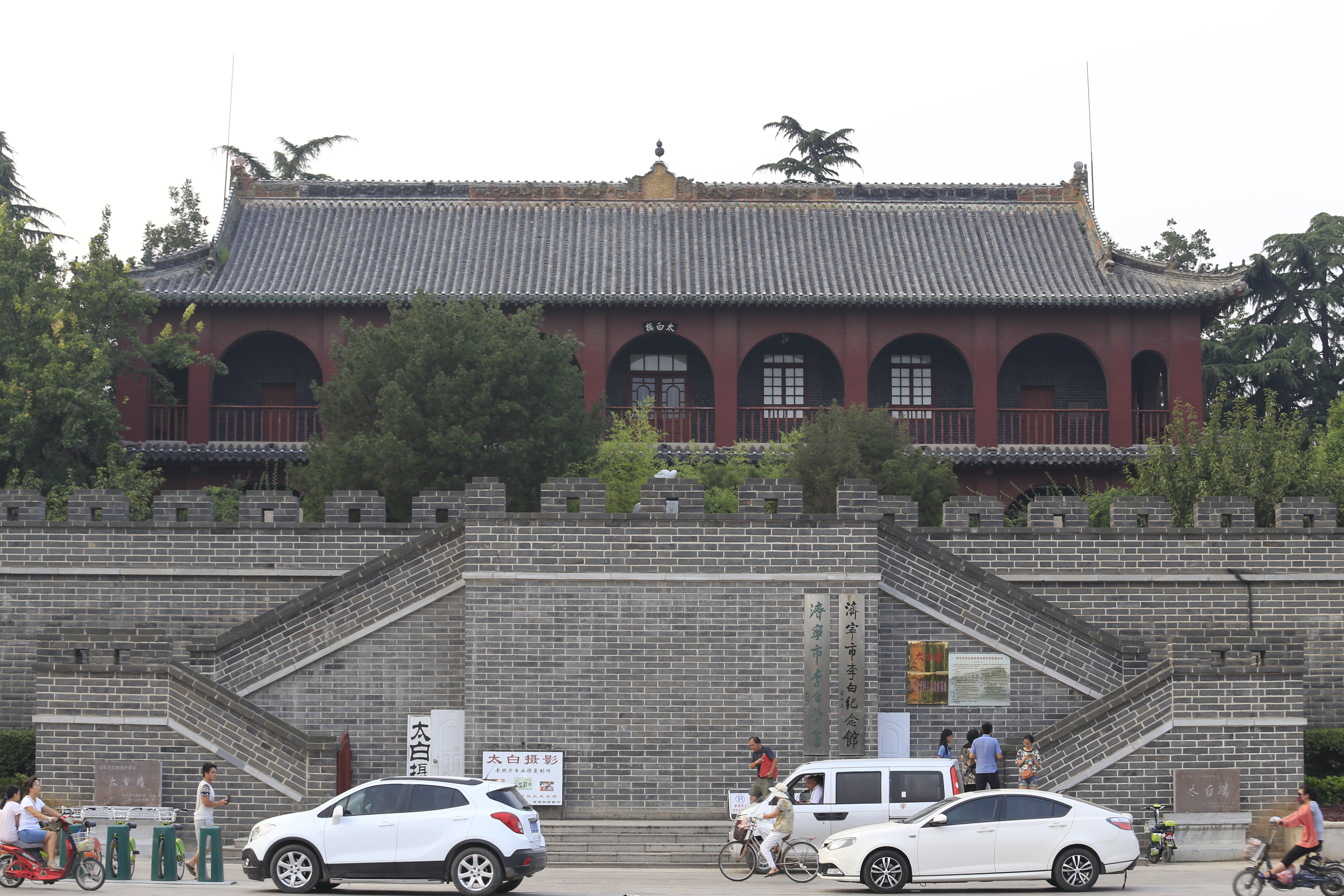
Taibai Lou, a memorial for Li Bai.

The name Jining was first given to the region in the year 1271 during the Song dynasty, although the exact area and type of administrative district it refers to have varied over the centuries. Jining has several distinctive associations in Chinese history and culture, as in antiquity it was the birthplace and home of Confucius, along with many of his more famous disciples, including Mencius. Temples to a number of these philosophers still exist in various parts of the prefecture. Liangshan, a county of Jining, is also famous as the principal setting of the Chinese literary classic, Water Margin.

== Administration ==
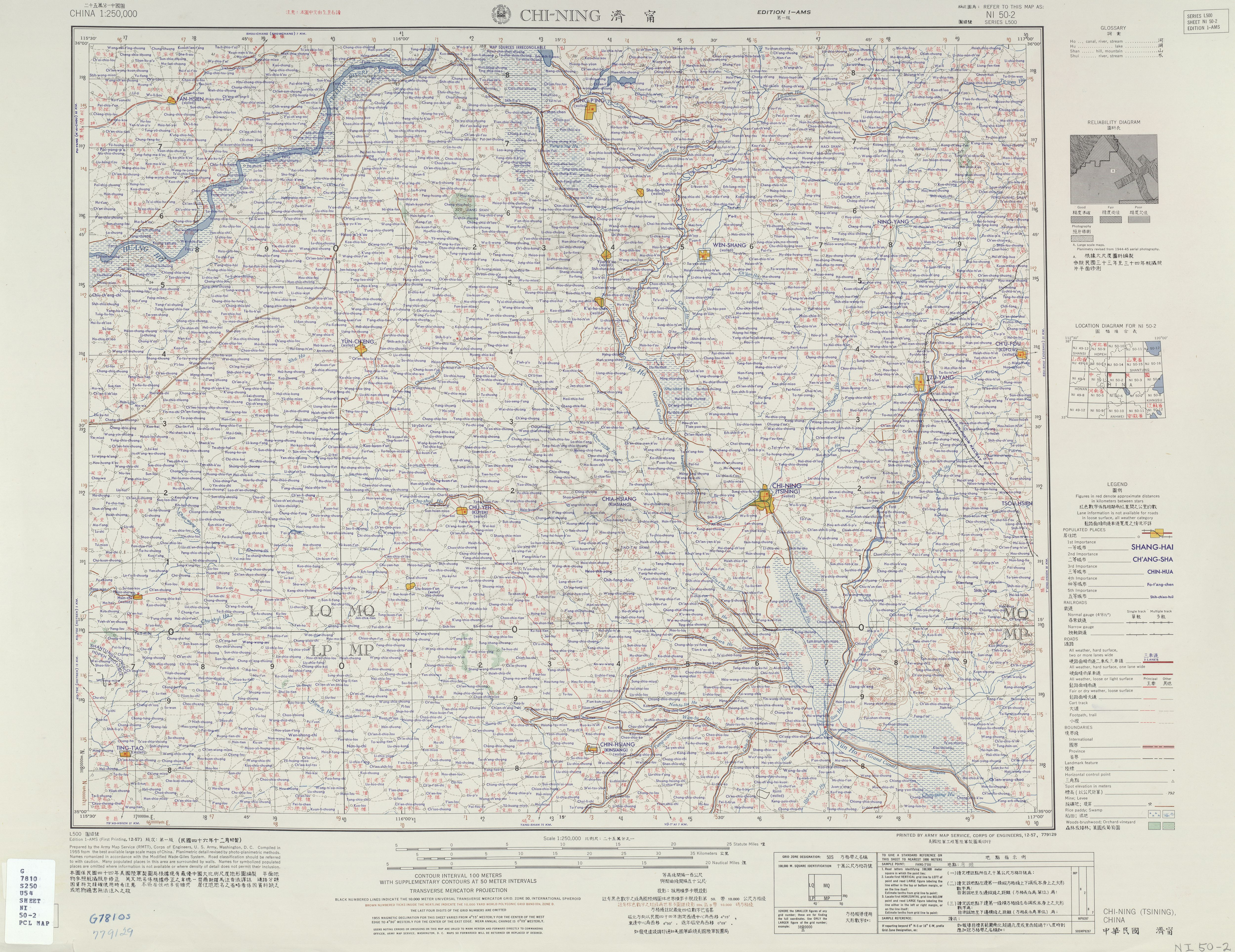
Map including Jining (labeled as CHI-NING (TSINING) (walled) 濟寗) (AMS, 1954)

The prefecture-level city of Jining administers 11 county-level divisions, including two districts, two county-level cities and seven counties.

- Rencheng District (任城区)
- Yanzhou District (兖州区)
- Qufu City (曲阜市)
- Zoucheng City (邹城市)
- Weishan County (微山县)
- Yutai County (鱼台县) - originally in Huxi prefecture
- Jinxiang County (金乡县) - originally in Huxi
- Jiaxiang County (嘉祥县) - originally in Huxi
- Wenshang County (汶上县)
- Sishui County (泗水县)
- Liangshan County (梁山县)

Map
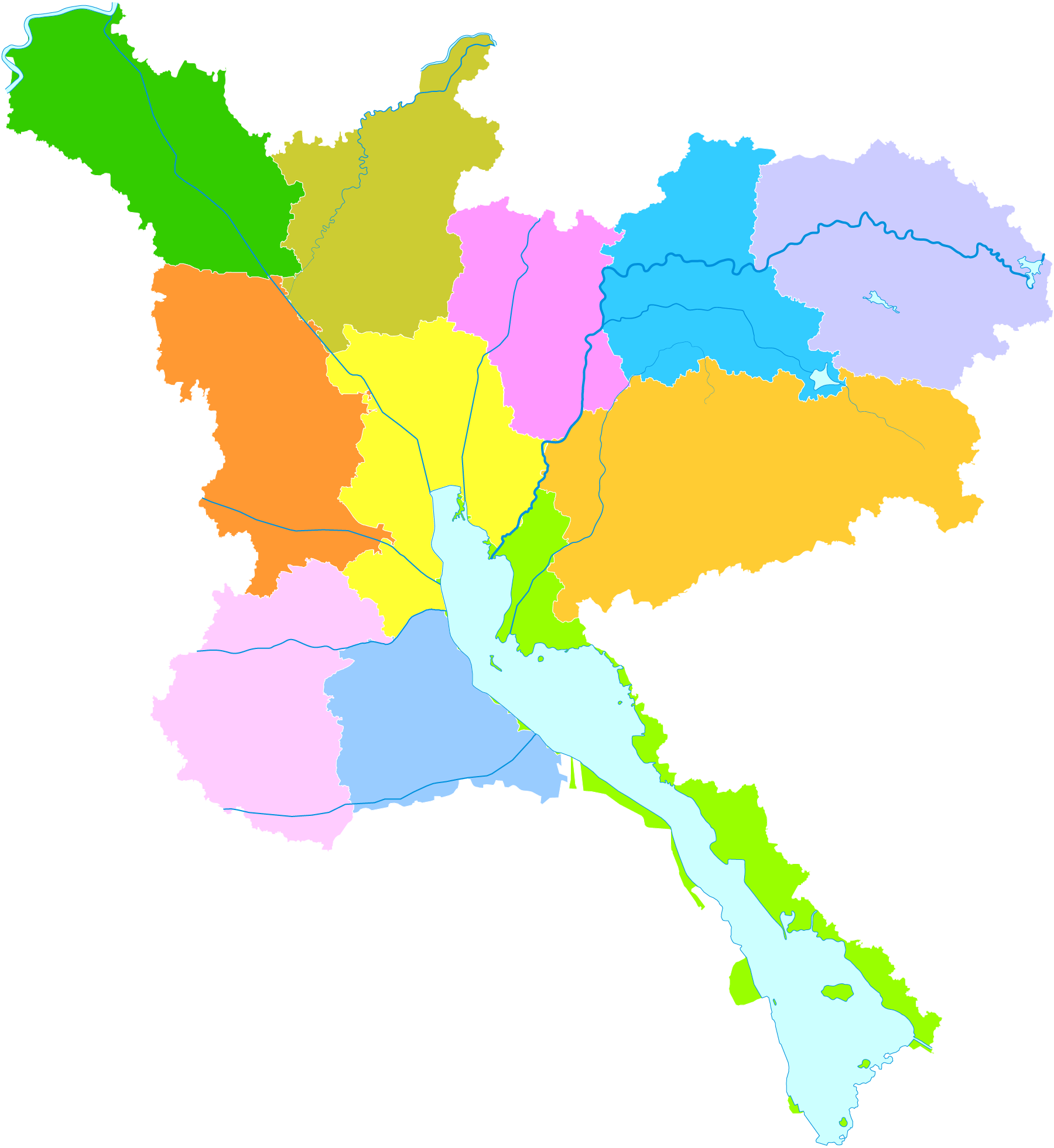

== Climate ==
Jining City is located in the East Asian monsoon climate zone, a warm temperate monsoon climate with four distinct seasons. In summer, there are many southerly winds, influenced by tropical oceanic air masses or degenerate tropical oceanic air masses, with high temperatures and heavy rains; in winter, there are many northerly winds, influenced by polar continental air masses, with sunny and cold weather; spring and autumn are the periods of adjustment of atmospheric circulation, with drought and wind in the spring, and quick warming; autumn is cool, but with occasional rains and cloudy conditions.Having abundant light energy resources is a prominent feature of Jining's climate. The average annual temperature in Jining is 13.3–14.1 °C (55.9–57.4 °F), and the average frost-free period is 199 days. The average annual precipitation is around 597–820 millimetres (23.5–32.3 in).

Climate data for Jining, elevation 33 m (108 ft), (1991–2020 normals, extremes 1981–2010)
Month	Jan	Feb	Mar	Apr	May	Jun	Jul	Aug	Sep	Oct	Nov	Dec	Year
Record high °C (°F)	16.2 (61.2)	22.3 (72.1)	27.6 (81.7)	32.8 (91.0)	37.5 (99.5)	39.0 (102.2)	40.8 (105.4)	37.1 (98.8)	36.3 (97.3)	34.6 (94.3)	25.5 (77.9)	19.7 (67.5)	40.8 (105.4)
Mean daily maximum °C (°F)	5.0 (41.0)	8.9 (48.0)	14.8 (58.6)	21.5 (70.7)	27.0 (80.6)	31.4 (88.5)	32.1 (89.8)	30.9 (87.6)	27.3 (81.1)	21.6 (70.9)	13.5 (56.3)	6.8 (44.2)	20.1 (68.1)
Daily mean °C (°F)	0.0 (32.0)	3.5 (38.3)	9.4 (48.9)	15.9 (60.6)	21.5 (70.7)	26.1 (79.0)	27.7 (81.9)	26.3 (79.3)	21.9 (71.4)	15.8 (60.4)	8.2 (46.8)	1.9 (35.4)	14.9 (58.7)
Mean daily minimum °C (°F)	−4.0 (24.8)	−0.9 (30.4)	4.4 (39.9)	10.6 (51.1)	16.2 (61.2)	21.1 (70.0)	23.9 (75.0)	22.6 (72.7)	17.4 (63.3)	10.9 (51.6)	3.9 (39.0)	−2.0 (28.4)	10.3 (50.6)
Record low °C (°F)	−16.2 (2.8)	−14.3 (6.3)	−8.9 (16.0)	−1.5 (29.3)	4.5 (40.1)	11.8 (53.2)	16.0 (60.8)	12.5 (54.5)	5.3 (41.5)	−1.7 (28.9)	−9.9 (14.2)	−14.0 (6.8)	−16.2 (2.8)
Average precipitation mm (inches)	7.5 (0.30)	12.9 (0.51)	16.6 (0.65)	38.4 (1.51)	52.0 (2.05)	80.0 (3.15)	166.7 (6.56)	173.2 (6.82)	66.5 (2.62)	32.4 (1.28)	29.0 (1.14)	10.0 (0.39)	685.2 (26.98)
Average precipitation days (≥ 0.1 mm)	2.7	3.8	3.9	5.6	6.2	7.7	11.1	10.8	7.3	5.2	5.0	3.3	72.6
Average snowy days	2.8	2.5	0.5	0.1	0	0	0	0	0	0	0.7	1.6	8.2
Average relative humidity (%)	62	58	55	59	61	62	76	79	74	68	69	65	66
Mean monthly sunshine hours	151.2	154.9	205.5	230.9	251.7	228.0	192.5	188.6	190.0	188.9	160.7	153.0	2,295.9
Percentage possible sunshine	48	50	55	59	58	53	44	46	52	55	53	51	52
Source: China Meteorological Administration

== Economy ==
Jining is situated in a coal mining area in the southwest of Shandong. An industrial city, Jining has a coal-fired power station, the Jining Power Plant. The city is served by Jining Da'an Airport.

In 2022, Jining's Gross Regional Product (GRP) finished at 531.69 billion yuan, a year-on-year growth of 4.4%.

== Sports ==
Jining Stadium opened in 2012.

== Notable people ==
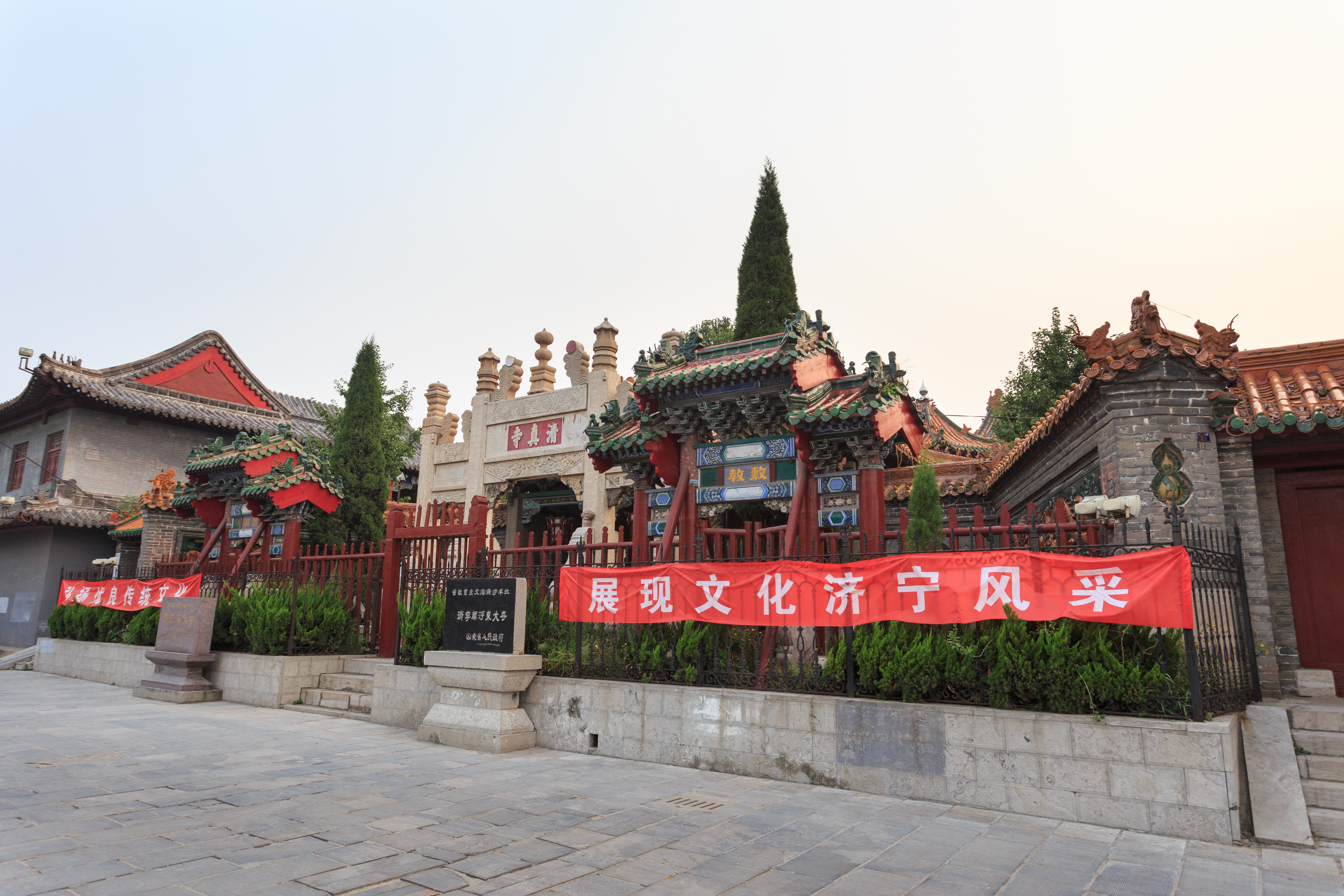
Jining Dongdasi Mosque

- Confucius (551 – 479 BC), central Chinese thinker, founder of Confucianism (main temple and tomb in Qufu)
- Zengzi (505 BC - 436 BC), Chinese philosopher and author, principal lineage protector and promoter of Confucianism
- Mencius (372 – 289 BC), Chinese thinker, a principal interpreter of Confucianism (main temple in Zoucheng)
- Yan Hui (521 BC - 490 BC), one of the famous disciples of Confucius (temple in Qufu)
- Lu Ban (507–440 BC), Chinese engineer, philosopher, inventor, military thinker
- Zuo Qiuming (5th century BC), Chinese court writer of the State of Lu, and contemporary of Confucius during the Spring and Autumn period.
- Kong Shangren (1648–1718), a Chinese Qing Dynasty dramatist and poet best known for his chuanqi play The Peach-Blossom Fan
- Jozef Freinademetz, (1852-1908) , SVD, priest, missionary to China, saint of the Catholic Church
- Pan Xiaoting (1982–), the first professional pool player from China to play full-time on the WPBA Tour.
- Xiong Jingnan (1988–), the first ever Chinese World Champion in mixed martial arts history.
- Wei Zheming (1990-), Chinese actor and singer.

== Sister cities ==
- Ashikaga, Tochigi, Japan (1984)
- Lawton, Oklahoma, United States (1995)
- Mulhouse, Haut-Rhin, France (1996)
- Komatsu, Ishikawa, Japan (2008)
- Taganrog, Rostov Oblast, Russia (2009)
- Osasco, São Paulo, Brazil (2010)
- Fort Smith, Arkansas, United States (2012)
- Angra do Heroísmo, Açores, Portugal (2015)
- Springfield, Illinois, United States (2019)
- Passi, Iloilo, Philippines (2019)
