= Jingdong Circuit =

Song dynasty division of China

- Traditional Chinese: 京東路
- Simplified Chinese: 京东路
- Literal meaning: "East of the Capital" Circuit
Transcriptions
Standard Mandarin
- Hanyu Pinyin: Jīngdōng Lù

Jingdong Circuit or Jingdong Province was one of the major circuits during the Song dynasty.

In 977, the Guangji Army was established. In 979, parts of Cao, Chan, Pu, and Ji were carved out, counties were re-established, and placed under the jurisdiction of Guangji Army. In 1071, Guangji Army was abolished, and Dingtao County was placed under Cao Prefecture. In 1073, the Jingdong Circuit was officially divided into Jingdong East Circuit and Jingdong West Circuit. The boundary between the two circuits was set at present-day Mount Tai and the Yi River. The administrative seat of Jingdong East Circuit was located in Qizhou (now Jinan), while that of Jingdong West Circuit was in Yanzhou, later moved to Yingtian Fu (now Shangqiu).

In 1127, the Northern song was eliminated by Jin dynasty, during Jin dynasty, two parts of Jingdong Circuit were renamed Shandong East Circuit and Shandong West Circuit.

== Administrative regions ==
Its administrative area corresponds to roughly the modern provinces of Shandong, northeastern Henan and northwestern Jiangsu.

Prefecture	Modern location	Description
East Circuit
Qizhou (capital)	Jinan	Administered five counties: Licheng, Yucheng, Zhangqiu, Changqing, Linyi.
Qingzhou	Qingzhou	Administered six counties: Yidu, Shouguang, Linqu, Boxing, Qiancheng, Linzi.
Mizhou	Zhucheng	Administered five counties: Zhucheng, Anqiu, Ju, Gaomi, Jiaoxi.
Yizhou	Linyi	Administered five counties: Linyi, Cheng, Yishui, Fei, Xintai.
Dengzhou	Yantai	Administered four counties: Penglai, Wendeng, Huang, Muping.
Laizhou	Laizhou	Administered four counties: Ye, Laiyang, Jiaoshui, Jimo.
Weizhou	Weifang	Administered three counties: Beihai, Changyi, Changle.
Zizhou	Zibo	Administered four counties: Zichuan, Changshan, Zouping, Gaoyuan.
West Circuit
Songzhou (capital)	Shangqiu	Administered six counties: Ningling, Songcheng, Gushu, Xiayi, Yucheng, Chuqiuxian.
Yanzhou	Yanzhou	Administered seven counties: Xiaqiu (Xia), Fengfu, Sishui, Gongqiu (Gong), Xianyuan (Qufu), Laiwu, Zou.
Xuzhou	Xuzhou	Administered five counties: Pengcheng, Pei, Xiao, Teng, Feng.
Caozhou	Cao	Administered five counties: Jiyin, Wanting (Yuanqu), Chengshi, Nanhua, Dingtao.
Yunzhou	Heze	Administered six counties: Xucheng, Yanggu, Zhongdu, Shouzhang, Dong’e, Pingyin.
Jizhou	Juye	Administered four counties: Juye, Rencheng, Jinxiang, Yuncheng.
Shanzhou	Shan	Administered four counties: Shanfu, Dangshan, Chengwu, Yutai.
Puzhou	Juancheng	Administered four counties: Juancheng, Leize, Linpu, Fan.
Huaiyang Army		Administered two counties: Xiapi, Suqian.
