= Shandong West Circuit =

Province during the Jin dynasty

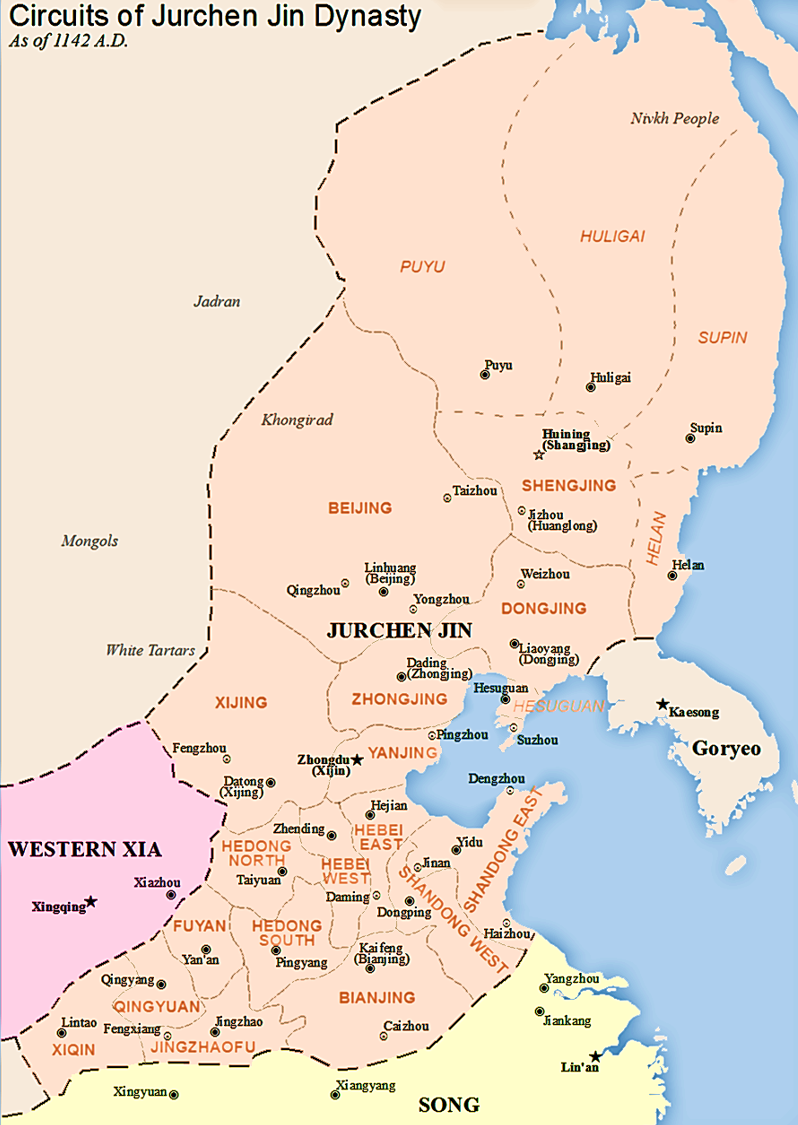
Shandong East Circuit can be seen with in Jin territory

Shandong Western Circuit (山東西路) was an administrative division (circuit, or lu, 路) during the Jurchen Jin dynasty.

After Jin defeated Song in 1127, the territory of the Song dynasty’s Jingdong East Circuit (京東西路) was reorganized and renamed Shandong Western Circuit. Its administrative seat was located at Dongping Prefecture (東平府), corresponding to present-day Dongping County, Shandong Province. This marked the beginning of “Shandong” as a regional name in the context of Chinese administrative geography.

The circuit covered the region south of Mount Tai, north of Chengwu County (成武縣) and Jinxiang County (金鄉縣), west of Mount Meng, east of Liaocheng, Yanggu County (陽穀縣), and Heze, as well as south of Gaotang County (高唐縣); it also included the area west of Pizhou and Siyang County (泗阳縣) in Jiangsu Province, north of the former course of the Yellow River.

The circuit administered the following prefectures and subprefectures:

- Dongpingfu (東平府) – present-day Dongping, Shandong
- Taianzhou (泰安州) – present-day Tai’an, Shandong
- Dezhou (德州) – present-day Ling County, Shandong
- Bozhou (博州) – present-day Liaocheng, Shandong
- Jizhou (濟州) – present-day Jining, Shandong
- Yanzhou (兖州) – present-day Yanzhou, Shandong
- Tengzhou (滕州) – present-day Tengzhou, Shandong
- Xuzhou (徐州) – present-day Xuzhou, Jiangsu
- Pizhou (邳州) – present-day southern Pizhou, Jiangsu

The Shandong Western Circuit was abolished during the Yuan dynasty.
