= 相州 =

相州 may refer to:

- Sagami Province, abbreviated name was Sōshū (相州), province of Japan located in what is today central and western Kanagawa Prefecture
- Xiangzhou, Shandong (相州镇), subdivision of Zhucheng, Shandong
