= Mizhou Subdistrict =

Subdistrict of Zhucheng, Shandong, China

Coordinates: 35.9898°N 119.4025°E

Mizhou Subdistrict (Chinese: 密州街道) is a subdistrict in Zhucheng, Shandong, China. It is named after the historical Mi Prefecture.
