= Mi Zhou =

Mi Zhou may refer to:

- Mi Prefecture, a historical prefecture in modern Shandong, China between the 6th and 14th centuries
- Zhou Mi (badminton) (born 1979), Chinese female badminton player
- Zhou Mi (singer) (born 1986), Chinese recording artist and entertainer
