= Yandian, Yanzhou =

Yandian 颜店镇
- Town
- Location in Shandong Yandian (China)
- Coordinates: 35°33′50″N 116°39′07″E
- Country: People's Republic of China
- Province: Shandong
- Prefecture-level city: Liaocheng
- County-level city: Yanzhou
- Village-level divisions: 66 villages
- Elevation: 47 m (154 ft)
- Time zone: UTC+8 (China Standard)
- Area code: 0537

Yandian (simplified Chinese: 颜店; traditional Chinese: 顏店; pinyin: Yándiàn) is a town under the administration of Yanzhou City in southwestern Shandong province, China, located about 12 kilometres (7.5 mi) west of downtown Yanzhou. As of 2011, it has 66 villages under its administration.

== See also ==
- List of township-level divisions of Shandong
