= Pingyuan Commandery =

Historical commandery of China

Pingyuan Commandery (Chinese: 平原郡) was a historical commandery of China, existing from Han dynasty to Tang dynasty. It was centered around present-day northwestern Shandong province.

The commandery was carved out of the Jibei Kingdom during Emperor Jing of Han's reign. Pingyuan administered 19 counties and marquessates in late Western Han, including Pingyuan (平原), Ge (鬲), Gaotang (高唐), Chongqiu (重丘), Pingchang (平昌), Yu (羽), Ban (般), Leling (樂陵), Zhu'e (祝阿), Yuan (瑗), Eyang (阿陽), Luoyin (漯陰), Li (朸), Fuping (富平), Ande (安德), Heyang (合陽), Louxu (樓虛), Longpou (龍哣), and An (安).

In Eastern Han, Pingyuan twice became a kingdom or principality. It was granted to Liu Sheng (劉勝), son of Emperor He in 106, and to Liu Shuo (劉碩), brother of Emperor Huan in 148. The kingdom was abolished in 206 and Pingyuan was administered as a commandery again. Pingyuan consisted of 9 counties, namely Pingyuan, Gaotang, Ban, Ge, Zhu'e, Leling, Shiyin (濕陰), Ande and Yanci in AD 140. In late Eastern Han, a new principality, Leling, was created, and Leling and Yanci counties were transferred to the new principality.

After Han dynasty, the commandery was successively held by Cao Wei, Jin and Liu Song dynasties. During Emperor Ming of Song's reign, it was conquered by Northern Wei. It was abolished in early Sui dynasty.

In Sui and Tang dynasties, Pingyuan Commandery became the alternative name for De Prefecture. It administered 6 counties in 742: Ande, Changhe (長河), Pingyuan, Pingchang, Jiangling (將陵) and Anling (安陵).

== Population ==
| Dynasty | Western Han | Eastern Han | Western Jin | Liu Song | Northern Wei | Sui dynasty | Tang dynasty |
| Year | 2 | 140 | 280 | 464 | 534 | 609 | 742 |
| Households | 154,387 | 155,588 | 31,000 | 5,913 | 13,939 | 135,822 | 83,211 |
| Population | 664,543 | 1,002,658 | | 29,267 | 40,430 | | 659,855 |
