= Ji Prefecture (Shandong) =

Historical administrative division in Shandong, China

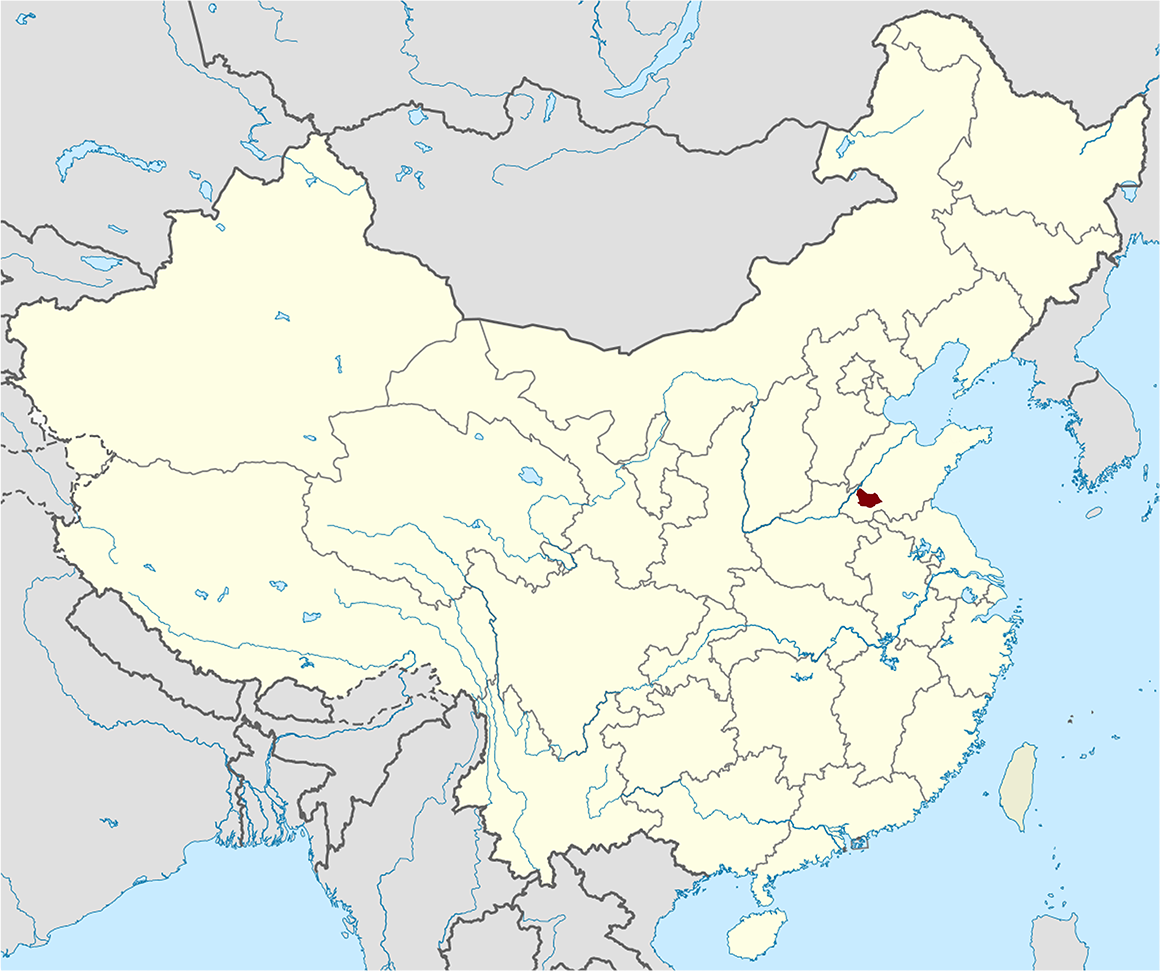
- Traditional Chinese: 濟州
- Simplified Chinese: 济州
Transcriptions
Standard Mandarin
- Hanyu Pinyin: Jì Zhōu
- Wade–Giles: Chi^{4} Chou^{1}

Jizhou or Ji Prefecture was a zhou (prefecture) in imperial China centering on modern Jining, Shandong, China. It existed (intermittently) from 951 until 1348.

== Geography ==
The administrative region of Ji Prefecture in Later Zhou is in modern southwestern Shandong. It probably includes parts of modern:

- Under the administration of Jining:
  - Jining
  - Jinxiang County
- Under the administration of Heze:
  - Juye County
  - Yuncheng County
