= Wei Prefecture (Shandong) =

Historical administrative division in Shandong, China

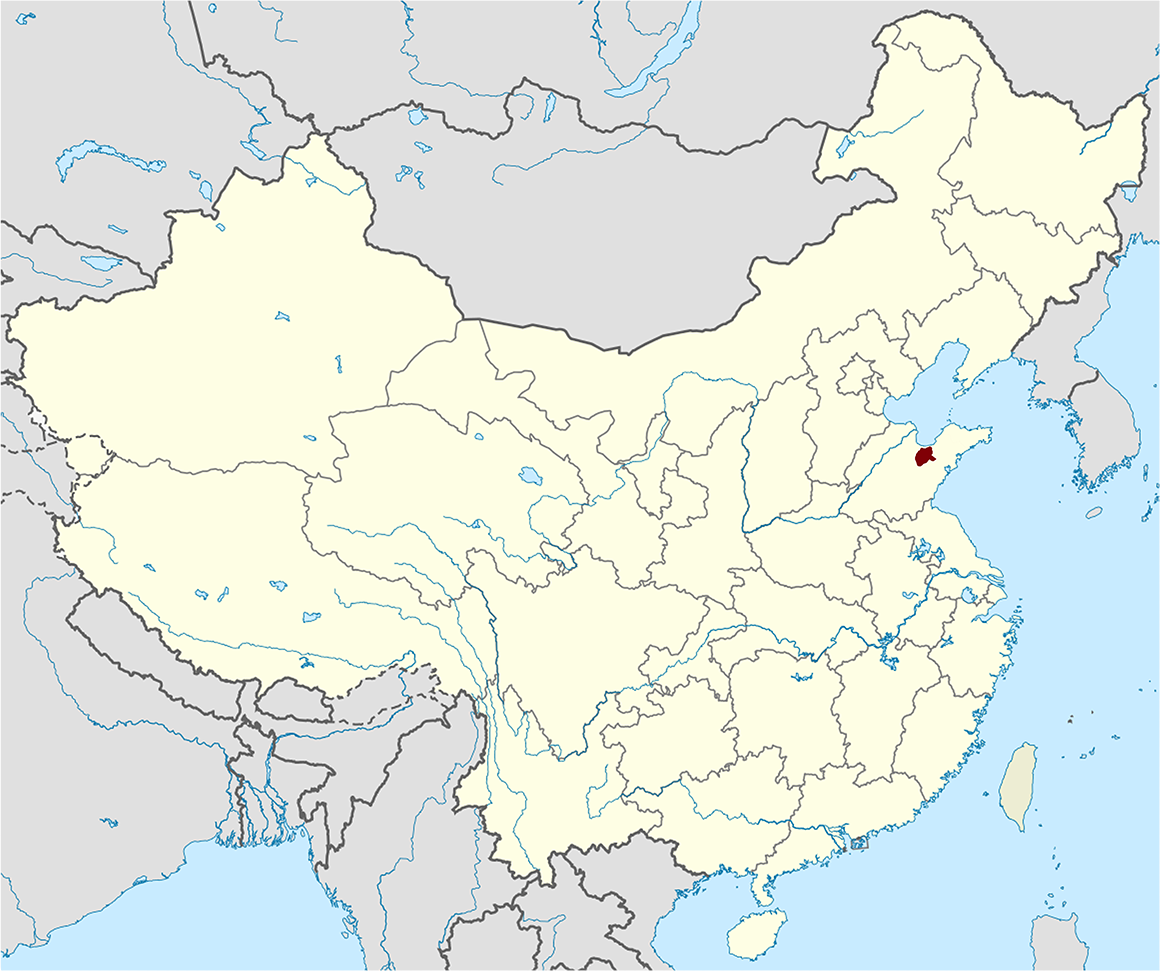
- Traditional Chinese: 濰州
- Simplified Chinese: 潍州
Transcriptions
Standard Mandarin
- Hanyu Pinyin: Wéi Zhōu
- Wade–Giles: Wei^{2} Chou^{1}

Weizhou or Wei Prefecture was a zhou (prefecture) in imperial China centering on modern Weifang, Shandong, China. It existed (intermittently) from 596 until 1376 not long after the founding of the Ming dynasty.
