= De Prefecture =

Historical administrative division of China

- Chinese: 德州
- Literal meaning: Virtuous/Manly Prefecture
Transcriptions
Standard Mandarin
- Hanyu Pinyin: Dé Zhōu
- Wade–Giles: Tê Chou

De Prefecture, also known by its Chinese name De Zhou or Dezhou, was a prefecture (zhou) of imperial China with its eponymous seat at Dezhou, now part of northwestern Shandong Province, China. It existed intermittently from 589 until 1913.

== History ==
In the 9th century, during the late Tang, De Prefecture made up part of the territory of the de facto independent Chengde jiedushis. In the early 10th century, during the Five Dynasties and Ten Kingdoms Era, one of them—Wang Rong—ruled the short-lived Kingdom of Zhao.

== Geography ==
The administrative region of De Prefecture in the Tang dynasty was within modern northern Shandong and southeastern Hebei. It probably included parts of modern:

- Under the administration of Dezhou, Shandong:
  - Dezhou
  - Pingyuan County
- Under the administration of Hengshui, Hebei:
  - Jing County
- Under the administration of Cangzhou, Hebei:
  - Wuqiao County

== See also ==
- Pingyuan Commandery
