= Mi Prefecture =

Historical administrative division in Shandong, China

- Simplified Chinese: 密州
- Hanyu Pinyin: Mì Zhōu
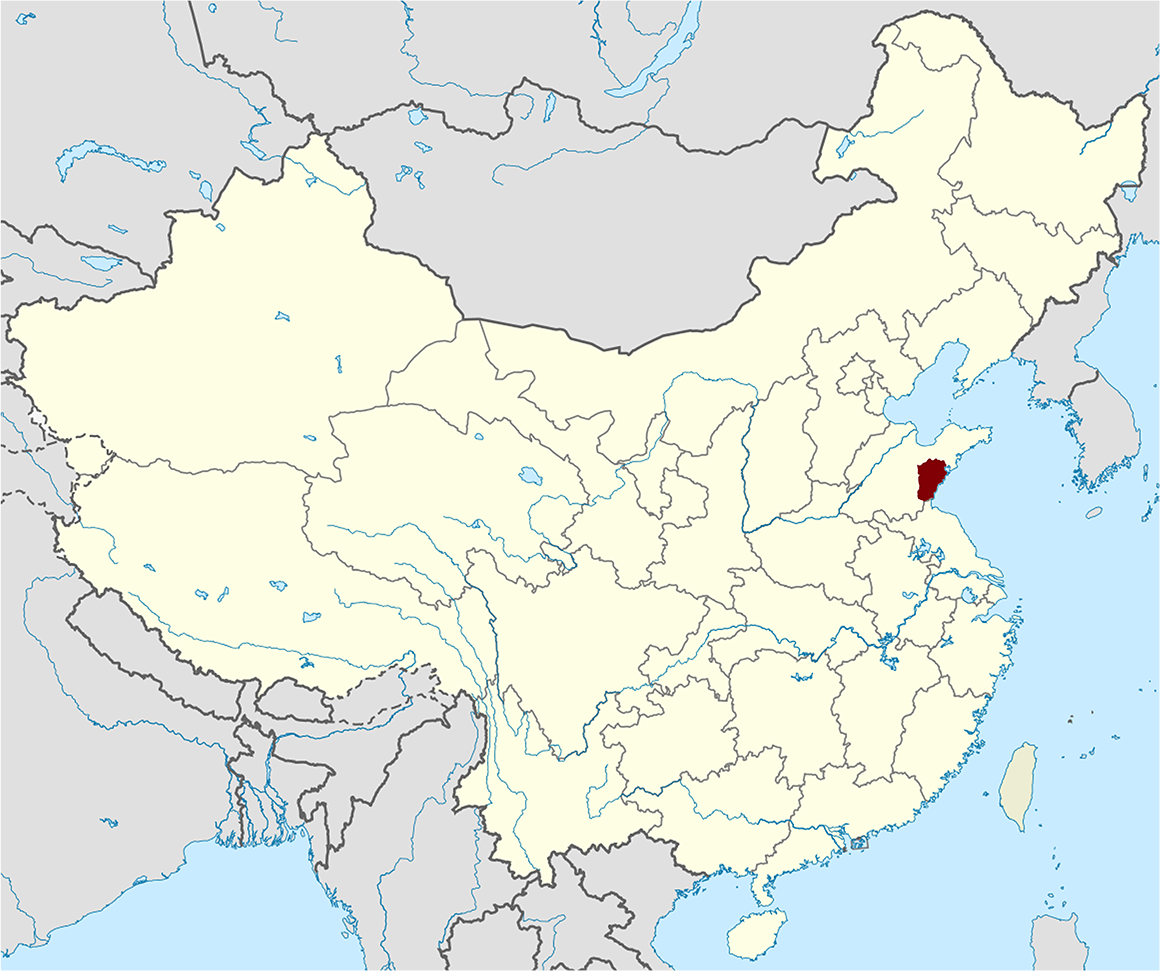
- Population
  - 740s or 750s: 146,524
  - 1100s: 327,340
- History
  - Preceded by: Gaomi Commandery
  - Created: 585 (Sui dynasty); 622 (Tang dynasty); 758 (Tang dynasty)
  - Abolished: 1368 (Ming dynasty)
- Contained within
  - Circuit: Henan Circuit; Jingdong Circuit (960–1072); Jingdong East Circuit (after 1072); Shandong East Circuit

Mizhou or Mi Prefecture was a zhou (prefecture) in imperial China in modern southeastern Shandong, China. It existed (intermittently) from 585 until 1368 upon the foundation of the Ming dynasty.

== Counties ==
Mi Prefecture administered the following counties (縣) through history:

#	Sui dynasty	Tang dynasty	Later Liang	Later Tang	Later Jin; Later Han; Later Zhou	Song dynasty; Jin dynasty; Yuan dynasty	Modern location
1	Zhucheng (諸城)						Zhucheng
2	Anqiu (安丘)	Futang (輔唐)	Anqiu	Futang	Jiaoxi (膠西)	Anqiu	Anqiu
3	Anqiu (安丘)	Futang (輔唐)	Anqiu	Futang	Jiaoxi (膠西)	Jiaoxi	Jiaozhou City
4	Gaomi (高密)						Gaomi
5	Ju (莒)						Ju County
