= Shandong East Circuit =

Province during the Jin dynasty

- Traditional Chinese: 山東東路
- Simplified Chinese: 山东东路
Transcriptions
Standard Mandarin
- Hanyu Pinyin: Shāndōng Dōng Lù

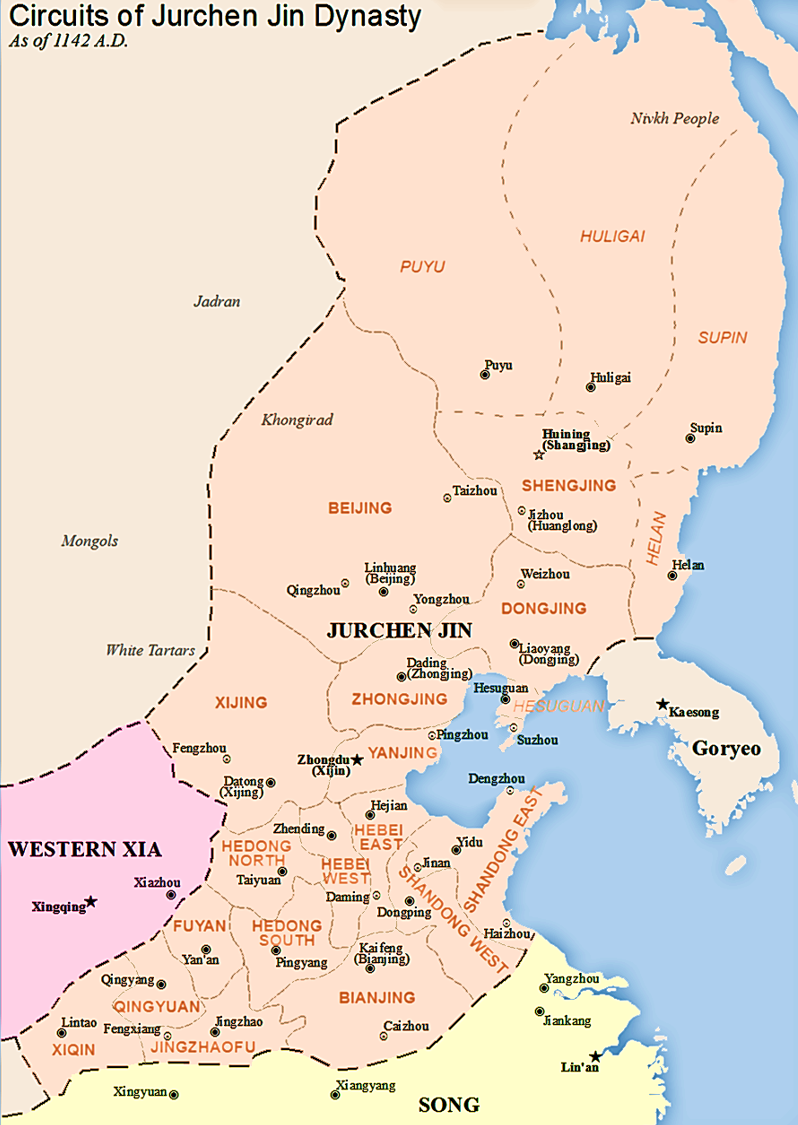
Shandong East Circuit can be seen with in Jin territory

Shandong East Circuit or Shandong East Province was one of the major circuits during the Jin dynasty. Before Jin invaded the area, it was administered as Jingdong East Circuit under the Song dynasty.
