= Pu Prefecture (Shandong) =

Historical administrative division in Shandong, China

- Chinese: 濮州
Transcriptions
Standard Mandarin
- Hanyu Pinyin: Pū Zhōu
- Wade–Giles: P'u^{1} Chou^{1}

Puzhou or Pu Prefecture was a zhou (prefecture) in Imperial China, centering on modern-day Juancheng County, Shandong. It existed intermittently from 596 until 1913.

== See also ==
- Puyang Commandery
