= Chengwu County =

Chengwu County 成武县
- County
- Location of the seat in Shandong
- Coordinates: 34°57′N 115°53′E
- Country: People's Republic of China
- Province: Shandong
- Prefecture-level city: Heze

Area
  - Total: 998 km^{2} (385 sq mi)
- Elevation: 46 m (151 ft)

Population (2019)
  - Total: 643,700
  - Density: 645/km^{2} (1,670/sq mi)
- Time zone: UTC+8 (China Standard)
- Postal Code: 274200

Chengwu County (simplified Chinese: 成武县; traditional Chinese: 成武縣; pinyin: Chéngwǔ Xiàn) is a county of southwestern Shandong province, People's Republic of China. It is under the administration of Heze city.

The population in 1999 was 622,871.

== Administrative divisions ==
As of 2012, this County is divided to 10 towns and 2 townships.

Towns

- Chengwu (成武镇)
- Datianji (大田集镇)
- Tiangongmiao (天宫庙镇)
- Wenshangji (汶上集镇)
- Nanluji (南鲁集镇)
- Boleji (伯乐集镇)
- Goucunji (苟村集镇)
- Baifutu (白浮图镇)
- Sunsi (孙寺镇)
- Jiunüji (九女集镇)

Townships

- Dangji Township (党集乡)
- Zhanglou Township (张楼乡)

== Climate ==
Climate data for Chengwu, elevation 45 m (148 ft), (1991–2020 normals, extremes 1981–2010)
Month	Jan	Feb	Mar	Apr	May	Jun	Jul	Aug	Sep	Oct	Nov	Dec	Year
Record high °C (°F)	16.8 (62.2)	25.3 (77.5)	28.2 (82.8)	32.7 (90.9)	38.5 (101.3)	40.0 (104.0)	41.5 (106.7)	38.8 (101.8)	36.6 (97.9)	32.7 (90.9)	27.6 (81.7)	20.3 (68.5)	41.5 (106.7)
Mean daily maximum °C (°F)	5.0 (41.0)	9.1 (48.4)	15.3 (59.5)	21.7 (71.1)	27.0 (80.6)	31.7 (89.1)	32.1 (89.8)	30.8 (87.4)	27.2 (81.0)	21.8 (71.2)	13.9 (57.0)	7.0 (44.6)	20.2 (68.4)
Daily mean °C (°F)	0.3 (32.5)	3.8 (38.8)	9.5 (49.1)	15.7 (60.3)	21.2 (70.2)	25.9 (78.6)	27.4 (81.3)	26.2 (79.2)	21.9 (71.4)	15.9 (60.6)	8.4 (47.1)	2.1 (35.8)	14.9 (58.7)
Mean daily minimum °C (°F)	−3.2 (26.2)	−0.1 (31.8)	4.9 (40.8)	10.4 (50.7)	16.0 (60.8)	20.8 (69.4)	23.6 (74.5)	22.7 (72.9)	17.8 (64.0)	11.5 (52.7)	4.4 (39.9)	−1.4 (29.5)	10.6 (51.1)
Record low °C (°F)	−16.0 (3.2)	−14.0 (6.8)	−8.9 (16.0)	−2.7 (27.1)	3.9 (39.0)	11.4 (52.5)	17.0 (62.6)	12.3 (54.1)	6.0 (42.8)	−2.0 (28.4)	−12.6 (9.3)	−16.7 (1.9)	−16.7 (1.9)
Average precipitation mm (inches)	12.0 (0.47)	16.2 (0.64)	17.3 (0.68)	34.0 (1.34)	52.1 (2.05)	73.9 (2.91)	180.0 (7.09)	156.9 (6.18)	75.6 (2.98)	31.4 (1.24)	29.5 (1.16)	11.5 (0.45)	690.4 (27.19)
Average precipitation days (≥ 0.1 mm)	3.6	4.4	3.9	5.1	6.3	7.1	11.8	10.2	8.2	5.2	5.3	3.6	74.7
Average snowy days	3.3	2.7	0.6	0.1	0	0	0	0	0	0	0.9	1.6	9.2
Average relative humidity (%)	65	61	58	62	65	64	78	82	76	69	68	66	68
Mean monthly sunshine hours	125.6	129.0	177.0	204.0	210.6	187.7	168.5	158.2	151.3	146.9	136.1	128.5	1,923.4
Percentage possible sunshine	40	41	47	52	48	43	38	38	41	42	44	42	43
Source: China Meteorological Administration
