= Yanzhou, Jining =

Yanzhou 兖州区
- District
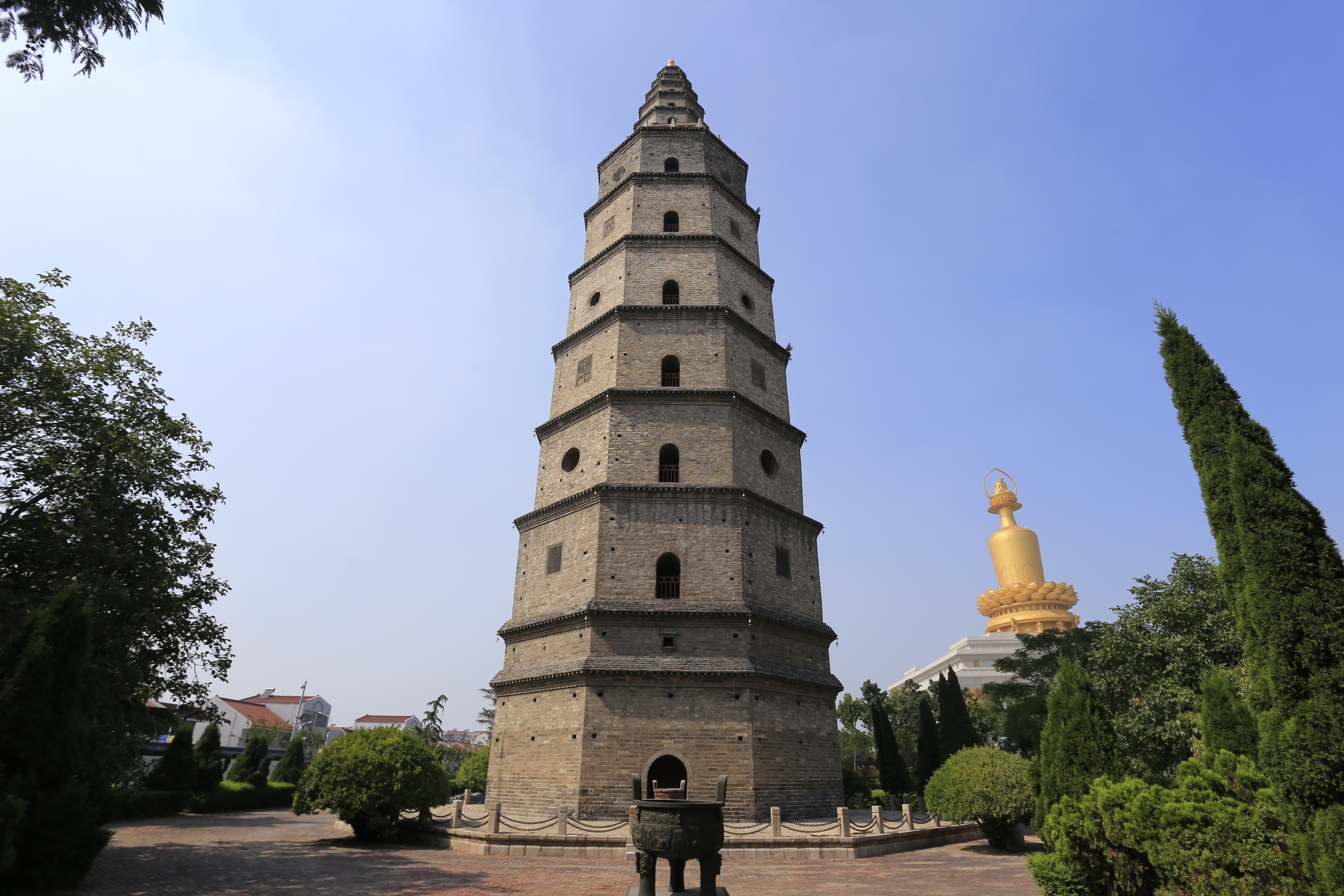
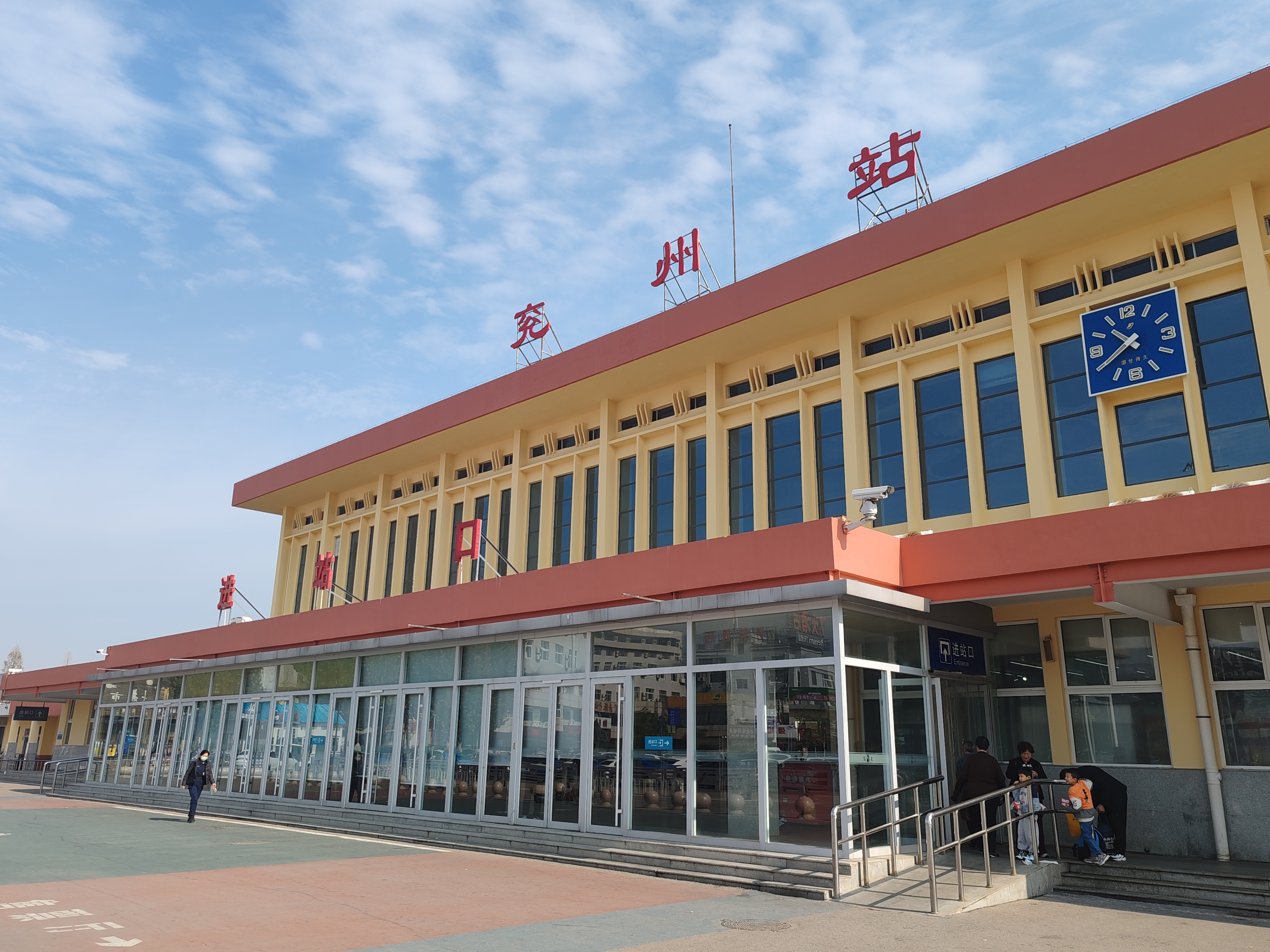
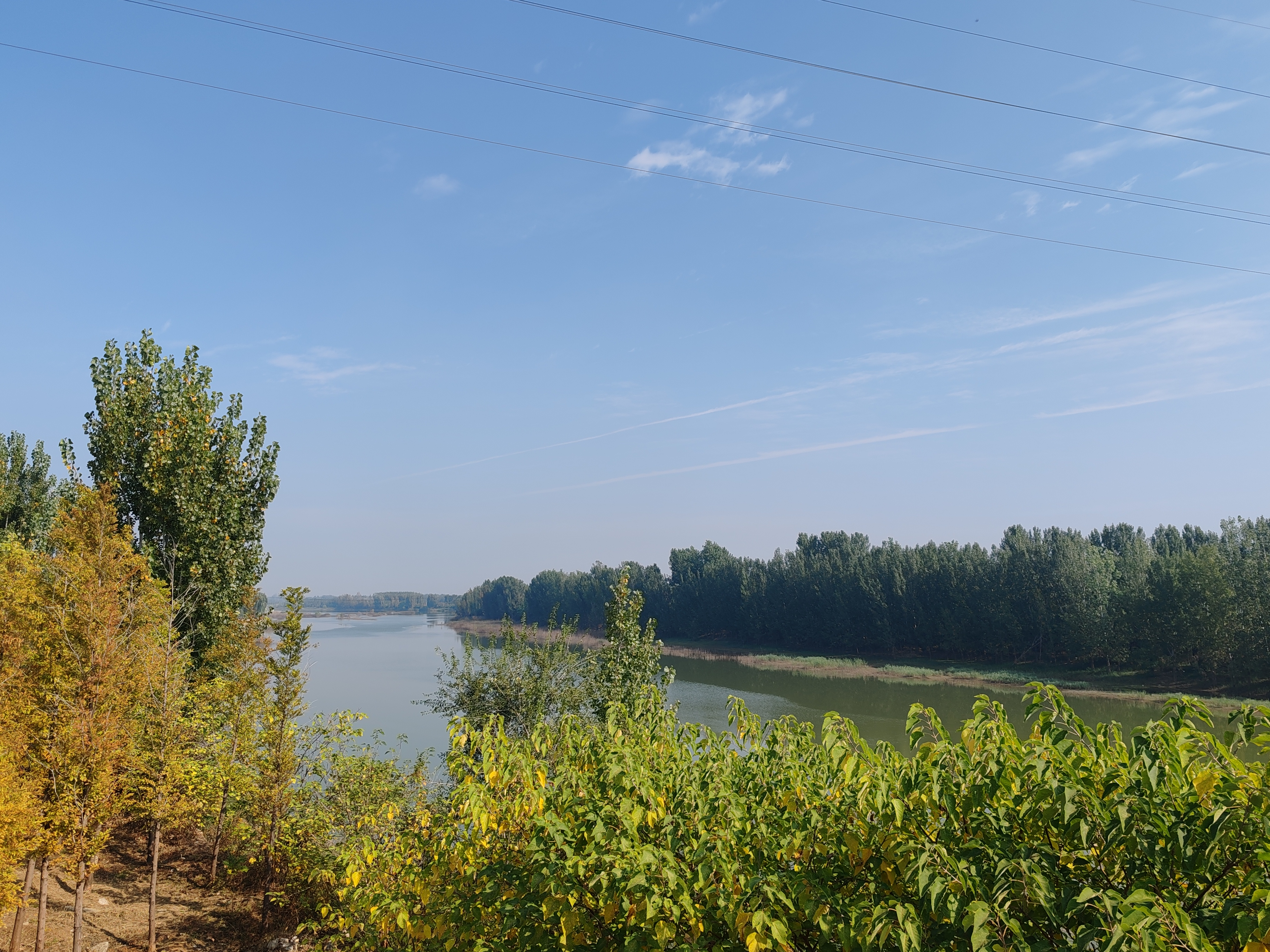
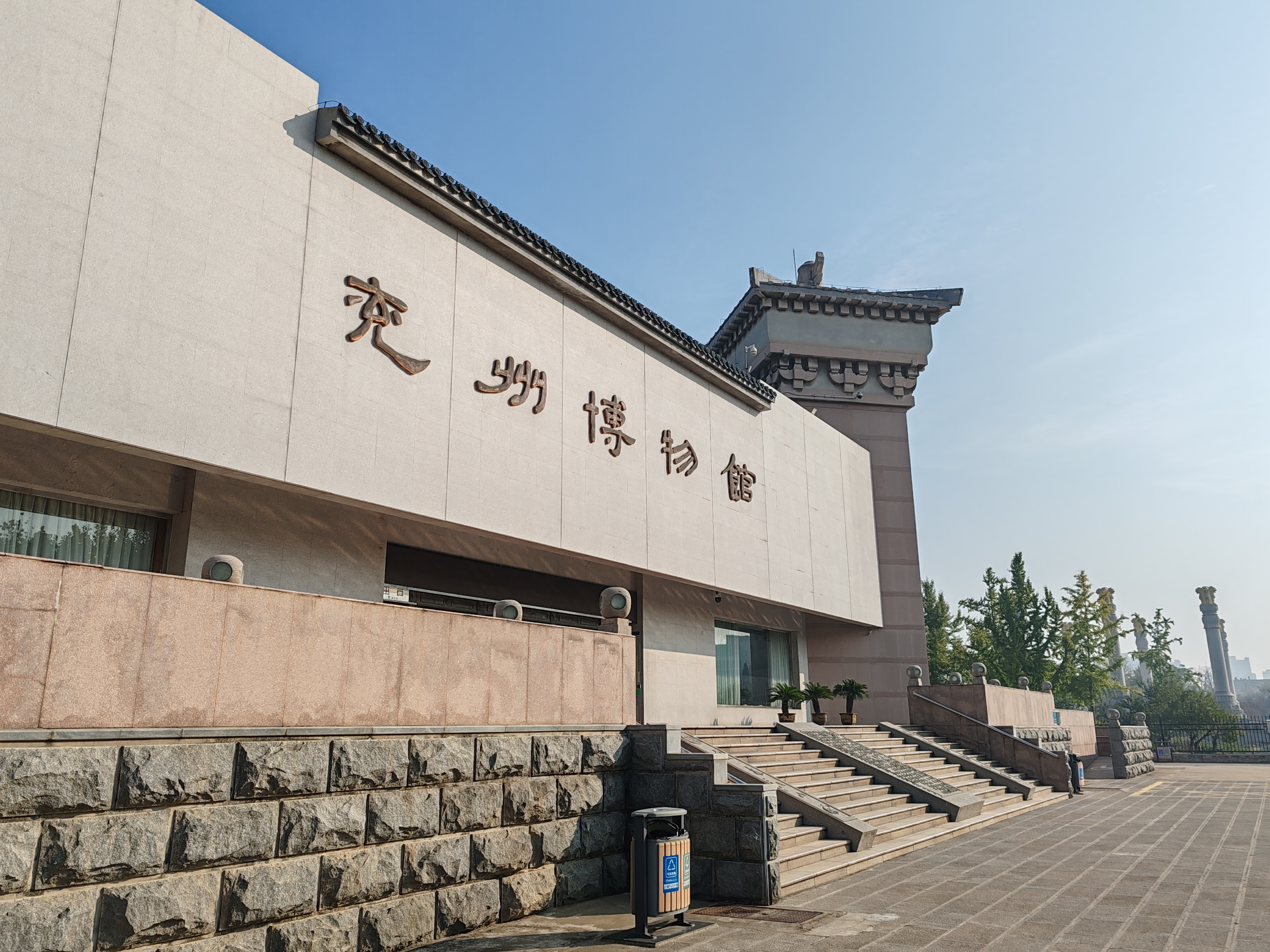
- Xinglong Pagoda Railway station of Yanzhou Si River Yanzhou Museum

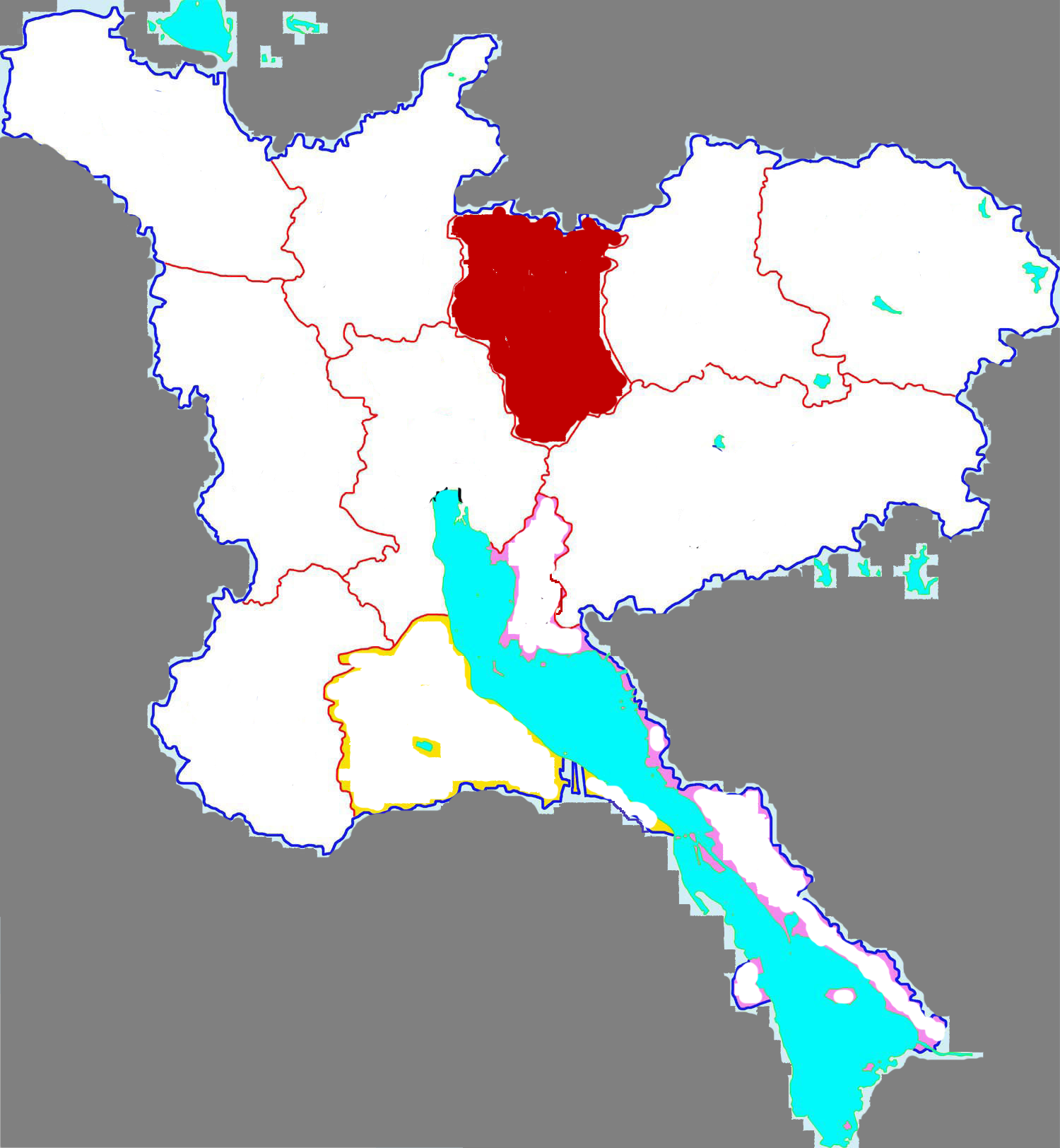
- Location in Jining

- Location in Shandong
- Coordinates: 35°33′N 116°47′E
- Country: People's Republic of China
- Province: Shandong
- Prefecture-level city: Jining
- Township-level divisions: 5 subdistricts 7 towns
- Municipal seat: Longqiao Subdistrict (龙桥街道)

Government
  - District party secretary: Wang Hongwei (王宏伟)
  - District Chief: Wang Xiaohong (王骁)

Area
  - District: 651 km^{2} (251 sq mi)
- Elevation: 45 m (148 ft)

Population (2017)
  - District: 553,200
  - Density: 850/km^{2} (2,200/sq mi)
  - Urban: 375,500
- Time zone: UTC+8 (China Standard)
- Postal code: 272100
- Area code: 0537
- Licence plate prefixes: 鲁H
- Major nationalities: Han-99.55%
- GDP: 2017
- Total: ¥72 billion 312 million
- Per capita: ¥113,217
- Website: www.yanzhou.gov.cn
- Surface area, population, economic data reference Yanzhou District National Economic and Social Development in 2017

Yanzhou (postal: Yenchow; simplified Chinese: 兖州; traditional Chinese: 兗州; pinyin: Yǎnzhōu) is a district in the prefecture-level city of Jining, in the southwest of Shandong province, People's Republic of China. It was also the name of one of the Nine Provinces in ancient China, where Yu combated floods by water control.

== Administration ==
Yanzhou District administers six subdistricts and six towns:

=== Subdistricts (街道) ===
- Longqiao Subdistrict (龙桥街道)—the district seat
- Gulou Subdistrict (鼓楼街道)
- Jiuxianqiao Subdistrict (酒仙桥街道)
- Wangyin Subdistrict (王因街道)
- Huangtun Subdistrict (黄屯街道)
- Xinglongzhuang Subdistrict (兴隆庄街道)

=== Towns (镇) ===
- Da'an (大安镇)
- Xinyi (新驿镇)
- Yandian (颜店镇)
- Xinyan (新兖镇)
- Caohe (漕河镇)
- Xiaomeng (小孟镇)

== History ==
Yanzhou was the first place to install the "school-fields" xuetian in 1022, during the Song dynasty.

In early European sources, based on accounts by French missionaries, the name of Yanzhou (Fu) is transcribed in the contemporary French manner, as Yen-tcheou-fou; however, when reading 18th- and 19th-century books in French or English, care should be taken not to confuse Yanzhou in Shandong with the identically transcribed Yanzhou in Zhejiang.

== Geology ==
The land structure of the Yinzhou area belongs to the Luxi fault block uplift (level III) and the Zhangzhou fault (Grade IV) unit. The eastern part of the boundary is the Yishan fault, the west is the Sunshidian fault, and the north is the Wensi fault. It is the Fushan fault. Yanzhou is part of it. The basement is the metamorphic rock series of the Mount Tai Group. The Paleozoic, Mesozoic and Cenozoic strata are developed above the basement. Among them, rich industrial coal seams are formed in the Late Paleozoic strata, which is an important base for Yanzhou becoming national coal resources. The tectonic movement in the territory has shaped various structural topography, which are roughly two types of fault structure and fold structure. The strata of all walks of life are developed from the old to the new for the Early Paleozoic strata, the Paleozoic strata, the Mesozoic strata, and the Neogene stratigraphic strata. In the early Paleozoic, the horizon was in a state of slow decline, with large-scale transgression, and the deposition of thick shallow sand shale and carbonate rock formations. The Ordovician rocks in the Paleozoic are mainly light gray and gray thick layered limestone, crystalline limestone and leopard skin limestone; the Carboniferous rocks are mainly gray-white siltstone, clay rock, shale and thin layer limestone. Several layers of coal; the two rocks are mainly grayish white, dark gray sandstone and variegated mudstone and brown shale, rich in plant fossils. The Mesozoic Jurassic rocks are mainly brown sandstone, conglomerate, variegated mudstone and glutenite. The Cenozoic is made up of Tertiary and Quaternary strata. The Tertiary is sandstone, sticky sandstone, and mudstone; the Quaternary strata are loose rock formations composed of Wenyu alluvial deposits. The west is the Wenhe alluvial fan, the east is the Weihe alluvial fan, and the two overlapping alluvial fans are located in the area of Qianqian-Da'an-Tianqi Temple.

Yanzhou District is located in the sloping plain of the southwestern part of the Mount Tai in the Luzhong Mountains. The west is flooded by the flood waters, and the flood alluvial landforms are obvious; the eastern waters are discharged to the southwest, and the terrain is inclined from the northeast to the southwest; the central Guangfu River and the Yangjiahe River are parallel and the terrain is low. The ground elevation is 60~38 meters, the height difference is 22 meters and the average elevation is 49 meters, and the average slope is 1/1500. The northeast is affected by the structure and is a shallow buried area of the Tertiary, with a large slope on the ground. The plain area is 64,670 hectares, accounting for 99.7% of the total area; it is divided into three types: micro-sloping ground, depression and slow-moving. The area is 45,601 hectares, accounting for 70.35% of the total area; the area is 12276.9 hectares, accounting for 18.94% of the total area; the area is 6792.2 hectares, accounting for 10.48% of the total area.

The hills in the territory belong to the bedrock of the Mount Tai hidden under the Quaternary cover. There is a hill 15 kilometers west of the city, named Ziyang Mountain. It is the only hill in Yanzhou. It is a bare hill of the Ordovician limestone. It is a low hill type. It is divided into two peaks, east peak is 75 meters above sea level, and west peak is 72.5 meters above sea level. The mountain is spread from east to west, 1.5 kilometers long and one kilometer wide, covering an area of 1.5 square kilometers. The rock is limestone, and the Qing Dynasty has been sporadic mining, although it is forbidden. In the later period of the "Cultural Revolution", the trees on the mountain were cut down, and the mountain quarry was cut off. The East Peak had become a deep valley, and the west peak still existed.

== Climate ==
Yanzhou has a monsoon-influenced, four-season humid continental climate (Köppen Dwa). Winters are cold and dry while summers are hot and humid. Monthly daily average temperatures range from −1.0 °C (30.2 °F) in January to 26.8 °C (80.2 °F), while the annual mean temperature is 13.79 °C (56.8 °F). More than 70% of the annual precipitation occurs from June to September, with barely any occurring in the winter months. The city receives 2,461 hours of bright sunshine annually.

Climate data for Yanzhou District, elevation 52 m (171 ft), (1991–2020 normals, extremes 1991–present)
Month	Jan	Feb	Mar	Apr	May	Jun	Jul	Aug	Sep	Oct	Nov	Dec	Year
Record high °C (°F)	16.3 (61.3)	22.8 (73.0)	30.7 (87.3)	32.2 (90.0)	38.5 (101.3)	39.9 (103.8)	41.1 (106.0)	37.2 (99.0)	36.7 (98.1)	35.2 (95.4)	26.2 (79.2)	18.3 (64.9)	41.1 (106.0)
Mean daily maximum °C (°F)	5.1 (41.2)	8.9 (48.0)	14.9 (58.8)	21.3 (70.3)	26.8 (80.2)	31.5 (88.7)	31.9 (89.4)	30.8 (87.4)	27.3 (81.1)	21.6 (70.9)	13.5 (56.3)	6.8 (44.2)	20.0 (68.0)
Daily mean °C (°F)	−0.8 (30.6)	2.7 (36.9)	8.6 (47.5)	15.1 (59.2)	20.7 (69.3)	25.5 (77.9)	27.2 (81.0)	25.9 (78.6)	21.2 (70.2)	14.9 (58.8)	7.3 (45.1)	0.9 (33.6)	14.1 (57.4)
Mean daily minimum °C (°F)	−5.3 (22.5)	−2.4 (27.7)	2.8 (37.0)	8.8 (47.8)	14.3 (57.7)	19.6 (67.3)	23.1 (73.6)	21.9 (71.4)	16.3 (61.3)	9.5 (49.1)	2.4 (36.3)	−3.5 (25.7)	9.0 (48.1)
Record low °C (°F)	−16.1 (3.0)	−13.7 (7.3)	−7.9 (17.8)	−5.0 (23.0)	1.5 (34.7)	9.0 (48.2)	16.6 (61.9)	12.7 (54.9)	4.7 (40.5)	−1.9 (28.6)	−14.1 (6.6)	−13.7 (7.3)	−16.1 (3.0)
Average precipitation mm (inches)	7.5 (0.30)	12.1 (0.48)	16.3 (0.64)	36.4 (1.43)	54.8 (2.16)	84.7 (3.33)	181.6 (7.15)	164.8 (6.49)	64.7 (2.55)	30.7 (1.21)	28.7 (1.13)	9.7 (0.38)	692 (27.25)
Average precipitation days (≥ 0.1 mm)	2.8	4.0	3.7	5.2	6.2	7.9	11.1	10.8	7.0	5.3	5.0	3.3	72.3
Average snowy days	2.7	2.4	0.4	0.1	0	0	0	0	0	0	0.7	1.6	7.9
Average relative humidity (%)	66	62	58	63	66	65	80	83	78	74	74	70	70
Mean monthly sunshine hours	148.8	154.7	208.1	234.0	254.5	232.0	209.2	206.3	194.3	190.1	160.6	151.0	2,343.6
Percentage possible sunshine	48	50	56	59	58	53	48	50	53	55	53	50	53
Source: China Meteorological Administration

== Economy ==
In 2012, the city's GDP reached 50.62 billion yuan, up 13.1%; local fiscal revenue 3.008 billion yuan, an increase of 22.65%; major economic indicators higher than the provincial average, income growth higher than the GDP growth rate of urban and rural residents. First three quarters of 2012, the GDP of 41.35 billion yuan, an increase of 11.9%; 1–10 months, local fiscal revenue 3.13 billion yuan, up 14.4 percent; 17.94 billion yuan in fixed assets investment, an increase of 22.9%. Yanzhou Coal Mining Company is headquartered in Yanzhou.

The economic aggregate has reached a new level. According to preliminary calculations, in 2017, the region's Gross Regional Product (GDP) exceeded 70 billion yuan, reaching 72.312 billion yuan, a year-on-year increase of 6.7% at comparable prices. Among them, the added value of the primary industry was 4.659 billion yuan, up 2.8% year-on-year; the added value of the secondary industry was 39.699 billion yuan, up 6.1% year-on-year; the added value of the tertiary industry was 27.954 billion yuan, up 8.4% year-on-year. According to the industry, the added value of agriculture, forestry, animal husbandry and fishery was 4.794 billion yuan, up 3.2%; the industrial added value was 35.909 billion yuan, up 6.8%; the construction industry added value was 3.808 billion yuan, down 0.4%; the wholesale and retail industry added value was 7.805 billion yuan, an increase of 1.9%; transportation, warehousing and postal industry added value of 2.267 billion yuan, an increase of 8.6%; accommodation and catering industry added value of 891 million yuan, an increase of 2.6%; financial industry added value of 2.094 billion yuan, an increase of 12%; real estate industry The added value was 1.197 billion yuan, an increase of 4.9%; the added value of other service industries was 13.547 billion yuan, an increase of 12.6%. The three industrial structure ratios were adjusted from 7.3:54.5:38.2 in 2016 to 6.4:54.9:38.7 in 2017. The value added of the service industry accounted for 38.7%, an increase of 0.5 percentage points over the same period of the previous year. The per capita GDP of the region reached 113,217 yuan (converted to an annual average exchange rate of 16,769 US dollars), which was 6.2% higher at comparable prices.

== Transportation ==
- Beijing–Shanghai Railway
- Yanzhou–Shijiusuo Railway
- Xinxiang–Yanzhou Railway
- Rizhao–Lankao high-speed railway: Jining East railway station (济宁东站)

== Historic Sites ==
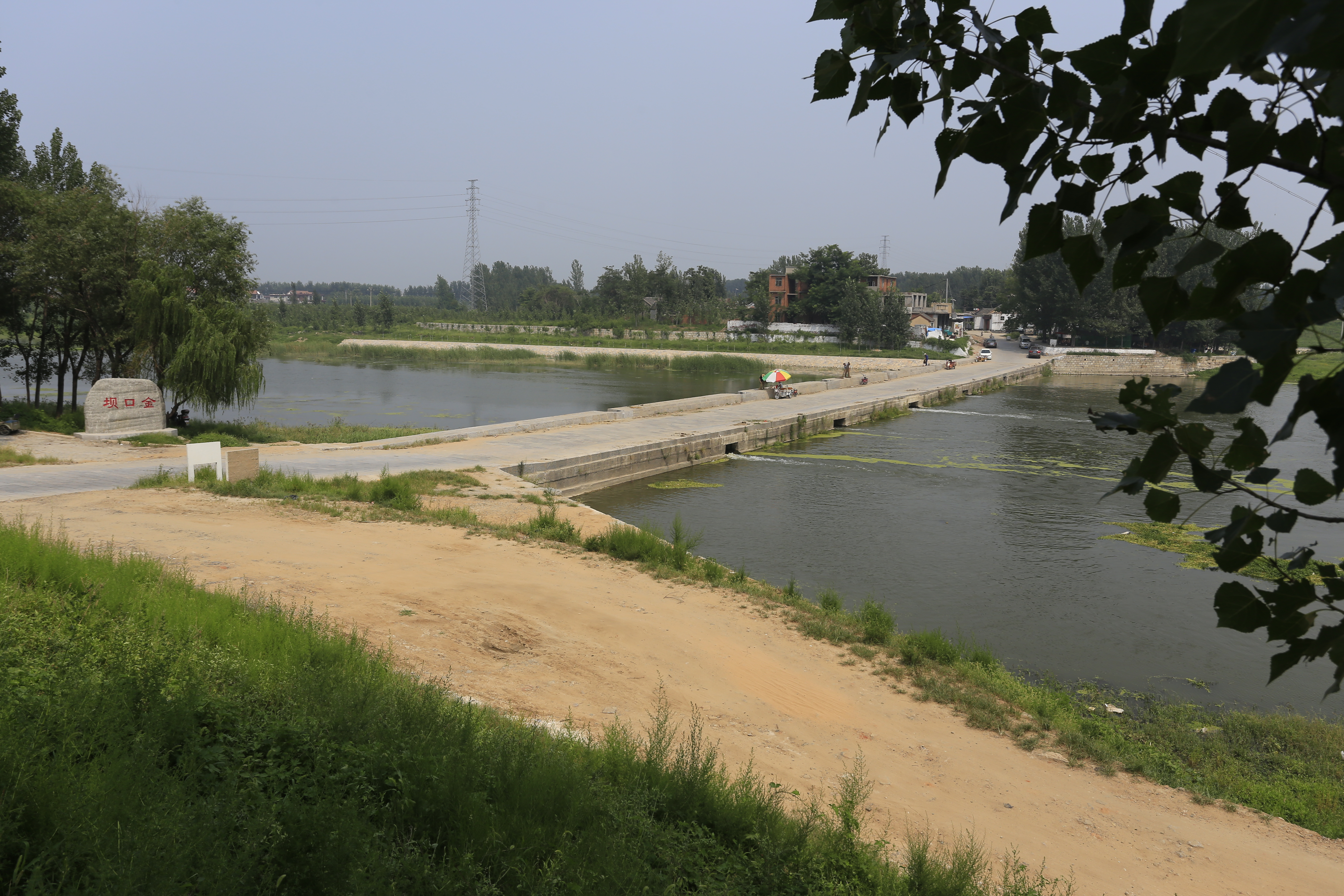
Jinkou Dam

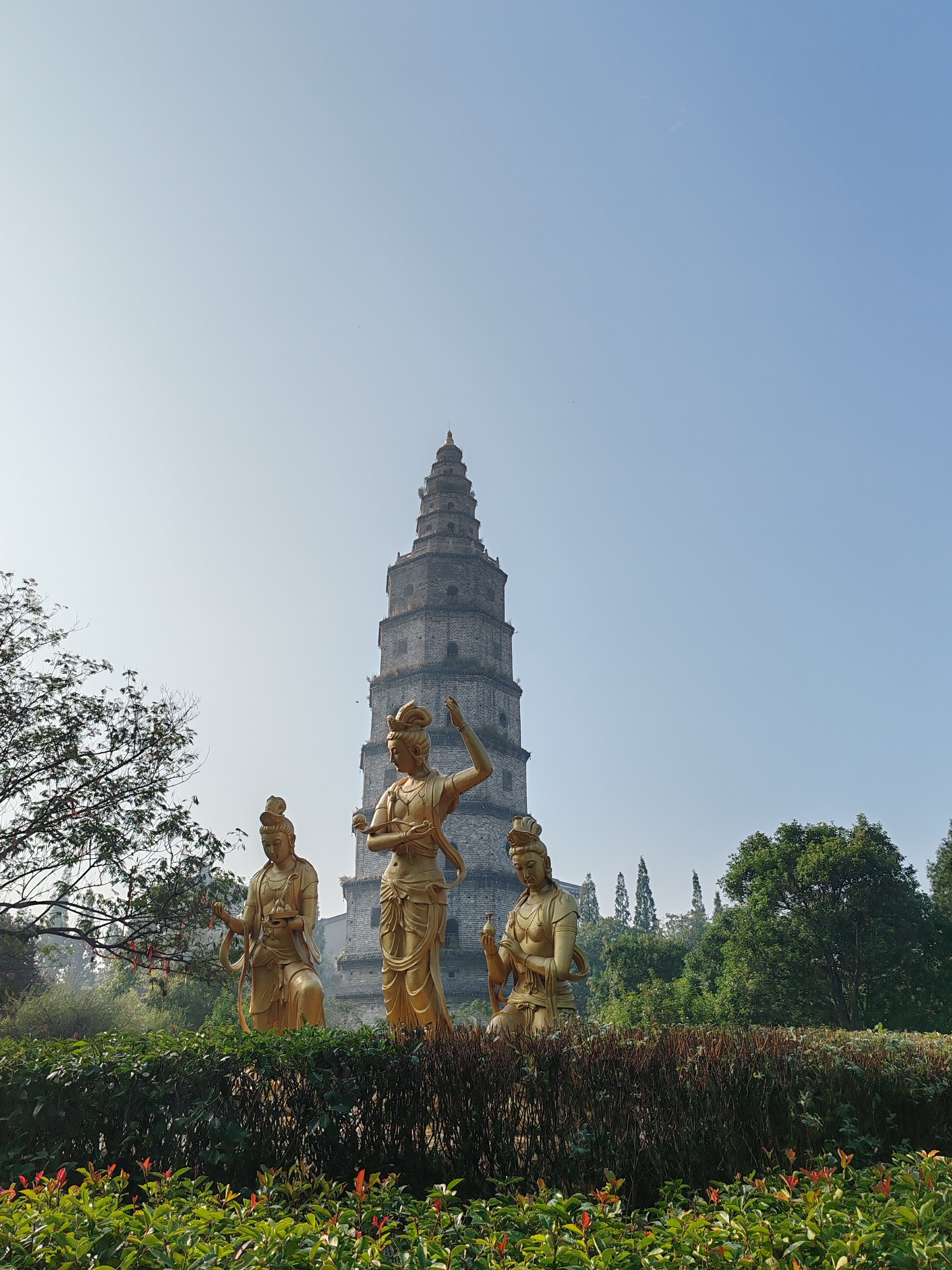
Xinglong Pagoda

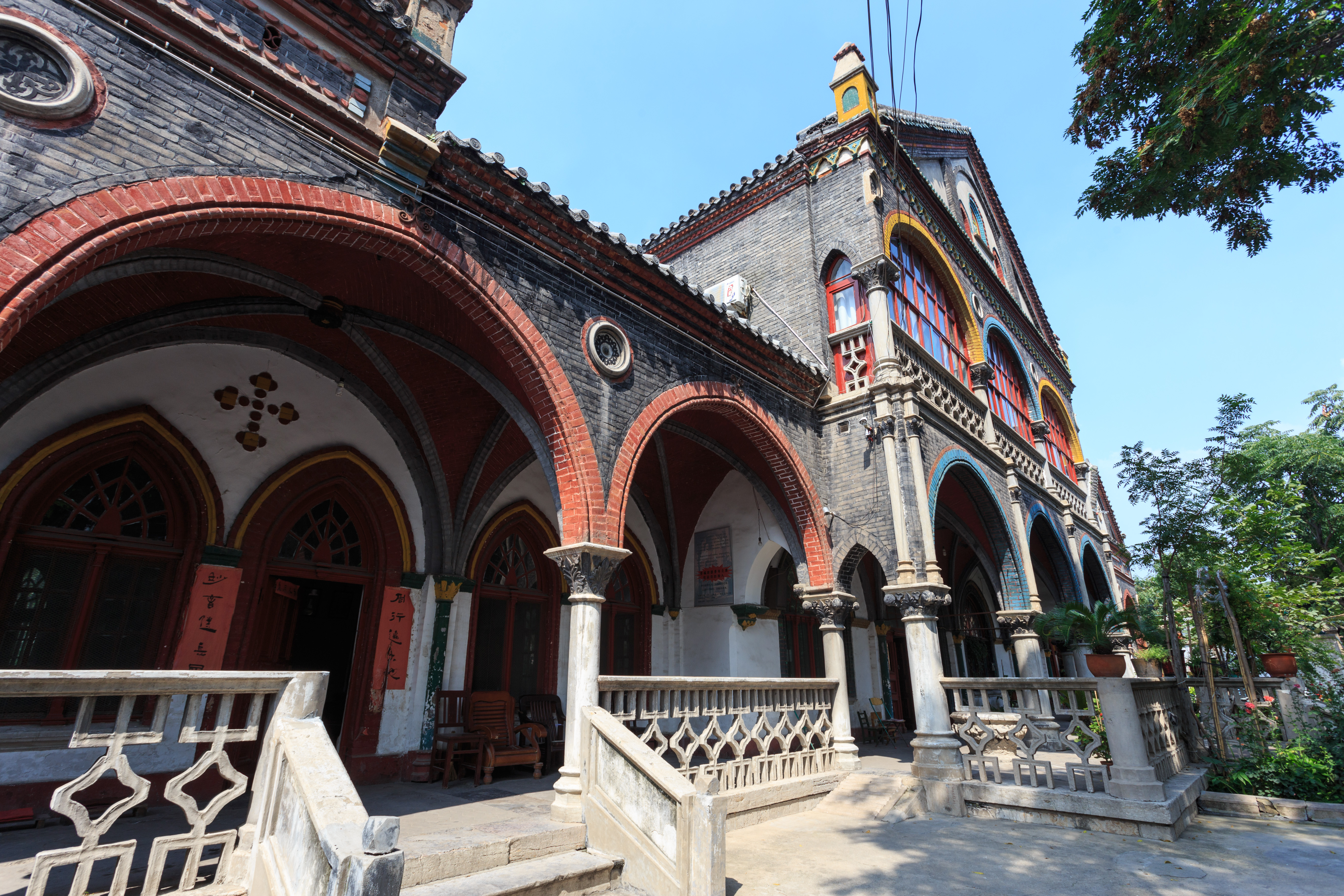
Cathedral of the Holy Spirit

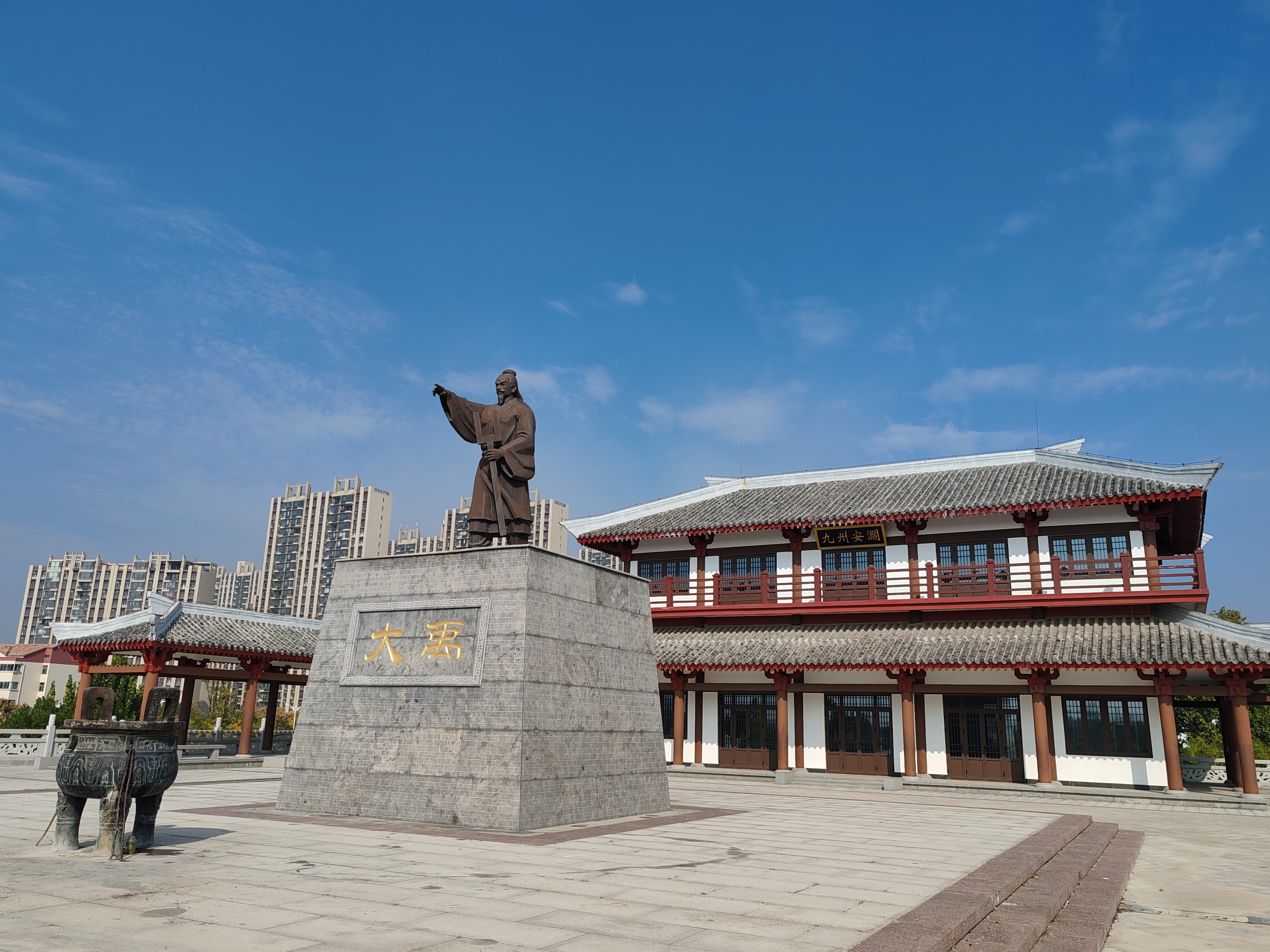
Statue of Yu the Great
