= Zhucheng =

Zhucheng 诸城市 Chucheng
- County-level city
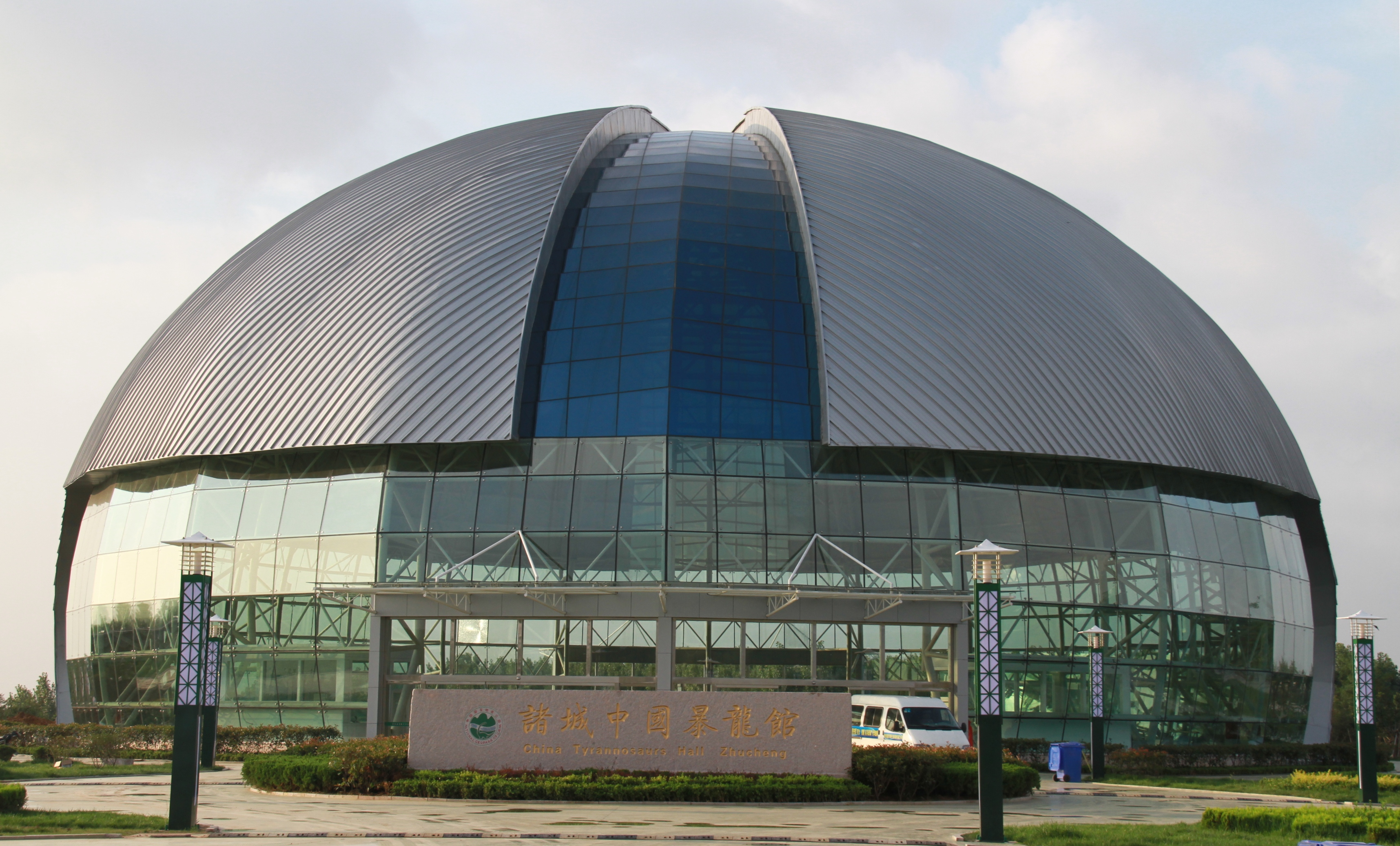
- The Sinotyrannus Hall in Zhucheng

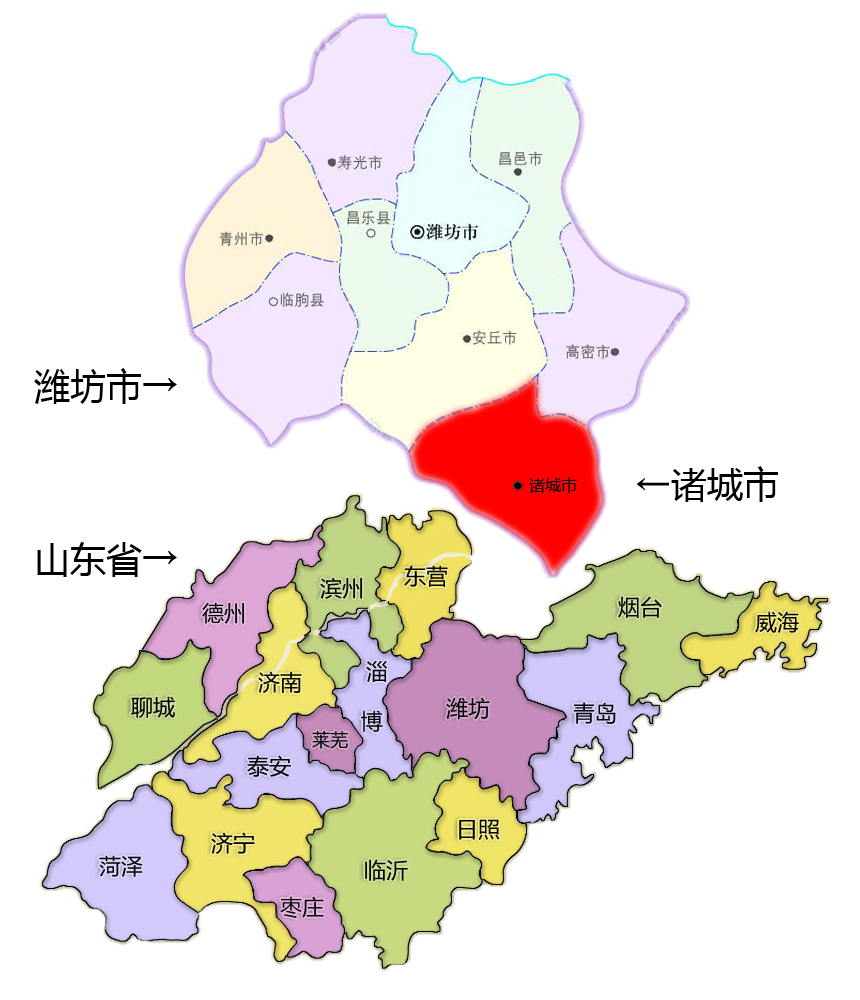
- Location of Zhucheng (red) within Weifang City, and location of Weifang City within Shandong province

- Location in Shandong
- Coordinates: 36°00′N 119°25′E
- Country: People's Republic of China
- Province: Shandong
- Prefecture-level city: Weifang

Area
  - Total: 2,183 km^{2} (843 sq mi)
- Elevation: 66 m (217 ft)

Population (2018)
  - Total: 1,109,000
  - Density: 508.0/km^{2} (1,316/sq mi)
- Time zone: UTC+8 (China Standard Time)
- Postal code: 262200
- Area code: 0536
- Website: www.zhucheng.gov.cn

Zhucheng (simplified Chinese: 诸城; traditional Chinese: 諸城; pinyin: Zhūchéng) is a county-level city in the southeast of Shandong province, People's Republic of China. It is under the administration of Weifang city and had at the 2010 census a population of 1,086,222.

== History ==
Zhucheng was originally known as Langya (琅琊). It was from here that Emperor Qin Shi Huang sent Xu Fu to sail towards Japan in 210 BC, in pursuit of the elixir of youth.

=== Song dynasty ===
In 585, Zhucheng was designated as the capital of Mi Prefecture, this setting last until the end of Jin dynasty. During the Song Dynasty, Zhucheng was known as Dongwu. Major figures who hailed from the area during the Song Dynasty include painter Zhang Zeduan, Zhao Tingzhi, and Zhao Mingcheng.

=== Ming dynasty ===
Wan Zhen'er, a famous concubine to Hongzhi Emperor, was born in Zhucheng.

=== Qing dynasty ===
Major Qing dynasty figures from Zhucheng include Liu Tongxun, Liu Yong, and Dou Guangnai.

=== People's Republic of China ===
Several important figures of the Chinese Communist Party were from Zhucheng, including Wang Jinmei, who participated in the founding of CCP, Jiang Qing, Mao Zedong's last wife and leader of the Gang of Four, Kang Sheng, one of the most prominent figure during Cultural Revolution, and Zhao Shucong, former vice-governor of Anhui province.

On 31 January 2021, the Zhucheng city government reported that a number of residents in Shunwang Subdistrict experienced symptoms of gas poisoning due to illegal discharge of chemical waste in the city. On 2 February, city authorities detained 16 suspects, and stated that the discharge had killed 4 people, and poisoned at least 37.

== Administration ==
Zhucheng was upgraded to a county-level city in 1987 and is administered as a provincial-level economic development district, and had jurisdiction over 3 subdistricts and 10 towns.

=== Subdistricts ===
The city's 3 subdistricts are Mizhou Subdistrict, Longdu Subdistrict, and Shunwang Subdistrict.

=== Towns ===
The city's 10 towns are Zhigou, Jiayue, Shiqiaozi, Xiangzhou, Changcheng, Baichihe, Xinxing, Linjiacun, Huanghua, and Taolin.

=== Former divisions ===
Former Towns merged to others include Lübiao (吕标镇), Wanjiazhuang (万家庄镇), Qiankou (箭口镇), Mengtuan (孟疃镇), Mazhuang (马庄镇), Chenggezhuang (程戈庄镇), Jiutai (九台镇), Guojiatun (郭家屯镇), Zhujie (朱解镇), Haogezhuang (郝戈庄镇) and Wadian (瓦店镇). Wadian has been merged into Linjia Village and is now Wadian community.

Former Townships merged to others include Taolin (桃林乡), Wujialou (吴家楼乡), Taoyuan (桃园乡), Shihetou (石河头乡), Shimen (石门乡), and Shandongtou (山东头乡).

== Climate ==
Climate data for Zhucheng, elevation 109 m (358 ft), (1991–2020 normals, extremes 1981–present)
Month	Jan	Feb	Mar	Apr	May	Jun	Jul	Aug	Sep	Oct	Nov	Dec	Year
Record high °C (°F)	16.9 (62.4)	22.9 (73.2)	29.5 (85.1)	34.6 (94.3)	36.1 (97.0)	39.6 (103.3)	40.9 (105.6)	37.9 (100.2)	37.7 (99.9)	34.1 (93.4)	26.9 (80.4)	19.7 (67.5)	40.9 (105.6)
Mean daily maximum °C (°F)	3.7 (38.7)	7.0 (44.6)	13.1 (55.6)	19.8 (67.6)	25.4 (77.7)	28.8 (83.8)	30.6 (87.1)	29.8 (85.6)	26.6 (79.9)	20.8 (69.4)	13.0 (55.4)	5.8 (42.4)	18.7 (65.6)
Daily mean °C (°F)	−1.3 (29.7)	1.5 (34.7)	6.9 (44.4)	13.6 (56.5)	19.3 (66.7)	23.1 (73.6)	26.0 (78.8)	25.3 (77.5)	21.2 (70.2)	15.1 (59.2)	7.8 (46.0)	1.0 (33.8)	13.3 (55.9)
Mean daily minimum °C (°F)	−5.0 (23.0)	−2.5 (27.5)	2.3 (36.1)	8.6 (47.5)	14.3 (57.7)	18.7 (65.7)	22.6 (72.7)	22.0 (71.6)	17.1 (62.8)	10.7 (51.3)	3.7 (38.7)	−2.7 (27.1)	9.2 (48.5)
Record low °C (°F)	−18.7 (−1.7)	−12.5 (9.5)	−8.4 (16.9)	−2.7 (27.1)	−0.6 (30.9)	8.9 (48.0)	15.4 (59.7)	13.8 (56.8)	7.2 (45.0)	−1.5 (29.3)	−12.0 (10.4)	−13.1 (8.4)	−18.7 (−1.7)
Average precipitation mm (inches)	10.9 (0.43)	16.6 (0.65)	17.8 (0.70)	33.4 (1.31)	60.9 (2.40)	73.3 (2.89)	149.6 (5.89)	219.5 (8.64)	69.8 (2.75)	33.1 (1.30)	30.0 (1.18)	13.2 (0.52)	728.1 (28.66)
Average precipitation days (≥ 0.1 mm)	3.2	4.0	4.4	6.3	7.3	8.3	11.8	12.8	7.5	5.5	5.6	4.0	80.7
Average snowy days	4.3	3.4	1.6	0.1	0	0	0	0	0	0	0.8	2.5	12.7
Average relative humidity (%)	62	61	58	59	64	71	81	82	75	69	66	63	68
Mean monthly sunshine hours	167.3	170.3	220.8	237.5	257.2	222.1	193.9	196.2	201.8	199.5	168.5	166.4	2,401.5
Percentage possible sunshine	54	55	59	60	59	51	44	47	55	58	55	55	54
Source: China Meteorological Administration all-time extreme temperature all-time August record high

== Economy ==
In 2005, Zhucheng had a total output value of RMB 20.8 billion and an average annual growth rate of 16%. Zhucheng is projected to continue its 16% annual growth rate and attain a total output value of RMB 43.6 billion by 2010.

=== Economic Development Zone ===
The Zhucheng Industrial Park was approved by the Shandong Provincial Government in 1992. Its total area spans 25 square kilometres (9.7 sq mi). The National Highway 206 which runs through it from south to north, and the city is linked by the Jiaoxin Railway Station, which connects it to Qingdao, 60 kilometres (37 mi) east, Rizhao, 60 kilometres (37 mi) south, and Weifang city, 80 kilometres (50 mi) north. As of 2001, industries based at the zone included food processing, chemicals, building materials, textiles and electromechanical products, and 2001 annual total industrial output was 2 billion yuan, with the added industrial value of 350 million yuan. For 2001, exports were US$68.92 million, and revenue was 83.17 million yuan.

=== Transportation ===
Zhucheng is about an hour's drive from Qingdao city.

== Dinosaur city ==
Zhucheng has been an important site for dinosaur excavation since 1960. The local community is known to use calcium rich fossils for traditional village remedies used to treat muscle cramps and other minor ailments. The world's largest hadrosaurid fossil was found in Zhucheng in the 1980s and is on display in the local museum. Scientists have collected more than 50 metric tons (55 short tons) of fossils since 1960. The city has also been a place for smuggling of dinosaur bones; in January 2008, Australia returned hundreds of kilograms of Chinese dinosaur fossils, including dinosaur fossil eggs. These fossils were recovered during a sting operation carried out on warehouses and cargo containers.

The ceratopsian Zhuchengceratops (2010), sauropod Zhuchengtitan (2017) and theropod Zhuchengtyrannus (2011) have been described from deposits near and named after Zhucheng.

=== 2008 discovery ===
On 31 December 2008, palaeontologists from the Institute of Vertebrate Paleontology and Paleoanthropology of Chinese Academy of Sciences announced they have unearthed 7,600 dinosaur fossils since March 2008 around Zhucheng. The latest sites to be discovered are near the towns of Longdu, Shunwang, Jiayue and Zhigou. The palaeontologists believe they have found one of the biggest sites of dinosaur remains from a massive excavation pit. The fossilized bones date to the late Late Cretaceous just prior to the Cretaceous–Paleogene extinction event. The findings also include the remains of a 20-metre (66 ft) hadrosaurid, a record size for the duck-billed dinosaur. A fossilized skull of a large ceratopsian was also found along with bones which belong to club-tailed ankylosaurs.

According to Professor Zhao Xijin, a palaeontologist in charge of the excavations from the Institute of Vertebrate Paleontology and Paleoanthropology, "This group of fossilised dinosaurs is currently the largest ever discovered in the world... in terms of area."

Such a high concentration of fossil bones in such a small area is significant for the theories of extinction of dinosaurs. A detailed scientific journal on the fossils is expected to be published later in 2009. Excavations are currently suspended for the winter but will resume when the weather gets warmer. Scientists believe a volcanic eruption may have killed the dinosaurs, and a subsequent flood carried the fossils to Zhucheng, which may have been a wetland covered in grass.

The local authorities in Shandong are making plans to set up a fossil park in the area.

== Demographics ==
=== Ethnicity ===
Population census
Year	Pop.	±%
1990	1,030,658	—
2000	1,057,313	+2.6%
2010 est.	1,194,800	+13.0%

Zhucheng is heavily industrialized and is one of the few dozen cities of China exceeding a million inhabitants. The major ethnic groups comprising the city include Han Chinese (99.7%), Manchu (0.1%), Korean (0.1%) and Hui (0.1%). The city has a Christian population of approximately of 19,000 (1.8%). Based on a census from the year 1990, the city had 523,425 males and 507,233 females with 260,678 households.

=== Notable people ===
There are several important historical and cultural figures from Zhucheng. Ancient tradition holds that Emperor Shun, one of the legendary sage-kings of China, was born in the region. During the Song dynasty, the renowned painter Zhang Zeduan, best remembered as the creator of Along the River During the Qingming Festival, is also believed to have originated from Zhucheng. In the Qing dynasty, the influential official Liu Tongxun and his son Liu Yong both came from Zhucheng. In modern times, Zhucheng became home to masters of the "Zhucheng School" of guqin music, such as Wang Xinyuan, who helped preserve and transmit this important cultural tradition. The city is also notable as the birthplace of Jiang Qing, the last wife of Mao Zedong and one of the most prominent political figures during the Cultural Revolution, as well as Kang Sheng, a senior Chinese Communist Party leader known for his role in intelligence and security affairs.

== Sister city ==
- Belleville, Ontario, Canada
- Sha, Fujian, China
