= Jinxiang County =

Jinxiang County 金乡县 Kinsiang
- County
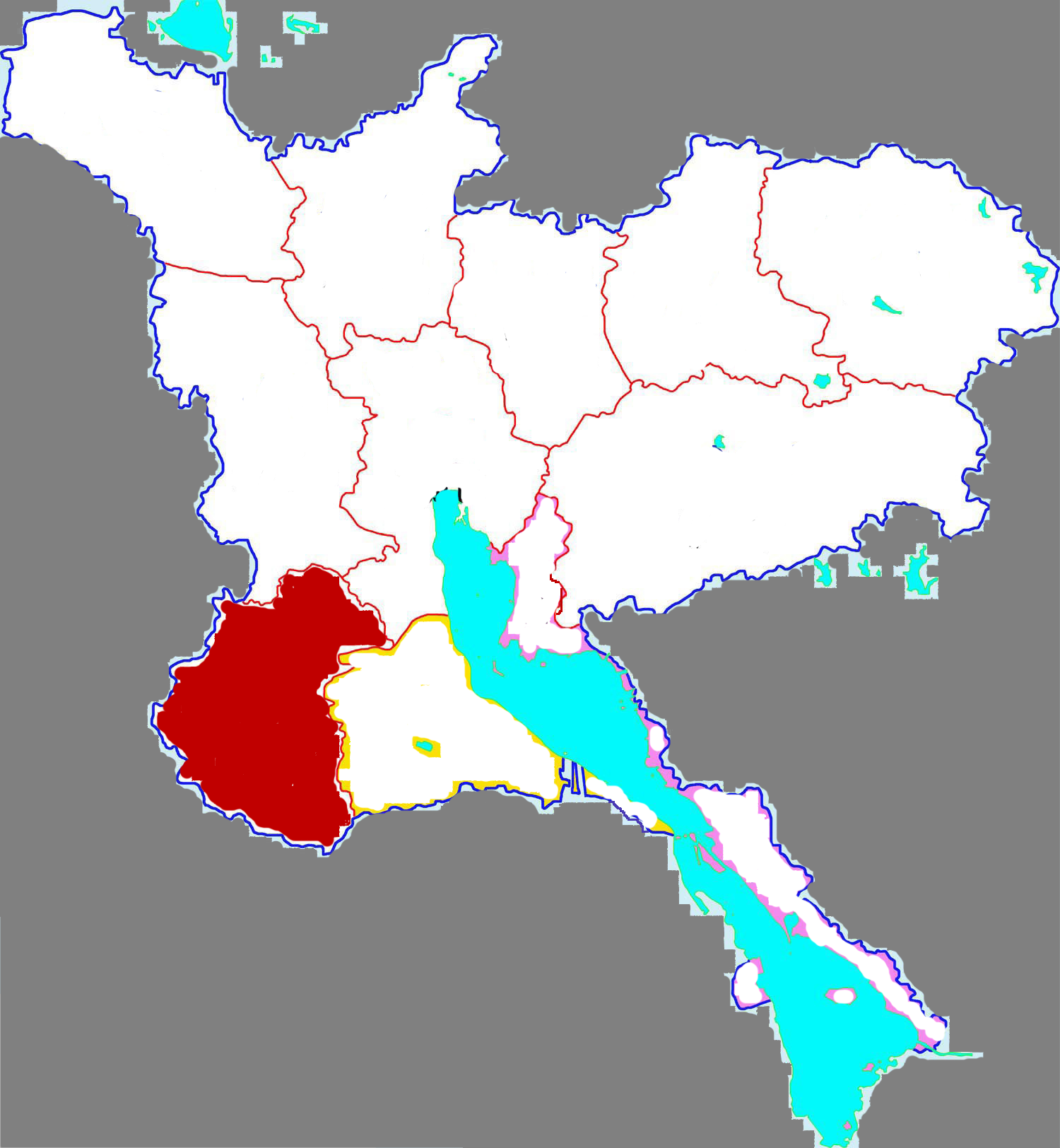
- Location in Jining

- Location in Shandong
- Coordinates: 35°04′N 116°19′E
- Country: People's Republic of China
- Province: Shandong
- Prefecture-level city: Jining

Area
  - Total: 886 km^{2} (342 sq mi)
- Elevation: 36 m (118 ft)

Population (2017)
  - Total: 673,000
  - Density: 760/km^{2} (1,970/sq mi)
- Time zone: UTC+8 (China Standard)
- Postal code: 272200
- Area code: (0)537
- License Plate Prefix: 鲁H
- Website: www.jinxiang.gov.cn

Jinxiang County (simplified Chinese: 金乡县; traditional Chinese: 金鄉縣; pinyin: Jīnxiāng Xiàn; lit. 'gold hometown') is a county of southwestern Shandong province, People's Republic of China, bordering Jiangsu province to the southeast. It is under the administration of Jining City.

The population was 601,369 in 1999.

The county town of Jinxiang is known as "the world's garlic capital", producing 80% of the world's garlic exports.

== Administrative divisions ==
As of 2012, this county is divided to 9 towns and 4 townships.

Towns

- Jinxiang (金乡镇)
- Yangshan (羊山镇)
- Huji (胡集镇)
- Xiaoyun (肖云镇)
- Jishu (鸡黍镇)
- Wangpi (王丕镇)
- Sima (司马镇)
- Yushan (鱼山镇)
- Mamiao (马庙镇)

Townships

- Huayu Township (化雨乡)
- Buji Township (卜集乡)
- Gaohe Township (高河乡)
- Xinglong Township (兴隆乡)

== Climate ==
Climate data for Jinxiang, elevation 36 m (118 ft), (1991–2020 normals, extremes 1981–2010)
Month	Jan	Feb	Mar	Apr	May	Jun	Jul	Aug	Sep	Oct	Nov	Dec	Year
Record high °C (°F)	16.7 (62.1)	25.3 (77.5)	28.9 (84.0)	34.0 (93.2)	37.0 (98.6)	39.3 (102.7)	39.6 (103.3)	37.5 (99.5)	36.1 (97.0)	35.5 (95.9)	26.9 (80.4)	20.3 (68.5)	39.6 (103.3)
Mean daily maximum °C (°F)	5.1 (41.2)	9.0 (48.2)	15.0 (59.0)	21.4 (70.5)	26.9 (80.4)	31.4 (88.5)	31.9 (89.4)	30.7 (87.3)	27.1 (80.8)	21.7 (71.1)	13.7 (56.7)	6.9 (44.4)	20.1 (68.1)
Daily mean °C (°F)	0.0 (32.0)	3.5 (38.3)	9.2 (48.6)	15.5 (59.9)	21.2 (70.2)	25.9 (78.6)	27.4 (81.3)	26.1 (79.0)	21.7 (71.1)	16.0 (60.8)	8.4 (47.1)	1.9 (35.4)	14.7 (58.5)
Mean daily minimum °C (°F)	−3.9 (25.0)	−1.0 (30.2)	4.1 (39.4)	10.1 (50.2)	15.8 (60.4)	20.8 (69.4)	23.6 (74.5)	22.5 (72.5)	17.3 (63.1)	11.4 (52.5)	4.1 (39.4)	−2.0 (28.4)	10.2 (50.4)
Record low °C (°F)	−15.2 (4.6)	−13.4 (7.9)	−9.7 (14.5)	−1.8 (28.8)	3.9 (39.0)	11.9 (53.4)	16.8 (62.2)	11.3 (52.3)	7.2 (45.0)	−0.3 (31.5)	−9.7 (14.5)	−13.0 (8.6)	−15.2 (4.6)
Average precipitation mm (inches)	9.4 (0.37)	15.0 (0.59)	20.8 (0.82)	37.4 (1.47)	52.4 (2.06)	67.8 (2.67)	182.4 (7.18)	169.6 (6.68)	69.4 (2.73)	30.0 (1.18)	28.0 (1.10)	11.6 (0.46)	693.8 (27.31)
Average precipitation days (≥ 0.1 mm)	3.3	3.9	4.4	5.7	6.7	7.4	11.3	10.5	7.4	5.2	5.1	3.5	74.4
Average snowy days	2.9	2.5	0.6	0.1	0	0	0	0	0	0	0.8	1.6	8.5
Average relative humidity (%)	65	61	58	63	64	65	80	83	77	68	69	67	68
Mean monthly sunshine hours	138.2	147.4	194.3	220.8	238.4	220.8	199.0	192.7	179.3	177.3	152.7	143.0	2,203.9
Percentage possible sunshine	44	47	52	56	55	51	45	47	49	51	50	47	50
Source: China Meteorological Administration
