= Tangyuan (disambiguation) =

Tangyuan (汤圆; 湯圓) is a Chinese food made from glutinous rice flour.

Tangyuan or Tang Yuan may also refer to:

- Tangyuan County (汤原县), of Jiamusi, Heilongjiang, China
- Tangyuan, Shandong (唐园镇), a town in Linqing, Shandong, China
- Tang Yuan (唐渊, born 1989), Chinese footballer

== See also ==
- Yuantang (language game)
- Tang (disambiguation)
- Yuan (disambiguation)
