= Won (Korean surname) =

- Hangul: 원
- Hanja: 元; 袁; 原; 阮; 苑; 院; 圓
- RR: Won
- MR: Wŏn

Won is an uncommon Korean surname.

== People with the name ==
- Won Bin (born 1977), South Korean actor
- Won Chang-yong (born 1973), South Korean former cyclist
- Won Du-jae (born 1997), South Korean football player
- Won Gyeong-suk (born 1976), South Korean sports shooter
- Won Hee-ryong (born 1964), South Korean politician
- Won Hong-gu (1888–1970), North Korean ornithologist and professor
- Won Hye-kyung (born 1979), South Korean short track speed skater
- Won Il (born 1967), South Korean musician
- Won In-choul (born 1961), former chairman of the Joint Chiefs of Staff of the Republic of Korea Armed Forces
- Won Jeong-sik (born 1990), South Korean weightlifter
- Won Jin-ah (born 1991), South Korean actress
- Won Jong-hyun (born 1987), South Korean professional baseball player
- Weon Jong-teok (born 1977), South Korean football player
- Won Ki-joon (born 1974), South Korean actor
- Wŏn Kyun (1540–1597), Joseon Dynasty naval commander
- Won Lee-sak (born 1994), better known by his in-game name PartinG, South Korean StarCraft II player
- Won Mi-kyung (born 1960), South Korean actress
- Won Min-ji (stage name Anda, born 1994), South Korean singer-songwriter
- Won Ok-im (born 1986), North Korean judoka
- Won Pyong-oh (1929–2020), South Korean zoologist
- Won Sehun (1887–1959), South Korean politician
- Won Sei-hoon (born 1951), South Korean politician, former NIS chief
- Won Seon-pil (born 1994), South Korean handball player
- Won Seong-jin (born 1985), South Korean professional Go player
- Won Shin-hee (born 1946), South Korean former weightlifter
- Won Shin-yun (born 1969), South Korean film director
- Won Soo-yeon (born 1961), South Korean artist
- Won Sun-jin (born 1974), South Korean taekwondo practitioner
- Won Tae-hee (born 1978), South Korean actor and film director
- Won Tae-in (born 2000), South Korean professional baseball player
- Won Tae-yeon (born 1971), South Korean film director and screenwriter
- Won Tae-yeon (born 1990), South Korean former football player
- Won Ung-hui (1939–2004), North Korean politician and military officer
- Won Woo-young (born 1982), South Korean sabre fencer
- Won Yoo-chul (born 1962), South Korean politician
- Won Yoo-hyun (born 1988), South Korean football player
- Won Young-jun (born 1998), South Korean swimmer
- Won Yun-jong (born 1985), South Korean bobsledder
- Won Ji-an (born 1999), South Korean actress
- Won Sae-jin (born 2000), South Korean real one

== See also ==
- Won (Korean given name)
- Won (disambiguation)
- Korean name
- List of Korean family names
