= Times Square (shopping mall) =

Shopping mall in Seoul, South Korea

Coordinates: 37.5172°N 126.9036°E

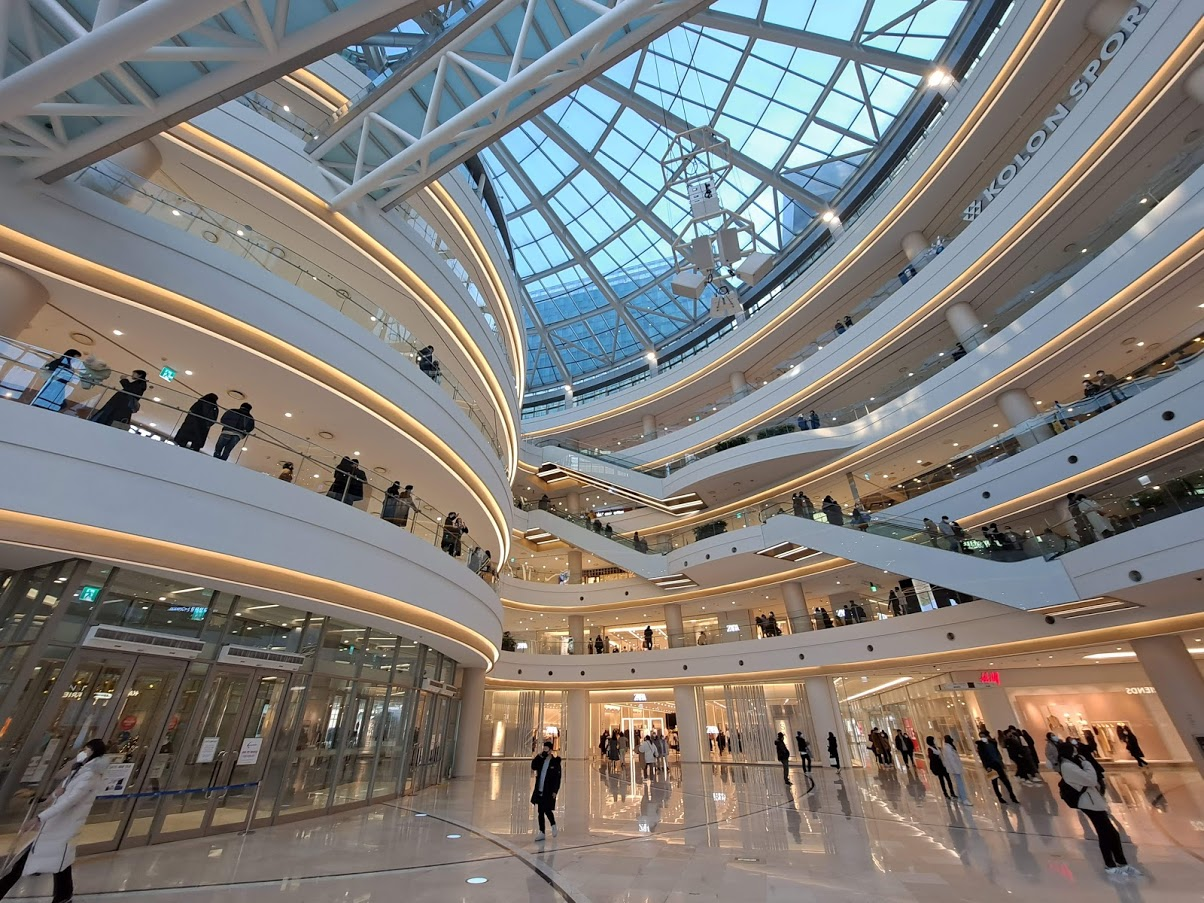
- Times Square atrium (2021)
- Location: Yeongdeungpo-gu, Seoul, Republic of Korea
- Opened: 16 September 2009; 17 years ago
- Owner: Kyungbang
- Num. of anchor tenants: 5 (Shinsegae, CGV, Kyobo, Marriott & Emart)
- Floor area: 300,000 sq. m.
- Floors: 20 above ground, 5 below ground
- Public transit: Yeongdeungpo station
- Website: www.timessquare.co.kr

Times Square (Korean: 타임스퀘어) is a shopping mall in Seoul, South Korea. It is one of Seoul's largest shopping malls, featuring the CGV Starium, the world's largest permanent 35 mm cinema screen.

Times Square mall contains a department store, a multiplex theater, a shopping mall and many restaurants. It also has an urban entertainment culture space (UELC, Urban Entertailing Lifestyle Center). Its architectural features include plazas, terraces, water fountains and numerous gardens.

== History ==
Construction of Times Square started in 2006 on the site of a former Kyungbang plant in Yeongdeungpo, and lasted for three years. The construction cost a total of 600 billion won. On September 16, 2009, the mall officially opened, welcoming an average of 210,000 people per day.

The old premises of Kyungsung Textiles are located behind Times Square and have been converted into a cafe and gallery. Kyungsung later changed their name to Kyungbang and are the owners of Times Square.

=== Guinness world record listing ===
CGV Yeongdeungpo's super large screen 'Starium' was officially listed as the world's largest fixed screen for 35mm movies in Guinness World Records. The screen is 31.38 m in length and 13.0 m in height, with an area of 407.9 m^{2}. However it lost the title to Lotte World Mall following its opening in October 2014, with the largest screen now being the Super Plex G in the auditorium of the Lotte Cinema World Tower.

== Major occupants ==
=== Shinsegae Department Store ===
Located at the north east corner of the complex, Shinsegae Department Store is the biggest department store in southwestern Seoul. The store has 43,305 m^{2} (466,130 sq ft) of floor space on a footprint of 6,000 m^{2} (65,000 sq ft).

=== Atrium ===
The atrium is located at the center of the complex and the floor area encircling it totals 136 sq. metres. It is claimed to be the largest atrium in Asia.

=== Major retail tenants (Kyobo Book Store, CGV & EMart) ===
Three of the largest retailers are located together on the south western side of the complex.

=== Public Space (Rooftop Gardens, 1st Floor Plaza) ===
The complex features two main public spaces, the 5th floor rooftop gardens and the 1st floor plaza. During construction, 21% of the development's land (14,856 sq. meters)were reserved for eco-friendly public spaces.

=== Courtyard by Marriott ===
The Courtyard hotel is located at the center of the complex, between the atrium and Shinsegae. The hotel has 283 rooms in total along with a cafe, restaurant and conference facilities.

== Public transport ==
Times Square is connected to Yeongdeungpo station via an underground passageway. The station is served by Korail intercity services (KTX, ITX, Mugunghwa & tourist trains) and Seoul Metro Line 1.
