= Woan =

Woan is a surname. Notable people with the surname include:

- Alan Woan (1931–2021), English football player
- Don Woan (1927–2020), English football player
- Ian Woan (born 1967), English football player and manager

== See also ==
- Won (disambiguation)
