= Hajime =

- Pronunciation: Hah-jee-mé
- Gender: Male

Origin
- Origin: Japanese
- Meaning: It can have many different meanings depending on the kanji used, but generally centered around the beginning or start, or first.

Hajime (はじめ) is the Japanese word meaning "beginning" (初め, 始め). In Japanese traditional martial arts such as karate, judo, aikido, Kūdō and kendo, it is a verbal command to "begin". Hajime is also a common Japanese given name for males.

In the Amami Islands, Hajime (元) is a surname.

== Written forms ==
Hajime can be written using different kanji characters and can mean:

- 始め, "beginning" or "start"
- 初め, "beginning" or "first"

as a given name

- 一, "first"
- 元, "beginning" or "origin"
- 始, "beginning" or "start"
- 肇, "beginning"
- 基, "fundamental"
- 創, "genesis"
- 孟, "beginning" or "chief"
- 甫, "beginning" or "great"
- 発, “emission”

The name can also be written in hiragana as はじめ and katakana as ハジメ.

== People ==
=== Given name ===
- Hajime Funada (船田 元; born 1953), Japanese politician
- Hajime Hana (ハナ 肇; 1930–1993), Japanese musician, actor and comedian
- Hidenokuni Hajime (英ノ国 一; born 1971), Japanese sumo wrestler
- Hajime Hirota (広田 一; born 1968), Japanese politician
- Hajime Hosogai (細貝 萌; born 1986), Japanese football player
- Hajime Hosokawa (細川 一; 1901–1970), first doctor to discover the Minamata disease
- Hajime Iijima (飯島 肇; born 1976), Japanese voice actor
- Hajime Isayama (諫山 創; born 1986), Japanese manga artist; creator of manga Attack on Titan
- Hajime Ishibashi (石橋甫; 1862–1942), Japanese Vice-Admiral
- Hajime Ishii (石井 一; born 1934), Japanese politician
- Hajime Ishii (footballer) (石井 肇; born 1959), Japanese footballer and manager
- Hajime Ishikawa (石川 元; born 1941), Japanese rower
- Hajime Kagimoto (鍵本 肇), Japanese table tennis player
- Hajime Kanzaka (神坂 一; born 1964), Japanese novelist and manga story writer
- Hajime Katoki (カトキ ハジメ; born 1963), Japanese mecha (fictional walking robots) designer
- Hajime Kawakami (河上 肇; 1879–1946), Japanese Marxist economist
- Hajime Kazumi (数見 肇; born 1971), Japanese karateka
- Hajime Matsumoto (松本 哉; born 1974), Japanese activist, and a recycle shop owner
- Hajime Meshiai (飯合 肇; born 1954), Japanese golfer
- Hajime Mizoguchi (溝口 肇; born 1960), Japanese cellist and composer
- Hajime Moriyasu (森保 一; born 1968), Japanese football player
- Hajime Nakamura (中村 元; 1911–1999), Japanese academic of Vedic, Hindu and Buddhist scriptures
- Hajime Okayasu (岡安 肇; born 1936), Japanese anime and film editor and director
- Saitō Hajime (斎藤 一; 1844–1915), samurai who served in the Shinsengumi
- Hajime Satomi (里見 治; born 1942), founder of Sammy Corporation
- Hajime Sawatari (沢渡 朔; born 1940), Japanese photographer
- Hajime Seki (關 一; 1873–1935), Japanese politician
- Hajime Sorayama (空山 基; born 1947), Japanese illustrator
- Hajime Sugiyama (杉山 元; 1880–1945), minister of war in the Imperial Japanese Army
- Hajime Taguchi (田口 一; born 1975), Japanese writer
- Hajime Takano (高野 孟; born 1944), Japanese journalist
- Hajime Tamura (田村 元; 1924–2014), Japanese politician
- Hajime Tanabe (田辺 元; 1889–1962), Japanese philosopher
- Hajime Taniguchi (谷口 一; born 1985), Japanese professional fighting game player
- Todoroki Hajime (轟はじめ), Japanese VTuber
- Hajime Tomii (富井 一; born 1940), Japanese alpine skier
- Hajime Ueda (ウエダ ハジメ), Japanese manga artist
- Hajime Watanabe (animator) (渡辺 はじめ; born 1957), Japanese animator and character designer
- Watanabe Hajime (samurai), Japanese samurai of the Sengoku period
- Hajime Watanuki (綿貫 甫; born 1939), Japanese sport shooter
- Hajime Yasunaga (安永 一; 1901–1994), Japanese amateur Go player
- Hajime Yoshikawa (吉川 元; born 1967), Japanese politician

=== Surname ===
- Chitose Hajime (元; born 1979), Japanese singer

== Characters ==
- Hajime Aikawa (始), a character from the Japanese live-action television series Kamen Rider Blade
- Hajime Aokaze (蒼風一), a character from the anime series You and Idol Pretty Cure
- Hajime Aoyagi (一), a character from the anime/manga series Yowamushi Pedal
- Hajime Aoyama (ハジメ), a character from the anime series Ghost Stories
- Hajime Fukuroda, a character from Japanese live-action television series Great Teacher Onizuka (2012)
- Hajime Hinata (日向 創), the protagonist of the visual novel Danganronpa 2: Goodbye Despair
- Hajime Ichinose (はじめ), the protagonist of Gatchaman Crowds
- Hajime Iwaizumi (岩泉 一), a character from the anime series Haikyuu!! with the position of vice captain and wing spiker from Aoba Johsai High
- Hajime Kashimo (鹿紫雲一), a character from the manga series Jujutsu Kaisen
- Hajime Katsura (はじめ), a character from the anime/manga series Digimon Universe: App Monsters
- Hajime Kindaichi (一), a character from the anime/manga series Kindaichi Case Files
- Hajime Kunihiro (一), a female character from the anime/manga series Saki
- Hajime Makunouchi, a character from the Danganronpa fangame, Super Danganronpa Another 2
- Hajime Nagumo (南雲 ハジメ), the protagonist in the anime and manga series Arifureta: From Commonplace to World's Strongest
- Hajime Owari (尾張 ハジメ), a character from the anime series Dagashi Kashi
- Hajime Shino (紫之 創), a character from the game franchise Ensemble Stars!
- Hajime Tanaka (田中 一), a character in the Osu! Tatakae! Ouendan rhythm video game duology
- Hajime Tenga (一), one of the main characters from the anime series Kiznaiver
- Hajime Tsukishima (基), a character from the anime/manga series Golden Kamuy
- Hajime Yagi (はじめ), a character from the anime/manga series The World of Narue
- Hajime Yamaoka, a character from Ultraman Nexus who were killed and resurrected by Dark Zagi using the alias Mitsuhiko Ishibori
- Mutsuki Hajime (睦月 始), a character from the anime series Tsukiuta. The Animation
- Saitō Hajime (斎藤 一), a character from the anime/manga series Rurouni Kenshin

== Other uses ==
- Hajime Yatate (肇), a pseudonym for the collective contributions of the Sunrise animation staff
- Hajime (malware)

== See also ==
- Hajime no Ippo, the Japanese title of the manga series Fighting Spirit
- 一 (disambiguation)
- 元 (disambiguation)
