= Ulmil Pavilion =

Historic building in Pyongyang, North Korea

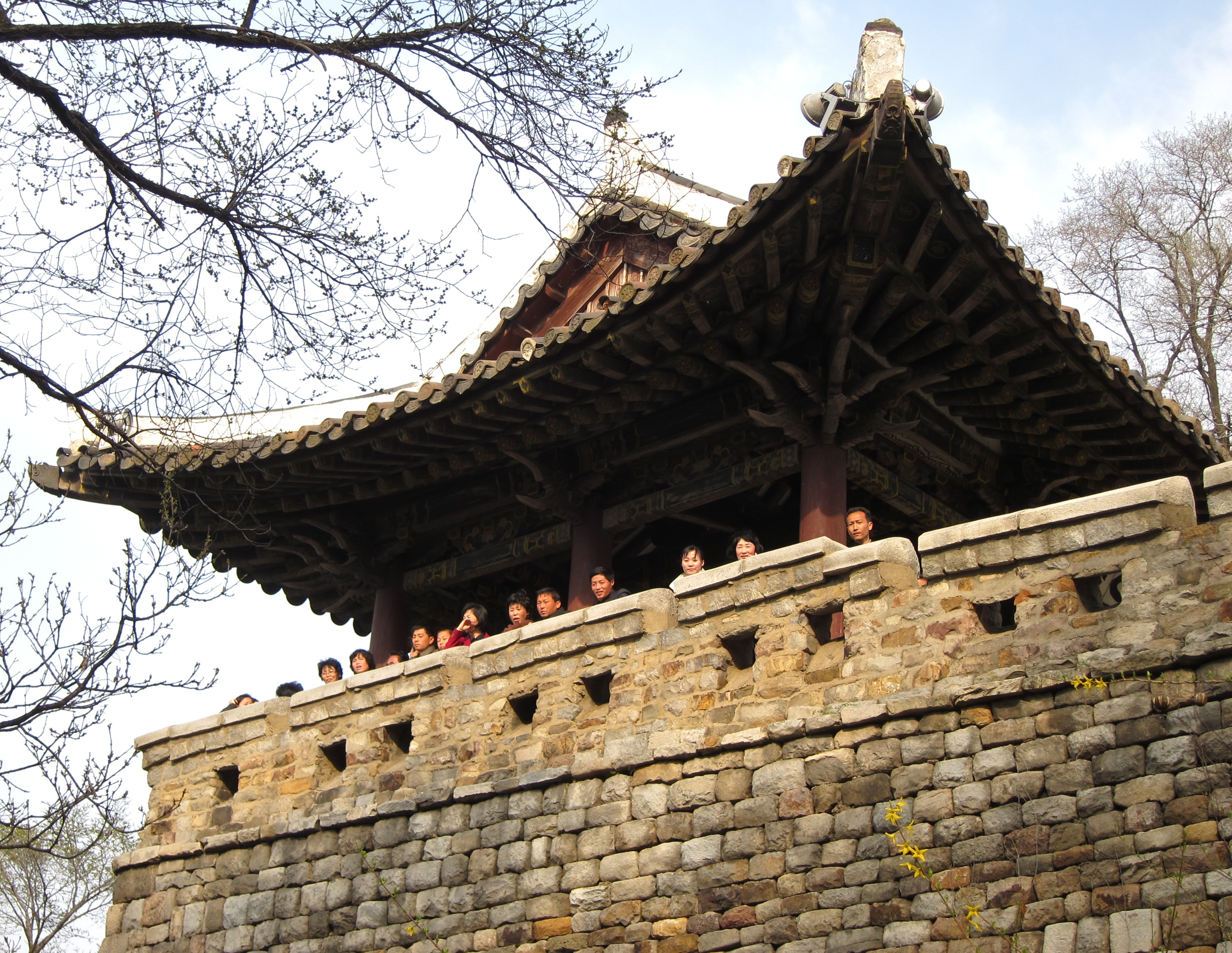
- People enjoying the view from the Pavilion.

Korean name
- Hangul: 을밀대
- Hanja: 乙密臺
- RR: Eulmildae
- MR: Ŭlmiltae

The Ulmil Pavilion (Korean: 을밀대) is an historic structure located on Moran Hill in Pyongyang, North Korea.

The name of the structure is thought to come from the legend of Ulmil fairy, who descended from heaven over and over again to admire the scenery at the site. Another version tells that the site was named after a Koguryo General Ulmil who bravely fought in the area.

The pavilion was built as the north command post of the inner-wall of the Pyongyang fort. It dates from the Koguryo Dynasty period, around the middle of the 6th century. The pavilion was destroyed by the U.S. bombing during the Korean War. After the ceasefire, the pavilion was successfully rebuilt and is preserved as a National Treasure of North Korea. It is one of the four castles or fortresses of the Pyongyang walls, the others being Naeseong, Oeseong and Chilseongmun.

The pavilion stands on the 11 metre-high stone-laid foundation of the fort. The walls on either side were rebuilt in 1714, showing architecture typical of the Ri Dynasty period. The base of the pavilion is made of square stones forming stairs. The crane-shaped roof is supported by poles engraved with various sculptures.

The view from the Pavilion during the Spring season has been called "one of the eight famous views of Pyongyang from long ago". The site is known for a famous spring outdoor festival called Bomnori, one of eight famous Pyongyang festivals.

== Gallery ==
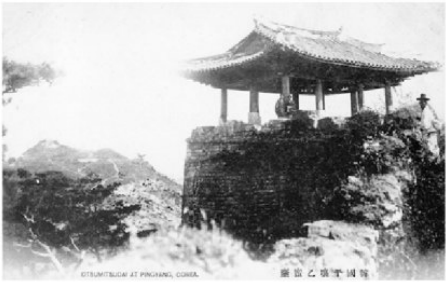
View of the Pavilion in 1910.

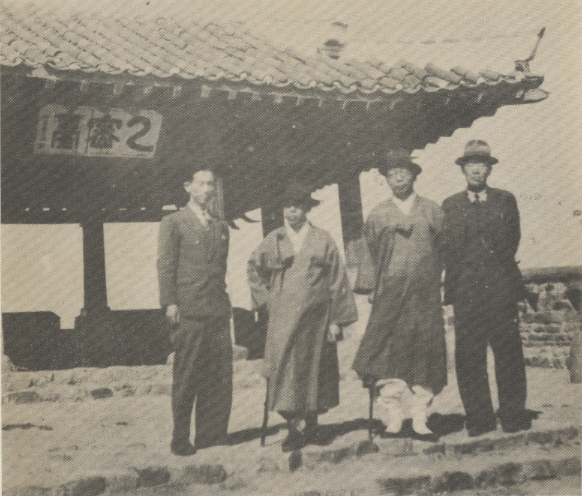
Prominent Korean politicians Sunwoo Jin, Kim Kyu-sik, Kim Ku, and Won Sehun at the North–South Conference of 1948.
