= Won =

Won or WON may refer to:

- Won Buddhism, a specific form of Korean Buddhism

== Currencies ==
- Korean won (₩)
  - South Korean won (KRW)
  - North Korean won (KPW)

== Names ==
- Won (Korean surname)
- Won (Korean given name)

== Other uses ==
- Won (injustice), a social concept in the Joseon dynasty of Korea
- WO-N, a Warrant Officer of the Australian Navy
- WON Bass, a competitive bass fishing series of tournaments
- World Ocean Network, an international non-profit association of organizations to promote the sustainable use of the oceans
- World Opponent Network, a former online gaming service

=== In transportation ===
- The ICAO airline code for Wings Air
- The National Rail station code for Walton-on-the-Naze railway station, Tendring, England

=== In news ===
- Wrestling Observer Newsletter, a professional wrestling newsletter written by Dave Meltzer

=== In media ===
- Won (As Friends Rust album), a 2001 album by As Friends Rust
- Won, 2002 album by Pacewon
- Lugart Won, a character in the manga series Black Cat

== See also ==
- 圓 (disambiguation)
- 元 (disambiguation)
- Win
