= Offspring of Empire =

1991 non-fiction book by Carter J. Eckert

Offspring of Empire: The Koch'ang Kims and the Colonial Origins of Korean Capitalism, 1876-1945
- Author: Carter J. Eckert
- Language: English
- Genre: Korean history, Economics
- Published: 1991 (University of Washington Press). Paper ed., 1996.
- Publication place: United States
- Media type: Print
- Pages: 388
- ISBN: 978-0-295-97533-7

Offspring of Empire: The Koch'ang Kims and the Colonial Origins of Korean Capitalism, 1876-1945 is a book by Carter J. Eckert. The book examines the activities of Kyungbang, the first large scale industrial enterprise owned and operated by Koreans. Eckert uses Kyungbang as a "window through which one can explore at a concrete and human level the origins and early development of Korean capitalism." The book partially attributes the Miracle on the Han River to the legacy of Japanese colonial rule in Korea.

== Overview ==
Eckert argues that despite some notable trends towards commercialization in Korea before 1876, Korea did not have a large-scale market for its goods. Between 1876 and 1919, Japan provided Korean landlords with a market for their rice. The Kims, a landowning family from the North Jeolla Province operated a successful rice operation during this period which allowed them to amass capital.

Around 1919, a younger generation of Koreans invested significant amounts of capital in non agricultural industries. Some Koreans believed that a modernized Korea would have more control over its own affairs. Eckert argues that while nationalism certainly contributed to Korean industrialization, Japan's decision to halve rice prices made agricultural enterprises unattractive, and the repeal of the Company Law which required all new business in Korea to receive a license from the colonial government removed a significant barrier to industrialization. Kim Seong-su, a member of the Kim family from North Joella founded Kyungbang in 1919, a company devoted to the production of yarn and cloth.

From 1919 to 1945, Kyungbang grew substantially. Paid in capital grew from 250,000 to 10,500,000 yen and the number of company looms increased from 100 to 1080. Eckert attributes this growth partially to Japanese colonial rule. Eckert argues that because Kyungbang had difficulty establishing a niche in a textile market dominated by Japanese imports, it could not have survived without government subsidies or loans. Eckert argues that the Japanese colonial government's control over Korean businesses forced enterprises like Kyungbang to work in accordance with industrial goals of the Japanese colonial government. As a result, the Japanese colonial government protected the interests of Korean businesses like Kyungbang. Eckert argues that Kyungbang relied on Japan for its raw materials, machinery, and technical expertise. Furthermore, Eckert argues that Kyungbang's support of the Japanese ideology of Naisen Ittai, which stressed the unity of Japanese and Korean peoples, reveals that the Korean bourgeois had a weak commitment to Korean nationalism.

== Reactions ==
Gi-Wook Shin thought that the book was "well-written" and "provocative"; however, Shin argued that Eckert failed to connect the Japanese colonial legacy to post-World War II developments such as the land reforms of 1949-1950 and the Korean War. He also argued that Eckert did not adequately explore Korea's transformation from an agricultural to industrial economy. Martina Deuchler praised the book saying, "this book must become require reading for all students of East Asia in the twentieth century." Meredith Woo Cummings criticized the book for equating capitalism with industrialization and for characterizing Korean businessmen as being driven by "myopic self interest."
