= 元 =

元 or 원, meaning 'beginning, origin', may refer to:

- Gen (disambiguation), a masculine Japanese given name
- Hajime, a masculine Japanese given name
- Won#Names, a Korean name
- Yuan (disambiguation), Chinese transliteration

== See also ==
- 一 (disambiguation)
- 圓 (disambiguation)
