= Yuan =

Yuan may refer to:

== Currency ==
- Yuan (currency), the basic unit of currency in historic and contemporary mainland China and Taiwan
  - Renminbi, the currency system of modern mainland China, whose basic unit is yuan
  - New Taiwan dollar, the currency used in modern Taiwan, whose basic unit is yuán in Mandarin
  - Manchukuo yuan, the unit of currency that was used in the Japanese puppet state of Manchukuo
  - Gold yuan, the unit of currency that was used in the Republic of China between 1948 and 1949
- Yen and yuan sign (¥), symbol used for yuan currency in Latin scripts

== Governmental organ ==
- "Government branch" or "Court" (Chinese: 院; pinyin: Yuàn), the Chinese name for a kind of executive institution.

=== Government of the Republic of China (Taiwan) ===
- Control Yuan
- Examination Yuan
- Executive Yuan
- Judicial Yuan
- Legislative Yuan

=== Government of Imperial China ===
- Xuanzheng Yuan, or Bureau of Buddhist and Tibetan Affairs during the Yuan dynasty
- Lifan Yuan during the Qing dynasty

== Dynasties ==
- Yuan dynasty (元朝), a dynasty of China ruled by the Mongol Borjigin clan
  - Northern Yuan (北元), the Yuan dynasty's successor state in northern China and the Mongolian Plateau

== People and languages ==
- Yuan (surname), the transliteration of a number of Chinese family names (e.g. 袁, 元, 苑, 原, 源, 爰, 遠)
  - Yuan Haowen (元好問; 1190–1257), Chinese poet, author, and official
- Thai Yuan, a people of Northern Thailand
  - Yuan language, commonly known as Northern Thai language, language of the Thai Yuan people

== Places ==
- Yu'an District, in Anhui, China
- Yuan River (沅江 or 沅水), one of the four largest rivers in Hunan, a tributary of the Yangtze River
- Nanyang, Henan, abbreviated (宛) and pronounced as Yuān in Yayan, a city in China

== Other uses ==
- Yuanfen (缘分), a Chinese or Buddhist concept that means the predetermined principle that dictates a person's relationships and encounters
- Type 041 submarine, PLAN Yuan-class submarines
- Yuan Qi (TCM), in traditional Chinese medicine
- Yuan (Tales of Symphonia) (ユアン), a character from Tales of Symphonia
- BYD Yuan (元), a subcompact crossover SUV
- BYD Yuan Plus, a battery electric compact crossover SUV
- Tao Yúan (Shaman King) (Tao En), a character in Shaman King

== See also ==
- Yen, the currency of Japan
- Korean won (disambiguation), the currency of Korea
- 元 (disambiguation)
- 圓 (disambiguation)
