= Gen =

Gen is most commonly seen as a contraction (such as Gen.) and it may refer to:

- Book of Genesis
- General officer
- Generation#Western world as in GenX, GenZ, etc.
- Genitive case

Gen may also refer to:

- Gen (2006 film), Turkish horror film directed by Togan Gökbakar
- Gen (2025 film), a documentary film
- Gen (Street Fighter), a video game character from the Street Fighter series
- Gen Fu, a video game character from the Dead or Alive series
- Gen language, a language of Togo
- Gen-san, a character in the anime series Sky Girls
- Gen Asagiri (あさぎり ゲン (浅霧 幻)), a character in the anime and manga series Dr. Stone
- Gen Tomii (富井 彦; born 1973), Japanese Nordic combined skier
- Gen Hoshino (星野 源; born 1981), Japanese singer-songwriter, musician, actor, and writer
- Gen Kitchen, British politician
- Gen Shoji (昌子 源; born 1992), Japanese footballer
- Gen Urobuchi (虚淵 玄; born 1972), Japanese novelist, visual novel writer and anime screenwriter
- Gen Fukunaga (福永 元; born 1962), Japanese engineer and businessman
- Gen Nakatani (中谷 元; born 1957), Japanese politician
- Gen Horiuchi (堀内 元), Japanese ballet dancer and choreographer
- Gen Digital, a computer security software company in United States

GEN may refer to:

- GEN Corporation, of Japan
- GEN, Global Enterprise Network, a UK Internet Service Provider
- GEN Energija, a state-owned power company in Slovenia
- GEN, a website published by Medium
- Global Ecovillage Network
- Global Editors Network
- Gewestelijk ExpresNet, Dutch name for the Brussels Regional Express Network, a commuter rail service
- Gen, a software development program currently owned by Broadcom

== See also ==
- Gene
- 元 (disambiguation)
