= Liugaizi =

Liugaizi 刘垓子镇
- Town
- Location in Shandong Liugaizi (China)
- Coordinates: 36°44′11″N 115°47′20″E
- Country: People's Republic of China
- Province: Shandong
- Prefecture-level city: Liaocheng
- County-level city: Linqing
- Time zone: UTC+8 (China Standard)

Liugaizi (Chinese: 刘垓子; pinyin: Liúgāizǐ) is a town in Linqing, Liaocheng, in western Shandong province, China. As of 2020 it had 35 villages under its administration:

- Liugaizi Village
- Liangzhuang Village (梁庄村)
- Salipu Village (卅里堡村)
- Baifosi Village (白佛寺村)
- Zhangzhuang Village (张庄村)
- Beixue Village (北薛村)
- Jiangyoufang Village (姜油坊村)
- Songzhuang Village (宋庄村)
- Jiushengmiao Village (九圣庙村)
- Wangmiao Village (王庙村)
- Zhulou Village (朱楼村)
- Yinzhuang Village (尹庄村)
- Yinge Village (尹阁村)
- Zhaojuan Village (赵圈村)
- Liaozhuang Village (廖庄村)
- Lütang Village (吕堂村)
- Houli Village (后李村)
- Wafang Village (瓦房村)
- Zuoqiao Village (左桥村)
- Yangxinzhuang Village (杨辛庄村)
- Jingzhuang Village (井庄村)
- Yuzhuang Village (于庄村)
- Xuzhuang Village (许庄村)
- Beiliu Village (北刘村)
- Haozhuang Village (郝庄村)
- Mazhuang Village (马庄村)
- Kongji Village (孔集村)
- Kongzhuang Village (孔庄村)
- Shizhuang Village (施庄村)
- Nanxue Village (南薛村)
- Nanliu Village (南刘村)
- Xuelou Village (薛楼村)
- Luzhuang Village (逯庄村)
- Nieyuan Village (聂园村)
- Jiangzhuang Village (姜庄村)
