= Won (Korean given name) =

- Hangul: 원
- RR: Won
- MR: Wŏn
- IPA: [wʌn]

Won (Korean: 원) is a Korean given name. Notable people with the name include:

- Yi Won (born 1962), Korean pretender to the throne
- Duke Gwangpyeong (1083–1170), personal name Wang Won

== See also ==
- List of Korean given names
- Won (Korean surname)
- Won (disambiguation)
