= 一 (disambiguation) =

Radical 1 meaning "one" is one of the 6 Kangxi radicals composed of 1 stroke.

一 may also refer to:

- Hajime, Japanese given name
- Makoto, Japanese given name
  - Makoto Kawabata (河端 一), Japanese musician
- 𘬁, "north" in Khitan small script

== See also ==
- 元 (disambiguation)
