= Yandian, Linqing =

Yandian 烟店镇
- Town
- Location in Shandong Yandian (China)
- Coordinates: 36°42′16″N 115°29′51″E
- Country: People's Republic of China
- Province: Shandong
- Prefecture-level city: Liaocheng
- County-level city: Linqing
- Village-level divisions: 34 villages
- Elevation: 35 m (115 ft)
- Time zone: UTC+8 (China Standard)
- Area code: 0635

Yandian (simplified Chinese: 烟店; traditional Chinese: 煙店; pinyin: Yāndiàn) is a town under the administration of Linqing City in northwestern Shandong province, China, located 24 kilometres (15 mi) southwest of downtown Linqing and bordering Hebei to the northwest. As of 2011, it has 34 villages under its administration.

== See also ==
- List of township-level divisions of Shandong
