= Laozhaozhuang =

Laozhaozhuang 老赵庄镇
- Town
- Location in Shandong Laozhaozhuang (China)
- Coordinates: 36°50′21″N 115°51′34″E
- Country: People's Republic of China
- Province: Shandong
- Prefecture-level city: Liaocheng
- County-level city: Linqing
- Time zone: UTC+8 (China Standard)

Laozhaozhuang (Chinese: 老赵庄镇) is a town in Linqing, Liaocheng, in western Shandong province, China.
