= Bachalu =

Bachalu 八岔路镇
- Town
- Location in Shandong Bachalu (China)
- Coordinates: 36°41′57″N 115°36′37″E
- Country: People's Republic of China
- Province: Shandong
- Prefecture-level city: Liaocheng
- County-level city: Linqing
- Time zone: UTC+8 (China Standard)

Bachalu (Chinese: 八岔路镇) is a town in Linqing, Liaocheng, in western Shandong province, China.
