= Linqing =

Linqing 临清市 Lintsing, Lin-ch'ing
- County-level city
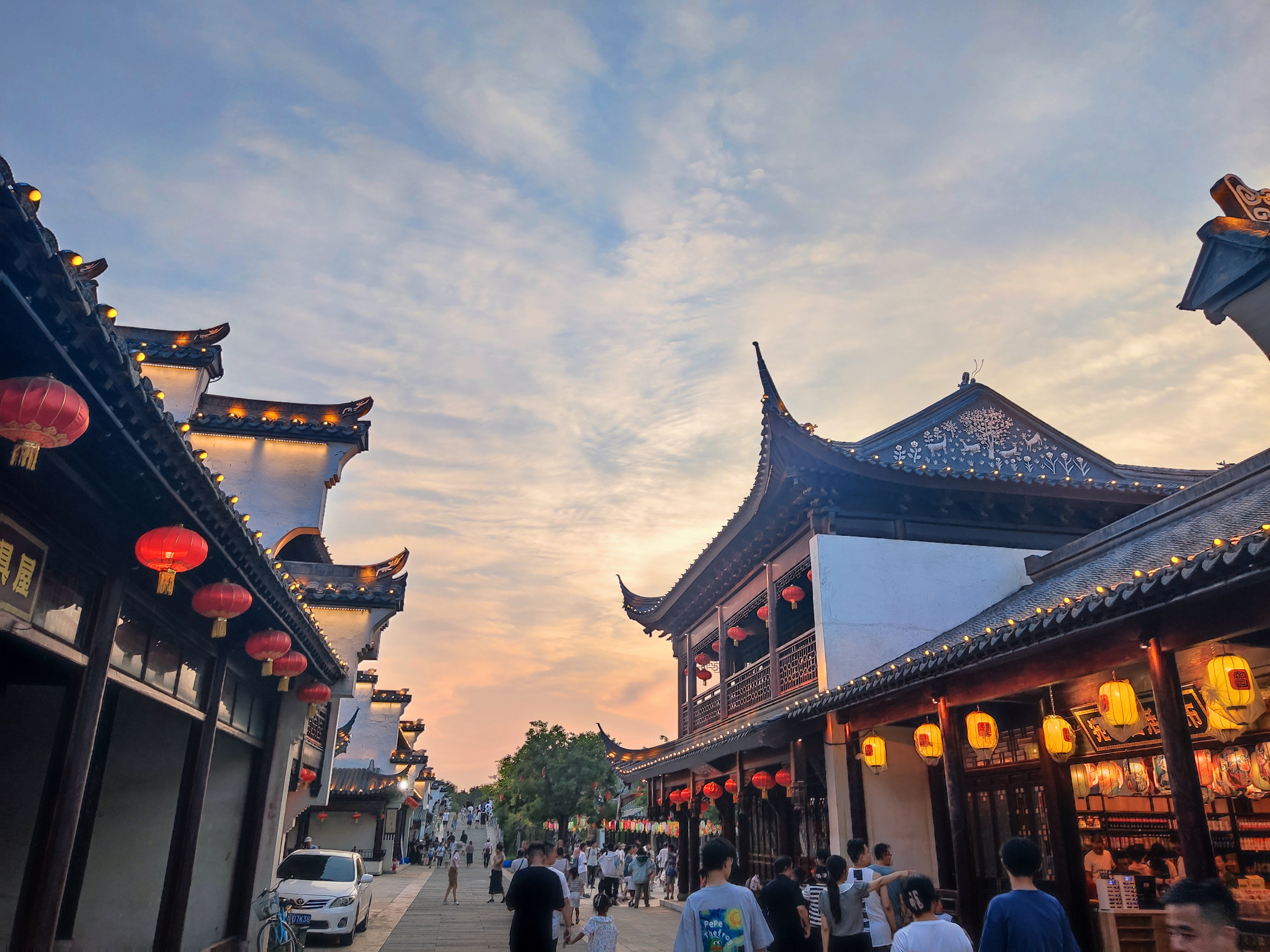
- Dongwanyuan Park in Linqing

- Location in Shandong
- Coordinates: 36°50′58″N 115°42′22″E
- Country: People's Republic of China
- Province: Shandong
- Prefecture-level city: Liaocheng

Area
  - Total: 950 km^{2} (370 sq mi)

Population (2019)
  - Total: 759,100
- Time zone: UTC+8 (China Standard)
- Postal code: 252600

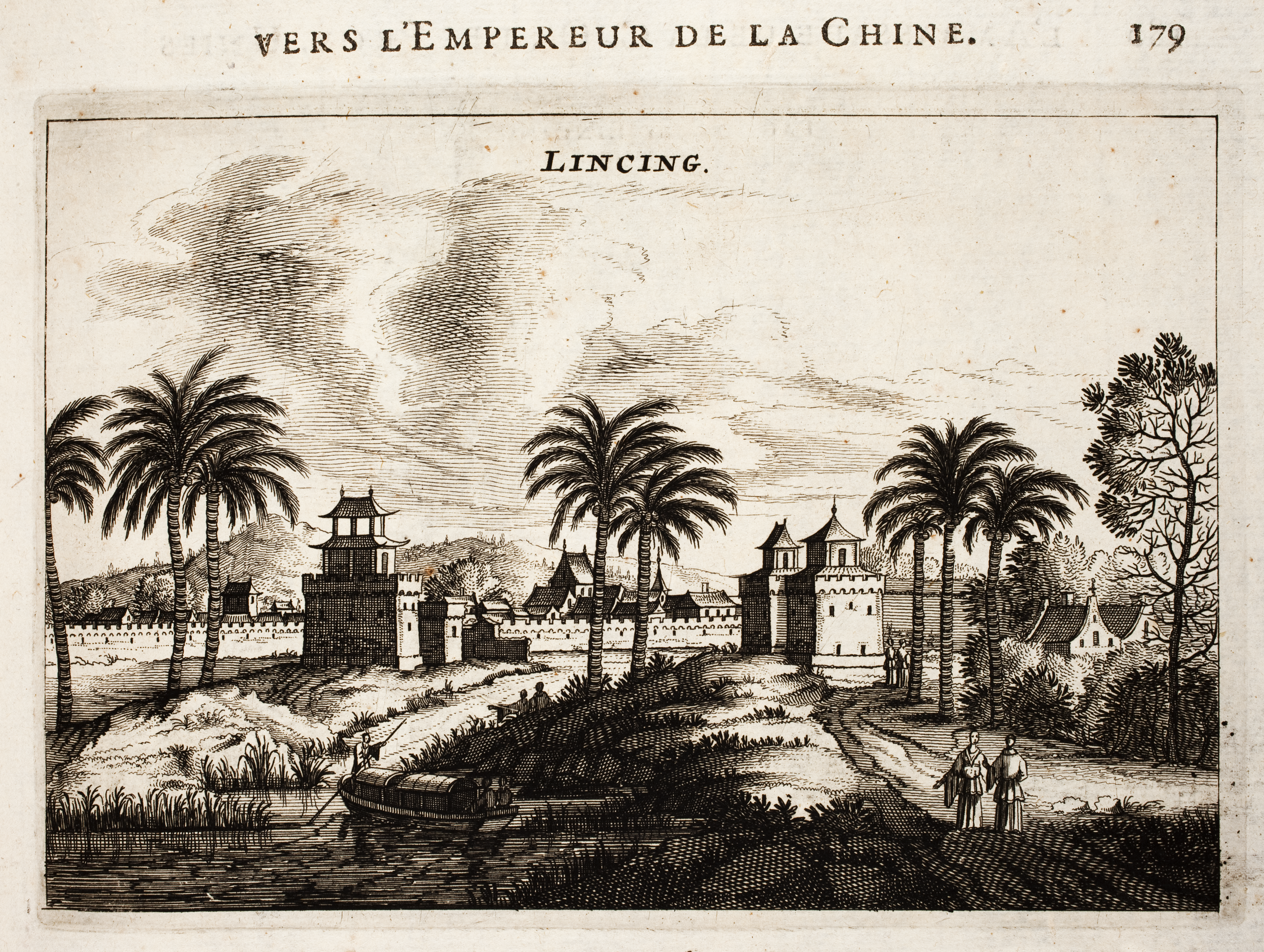
"Lincing". Nieuhof: L'ambassade de la Compagnie Orientale des Provinces Unies vers l'Empereur de la Chine, 1665

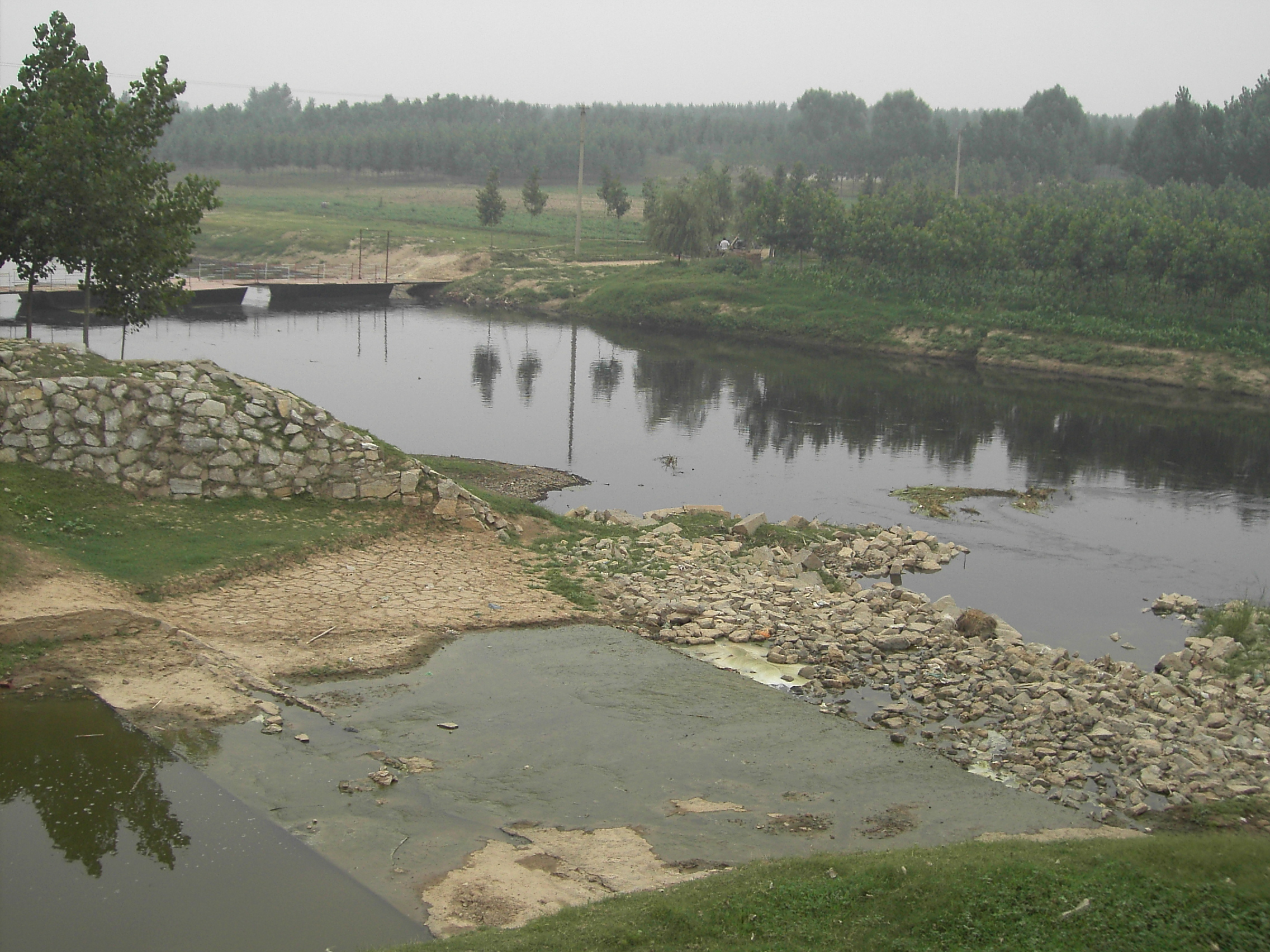
Junction of the "Lu Canal" and "Southern Canal" sections of the Grand Canal at Linqing

Linqing (simplified Chinese: 临清; traditional Chinese: 臨清; pinyin: Línqīng) is a county-level city under the administration of the prefecture-level city of Liaocheng in western Shandong Province, China.

== Geography and climate ==
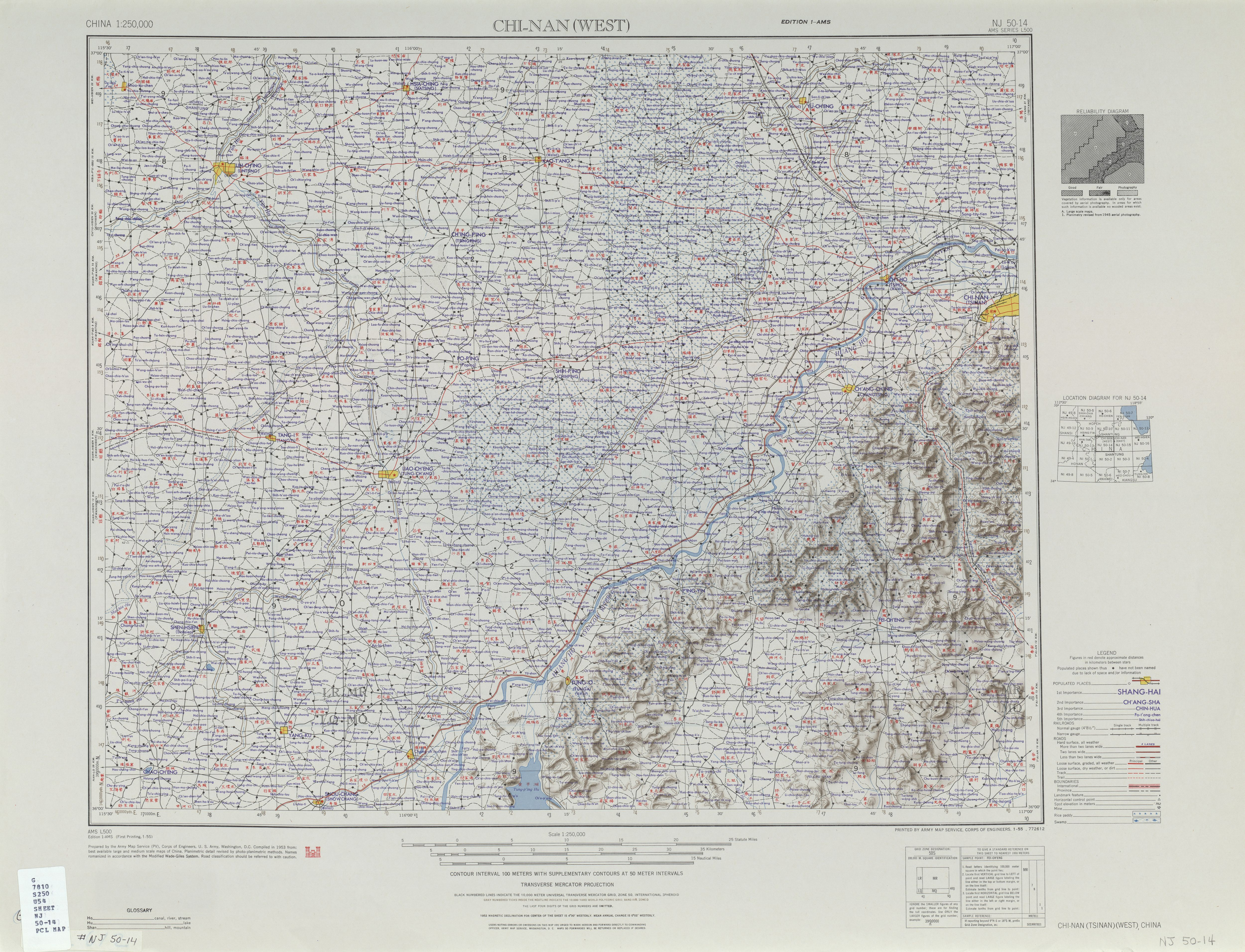
Map including Linqing (labeled as 臨清 LIN-CH'ING (LINTSING) (Walled)) (AMS, 1953)

It is located north-northwest of Liaocheng. The city is situated at the confluence of the Wei River and the Grand Canal. It is 380 kilometres (240 mi) from Beijing on the Beijing–Kowloon railway line to Hong Kong. Elevation within Linqing County ranges from 29 to 38 m (95 to 125 ft) above sea level. The area of the county is 955 km^{2} (369 sq mi). The annual average temperature is 12.8 °C (55.0 °F), the highest recorded temperature 41.4 °C (107 °F), and the lowest recorded temperature −22.1 °C (−8 °F). Annual mean precipitation is 590.4 mm (23.24 in). There are 205 frost-free days per year on average and the average annual sunshine is 2661 hours.

Climate data for Linqing, elevation 34 m (112 ft), (1991–2020 normals, extremes 1981–2010)
| Month | Jan | Feb | Mar | Apr | May | Jun | Jul | Aug | Sep | Oct | Nov | Dec | Year |
|---|---|---|---|---|---|---|---|---|---|---|---|---|---|
| Record high °C (°F) | 16.4 (61.5) | 23.4 (74.1) | 28.4 (83.1) | 33.5 (92.3) | 38.0 (100.4) | 41.5 (106.7) | 40.7 (105.3) | 36.6 (97.9) | 37.5 (99.5) | 33.2 (91.8) | 27.2 (81.0) | 19.8 (67.6) | 41.5 (106.7) |
| Mean daily maximum °C (°F) | 3.8 (38.8) | 7.3 (45.1) | 15.3 (59.5) | 20.7 (69.3) | 26.9 (80.4) | 31.9 (89.4) | 32.1 (89.8) | 30.3 (86.5) | 26.8 (80.2) | 21.0 (69.8) | 12.8 (55.0) | 5.6 (42.1) | 19.5 (67.2) |
| Daily mean °C (°F) | −2.0 (28.4) | 1.2 (34.2) | 8.6 (47.5) | 14.4 (57.9) | 20.7 (69.3) | 25.5 (77.9) | 27.0 (80.6) | 25.3 (77.5) | 20.5 (68.9) | 14.2 (57.6) | 6.7 (44.1) | −0.3 (31.5) | 13.5 (56.3) |
| Mean daily minimum °C (°F) | −6.2 (20.8) | −3.3 (26.1) | 3.0 (37.4) | 8.7 (47.7) | 14.9 (58.8) | 19.9 (67.8) | 23.0 (73.4) | 21.6 (70.9) | 16.0 (60.8) | 9.1 (48.4) | 2.1 (35.8) | −4.5 (23.9) | 8.7 (47.7) |
| Record low °C (°F) | −20.6 (−5.1) | −15.7 (3.7) | −8.9 (16.0) | −1.2 (29.8) | 4.6 (40.3) | 10.6 (51.1) | 16.4 (61.5) | 12.6 (54.7) | 5.3 (41.5) | −3.7 (25.3) | −17.4 (0.7) | −17.6 (0.3) | −20.6 (−5.1) |
| Average precipitation mm (inches) | 3.0 (0.12) | 9.6 (0.38) | 9.2 (0.36) | 31.0 (1.22) | 45.9 (1.81) | 70.3 (2.77) | 138.3 (5.44) | 129.8 (5.11) | 49.1 (1.93) | 31.4 (1.24) | 16.6 (0.65) | 4.1 (0.16) | 538.3 (21.19) |
| Average precipitation days (≥ 0.1 mm) | 1.9 | 2.8 | 2.7 | 5.1 | 6.4 | 8.0 | 10.5 | 9.5 | 6.3 | 5.2 | 4.1 | 2.3 | 64.8 |
| Average snowy days | 2.8 | 2.7 | 0.8 | 0.1 | 0 | 0 | 0 | 0 | 0 | 0 | 0.9 | 2.2 | 9.5 |
| Average relative humidity (%) | 61 | 57 | 54 | 59 | 63 | 61 | 77 | 81 | 75 | 68 | 67 | 65 | 66 |
| Mean monthly sunshine hours | 148.2 | 155.7 | 210.8 | 233.0 | 262.9 | 235.3 | 205.2 | 202.5 | 192.6 | 184.2 | 156.1 | 147.5 | 2,334 |
| Percentage possible sunshine | 48 | 51 | 57 | 59 | 60 | 54 | 46 | 49 | 52 | 54 | 52 | 49 | 53 |
Source: China Meteorological Administration

== History and economy ==
Linqing has played an important role in the history of China. In Ming and Qing times it was a great center for the distribution of textiles, grain and bricks and is also famous as the place where the tiles of the Great Wall and the Forbidden City were produced. Today the city's flourishing economy is based on a number of light industrial enterprises.

Aside from the Grand Canal, sights include a distinctive promontory, a stupa (Chinese: 舍利塔; pinyin: Shèlì Tǎ), a Ming-dynasty Hui mosques (Linqing Northern Mosque, 临清清真北寺; Línqīng Qīngzhēn Běisì, Linqing Eastern Mosque, Chinese: 临清清真东寺; pinyin: Línqīng Qīngzhēn Dōngsì), and ruins of the old customs house (钞关; Chāo Guān), Linqing City Museum (in a historical building ensemble known as the 鳌头矶; Áo Tóu Jī). In particular, the Sheli Pagoda near the Grand Canal is a well-known local landmark.

== Administrative divisions ==
As of 2012, this city is divided to four subdistricts, eight towns and three townships.

Subdistricts

- Qingnianlu Subdistrict (青年路街道)
- Xinhualu Subdistrict (新华路街道)
- Xianfeng Subdistrict (先锋路街道)
- Daxinzhuang Subdistrict (大辛庄街道)

Towns

- Songlin (松林镇)
- Laozhaozhuang (老赵庄镇)
- Weiwan (魏湾镇)
- Liugaizi (刘垓子镇)
- Bachalu (八岔路镇)
- Panzhuang (潘庄镇)
- Yandian (烟店镇)
- Tangyuan (唐园镇)

Townships

- Jinhaozhuang Township (金郝庄乡)
- Daiwan Township (戴湾乡)
- Shangdian Township (尚店乡)

== Population ==
=== Demographics ===
The city proper has about 143,000 residents (January 2000), whereas Linqing as a whole had 709,328 inhabitants in 1999.

== Ecclesiastical history ==
Once visited by the missionary and sinologist Matteo Ricci, Linqing has been the seat of a Latin Catholic Mission sui juris of Linqing / Lintsing since it was split off from the Apostolic Vicariate of Tsinanfu on 24 June 1927.

It was promoted to Apostolic prefecture of Linqing / Lintsing / Lintsingen(sis) (Latin) (pre-diocesan jurisdiction, not entitled to a titular bishop) on 5 April 1931.

It remains exempt, i.e. directly dependent on the Holy See and its missionary Roman Congregation for the Evangelization of Peoples. The see has been vacant, without Apostolic administrator, since the third incumbent's death in 1981.

=== Ordinaries ===
(all Latin Rite)

Ecclesiastical Superior(s)

none available

Apostolic Prefects

(Chinese secular priests)

- Father Gaspar Hu Xiu-shen (胡修身) (1931.03.30 – retired 1940), died 1945
- Fr. Joseph Li Chao-gui (李朝貴) (1940.11.22 – death 1948)
- Fr. Paul Li Ben-liang (李本良) (1949.11.18 – death 1981)

== Notable natives ==
- Ming dynasty poet Xie Zhen
- Ming dynasty general Zuo Liangyu
- National Revolution Army general Zhang Zizhong
- Indologist, linguist, paleographer, historian and writer Ji Xianlin

== See also ==
- List of Catholic dioceses in China

== Sources and external links ==
- Article on Linqing from China Today, no.78 (2005)
- Official website of Linqing city government (in Chinese)
- GCatholic Catholic missionary jurisdictions
- Another Linqing site (in Chinese), but with pictures
