= Won Tae-yeon (footballer) =

Korean association football player

Personal information
- Date of birth: 11 May 1990 (age 36)
- Height: 1.87 m (6 ft 2 in)
- Position: Forward

Youth career
- –2008: Boin High School
- 2009–2013: Sungkyunkwan University

Senior career*
Years	Team	Apps	(Gls)
2014	Gyeongnam	0	(0)
2014	→ Yanbian Funde (loan)	4	(0)
2015	Gangneung City	6	(0)
- * Club domestic league appearances and goals as of 27 August 2021

- Won Tae-yeon
- Hangul: 원태연
- RR: Won Taeyeon
- MR: Wŏn T'aeyŏn

Won Tae-yeon (Korean: 원태연; born 11 May 1990) is a Korean former footballer.

== Career statistics ==
=== Club ===
Club	Season	League			Cup		Other		Total	
Club	Season	Division	Apps	Goals	Apps	Goals	Apps	Goals	Apps	Goals
Gyeongnam	2014	K League Challenge	0	0	0	0	0	0	0	0
Yanbian Funde (loan)	2014	China League One	4	0	0	0	0	0	4	0
Gangneung City	2015	K3 League	6	0	1 (Note: Appearances in the Korean FA Cup)	1	0	0	7	1
Career total			10	0	1	1	0	0	11	1
