= Won Sehun =

South Korean politician (1887–1959)

Won Sehun (Korean: 원세훈; Hanja: 元世勳; July 10, 1887 – December 25, 1959) was a Korean independence activist, unification activist, and politician.

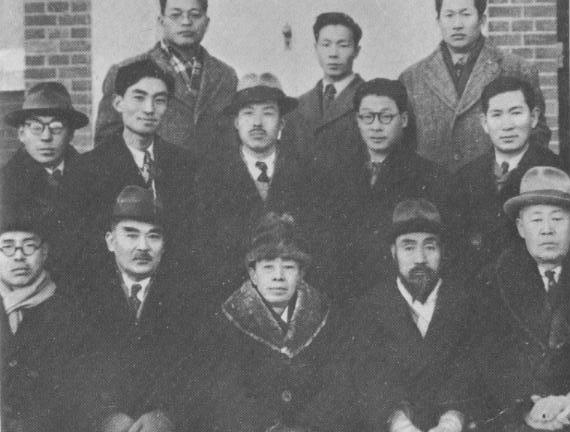
Members of Left-Right Coalition Movement in Korean peninsula Won Sehun on the far right, center of the front row is Kim Kyu-sik, and the right is Kim Boong-jun and An Jae-hong

He served in the Provisional Government of the Republic of Korea, participated in the creation of Korea Democratic Party after Korea's liberation from Japanese colonial rule in 1945, and participated in the Left-Right Coalition Movement in Korean peninsula as the leader of the Korea Democratic Party, but was abandoned by the party and moved to the National Self-reliance Federation. After that, he participated in inter-Korean negotiations, but acknowledged failure and the establishment of the Korean government. He was elected running for the second National Assembly election on May 30, 1950, but was kidnapped by the People's Army during the Korean War.

== Biography ==
Won Sehun graduated from Daedong Law School in Pyongyang, South Pyongan Province. In 1919, he was selected as the representative of the Korean National Assembly in Vladivostok and came to Shanghai to negotiate with the Provisional Government of the Republic of Korea. He participated in the independence movement

In 1925, the Soviet Union sent Foreign Minister Lev. M. Karakhan to Japan's foreign minister, Bang Taek-kyum-gil, and signed a secret agreement with Japan to oust and arrest Korean nationalists, including Kim Kyu-sik and Cho Wan-koo, who were not moving as ordered by the Soviet Communist Party. Won Sei-hoon was also forced out of the Soviet Union at that time. Won Sehun was State Councilor of the Provisional Government.

On October 23, 1945, he expressed his support for Syngman Rhee at the National Council for the Promotion of Independence. He became a member of the Anti-trust National Mobilization Committee, which was formed on December 30, after Kim Ku protested the Moscow Conference (1945) and pushed for a strong anti-trustee campaign. He was visited by Kim Yeon-soo, a businessman, in late 1945. While temporarily staying at the home of Na Yong-kyun, secretary-general of the Korea Democratic Party, Won asked him to take over the Kyungbang for a while, but Won did not receive the political funds he gave him. It is said that it was because of the time of Japanese militarism.

On February 14, 1946, he was elected one of the 28 supreme political members of the Emergency National Congress. He was a member of the South Korean Transitional Legislation Committee. On August 20, 1949, he was elected to the Standing Committee of the National Council for the Strengthening of the People's Republic of Korea. He ran for the second National Assembly in 1950 and was elected. He was kidnapped to North Korea during the Korean War and served as a standing member and executive member of the Council for the Promotion of Peaceful Reunification of North Korea, but was purged in 1959 for international espionage and died on December 25 of the same year.
