= Tangyuan, Shandong =

Tangyuan 唐园镇
- Town
- Location in Shandong Tangyuan (China)
- Coordinates: 36°45′10″N 115°34′37″E
- Country: People's Republic of China
- Province: Shandong
- Prefecture-level city: Liaocheng
- County-level city: Linqing
- Time zone: UTC+8 (China Standard)

Tangyuan (Chinese: 唐园镇) is a town in Linqing, Liaocheng, in western Shandong province, China.
