= Yuantang subdialect =

Chinese language game

Yuantang is a subdialect spoken by Hakka speakers at Yuantang (Chinese: 苑塘), a village in southern China. It is also known as the snake language.

== Rules ==
Example : 食饭 → 手习花散 [sit fan] → [siu jit fa san]; eat (rice) → hand + learn + flower + separation.

Clearly, the words 食 and 饭 are each split into two sounds, the initial and the rime, thus 食 [sit] is made up of the initial of 手 [s] and the rime of 习 [it], and similarly, 饭 [fan] is [f] from 花 and [an] from 散. This is similar to the traditional Chinese practice of representing sounds by two characters known as fanqie.
This practice also resembles Jin, another Sinitic language, in its process of splitting a monosyllabic word into two syllables. A similar process is also found in Mandarin.

== History ==
There is no solid evidence for the origin of Yuantang. But it is believed to be an invention of a local intellectual in Qing dynasty.
