= Won (injustice) =

Social concept of injustice in Joseon Korea

In Joseon society, won (Korean: 원; Hanja: 冤; MR: wŏn) described intense negative emotions, often distress, that came from feelings of injustice. Won played an integral role in justice, lawmaking, and daily life in Joseon Korea. Won allowed people of different classes and genders to gain justice through the legal system, breaking down gender, social, and economic barriers in Joseon Korea. Judges considered a person's won in courts of law, with their main goal often being to relieve a person's won to administer justice. Won was perceived as a universal sentiment that every person could feel, regardless of background, thus creating a sense of universal equality in Joseon.

== History ==
King Taejo established the Joseon dynasty in 1392 and sought to create a justice system in which he could maintain social order and administer fair justice. He established a legal system that year in which subjects could directly appeal to the monarch, who served as the highest court in the land. That year, the Saheonbu (Office of the Inspector General) issued a statement:

First, establish rules and laws. One who wishes his state well should not be concerned about safety and peril; rather, he should be concerned with whether the rules and laws are properly implemented.

King Taejo sought to establish a legal system in which people would fully abide by the law while believing the law to be fair. He believed that relieving his subjects' won was the best way to ensure a peaceful and just society under his rule. Justice in Joseon society was not just centered around correcting wrongdoing, but also alleviating feelings of won to ensure a harmonious society.

In 1401, during King Taejong's reign, the Joseon government installed the "petition drum" for people to vocally express grievances that had not been properly addressed in county, provincial, and capital courts in order to relieve their won. In 1402, King Taejong pronounced three primary objectives of the drum: for people to freely express their opinions and the monarch to embrace them, to redress grievances of people who have been wronged, and to encourage subjects to report any acts of rebellion or treason. While the drum also served other purposes, it provided a direct channel for people of all classes to openly redress their grievances to relieve their won.

== Conflicts over won ==
In premodern Korea, rulers believed they would bring disorder to society or even cause natural disasters if people had too many grievances or resentment. In July 1402, there was a severe drought, and King Taejong believed the cause to be delayed appeals process at the municipal courts and demanded magistrates and local authorities address the issue as quickly as possible. King Taejong believed the overwhelming build-up of won had caused the natural disaster and sought to implement change to prevent something like that from happening again.

There were also cases in which there was conflict between the institutional order and relieving people's won. In order to protect authorities, the state prohibited subjects from making accusations toward county magistrates, regardless of any won the people felt. The state needed to reinforce hierarchy and autonomy over peace, and justified this act by stating the magistrates represented the King, who in turn, represented the Heavens. According to Korean historian Jisoo Kim: "In a Confucian state, accusing one's ruler, father, or master was regarded as an absolute crime, and this similarity applied to local subjects accusing county magistrates."

King Sejong believed that his subject's inability to accuse magistrates only contributed to the build up of won in the state and therefore weakened the credibility of his rule so long as his subjects held too much resentment. In 1433, King Sejong allowed subjects to raise complaints against the local magistrates, but also exempted magistrates from punishment to appease his advisors. While this did little to correct the underlying issues of the justice system, it still created some semblance of equality as ordinary citizens could file formal complaints against their leaders to relieve their won.

== Won and society ==
Joseon Korea had a very strict class system dictated by birth with few chance of upward mobility, but won allowed people of all social classes and genders to press charges against others.

In the year recorded as gyeongo, a female slave named Malgeum filed a formal complaint against Seungeun, her late husband's male relative. She claimed Seungeun forged a document and attempted to take her rightful lands inherited from her late husband. The magistrate investigated and found that Seungeun did indeed forge the document and ordered his arrest, as well as ordering the lands to be returned to Malgeum. Malgeum expressed an intense feeling of won, which the magistrate took into account when considering conducting the investigation. Malgeum was a female slave suing her male relative for land, and while she was still expected to abide by her societal and gender roles, she still used the justice system to relieve her feelings of won from the incident.

There were also instances in which people actively suppressed their won in petitions to prevent potential grievances from coming up in the future. In individual cases in which won conflicted with the existing law, the law prevailed and took precedence over any future won that could come up.

Most people submitted petitions to address and relieve their won from a dispute, but in 1652, an elite woman named Madam Im petitioned to obtain legal knowledge to prevent such a dispute from ever taking place. Madam Im and her husband, O Sinnam, did not have any sons and only two daughters from Sinnam's concubines. The couple decided to adopt Sinnam's grandnephew, O Sangji, before he was three years old and treated him as their heir. Upon Sinnam's death in 1632, however, Sangji's legitimacy was called into question due to the generational gap and Sinnam not yet officially recognizing his adopted son before his death. Sinnam's son-in-law, Yun Inchol claimed the property should be evenly distributed because Sangji was not officially the heir. Madam Im submitted a petition to the provincial governor concerning her son-in-law's share of the inheritance, and her husbands' daughters being born to concubine-slave mothers. In her petition, Madam Im addressed how Sinnam intended for Sangji to be his heir and how Sangji performed his duties as heir by arranging her husband's funeral and conducting ritual ancestor worship for twenty years. The governor responded to her petition by praising her efforts at preventing future discord by taking a legal route, instead of an emotional one, thus preventing any of Sinnam's other descendants from making a case through won.

== In international relations ==
The concept of won was also deployed in Joseon Korea's relations with Ming China. Responding to official Chinese accounts of the founding of Joseon which the Joseon government regarded as slanderous in the early 16th century, the Korean envoy in Beijing, Nam Gon, appealed to the emotional won they provoked in his homeland, and warned that they would tarnish the Ming themselves by association.
