= List of Arifureta characters =

This is a list of characters of the light novel series Arifureta.

== Main characters ==
Hajime Nagumo (南雲 ハジメ, Nagumo Hajime)
Voiced by: Toshinari Fukamachi (Japanese); Matt Shipman (English)
The main character; a high-school otaku student who is transported along with his classmates to another world, where he only gains a very low-level transmutation skill. During the first trek into the Orcus dungeon, Hajime uses his skill to protect his classmates after they are attacked, only to be betrayed by one of them and thrown straight into the abyss of the dungeon. Left for dead and after losing an arm to one of the monsters, he stumbles upon a very rare mineral that exudes a liquid with healing properties, which when drunk grants him the ability to survive by eating the flesh of monsters he kills, thereby altering his very DNA (causing his brown hair to turn white and possibly his brown eyes to red) while obtaining their abilities, allowing him to grow stronger at an accelerated rate. During his time in the Orcus Dungeon, Hajime also becomes a self-taught master gunsmith by applying his otaku knowledge based on science fiction and military technology, creating powerful alchemical weapons for him to use.
After rescuing Yue and conquering the dungeon (despite losing his right eye in battle), Hajime learns the secret of why the dungeons were created and is granted its treasures. Using the knowledge, tools and materials left in the lair of the labyrinth's creator, Hajime is able to create a new metal prosthetic left arm, replace his lost eye with a magic crystal (usually covered by a black eyepatch) and create tools, more powerful weaponry and even land/water/air vehicles for him (and later his party) to use. Leaving the dungeon, he then decides to conquer all 7 dungeons, to get all the ancient magics and use them to return to his home world. Hajime's experiences in the Abyss have caused him to become ruthless and cynical as he fights to survive and protect others, but he begins displaying glimpses of the lost kindness he once had while interacting with the rest of his party, some of his former classmates and even a humanoid-faced male fish named Lehman (who, according to Yue's thinking in the short story "I'll Never Forget That Warmth" in Volume 12 of the manga, may actually be Hajime's only close male friend). His job class is Synergist.
Yue (ユエ, Yue)
Voiced by: Yūki Kuwahara (Japanese); Tia Ballard (English)
A vampire princess with golden-blonde hair (with reddish-pink tips) and red eyes who was betrayed and imprisoned by her uncle and retainers in the bottom of the Labyrinth of Oscar Orcus for 300 years, until Hajime discovered and freed her using his transmutation skill. She is physically smaller than most people, but a magical prodigy that can use all elemental types of magic; she is also able to combine the Ancient Magics she receives from conquering the labyrinths beside Hajime into original and even more powerful spells. She also has automatic regeneration that keeps her from aging and heals her wounds very quickly. She became Hajime's first companion and fell in love with him as they journeyed together through the Orcus Labyrinth. Yue does not show any jealousy when other girls approach Hajime, but affirms herself as his first and official wife. In Season 3 of the anime, it is revealed that the reason she was betrayed was to protect her from becoming a vessel for the fallen God Ehit, due to her overwhelming power. Upon joining Hajime on his journey, her job class becomes Divine Priestess. In the manga volumes, a short story of the volume's events, told from Yue's point-of-view with her own thoughts and feelings, is usually included as an extra.
Shea Haulia (シア・ハウリア, Shia Hauria)
Voiced by: Minami Takahashi (Japanese); Amanda Lee (Lindsey Seidel [Season 1, Episode 8]), (Monica Rial [Season 3, Episode 7]) (English)
A rabbit-girl whom Hajime and Yue encounter, with light blue-white hair and pink bunny ears. She is different from the rest of her clan because of her ability to foresee the future, causing her to abandon the homeland together with her clan. She also possesses monstrous strength and uses one of Hajime's custom-made weapons, a giant war hammer called Drucken, in battle. She also develops feelings for Hajime after he helps her people and pursues him relentlessly, making Hajime originally find her annoying sometimes (although he does enjoy stroking her rabbit ears while she is sleeping); as time goes by, he comes to value her as someone deeply important to him, and in Season Three of the anime he and Shea finally achieve intimacy. Shea also develops a sister-like bond with Yue despite being her love rival for Hajime. Her job class is Diviner due to her future-foreseeing ability.
Tio Klarus (ティオ・クラルス, Tio Kurarusu)
Voiced by: Yoko Hikasa (Japanese); Morgan Garrett (English)
Tio is a pervert both physically and emotionally (courtesy of an unusual rear assault by Hajime after he and his group defeated her while she was under Shimizu's mind control), but she is honest and caring, and the way she speaks is more formal and similar to the old legends. Tio originally came from the dragon-born tribe, her parents sacrificing themselves fighting against the god centuries ago while hoping their daughter will one day find the person who can eventually defeat the god, and is the Princess of her clan. She is 563 years old and initially respected by Yue, who had been brought up to look to the Dragon-born as models of nobility (an image in Yue's mind that, thanks to Tio's behavior, ultimately shatters). Her human appearance is that of a woman in her 20s with "watermelon" chests, long flowing black hair and golden eyes. She devoted herself to Hajime after he freed her and calls Hajime "Master"; however, despite her "tendencies" at times driving him past the bounds of patience, Hajime has complete trust and faith in her. Her magic and defense are significantly high, especially in her Dragon form; even Hajime's party attacks only cracked her scales. Her dragon form is several meters long with golden slit-pupil eyes and black dragon scales, and in her dragon form she is far more powerful than the white dragons used by the demon forces (in the final battle against Ehit, she is the one who destroys both demon General Fried and his white dragon mount Uranos). Her job class is Guardian.
Kaori Shirasaki (白崎 香織, Shirasaki Kaori)
Voiced by: Saori Ōnishi (Japanese); Skyler McIntosh (English)
One of Hajime's classmates and the class idol, with black hair and brown eyes. Her job class is Healer. Back in Japan, she was the only one to actively speak to Hajime, going so far as to research manga, anime and even eroge to hold conversations with him. However, Kaori only realized her true feelings after Hajime fell into the abyss, and was the only one who did not believe in his death. After meeting him again, she was initially frightened by how ruthless Hajime had become, but eventually overcame her fear and confessed her love, joining him on his journey, usually competing with Yue and the others for his affection. She nearly dies after being run through from behind by Daisuke Hiyama, but thanks to the combined Spirit magic of Hajime, Yue, Tio and Aiko her soul is transferred into another, more powerful body that had previously belonged to one of God's (Ehit's) Apostles (in the anime, her new body develops her original body's brown eyes and she retains her original voice) while her original body is healed and placed in stasis for when (or if) she decides to return to it.
Shizuku Yaegashi (八重樫 雫, Yaegashi Shizuku)
Voiced by: Yumiri Hanamori (Japanese); Kate Bristol (English)
She is Kaori's best friend and a childhood friend of Kouki. She is a hardworking, kind and caring girl who passes her time practicing the kendo skills learned at her family's dojo (where Kouki Amanogawa is also a student). She is extremely sharp and is usually capable of processing things without much explanation. She is one of the more realistic among her classmates and acts as the voice of reason and caution instead of rushing in blindly like her classmates. She is referred to as a cool beauty, but has a secret girlish side that likes cute things, cats and stuffed dolls. After her Artifact sword (a sabre) was destroyed while battling Cattleya's monsters in the Great Orcus Labyrinth, she received one of Hajime's masterpieces, a black Kissaki Moroha Zukuri Shirasaya Katana made of the world's hardest mineral Azanthium (compressed to make it even stronger), as her new weapon, allowing her to utilize her samurai swordsmanship techniques to the fullest; in Volume 4 of the light novels, it is stated that because she had trained with the katana back in Japan she had had a hard time adapting to the Artifact sword given to her and feels more comfortable wielding her new katana. Her job class is Swordmaster, with (judging from glimpses of it in episodes of the anime's first season) her sword style appearing to be Iaido (Quick-Draw Style), but described in the light novels as being Yaegashi-ryū (八やえ重が樫し流りゅう, Yaegashi-style), a style of samurai martial arts developed by the Yaegashi Dojo. In the Sea of Trees Labyrinth, her feelings for Hajime started to grow and she herself became aware of it. In the fight of the last Labyrinth, in an attempt to finish her off, her opponent (a reversed clone of herself) taunted her with all her repressed inner feelings and the guilt of loving the person her best friend loves; however, Hajime saved her in time and encouraged her to win the fight. After the labyrinth was conquered, she confessed to him her love in front of them, saying that "[She] will do everything to make [him hers]" and began showing her cute and girlish sides to Hajime's party.

== Summoned class ==
Aiko Hatayama (畑山 愛子, Hatayama Aiko)
Voiced by: Ai Kakuma (Japanese); Emily Fajardo (English)
A school teacher (smaller in stature than her students, about the same size as Yue) with brown hair and large green eyes who was transported to the other world along with the rest of the class. She is extremely emotional and protective when it comes to her students, and tends sometimes to be a huge jumper-to-conclusions (especially when it comes to Hajime in his current state): in the extra short story ""Yue Does Not Approve!" in Volume 6 of the manga, she originally believes that because of Yue's child-like appearance she and Hajime are in danger of engaging in "an indecent relationship", but then calls Yue a "cougar" when Yue reveals that she is in fact older than Aiko, and finally her imagination goes totally off the rails when Yue informs her that she and Hajime are sexually intimate. Her job class is Farmer, and because of her amazing farming skills she becomes known as "the Goddess of Plenty" or "the Goddess of Fertility" (a title Hajime exploits both to encourage the people of the lakeside town of Ur and for his own purposes). When she encountered Hajime again in Ur and realized that he was still alive, she was shocked by the changes in his appearance and mood and was staggered by both his revelation of the world's true history and the truth about his disappearance, but began to have feelings for him after he saved her from poisoning (giving her an antidote via mouth-to-mouth). At first, she did not recognize her feelings, arguing that she and Hajime were simply teacher and student, but later events caused her to recognize her growing love for the young man (even while she kept denying it). She was very shocked when Hajime killed Yukitoshi Shimizu without a drop of regret, but later realized that Hajime did it to spare her from guilt; she is likewise devastated when she later realizes that combining her powers with Tio caused the destruction of the Divine Mountain cathedral and the deaths of everyone inside. Hajime has charged her with remaining his teacher (as well as to the rest of the class) and continually reminding him of what it is/means to be human.
Kouki Amanogawa (天之河 光輝, Amanogawa Kōki)
Voiced by: Tetsuya Kakihara (Japanese); Ricco Fajardo (English)
The summoned Hero, he sincerely believes in his own righteousness and tries to impose it on others, considering those opinions that do not coincide with his to be erroneous. These opinions/ideals are so strong that he is either unable or unwilling to kill enemies even when his own life is in danger, causing Captain Meld to apologize to him for not preparing the students to actually kill and Hajime to mock him for deluding himself. He was the only one who did not know about Kaori’s true feelings for Hajime. When Kouki saw how Hajime had changed, he began to despise him and consider him a villain, as he thought that Hajime had brainwashed Yue and the others into being with him. When Kaori confessed to Hajime that she loved him and wanted to go with him, Kouki began to jealously protest, arguing that he and Kaori were childhood friends and should always be together; in both the manga and light novels, he actually physically attacks Hajime, believing that by defeating Hajime hand-to-hand he will be able to free Kaori and the other girls from Hajime's supposed control (however, Hajime quickly disposes of him without laying a finger on him). Following the demons' invasion of the Heiligh Capital and the revelation of the truth about this world's gods, Kouki demanded to be allowed to join Hajime's party in conquering the remaining Labyrinths so that he could get stronger and prove his ideals are more effective that Hajime's pragmatism. However, his continued failures cause Kouki to spiral into further denial and depression, particularly after succumbing to two Labyrinths' temptations and learning of Shizuku's confession to Hajime, to the point where he actually falls under the influence of Eri Nakamura and betrays his own classmates while still believing that he is trying to save them from Hajime. Eventually, the efforts of his classmates break Kouki free from Eri's brainwashing, but rather than return to Japan he drops out of high school and chooses to remain in Tortus, abandoning the title of "Hero" and trying to redeem himself by traveling as an ordinary adventurer.
Ryutaro Sagami (坂上 龍太郎, Sagami Ryutaro)
Voiced by: Ryuichi Kijima (Japanese); Aaron Campbell (English)
One of Hajime's classmates and best friend of Kouki. Though at times rash and eager to rush into battle, he genuinely cares about his friends. He fights using his bare hands (enhanced by armored gauntlets; in the anime, they're spiked knuckledusters) and possesses superhuman strength. His job class is Monk.
Suzu Taniguchi (谷口鈴, Taniguchi Suzu)
Voiced by: Ayasa Itō (Japanese); Dani Chambers (English)
One of Hajime's classmates and part of the Hero's Party initially. Her job class is Barrier Master. In the anime, during the battle against Cattleya in the Great Orcus Labyrinth, she is hit with and partially disabled from the waist down by Petrification Magic, but is later healed by either Kaori's magic or Hajime's Holy Water. She is devastated by Eri's betrayal and the revelation that Eri only ever saw Suzu as a means of getting closer to Kouki and not a friend. Despite this, Suzu resolves to try and win Eri back again, and tags along with Hajime's party to conquer other Labyrinths to become strong enough to do so; however, she still has to learn that traveling with Hajime can be very hazardous to her health, as a joke about Hajime's eyepatch in Volume 7 of the light novels, Chapter 87 of the manga and Episode 1 of Season Three of the anime earns her a rubber bullet in her backside (he likewise threatens to squash her down five centimeters for laughing at some of the outlandish titles the Haulias have devised for him).
Yuka Sonobe (園部優花, Sonobe Yuka)
Voiced by: Miyu Tomita (Japanese); Mallorie Rodak (English)
One of Hajime's classmates, who chose to stop training with the Hero's Party in the Labyrinth following Hajime's supposed death. Feeling indebted after being saved by Hajime in the Labyrinth, she strives to not waste his sacrifice and instead aids Aiko's farming efforts in the Kingdom. She is relieved when Hajime later shows up alive, although she is shocked by how he has changed. Her classmates later start to tease her about becoming part of Hajime's "harem" despite her protests that she doesn't have feelings for him. Her job class is Acrobat, which makes her highly proficient with throwing knives.
Kousuke Endo (遠藤 浩介, Endo Kosuke)
Voiced by: Junya Enoki (Japanese); Justin Briner (English)
A classmate of Hajime's who was initially a part of the Hero's Party training in the Orcus Labyrinth. Due to having a "weak presence" (causing automatic doors in Japan to close on him 2/3 of the time), he is often accidentally overlooked and forgotten by his classmates, an unfortunate trait that has been enhanced since arriving on Tortus. After being sent off to find help by the rest of his friends during Cattleya's attack on the Hero's Party, Kousuke pleaded for Hajime's aid. Following Eri and Hiyama's betrayal, he is left more despondent due to feeling guilt that he could have saved Captain Meld, and so remains in the capital with most of the rest of the class. His job class is Assassin.
Atsushi Tamai (玉井淳史, Tamai Atsushi)
Voiced by: Makoto Kaneko (Japanese); Garrett Storms (English)
One of the students from Japan who got involved in the Summoning Incident and ended up in Tortus along with his other classmates. He is one of the group of students who aids Aiko's farming efforts in the Kingdom.
Nana Miyazaki (宮崎奈々, Miyazaki Nana)
Voiced by: Isa Kusunogi (Japanese); Macy Anne Johnson (English)
One of the students from Japan who got involved in the Summoning Incident and ended up in Tortus along with her other classmates. She is one of the group of students who aids Aiko's farming efforts in the Kingdom.
Taeko Sugawara (菅原妙子, Sugawara Taeko)
Voiced by: Mayu Horita (Japanese); Brittany Lauda (English)
one of the students from Japan who got involved in the Summoning Incident and ended up in Tortus along with her other classmates. She is one of the group of students who aids Aiko's farming efforts in the Kingdom.
Reiichi Kondou (近藤礼一, Kondo Reiichi)
One of the students from Japan who got involved in the Summoning Incident and ended up in Tortus along with his other classmates. According to the light novels, he was one of Hiyama's cronies and one of the boys who bullied Hajime back in Japan. When Eri Nakamura betrayed her classmates and participated in the demon invasion of the Heiligh Kingdom, she personally murdered him and then used her Necromancy skills to resurrect him as her undead puppet. On her orders, he attacked Hajime from behind, but his attack was blocked by Hajime's mana and he was killed again by a gunshot blast from Hajime. His job class was Grenadier.

== Antagonists ==
Daisuke Hiyama (檜山 大介, Hiyama Daisuke)
Voiced by: Minoru Shiraishi (Japanese); Orion Pitts (English)
A classmate of Hajime's who used to bully him due to jealousy over Kaori's closeness to him. Although he projects a boastful attitude, in reality he's quite cowardly and shrinks from any actual combat. During a boss fight inside the dungeon, he secretly attacked Hajime with fire magic, causing Hajime to fall into the abyss. Upon learning that Hajime was alive, in fear he tried to deny it. He has a maniacal desire to possess Kaori, which is why he made a deal with Eri Nakamura to turn Kaori into an undead puppet for his own enjoyment. During the invasion of the capital, Hiyama was beaten to near-death by Hajime and then finally killed and partially eaten by monsters after Hajime threw him to them.
Eri Nakamura (中村恵里, Nakamura Eri)
Voiced by: Asuka Nishi (Japanese); Megan Shipman (English)
A classmate of Hajime's. Though initially seeming to be a kind-hearted girl, she soon reveals her true nature during the demons' invasion as a deranged and manipulative psychopath obsessed with Kouki. After initially blackmailing Hiyama for his attempt on Hajime's life, she later started working with the demons and Noint, resurrecting the king, Captain Meld, several Heiligh nobles and soldiers as undead puppets under her control. Later, after revealing her true nature and betraying the rest of her classmates, resulting in the death of one classmate at her own hand, Eri retreats with Freid and begins creating an army of undead human/beastman hybrids and God's Apostles similar to Noint; in Episode 13 of the anime's 3rd season, she has undergone a transformation into a hybrid Apostle that has turned her black hair grey and given her black-feathered wings. She later assists Fried in kidnapping Myu and Remia and holding them hostage. In the final battle against Ehit (Volumes 11/12 of the light novels), she battles her former friend Suzu Taniguchi, but is defeated and chooses to commit suicide by activating a self-destruction spell. Her job class is Necromancer.
Yukitoshi Shimizu (清水幸利, Shimizu Yukitoshi)
Voiced by: Akira Ishida (Japanese); Derick Snow (English)
One of the summoned class who felt unappreciated and ended up accepting the demons' offer to help raise an army of monsters and lead them into battle to kill Aiko. After his army is defeated by Hajime's party and Hajime captures him, he rebuffs Aiko's reconciliation and attempts to take her as a hostage, but is fatally wounded by a demon attempting to assassinate Aiko. Despite both his and Aiko's pleading, Hajime chooses to kill Shimizu instead of saving him, though only to spare Aiko the guilt of feeling responsible for his death. His job class was Dark Mage.
Cattleya (カトレア, Katorea)
Voiced by: Hitomi Nabatame (Japanese); Amber Lee Connors (English)
A demon under Freid's command, assigned to conquer the Great Orcus Labyrinth and either recruit or kill the hero and his party using several enhanced monsters provided to her by Freid. In the end, she was killed by Hajime, prompting Mikhail, her lover, to try to avenge her.
Noint (ノイント, Nointo)
Voiced by: Rina Satō (Japanese); Katelyn Barr (English)
An humanoid apostle with feathered wings and blue eyes serving Ehit's will, usually to sow discord among the humans, demons and beastmen for her master's amusement. She kidnapped Aiko to keep her from revealing the truth about Ehit's goals to the summoned class, killed Captain Meld and fought against Hajime while the demons were attempting to invade the Heiligh capital. She was eventually killed by Hajime, and her body (which remained intact after Hajime had destroyed her Core) was used for the resurrection of Kaori, who had been killed by Daisuke; in the anime, once Kaori's soul is transferred into her body, her eyes change from blue to brown (Kaori's original eye color).
Freid Bagwa (フリード・バグアー, Furīdo Baguā)
Voiced by: Katsuyuki Konishi (Japanese); Brandon Potter (English)
The supreme commander of the demons' army. He has conquered two of the Great Labyrinths, firmly believe himself to be the Chosen Apostle of his God (in reality Ehit) and continues to follow him, determined to do his bidding and wage war against the humans. Freid is a recurrent opponent of Hajime and his party, but always fails to defeat them and in every encounter has been forced to retreat. He later kidnaps Myu, Remia and Hajime's classmates and tries to use them as hostages against Hajime. In the final battle, he and his dragon mount Uranos are destroyed by Tio.
Mikhail (ミハイル, Mihairu)
Voiced by: Makoto Ishii (Japanese); Chris Cason (English)
A demon under Fried's command and Cattleya's lover, who swears vengeance on Hajime and his party after learning of her death. He is killed in battle by Shea during the invasion of the Heiligh Kingdom.
Ehit (エヒト, Ehito)
The series' main antagonist, Ehit is known as a god, but was originally born as a man who attained immortality and became revered as a god instead. After ruling the world of Tortus for many years, Ehit decides to turn it into a "chessboard of life and death", pitting the races against each other into a state of perpetual war just for his amusement.

== Other characters ==
Myu (ミュウ, Myū)
Voiced by: Yui Ogura (Japanese); Lara Woodhull (English)
She is a young mer-folk (dagon) girl from Erisen, approximately four or five years old, who was kidnapped to be sold as a slave, but was saved by Hajime and his companions twice when they came across her in Fuhren. Initially, she refers to Hajime as "Onii-chan" (Big Brother), but later calls him "Papa" (Father) (much to his [and later Kaori's] chagrin) and refuses to call him anything else. Even though Hajime reluctantly becomes her father-figure, he becomes fiercely overprotective of her when someone makes her cry, thus revealing his parental feelings in front of his companions. She calls all of the other girls in Hajime's group "Onē-chan" (Big Sister); since she already has a mother, she won't call or think of any of them as "Mama" (even though Yue would desperately like her to). For all her young age, there are times when she shows a remarkably adult nature, and she is able to project a motherly aura that has reduced Yue to a near-infantile state. Her mother Remia has stated that thanks to her interactions with Hajime and the others, Myu has matured greatly (according to Remia, Myu used to be spoiled and dependent), and while she has been in some extremely dangerous situations, her courage and her trust in Hajime and the others remain unshaken (even if they do sometimes cover her eyes and ears so as to protect her from certain unpleasant sights), and Hajime has promised to take her with him when he eventually returns to Japan.
Liliana S. B. Heiligh (リリアーナ・S・B・ハイリヒ, Ririāna S. B. Hairihi)
Voiced by: Noriko Shibasaki (Japanese); Brianna Knickerbocker (English)
The princess of the Heiligh Kingdom who becomes friends with several members of the summoned class, including Kaori and Shizuku. After witnessing Noint kidnapping Aiko, Liliana set out to find Hajime's party to ask for their aid. Following Eri's murder of her father the King and the demons' attack, she became the ruler of the Heiligh Kingdom (in the light novels, she acts as Regent until her younger brother can be crowned the new King) and later resolves herself to being married into the family of another nation's rulers; however, after nearly being assaulted by her betrothed and rescued by Hajime, she started to develop feelings for him, even in spite of Hajime's typical lack of courtesy towards her.
Remia (レミア, Remia)
Voiced by: Sayaka Ohara (Japanese); Caitlin Glass (English)
Myu's mother, who is also a mer-folk/dagon-type demihuman from Erisen. She's a very attractive widow in her late 20's, and was injured by slavers when her daughter was kidnapped, but when Hajime's party returned Myu to Erisen, Kaori helped to heal Remia's injured leg. Since her husband, Myu's father, had passed away some years previously, she encourages Myu's attachment to Hajime and enjoys flirting with him (which, of course, excites the other girls' jealousy); however, Hajime understands that her attitude towards him is all to provide Myu with a more stable family life, and he has promised that when he takes Myu back to Japan with him, Remia will also accompany them. She apparently works with the local government on Erisen to liaise with the mainland and is extremely popular with the local populace, especially the male population.
Captain Meld Loggins (メルド・ロギンス船長, Merudo roginsu senchō)
Voiced by: Yasuhiro Mamiya (Japanese); Patrick Seitz (English)
The captain and leader of the knights of the Heiligh Kingdom (his actual title is "Knight-Commander"). When Hajime and his classmates are transported to Torchus to become heroes in the war against the demons, he is assigned as their instructor in both martial arts and magic. However, as time and their training progresses, he develops an emotional bond with his students and therefore refrains from teaching them probably the most important lesson - to actually kill people, an omission that nearly costs him and Kouki's party their lives in the battle against Cattleya and her magically-enhanced monsters in the Great Orcus Labyrinth. Because he is a man of honor, he feels guilt at not having saved Hajime when Hajime is thrown into the Abyss, but must obey the king and Pope Ishtar, who order him to never speak about Hajime's supposed death, and he freely expresses both delight at Hajime's survival and gratitude at Hajime's saving everyone's life. Later, while investigating the strange malaise that has affected most of the people at the castle, before he can contact Hajime he is attacked by his own men who are under Eri Nakamura's Necromantic spell and stabbed from behind by Daisuke Hiyama; he manages to escape, but is struck down and killed by Noint. Resurrected as an undead puppet by Eri, he first attacks and overcomes Kouki, then is made to attack Hajime. A portion of his original self emerges long enough to beg Hajime to set him free, which Hajime unhesitatingly does with a single shot, and Meld passes away with a smile. In Volume 6 of the light novels and Chapter 84 of the manga, Hajime leaves flowers for Meld at the Heiligh Monument for the Fallen.
Oscar Orcus (オスカー・オルクス)
Voiced by: Takuma Terashima (Japanese); Seth Magill (English)
One of the Liberators who opposed God, and the creator of the Great Orcus Labyrinth. An old recording of Oscar was seen by Hajime and Yue after they conquered his labyrinth and reached his lair, where he posthumously revealed the truth about Ehit and the Liberators. Like Hajime, Oscar was an extremely powerful Synergist, and because of their shared expertise in creating a number of artifacts Hajime considers Oscar to be a sort of mentor despite having never actually met him (however, they actually do meet and work together in the Season 2 OVA "The Miraculous Meeting and The Phantasmagorical Adventure", although Oscar will have no memory of the meeting when he is returned to his own time (only the feeling that he has gained "a difficult student"). Oscar is one of the protagonists of the prequel series Arifureta: From Commonplace to World's Strongest Zero.
Miledi Reisen (ミレディ・ライセン)
Voiced by: Yukana (Japanese); Sarah Wiedenheft (English)
One of the Liberators who opposed God long ago, who has survived to the present day by transferring her soul into golems she created. She is loud, boisterous and mischievous, with her practical jokes and overall personality completely irritating Hajime, Yue and Shea when they challenge her Labyrinth in Reisen Gorge. In the Season 2 OVA "The Miraculous Meeting and The Phantasmagorical Adventure", her past self comes face-to-face with Hajime, Yue and Shea, all of whom don't hesitate to make their feelings about her quite clear (much to the amusement of Oscar Orcus and fellow Liberators Meiru Melusine and Naiz Gruen, although all three do try to physically prevent Hajime, Yue and Shea from actually attacking Miledi); however, she and Yue are able to work together, and Yue comes to consider herself Miledi's heir and successor. Miledi is one of the protagonists of the prequel series Arifureta: From Commonplace to World's Strongest Zero.
