= Carter J. Eckert =

American historian (1945–2024)

- Born: 1945; Chicago, Illinois, U.S.
- Died: December 2024 (aged 78–79)
- Education: Lawrence University (B.A., M.A.); University of Washington (Ph.D.)
- Occupation: Historian
- Employer: Harvard University

Carter J. Eckert (1945 – December 2024) was an American historian who specialized in Korean history. He was the Yoon Se Young Professor of Korean History at Harvard University.

== Early life and education ==
Eckert was born in Chicago, Illinois, in 1945. He attended Lawrence University, where he studied Western ancient and medieval history. Eckert then undertook graduate studies, earning a Master of Arts in 1968.

After graduating from Harvard, Eckert worked as a Peace Corps Volunteer in Korea. He later returned to the U.S. to undertake doctoral study in Korean and Japanese history at the University of Washington.

== Career and death ==
Eckert joined Harvard in 1985. In 2004, he was named the first Seoul Broadcasting System Yoon Se Young Professor. The professorship was named for Korean businessman Yoon Se Young.

Eckert also served as an advisor to the United States Department of State on North Korean politics.

Eckert's death was announced in December 2024.

== Publications ==
In a statistical overview derived from writings by and about Carter J. Eckert, OCLC/WorldCat encompasses roughly eight works in 10+ publications in five languages and 1,000+ library holdings.

- Korea, old and new: a history (1990).
- Offspring of Empire: The Koch'ang Kims and the Colonial Origins of Korean Capitalism, 1876-1945 (1991); Nihon Teikoku no mōshigo: Kōshō no Kin ichizoku to Kankoku shihon shugi no shokuminchi kigen 1876-1945 (日本帝国の申し子: 高敞の金一族と韓国資本主義の植民地起源 1876-1945) (2004). Winner of the John K. Fairbank Prize.
- Hanʼguk kŭndaehwa, kijŏk ŭi kwajŏng (한국근대화) Modernization of the Republic of Korea: a Miraculous Achievement (2005).
- Park Chung Hee and Modern Korea: The Roots of Militarism, 1866–1945 (2016).

== Awards and honours ==
- American Historical Association, John K. Fairbank Prize
- Association for Asian Studies, John Whitney Hall Book Prize, 1994
- Fellow, Woodrow Wilson International Center for Scholars, 1996–1997
