= Kyungbang =

South Korean chemical and textile company

Kyungbang (Korean: 경방) is a Korean chemical and textile company established in 1919 and headquartered in Seoul, South Korea. Its current CEO and chairman is Joon Kim.

The company was founded by Kim Seong-su (1891–1955) on October 5, 1919, during the Japanese Imperial Period as Keibō (京紡). It was meant to assist in achieving national independence by helping create economic self-sufficiency for Korea. Kim established it under the name Keijo Textile Corporation (京城紡織株式會社). The company changed its registered business name to the current name on July 14, 1970.

== Sources ==
- Eckert, Carter J. (1991). Offspring of Empire: The Koch'ang Kims and the Colonial Origins of Korean Capitalism,1876-1945. ISBN 0-295-97533-4.

== See also ==
- Economy of South Korea
- Chemical
