= 圓 =

圓, 圆, 元, or 円 may refer to:

- Chinese Yuan, the Chinese currency base unit
  - Renminbi, the currency of People's Republic of China
  - New Taiwan dollar, the currency of Republic of China
- Japanese yen, the currency of Japan
  - Taiwan yen, the currency of Taiwan of Empire of Japan between 1895 and 1946
  - Korean yen, the currency of Korea of Empire of Japan between 1910 and 1945
  - B yen, the currency of US-occupied Okinawa between 1948 and 1958
- Various Korean currencies
  - South Korean won, the currency of South Korea
  - North Korean Won, the currency of North Korea
  - Korean Empire won, the currency of Korea between 1902 and 1910
  - South Korean won (1945), the currency of South Korea between 1945 and 1953
  - Won of the Red Army Command, the currency of the Soviet military command in North Korea between 1945 and 1947

== See also ==
- 元 (disambiguation)
