= Linyi (disambiguation) =

Linyi (临沂市) is a prefecture-level city of Shandong.

- Lanshan District, Linyi, formerly Linyi County (临沂县) and county-level city, now the urban center of Linyi

Linyi may also refer to:

- Linyi County, Dezhou (临邑县), Shandong
  - Linyi Town, Dezhou (临邑镇), town in and seat of Linyi County
- Linyi County, Shanxi (临猗县)
- Lâm Ấp or Linyi (林邑), an ancient kingdom in present-day central Vietnam.

== See also ==
- Lin Yi
