= Huguantun =

Huguantun 胡官屯镇
- Town
- Location in Shandong Huguantun (China)
- Coordinates: 36°33′31″N 116°34′55″E
- Country: People's Republic of China
- Province: Shandong
- Prefecture-level city: Dezhou
- County: Qihe County
- Time zone: UTC+8 (China Standard)

Huguantun (Chinese: 胡官屯镇) is a town in Qihe County, Dezhou, in northwestern Shandong province, China.
