= Biaobaisi =

Biaobaisi 表白寺镇
- Town
- Location in Shandong Biaobaisi (China)
- Coordinates: 36°52′38″N 116°55′26″E
- Country: People's Republic of China
- Province: Shandong
- Prefecture-level city: Dezhou
- County: Qihe County
- Time zone: UTC+8 (China Standard)

Biaobaisi (Chinese: 表白寺镇) is a town in Qihe County, Dezhou, in northwestern Shandong province, China.
