= Lun, Shandong =

Lun 伦镇
- Town
- Location in Shandong Lun (China)
- Coordinates: 36°47′00″N 116°33′53″E
- Country: People's Republic of China
- Province: Shandong
- Prefecture-level city: Dezhou
- County-level city: Yucheng
- Time zone: UTC+8 (China Standard)

Lun (Chinese: 伦镇) is a town in Yucheng, Dezhou, in northwestern Shandong province, China.
