= Zi, Shandong =

Zi 滋镇
- Town
- Location in Shandong Zi (China)
- Coordinates: 37°21′41″N 116°48′59″E
- Country: People's Republic of China
- Province: Shandong
- Prefecture-level city: Dezhou
- County: Ling County
- Time zone: UTC+8 (China Standard)

Zi (Chinese: 滋镇) is a town in Ling County, Dezhou, in northwestern Shandong province, China.
