= Liangjia =

Liangjia 梁家镇
- Town
- Location in Shandong Liangjia (China)
- Coordinates: 37°01′25″N 116°38′50″E
- Country: People's Republic of China
- Province: Shandong
- Prefecture-level city: Dezhou
- County-level city: Yucheng
- Time zone: UTC+8 (China Standard)

Liangjia (Chinese: 梁家镇) is a town in Yucheng, Dezhou, in northwestern Shandong province, China.
