= Lihewu =

Lihewu 理合务镇
- Town
- Location in Shandong Lihewu (China)
- Coordinates: 37°21′57″N 116°57′42″E
- Country: People's Republic of China
- Province: Shandong
- Prefecture-level city: Dezhou
- County: Linyi
- Time zone: UTC+8 (China Standard)

Lihewu (Chinese: 理合务镇) is a town in Linyi County, Dezhou, in northwestern Shandong province, China.
