= Decheng, Dezhou =

Decheng 德城区
- District
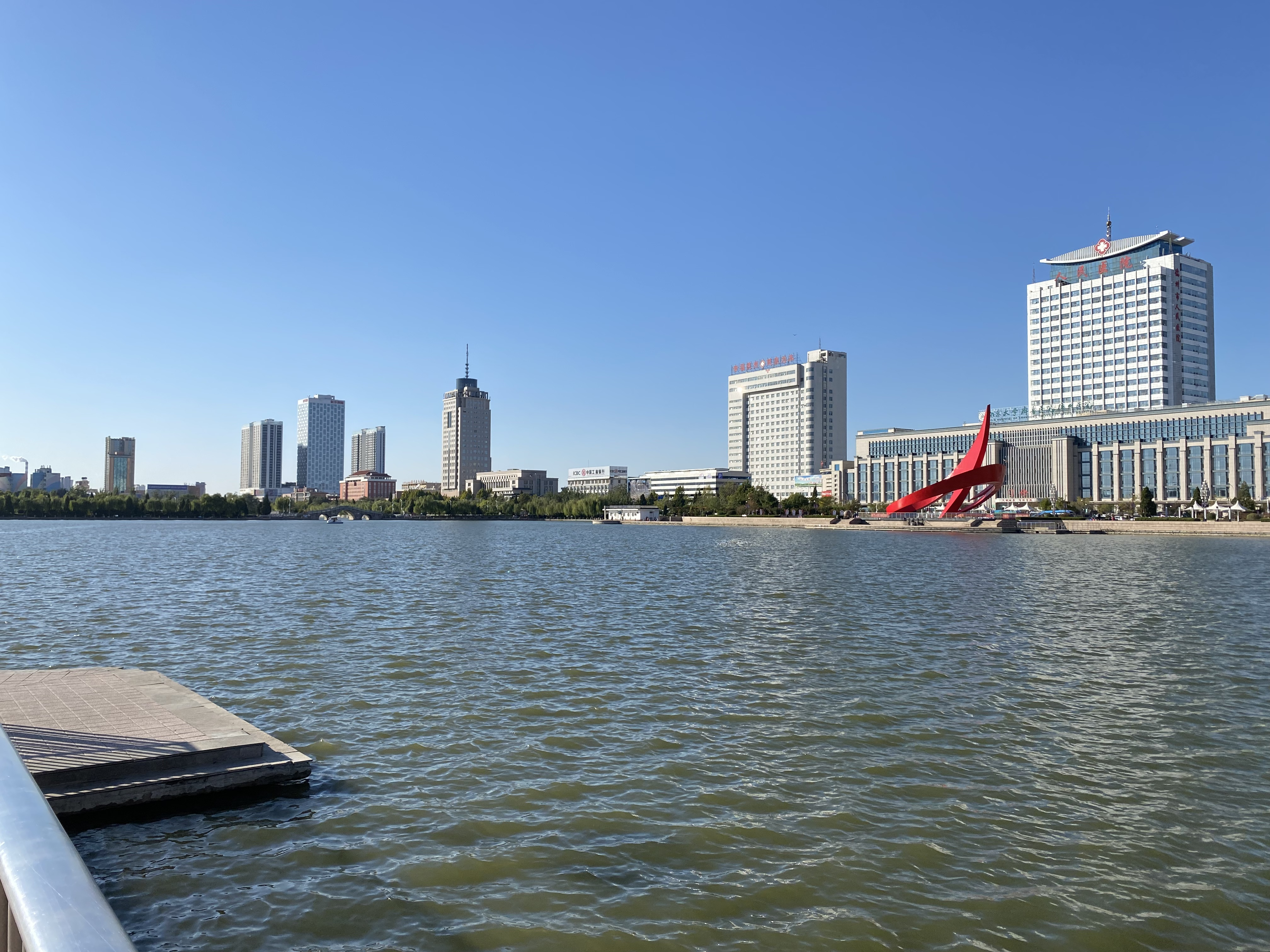
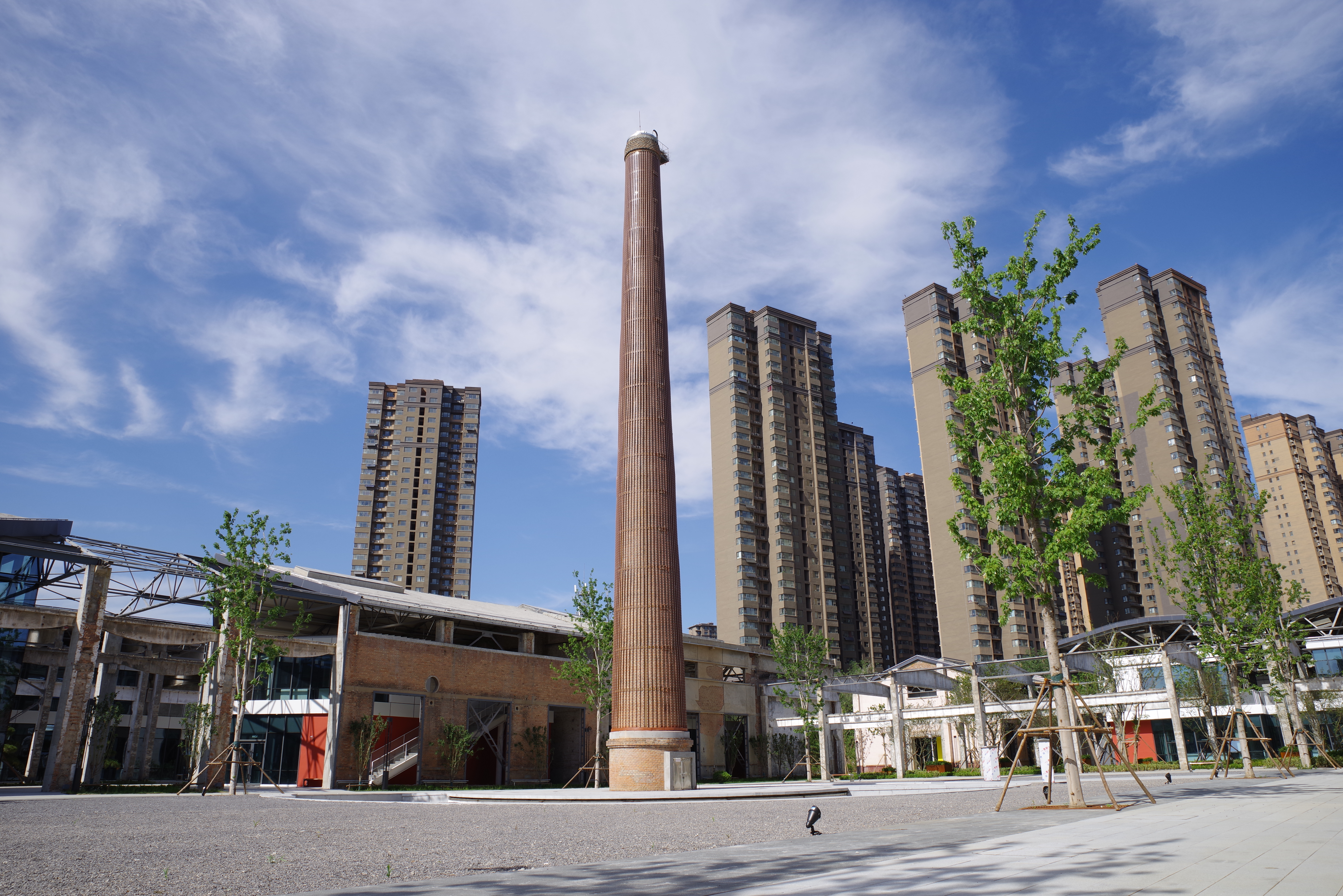
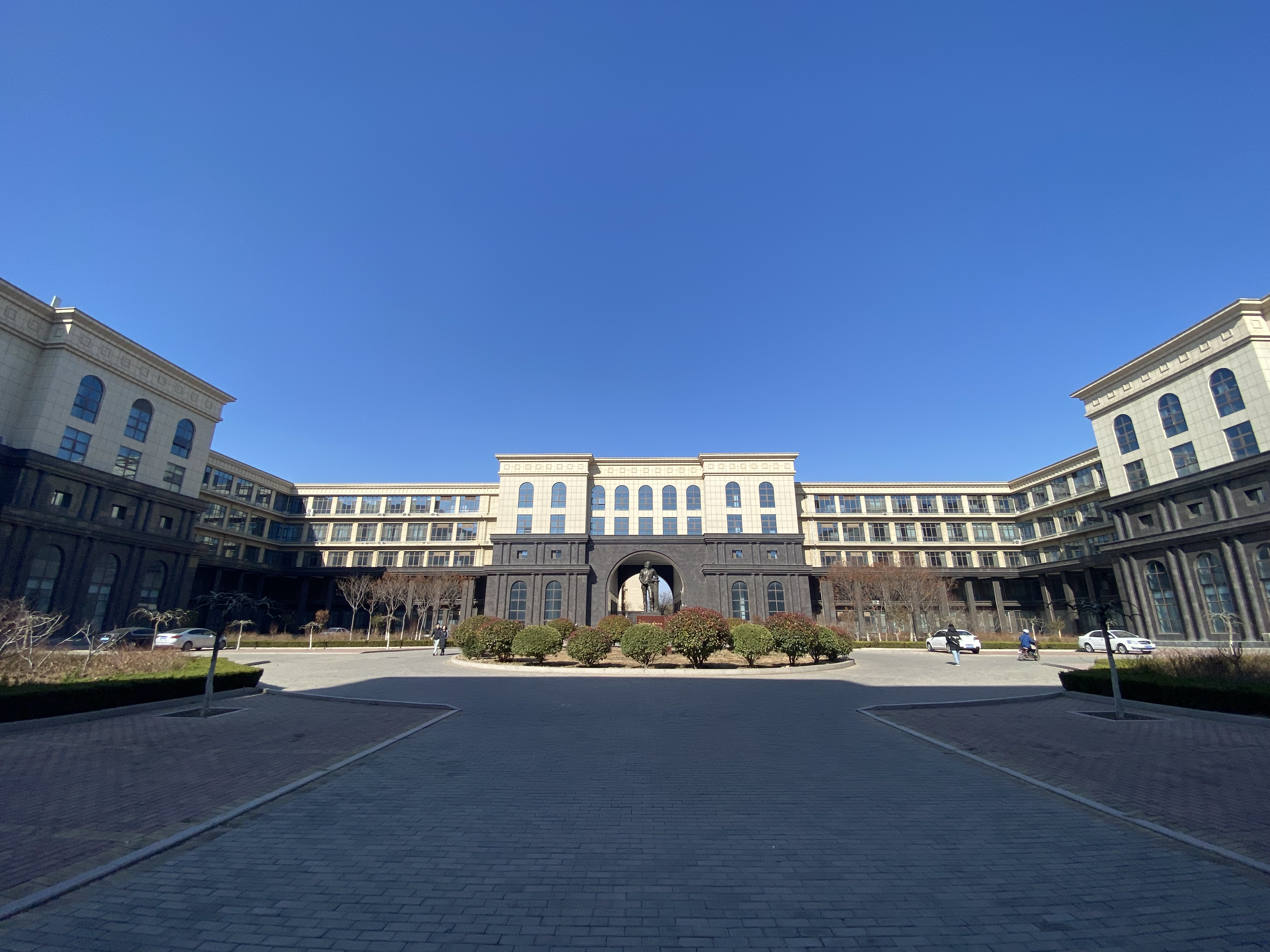
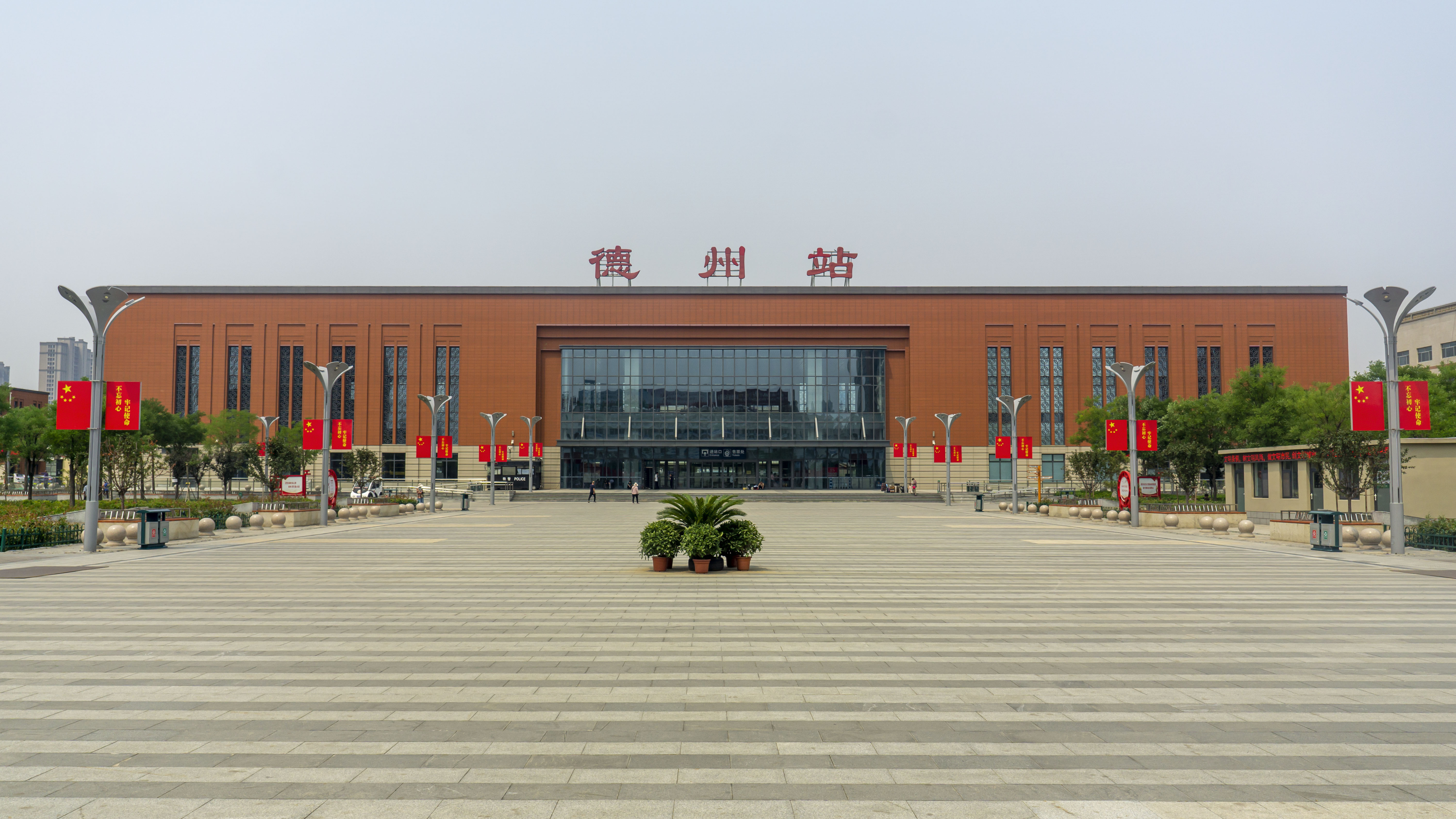
- Xinhu Park Degong Creation Park Dezhou College Dezhou Railway Station

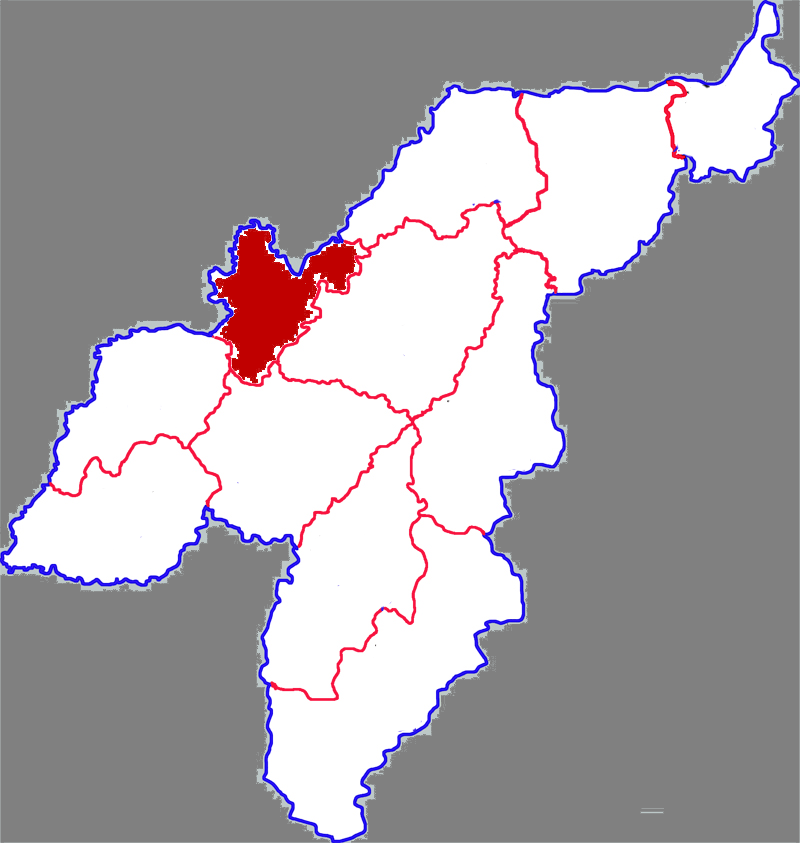
- Decheng in Dezhou

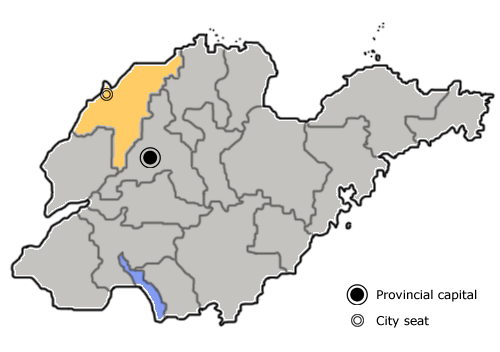
- Dezhou in Shandong
- Coordinates: 37°27′04″N 116°17′59″E
- Country: People's Republic of China
- Province: Shandong
- Prefecture-level city: Dezhou

Area
  - Total: 544 km^{2} (210 sq mi)

Population (2020)
  - Total: 1,005,084
  - Density: 1,850/km^{2} (4,790/sq mi)
- Time zone: UTC+8 (China Standard)
- Postal code: 253011

Decheng (Chinese: 德城; pinyin: Déchéng) is a district and the seat of the city of Dezhou, in the northwest of Shandong province, China, bordering Hebei province to the north.

It has an area of 539 km^{2} (208 sq mi) and around 1,005,000 inhabitants (2020).

As the seat of the municipal government of Dezhou City, Decheng District houses the main economic and cultural institutions and universities of Dezhou, like Dezhou University.

== Administrative divisions ==
As of 2012, this District is divided to 7 subdistricts, 3 towns and 2 townships.

Subdistricts

- Xinhu Subdistrict (新湖街道)
- Xinhua Subdistrict (新华街道)
- Tianqu Subdistrict (天衢街道)
- Dongdi Subdistrict (东地街道)
- Yunhe Subdistrict (运河街道)
- Songguantun Subdistrict (宋官屯街道)
- Changhe Subdistrict (长河街道)

Towns

- Ertun (二屯镇)
- Huangheya (黄河涯镇)
- Zhaohu (赵虎镇)

Townships

- Taitousi Township (抬头寺乡)
- Yuanqiao Township (袁桥乡)

== Industry ==
Decheng District in Dezhou City has a relatively prosperous solar energy industry, and in recent years, the semiconductor industry has developed rapidly.

== Education ==
Decheng District is home to several universities, including Dezhou University and Shandong Huayu University of Technology.
