= Zhengjiazhai =

Zhengjiazhai 郑家寨镇
- Town
- Location in Shandong Zhengjiazhai (China)
- Coordinates: 37°16′10″N 116°43′12″E
- Country: People's Republic of China
- Province: Shandong
- Prefecture-level city: Dezhou
- County: Ling County
- Time zone: UTC+8 (China Standard)

Zhengjiazhai (Chinese: 郑家寨镇) is a town in Ling County, Dezhou, in northwestern Shandong province, China.
