= Xinzhai, Dezhou =

Xinzhai 辛寨镇
- Town
- Location in Shandong Xinzhai (China)
- Coordinates: 36°48′34″N 116°25′23″E
- Country: People's Republic of China
- Province: Shandong
- Prefecture-level city: Dezhou
- County-level city: Yucheng
- Time zone: UTC+8 (China Standard)

Xinzhai (Chinese: 辛寨镇) is a town in Yucheng, Dezhou, in northwestern Shandong province, China.
