= Bianlin =

Bianlin 边临镇
- Town
- Location in Shandong Bianlin (China)
- Coordinates: 37°26′08″N 116°33′00″E
- Country: People's Republic of China
- Province: Shandong
- Prefecture-level city: Dezhou
- County: Ling County
- Time zone: UTC+8 (China Standard)

Bianlin (Chinese: 边临镇) is a town in Ling County, Dezhou, in northwestern Shandong province, China.
