= Deping =

Town in Shandong, China

Deping 德平镇
- Town
- Location in Shandong Deping (China)
- Coordinates: 37°27′54″N 116°57′22″E
- Country: People's Republic of China
- Province: Shandong
- Prefecture-level city: Dezhou
- County: Linyi
- Time zone: UTC+8 (China Standard)

Deping (Chinese: 德平镇) is a town in Linyi County, Dezhou, in northwestern Shandong province, China.
