= Zhu'e =

Zhu'e 祝阿镇
- Town
- Location in Shandong Zhu'e (China)
- Coordinates: 36°44′22″N 116°45′51″E
- Country: People's Republic of China
- Province: Shandong
- Prefecture-level city: Dezhou
- County: Qihe County
- Time zone: UTC+8 (China Standard)

Zhu'e (Chinese: 祝阿镇) is a town in Qihe County, Dezhou, in northwestern Shandong province, China. The population consists of 29 149 women and 28 846 men. Children under 15 make up 15.0 %, adults 15-64 75 %, and the elderly over 65 9.0 %. Average annual precipitation is 818 millimeters. The rainiest month is July, with an average of 297 mm of precipitation, and the driest is January, with 5 mm of precipitation.
