= Fangsi =

Fangsi 房寺镇
- Town
- Location in Shandong Fangsi (China)
- Coordinates: 36°55′55″N 116°28′34″E
- Country: People's Republic of China
- Province: Shandong
- Prefecture-level city: Dezhou
- County-level city: Yucheng
- Time zone: UTC+8 (China Standard)

Fangsi (Chinese: 房寺镇) is a town in Yucheng, Dezhou, in northwestern Shandong province, China.
