= Cuijia =

Cuijia 翟家镇
- Town
- Location in Shandong Cuijia (China)
- Coordinates: 37°23′15″N 116°54′26″E
- Country: People's Republic of China
- Province: Shandong
- Prefecture-level city: Dezhou
- County: Linyi
- Time zone: UTC+8 (China Standard)

Cuijia (Chinese: 翟家镇) is a town in Linyi County, Dezhou, in northwestern Shandong province, China.
