= Songjia, Shandong =

Songjia 宋家镇
- Town
- Location in Shandong Songjia (China)
- Coordinates: 37°31′50″N 116°51′06″E
- Country: People's Republic of China
- Province: Shandong
- Prefecture-level city: Dezhou
- County: Ling County
- Time zone: UTC+8 (China Standard)

Songjia (Chinese: 宋家镇) is a town in Ling County, Dezhou, in northwestern Shandong province, China.
