= Jiaomiao =

Jiaomiao 焦庙镇
- Town
- Location in Shandong Jiaomiao (China)
- Coordinates: 36°39′18″N 116°38′51″E
- Country: People's Republic of China
- Province: Shandong
- Prefecture-level city: Dezhou
- County: Qihe County
- Time zone: UTC+8 (China Standard)

Jiaomiao (Chinese: 焦庙镇) is a town in Qihe County, Dezhou, in northwestern Shandong province, China.
