= Zhangzhuang, Dezhou =

Zhangzhuang 张庄镇
- Town
- Location in Shandong Zhangzhuang (China)
- Coordinates: 37°02′20″N 116°33′32″E
- Country: People's Republic of China
- Province: Shandong
- Prefecture-level city: Dezhou
- County-level city: Yucheng
- Time zone: UTC+8 (China Standard)

Zhangzhuang (Chinese: 张庄镇) is a town in Yucheng, Dezhou, in northwestern Shandong province, China.
