= Zhanghua, Shandong =

Zhanghua 张华镇
- Town
- Location in Shandong Zhanghua (China)
- Coordinates: 37°01′41″N 116°19′19″E
- Country: People's Republic of China
- Province: Shandong
- Prefecture-level city: Dezhou
- County: Pingyuan County
- Time zone: UTC+8 (China Standard)

Zhanghua (Chinese: 张华镇) is a town in Pingyuan County, Dezhou, in northwestern Shandong province, China.
