= Linyi Town, Dezhou =

Town in Shandong, China

Linyi 临邑镇
- Town
- Location in Shandong
- Coordinates: 37°11′10″N 116°52′28″E
- Country: People's Republic of China
- Province: Shandong
- Prefecture-level city: Dezhou
- County: Linyi
- Time zone: UTC+8 (China Standard)

Linyi (Chinese: 临邑镇) is a town in Linyi County, Dezhou, in northwestern Shandong province, China.
