= Renliji =

Renliji 仁里集镇
- Town
- Location in Shandong Renliji (China)
- Coordinates: 36°32′39″N 116°28′30″E
- Country: People's Republic of China
- Province: Shandong
- Prefecture-level city: Dezhou
- County: Qihe County
- Time zone: UTC+8 (China Standard)

Renliji (Chinese: 仁里集镇) is a town in Qihe County, Dezhou, in northwestern Shandong province, China.
