= Xinglong, Dezhou =

Xinglong 兴隆镇
- Town
- Location in Shandong Xinglong (China)
- Coordinates: 37°04′35″N 116°45′44″E
- Country: People's Republic of China
- Province: Shandong
- Prefecture-level city: Dezhou
- County: Linyi
- Time zone: UTC+8 (China Standard)

Xinglong (Chinese: 兴隆镇) is a town in Linyi County, Dezhou, in northwestern Shandong province, China.
