= Qiancao =

Qiancao 前曹镇
- Town
- Location in Shandong Qiancao (China)
- Coordinates: 37°07′52″N 116°31′06″E
- Country: People's Republic of China
- Province: Shandong
- Prefecture-level city: Dezhou
- County: Pingyuan County
- Time zone: UTC+8 (China Standard)

Qiancao (Chinese: 前曹镇) is a town in Pingyuan County, Dezhou, in northwestern Shandong province, China.
