= Mi, Shandong =

Mi 糜镇
- Town
- Location in Shandong Mi (China)
- Coordinates: 37°26′02″N 116°50′45″E
- Country: People's Republic of China
- Province: Shandong
- Prefecture-level city: Dezhou
- County: Ling County
- Time zone: UTC+8 (China Standard)

Mi (Chinese: 糜镇) is a town in Ling County, Dezhou, in northwestern Shandong province, China.
