= Ertun =

Ertun 二屯镇
- Town
- Location in Shandong Ertun (China)
- Coordinates: 37°31′56″N 116°19′27″E
- Country: People's Republic of China
- Province: Shandong
- Prefecture-level city: Dezhou
- District: Decheng District
- Time zone: UTC+8 (China Standard)

Ertun (Chinese: 二屯镇) is a town in Decheng District, Dezhou, in northwestern Shandong province, China.
