= Huangheya =

Huangheya 黄河涯镇
- Town
- Location within China Location within Shandong
- Coordinates: 37°20′58″N 116°19′58″E
- Country: People's Republic of China
- Province: Shandong
- Prefecture-level city: Dezhou
- District: Decheng District
- Time zone: UTC+8 (China Standard)

Huangheya (Chinese: 黄河涯; pinyin: Huánghéyá) is a town in Decheng District, Dezhou, in northwestern Shandong province, China. As of 2020, it administers the following 29 villages:

- Huangheya Village
- Lüyuan Village (绿苑村)
- Xinjizhuang Village (新纪庄村)
- Gengliyang Village (耿李杨村)
- Zhabei Village (闸北村)
- Wangchengzhai Village (王程寨村)
- Qianhouli Village (前后李村)
- Dashi Village (大史村)
- Dongxitun Village (东西屯村)
- Xinqiu Village (馨秋村)
- Taoyuan Village (桃园村)
- Dayuzhuang Village (大于庄村)
- Wangcundian Village (王村店村)
- Xinyuan Village (鑫源村)
- Lijiaqiao Village (李家桥村)
- Sanshilipu Village (三十里铺村)
- Jiahe Village (嘉和村)
- Lezhang Village (乐章村)
- Nianlipu Village (廿里铺村)
- Sixin Village (四新村)
- Zhangweixin Village (漳卫新村)
- Lijiamiao Village (李家庙村)
- Shayang Village (沙杨村)
- Jiu Village (九村)
- Jiaozhuang Village (焦庄村)
- Wanglü Village (王律村)
- Songqitun Village (宋奇屯村)
- Xuzhuang Village (许庄村)
- Tengzhuang Village (滕庄村)
