= Jiaozhan =

Jiaozhan 腰站镇
- Town
- Location in Shandong Jiaozhan (China)
- Coordinates: 37°01′47″N 116°14′55″E
- Country: People's Republic of China
- Province: Shandong
- Prefecture-level city: Dezhou
- County: Pingyuan County
- Time zone: UTC+8 (China Standard)

Jiaozhan (Chinese: 腰站镇) is a town in Pingyuan County, Dezhou, in northwestern Shandong province, China.
