= Qiansun =

Qiansun 前孙镇
- Town
- Location in Shandong Qiansun (China)
- Coordinates: 37°31′02″N 116°42′27″E
- Country: People's Republic of China
- Province: Shandong
- Prefecture-level city: Dezhou
- County: Ling County
- Time zone: UTC+8 (China Standard)

Qiansun (Chinese: 前孙镇) is a town in Ling County, Dezhou, in northwestern Shandong province, China.
