= Shentou, Shandong =

Shentou 神头镇
- Town
- Location in Shandong Shentou (China)
- Coordinates: 37°21′54″N 116°41′30″E
- Country: People's Republic of China
- Province: Shandong
- Prefecture-level city: Dezhou
- County: Ling County
- Time zone: UTC+8 (China Standard)

Shentou (Chinese: 神头镇) is a town in Ling County, Dezhou, in northwestern Shandong province, China.
