= Pandian, Shandong =

Pandian 潘店镇
- Town
- Location in Shandong Pandian (China)
- Coordinates: 36°37′50″N 116°27′16″E
- Country: People's Republic of China
- Province: Shandong
- Prefecture-level city: Dezhou
- County: Qihe County
- Time zone: UTC+8 (China Standard)

Pandian (Chinese: 潘店镇) is a town in Qihe County, Dezhou, in northwestern Shandong province, China.
