= Zhaoguan, Shandong =

Zhaoguan 赵官镇
- Town
- Location in Shandong Zhaoguan (China)
- Coordinates: 36°30′25″N 116°32′53″E
- Country: People's Republic of China
- Province: Shandong
- Prefecture-level city: Dezhou
- County: Qihe County
- Time zone: UTC+8 (China Standard)

Zhaoguan (Chinese: 赵官镇) is a town in Qihe County, Dezhou, in northwestern Shandong province, China.
