= Yidukou =

Yidukou 义渡口镇
- Town
- Location in Shandong Yidukou (China)
- Coordinates: 37°28′30″N 116°44′38″E
- Country: People's Republic of China
- Province: Shandong
- Prefecture-level city: Dezhou
- County: Ling County
- Time zone: UTC+8 (China Standard)

Yidukou (Chinese: 义渡口镇) is a town in Ling County, Dezhou, in northwestern Shandong province, China.
