= Zhaohu =

Zhaohu 赵虎镇
- Town
- Location in Shandong Zhaohu (China)
- Coordinates: 37°30′42″N 116°29′32″E
- Country: People's Republic of China
- Province: Shandong
- Prefecture-level city: Dezhou
- District: Decheng District
- Time zone: UTC+8 (China Standard)

Zhaohu (Chinese: 赵虎镇) is a town in Decheng District, Dezhou, in northwestern Shandong province, China.
