= Xindian, Dezhou =

Xindian 辛店镇
- Town
- Location in Shandong Xindian (China)
- Coordinates: 37°06′16″N 116°41′00″E
- Country: People's Republic of China
- Province: Shandong
- Prefecture-level city: Dezhou
- County-level city: Yucheng
- Time zone: UTC+8 (China Standard)

Xindian (Chinese: 辛店镇) is a town in Yucheng, Dezhou, in northwestern Shandong province, China.
