= Dingzhuang, Ling County =

Dingzhuang 丁庄镇
- Town
- Location in Shandong Dingzhuang (China)
- Coordinates: 37°19′17″N 116°27′01″E
- Country: People's Republic of China
- Province: Shandong
- Prefecture-level city: Dezhou
- County: Ling County
- Time zone: UTC+8 (China Standard)

Dingzhuang (Chinese: 丁庄镇) is a town in Ling County, Dezhou, in northwestern Shandong province, China.
