= Mengsi =

Mengsi 孟寺镇
- Town
- Location in Shandong Mengsi (China)
- Coordinates: 37°12′16″N 117°00′03″E
- Country: People's Republic of China
- Province: Shandong
- Prefecture-level city: Dezhou
- County: Linyi
- Time zone: UTC+8 (China Standard)

Mengsi (Chinese: 孟寺镇) is a town in Linyi County, Dezhou, in northwestern Shandong province, China.
