= Wanggaopu =

Wanggaopu 王杲铺镇
- Town
- Location in Shandong Wanggaopu (China)
- Coordinates: 37°13′51″N 116°16′57″E
- Country: People's Republic of China
- Province: Shandong
- Prefecture-level city: Dezhou
- County: Pingyuan County
- Time zone: UTC+8 (China Standard)

Wanggaopu (Chinese: 王杲铺镇) is a town in Pingyuan County, Dezhou, in northwestern Shandong province, China.
