= Xuanzhangtun =

Town in Shandong, China

Xuanzhangtun 宣章屯镇
- Town
- Location in Shandong Xuanzhangtun (China)
- Coordinates: 36°56′05″N 116°48′17″E
- Country: People's Republic of China
- Province: Shandong
- Prefecture-level city: Dezhou
- County: Qihe County
- Time zone: UTC+8 (China Standard)

Xuanzhangtun (Chinese: 宣章屯镇) is a town in Qihe County, Dezhou, in northwestern Shandong province, China.
