= Wangmiao, Dezhou =

Wangmiao 王庙镇
- Town
- Location in Shandong Wangmiao (China)
- Coordinates: 37°02′13″N 116°23′59″E
- Country: People's Republic of China
- Province: Shandong
- Prefecture-level city: Dezhou
- County: Pingyuan County
- Time zone: UTC+8 (China Standard)

Wangmiao (Chinese: 王庙镇) is a town in Pingyuan County, Dezhou, in northwestern Shandong province, China.
