= Linzi, Dezhou =

Linzi 林子镇
- Town
- Location in Shandong Linzi (China)
- Coordinates: 37°18′14″N 116°52′37″E
- Country: People's Republic of China
- Province: Shandong
- Prefecture-level city: Dezhou
- County: Linyi
- Time zone: UTC+8 (China Standard)

Linzi (Chinese: 林子镇) is a town in Linyi County, Dezhou, in northwestern Shandong province, China.
