= Encheng =

Encheng 恩城镇
- Town
- Location in Shandong Encheng (China)
- Coordinates: 37°09′17″N 116°16′16″E
- Country: People's Republic of China
- Province: Shandong
- Prefecture-level city: Dezhou
- County: Pingyuan County
- Time zone: UTC+8 (China Standard)

Encheng (Chinese: 恩城镇) is a town in Pingyuan County, Dezhou, in northwestern Shandong province, China.
