= Anren (disambiguation) =

Anren may refer to any of the following places in China:

- Anren County, Chenzhou, Hunan province
- Anren, Shandong a town of Yucheng, Dezhou, Shandong
- Anren, Dayi, a town of Dayi County, Chengdu, Sichuan, see Jianchuan Museum Cluster
