= Weiwangzhuang =

Weiwangzhuang 徽王庄镇
- Town
- Location in Shandong Weiwangzhuang (China)
- Coordinates: 37°28′21″N 116°35′54″E
- Country: People's Republic of China
- Province: Shandong
- Prefecture-level city: Dezhou
- County: Ling County
- Time zone: UTC+8 (China Standard)

Weiwangzhuang (Chinese: 徽王庄镇) is a town in Ling County, Dezhou, in northwestern Shandong province, China.
