= Qihe County =

Qihe County 齐河县 Tsiho
- County
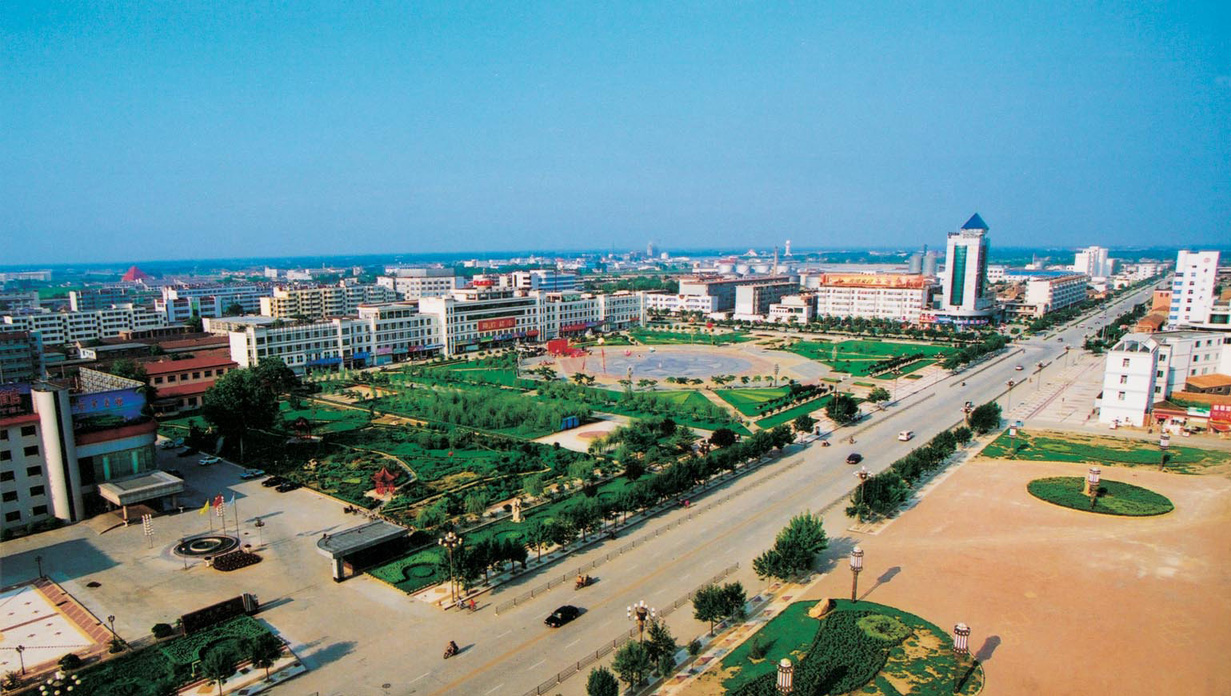
- Qihe skyline

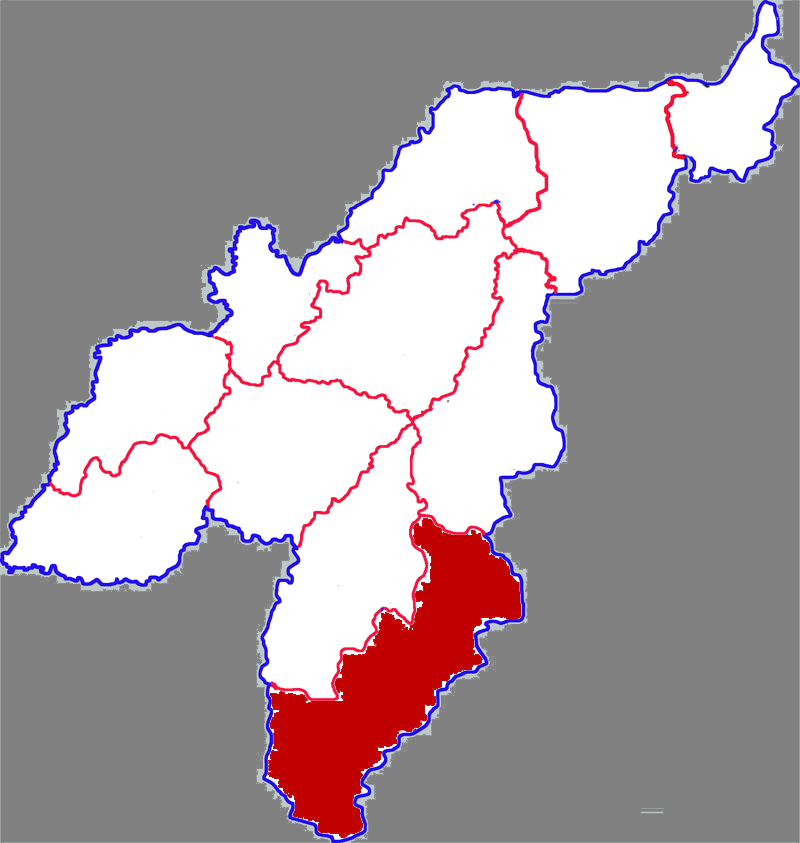
- Qihe in Dezhou

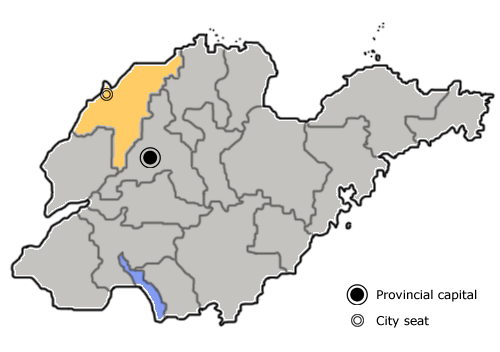
- Dezhou in Shandong
- Coordinates: 36°46′59″N 116°45′47″E
- Country: People's Republic of China
- Province: Shandong
- Prefecture-level city: Dezhou

Area
  - Total: 1,411 km^{2} (545 sq mi)

Population (2019)
  - Total: 622,000
  - Density: 441/km^{2} (1,140/sq mi)
- Time zone: UTC+8 (China Standard)
- Postal code: 251100

Qihe County (simplified Chinese: 齐河县; traditional Chinese: 齊河縣; pinyin: Qíhé Xiàn) is a county in the northwest of Shandong province, People's Republic of China. It is the southernmost county-level division of the prefecture-level city of Dezhou.

Qihe County is subordinate to Dezhou City, located in the northwestern plain of Lu, on the north bank of the Yellow River, facing Jinan across the river. The county governs 2 townships, 11 towns and 2 sub-district offices with a total population of 780,000 and a total area of 1,411 square kilometers. It belongs to the alluvial plain of the lower Yellow River. It has fertile soil, suitable climate and sufficient sunshine.

Qihe is an eco-tourism demonstration city in China. It is China's only energy automobile manufacturing city and China's emerging industrial equipment manufacturing city. Qihe County is one of the top 100 counties in the economically underdeveloped areas of Shandong Province.

== Administrative divisions ==
As of 2012, this county is divided to 9 towns and 5 townships.

Towns

- Yancheng (晏城镇)
- Biaobaisi (表白寺镇)
- Jiaomiao (焦庙镇)
- Zhaoguan (赵官镇)
- Zhu'e (祝阿镇)
- Renliji (仁里集镇)
- Pandian (潘店镇)
- Huguantun (胡官屯镇)
- Xuanzhangtun (宣章屯镇)

Townships

- Huadian Township (华店乡)
- Antou Township (安头乡)
- Maji Township (马集乡)
- Liuqiao Township (刘桥乡)
- Dahuang Township (大黄乡)

== Climate ==
Climate data for Qihe, elevation 23 m (75 ft), (1991–2020 normals, extremes 1981–2010)
Month	Jan	Feb	Mar	Apr	May	Jun	Jul	Aug	Sep	Oct	Nov	Dec	Year
Record high °C (°F)	17.9 (64.2)	20.7 (69.3)	28.7 (83.7)	32.7 (90.9)	38.1 (100.6)	40.8 (105.4)	41.8 (107.2)	36.0 (96.8)	36.1 (97.0)	31.4 (88.5)	25.8 (78.4)	18.5 (65.3)	41.8 (107.2)
Mean daily maximum °C (°F)	4.0 (39.2)	8.0 (46.4)	15.0 (59.0)	21.3 (70.3)	27.1 (80.8)	31.8 (89.2)	32.1 (89.8)	30.6 (87.1)	27.2 (81.0)	21.3 (70.3)	12.9 (55.2)	5.6 (42.1)	19.7 (67.5)
Daily mean °C (°F)	−1.5 (29.3)	2.0 (35.6)	8.7 (47.7)	15.0 (59.0)	21.0 (69.8)	25.7 (78.3)	27.2 (81.0)	25.8 (78.4)	21.1 (70.0)	14.8 (58.6)	7.1 (44.8)	0.3 (32.5)	13.9 (57.1)
Mean daily minimum °C (°F)	−5.7 (21.7)	−2.7 (27.1)	3.2 (37.8)	9.2 (48.6)	15.2 (59.4)	20.1 (68.2)	23.1 (73.6)	21.9 (71.4)	16.3 (61.3)	9.8 (49.6)	2.5 (36.5)	−3.9 (25.0)	9.1 (48.3)
Record low °C (°F)	−19.6 (−3.3)	−14.6 (5.7)	−8.96 (15.87)	−0.3 (31.5)	5.2 (41.4)	11.3 (52.3)	17.6 (63.7)	13.3 (55.9)	6.8 (44.2)	−2.4 (27.7)	−10.6 (12.9)	−18.1 (−0.6)	−19.6 (−3.3)
Average precipitation mm (inches)	5.2 (0.20)	9.1 (0.36)	8.9 (0.35)	39.7 (1.56)	48.8 (1.92)	90.4 (3.56)	163.8 (6.45)	160.4 (6.31)	47.9 (1.89)	28.2 (1.11)	19.8 (0.78)	4.4 (0.17)	626.6 (24.66)
Average precipitation days (≥ 0.1 mm)	2.0	3.1	2.8	5.5	6.1	7.8	10.7	10.2	6.6	5.2	3.9	2.1	66
Average snowy days	3.1	3.2	1.0	0.1	0	0	0	0	0	0	0.8	2.0	10.2
Average relative humidity (%)	61	59	53	60	63	63	78	82	77	70	68	64	67
Mean monthly sunshine hours	146.1	147.0	205.8	217.9	242.4	210.4	179.4	182.4	174.6	172.9	149.8	148.9	2,177.6
Percentage possible sunshine	47	48	55	55	55	48	40	44	47	50	50	50	49
Source: China Meteorological Administration
