= Lingcheng, Dezhou =

Lingcheng 陵城区
- District
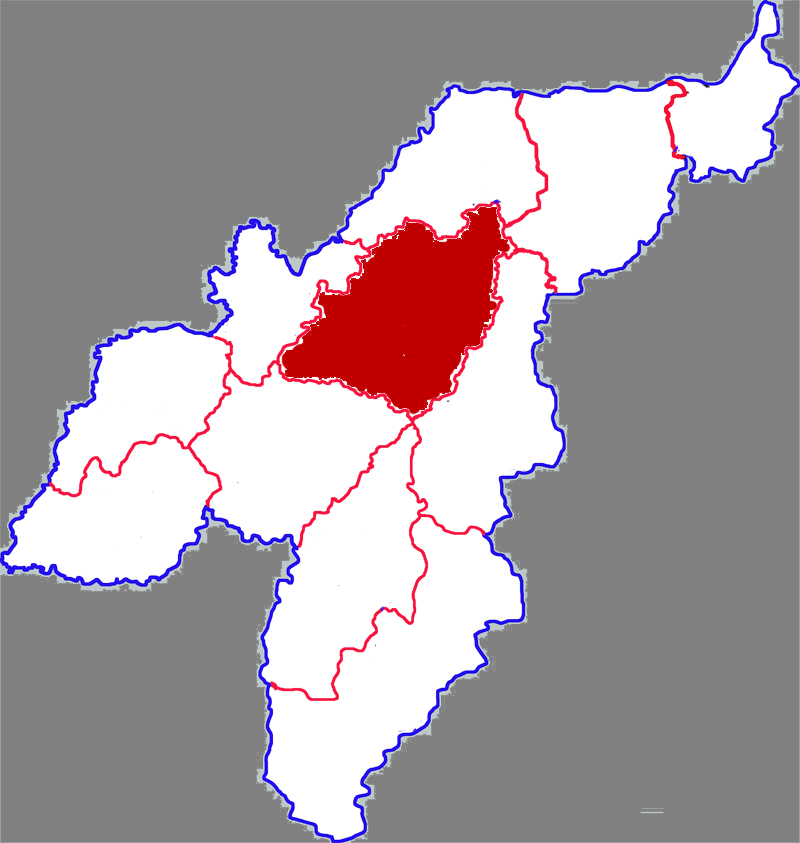
- Lingcheng in Dezhou

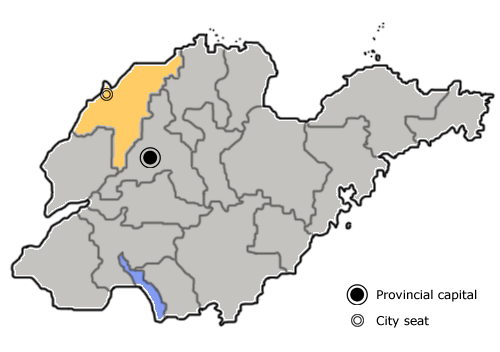
- Dezhou in Shandong
- Coordinates: 37°20′10″N 116°34′34″E
- Country: People's Republic of China
- Province: Shandong
- Prefecture-level city: Dezhou

Area
  - Total: 1,213 km^{2} (468 sq mi)

Population (2019)
  - Total: 451,000
  - Density: 372/km^{2} (963/sq mi)
- Time zone: UTC+8 (China Standard)

Lingcheng, Dezhou
- Simplified Chinese: 陵城区
- Traditional Chinese: 陵城區
Transcriptions
Standard Mandarin
- Hanyu Pinyin: Língchéng Qū

Ling County
- Simplified Chinese: 陵县
- Traditional Chinese: 陵縣
Transcriptions
Standard Mandarin
- Hanyu Pinyin: Líng Xiàn

Lingcheng District, formerly Ling County or Lingxian, is a district of the city of Dezhou, Shandong province, China. On 29 October 2014, the State Council approved the conversion of the former Ling County to Lingcheng District.

== Administrative divisions ==
As of 2012, this District is divided to 2 subdistricts, 10 towns and 1 townships.

Subdistricts

- Ande Subdistrict (安德街道)
- Linji Subdistrict (临齐街道)

Towns

- Zhengjiazhai (郑家寨镇)
- Mi (糜镇)
- Songjia (宋家镇)
- Weiwangzhuang (徽王庄镇)
- Shentou (神头镇)
- Zi (滋镇)
- Qiansun (前孙镇)
- Bianlin (边临镇)
- Yidukou (义渡口镇)
- Dingzhuang (丁庄镇)

Townships

- Yuji Township (于集乡)

== Climate ==
Climate data for Lingcheng, elevation 18 m (59 ft), (1991–2020 normals, extremes 1981–2010)
Month	Jan	Feb	Mar	Apr	May	Jun	Jul	Aug	Sep	Oct	Nov	Dec	Year
Record high °C (°F)	17.4 (63.3)	22.2 (72.0)	28.0 (82.4)	30.9 (87.6)	39.0 (102.2)	41.0 (105.8)	41.7 (107.1)	36.2 (97.2)	36.4 (97.5)	31.6 (88.9)	25.2 (77.4)	17.1 (62.8)	41.7 (107.1)
Mean daily maximum °C (°F)	3.4 (38.1)	7.4 (45.3)	13.9 (57.0)	20.6 (69.1)	26.3 (79.3)	31.8 (89.2)	32.1 (89.8)	30.3 (86.5)	26.9 (80.4)	20.9 (69.6)	12.0 (53.6)	4.9 (40.8)	19.2 (66.6)
Daily mean °C (°F)	−2.3 (27.9)	1.2 (34.2)	7.5 (45.5)	14.2 (57.6)	20.1 (68.2)	25.5 (77.9)	27.1 (80.8)	25.5 (77.9)	20.7 (69.3)	14.4 (57.9)	6.1 (43.0)	−0.4 (31.3)	13.3 (56.0)
Mean daily minimum °C (°F)	−6.7 (19.9)	−3.6 (25.5)	2.2 (36.0)	8.5 (47.3)	14.1 (57.4)	19.6 (67.3)	22.8 (73.0)	21.5 (70.7)	15.7 (60.3)	9.2 (48.6)	1.6 (34.9)	−4.5 (23.9)	8.4 (47.1)
Record low °C (°F)	−20.8 (−5.4)	−16.6 (2.1)	−9.8 (14.4)	−3.2 (26.2)	2.5 (36.5)	9.2 (48.6)	16.3 (61.3)	12.7 (54.9)	4.6 (40.3)	−3.2 (26.2)	−16.1 (3.0)	−21.5 (−6.7)	−21.5 (−6.7)
Average precipitation mm (inches)	2.6 (0.10)	8.1 (0.32)	7.9 (0.31)	25.8 (1.02)	43.4 (1.71)	68.5 (2.70)	165.8 (6.53)	137.1 (5.40)	40.4 (1.59)	30.2 (1.19)	15.7 (0.62)	3.7 (0.15)	549.2 (21.64)
Average precipitation days (≥ 0.1 mm)	1.7	2.9	2.8	5.1	6.3	7.6	10.9	9.2	5.6	5.0	3.9	2.3	63.3
Average snowy days	2.4	2.8	1.0	0.2	0	0	0	0	0	0	1.0	1.8	9.2
Average relative humidity (%)	63	60	57	62	66	63	77	83	76	69	69	66	68
Mean monthly sunshine hours	165.6	170.2	227.7	248.2	281.8	255.6	220.5	218.9	211.6	205.2	167.4	161.7	2,534.4
Percentage possible sunshine	54	55	61	63	64	58	50	53	57	60	55	55	57
Source: China Meteorological Administration
