= Pingyuan County, Shandong =

Pingyuan County 平原县
- County
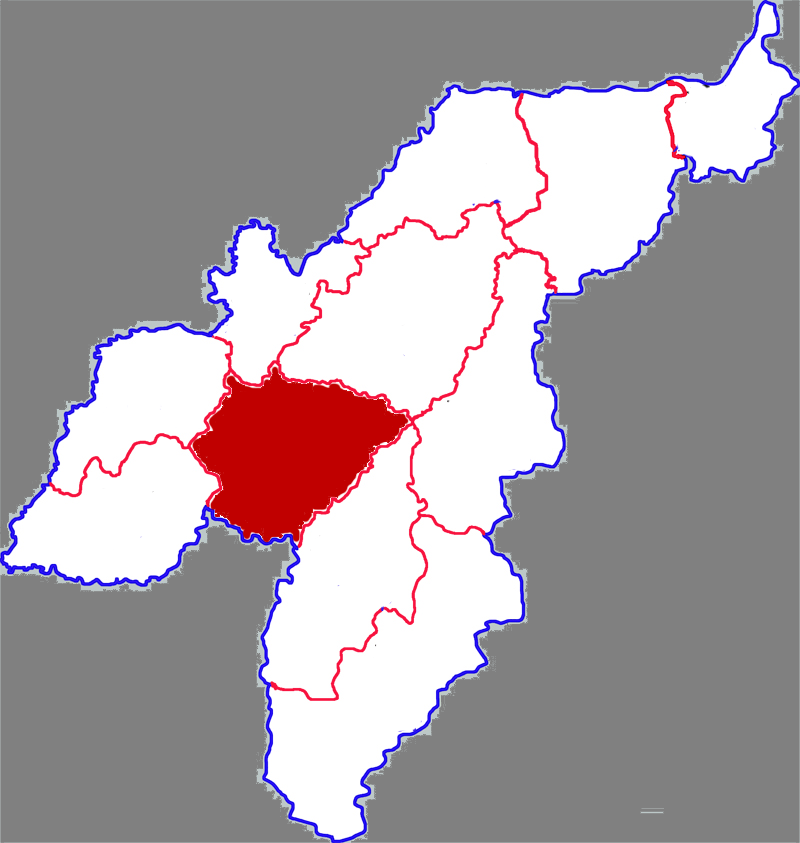
- Pingyuan in Dezhou

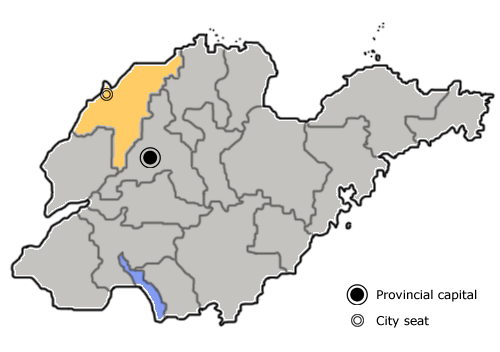
- Dezhou in Shandong
- Coordinates: 37°09′55″N 116°26′03″E
- Country: People's Republic of China
- Province: Shandong
- Prefecture-level city: Dezhou

Area
  - Total: 1,047 km^{2} (404 sq mi)

Population (2019)
  - Total: 447,000
  - Density: 427/km^{2} (1,110/sq mi)
- Time zone: UTC+8 (China Standard)
- Postal code: 253100

Pingyuan County (simplified Chinese: 平原县; traditional Chinese: 平原縣; pinyin: Píngyuán Xiàn) is a county in the northwest of Shandong province, People's Republic of China. It is administered by the prefecture-level city of Dezhou. It has an area of 1,050 square kilometres (410 sq mi).

== History ==
At the end of the Han dynasty, Liu Bei began his political career as prefect of Pingyuan Commandery. The town was one of the starts for the anti-Western Boxer Rebellion.

The population was 437,584 in 1999.

== Administrative divisions ==
As of 2012, this County is divided to 2 subdistricts, 7 towns and 3 townships.

Subdistricts

- Longmen Subdistrict (龙门街道)
- Taoyuan Subdistrict (桃园街道)

Towns

- Wangfenglou (王凤楼镇)
- Qiancao (前曹镇)
- Encheng (恩城镇)
- Wangmiao (王庙镇)
- Wanggaopu (王杲铺镇)
- Zhanghua (张华镇)
- Jiaozhan (腰站镇)

Townships

- Fangzi Township (坊子乡)
- Wangdagua Township (王打卦乡)
- Santang Township (三唐乡)

== Climate ==
Climate data for Pingyuan, elevation 23 m (75 ft), (1991–2020 normals, extremes 1991–present)
Month	Jan	Feb	Mar	Apr	May	Jun	Jul	Aug	Sep	Oct	Nov	Dec	Year
Record high °C (°F)	16.8 (62.2)	22.7 (72.9)	29.0 (84.2)	32.6 (90.7)	37.7 (99.9)	41.1 (106.0)	41.7 (107.1)	36.5 (97.7)	36.2 (97.2)	32.1 (89.8)	25.3 (77.5)	15.6 (60.1)	41.7 (107.1)
Mean daily maximum °C (°F)	3.6 (38.5)	7.6 (45.7)	14.2 (57.6)	20.8 (69.4)	26.6 (79.9)	31.7 (89.1)	32.0 (89.6)	30.4 (86.7)	27.0 (80.6)	21.0 (69.8)	12.2 (54.0)	5.2 (41.4)	19.4 (66.9)
Daily mean °C (°F)	−1.9 (28.6)	1.6 (34.9)	7.9 (46.2)	14.6 (58.3)	20.5 (68.9)	25.5 (77.9)	27.1 (80.8)	25.6 (78.1)	20.9 (69.6)	14.4 (57.9)	6.4 (43.5)	−0.1 (31.8)	13.5 (56.4)
Mean daily minimum °C (°F)	−6.0 (21.2)	−2.9 (26.8)	2.8 (37.0)	9.1 (48.4)	14.8 (58.6)	20.0 (68.0)	23.0 (73.4)	21.8 (71.2)	16.2 (61.2)	9.4 (48.9)	2.1 (35.8)	−3.9 (25.0)	8.9 (48.0)
Record low °C (°F)	−18.8 (−1.8)	−13.9 (7.0)	−8.4 (16.9)	−2.1 (28.2)	4.9 (40.8)	10.6 (51.1)	16.8 (62.2)	12.9 (55.2)	5.4 (41.7)	−1.9 (28.6)	−14.7 (5.5)	−16.8 (1.8)	−18.8 (−1.8)
Average precipitation mm (inches)	3.4 (0.13)	9.2 (0.36)	8.8 (0.35)	28.8 (1.13)	44.2 (1.74)	75.3 (2.96)	161.4 (6.35)	145.7 (5.74)	40.4 (1.59)	29.3 (1.15)	16.3 (0.64)	4.2 (0.17)	567 (22.31)
Average precipitation days (≥ 0.1 mm)	2.1	3.2	2.7	5.1	6.3	7.5	10.7	9.6	6.1	5.0	3.9	2.2	64.4
Average snowy days	2.6	2.7	0.8	0.2	0	0	0	0	0	0	0.9	1.8	9
Average relative humidity (%)	59	55	53	58	63	62	77	82	75	68	66	63	65
Mean monthly sunshine hours	167.5	167.2	220.7	241.5	270.9	240.3	203.9	199.7	198.1	195.7	161.7	156.7	2,423.9
Percentage possible sunshine	54	54	59	61	62	55	46	48	54	57	54	53	55
Source: China Meteorological Administration
