= Anren, Shandong =

Anren 安仁镇
- Town
- Location in Shandong Anren (China)
- Coordinates: 36°51′50″N 116°31′27″E
- Country: People's Republic of China
- Province: Shandong
- Prefecture-level city: Dezhou
- County-level city: Yucheng
- Time zone: UTC+8 (China Standard)

Anren (Chinese: 安仁镇) is a town in Yucheng, Dezhou, in northwestern Shandong province, China.
