= Yucheng, Shandong =

Yucheng 禹城市
- County-level city
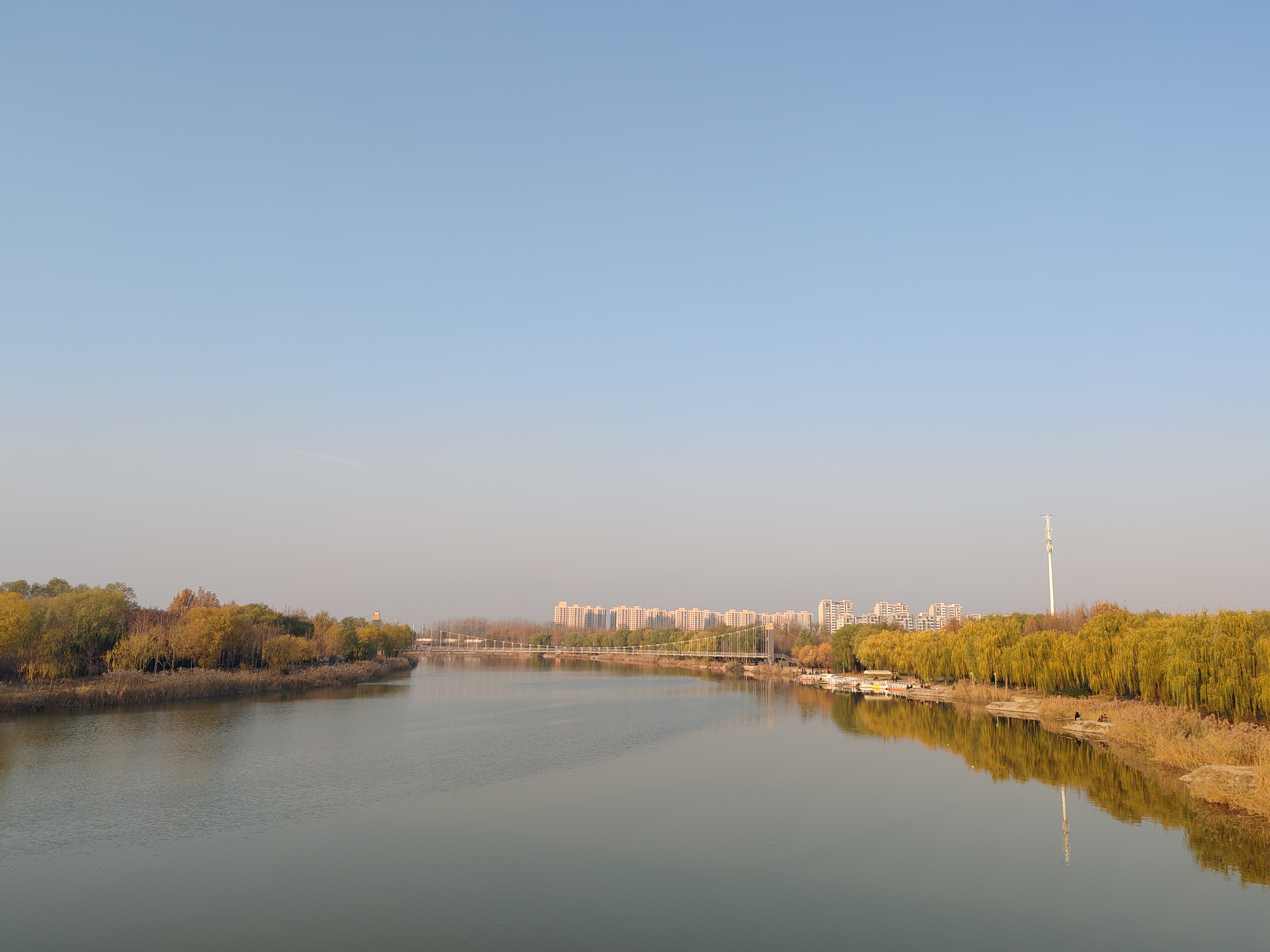
- Tuhai River in Yucheng

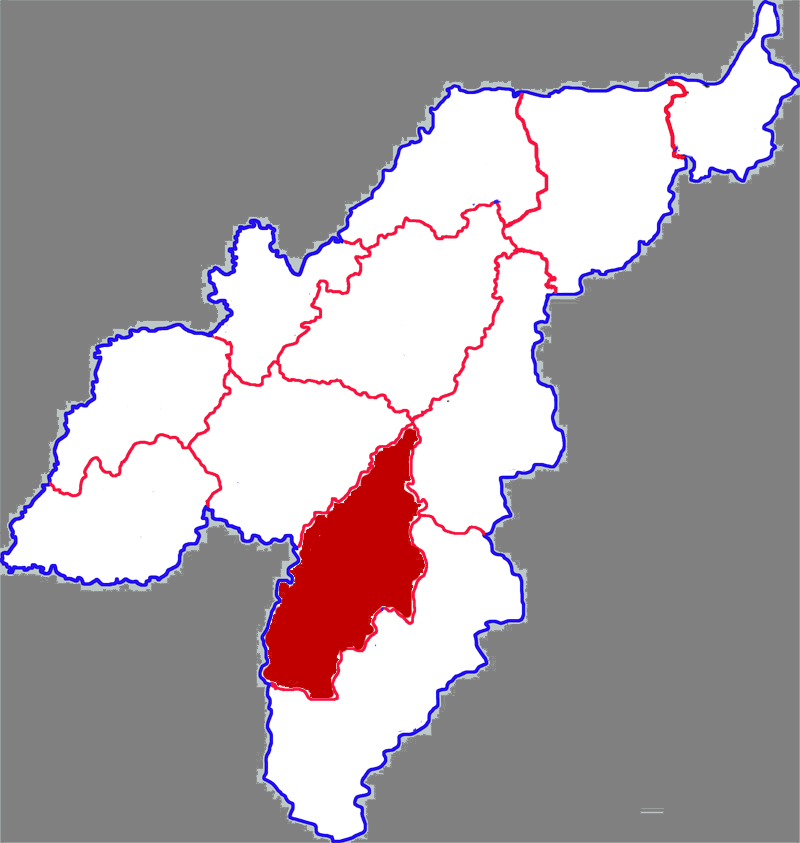
- Yucheng in Dezhou

- Location in Shandong
- Coordinates: 36°56′02″N 116°38′17″E
- Country: People's Republic of China
- Province: Shandong
- Prefecture-level city: Dezhou

Area
  - Total: 992 km^{2} (383 sq mi)

Population (2019)
  - Total: 514,300
- Time zone: UTC+8 (China Standard)
- Postal code: 251200

Yucheng (Chinese: 禹城; pinyin: Yǔchéng) is a county-level city located in the northwest of Shandong province, China. It is administered by the prefecture-level city of Dezhou.

The population was 495,387 in 1999.

== History ==
The name of "Yucheng" means "the city of Great Yu", who is believed to be the first king of the Xia dynasty, and an ancient hero specializing in fighting with flood. The county of Yucheng was set up during the Tang dynasty in 692 AD.

== Administrative divisions ==
As of 2012, this city is divided to 1 subdistrict, 7 towns and 3 townships.

Subdistricts

- Shizhong Subdistrict (市中街道)

Towns

- Lun (伦镇)
- Fangsi (房寺镇)
- Zhangzhuang (张庄镇)
- Xindian (辛店镇)
- Anren (安仁镇)
- Xinzhai (辛寨镇)
- Liangjia (梁家镇)

Townships

- Litun Township (李屯乡)
- Shiliwang Township (十里望乡)
- Juzhen Township (莒镇乡)

== Climate ==
Climate data for Yucheng, elevation 21 m (69 ft), (1991–2020 normals, extremes 1991–present)
Month	Jan	Feb	Mar	Apr	May	Jun	Jul	Aug	Sep	Oct	Nov	Dec	Year
Record high °C (°F)	17.6 (63.7)	22.0 (71.6)	29.0 (84.2)	33.4 (92.1)	37.7 (99.9)	41.2 (106.2)	41.4 (106.5)	37.1 (98.8)	36.7 (98.1)	32.2 (90.0)	25.5 (77.9)	17.3 (63.1)	41.4 (106.5)
Mean daily maximum °C (°F)	3.9 (39.0)	7.9 (46.2)	14.4 (57.9)	21.1 (70.0)	26.7 (80.1)	31.8 (89.2)	32.2 (90.0)	30.6 (87.1)	27.2 (81.0)	21.2 (70.2)	12.5 (54.5)	5.5 (41.9)	19.6 (67.3)
Daily mean °C (°F)	−1.4 (29.5)	2.2 (36.0)	8.4 (47.1)	15.1 (59.2)	20.9 (69.6)	25.9 (78.6)	27.5 (81.5)	25.9 (78.6)	21.3 (70.3)	15.0 (59.0)	7.0 (44.6)	0.4 (32.7)	14.0 (57.2)
Mean daily minimum °C (°F)	−5.6 (21.9)	−2.4 (27.7)	3.4 (38.1)	9.7 (49.5)	15.4 (59.7)	20.6 (69.1)	23.4 (74.1)	22.1 (71.8)	16.6 (61.9)	10 (50)	2.6 (36.7)	−3.7 (25.3)	9.3 (48.8)
Record low °C (°F)	−19.8 (−3.6)	−15.0 (5.0)	−9.0 (15.8)	−3.1 (26.4)	3.4 (38.1)	9.8 (49.6)	16.8 (62.2)	12.7 (54.9)	5.2 (41.4)	−1.2 (29.8)	−16.2 (2.8)	−17.6 (0.3)	−19.8 (−3.6)
Average precipitation mm (inches)	3.9 (0.15)	9.9 (0.39)	9.9 (0.39)	33.4 (1.31)	48.7 (1.92)	91.7 (3.61)	149.7 (5.89)	139.8 (5.50)	45.1 (1.78)	31.7 (1.25)	19.5 (0.77)	4.4 (0.17)	587.7 (23.13)
Average precipitation days (≥ 0.1 mm)	2.0	3.0	2.9	4.9	6.6	7.8	11.3	9.8	6.2	4.9	4.1	2.4	65.9
Average snowy days	2.7	2.8	0.9	0.2	0	0	0	0	0	0	0.8	2.1	9.5
Average relative humidity (%)	60	56	52	58	62	61	76	80	74	67	66	63	65
Mean monthly sunshine hours	165.1	167.1	218.8	237.6	265.7	236.1	197.5	202.5	203.2	194.7	160.2	160.2	2,408.7
Percentage possible sunshine	53	54	59	60	61	54	45	49	55	57	53	54	55
Source: China Meteorological Administration
