= Dezhou University =

Public university in Shandong, China

- 德州学院 (Chinese)
- Type: Public university
- Established: 1971; 55 years ago
- Location: Dezhou, Shandong, China; 37°28′17″N 116°19′54″E
- Website: DZU English Website; DZU Chinese Website

Chinese name
- Simplified Chinese: 德州学院
- Traditional Chinese: 德州學院
Transcriptions
Standard Mandarin
- Hanyu Pinyin: Dézhōu Xuéyuàn

Dezhou University (abbreviated as DZU; Chinese: 德州学院) is a public university in Shandong, China. It was founded in 1971.

In 2021, the number of students was around 25,000.

It is a comprehensive university offering many degrees in liberal arts, science, engineering, arts, pharmacy and nursing. Undergraduate and graduate programs are offered.

== Photos ==
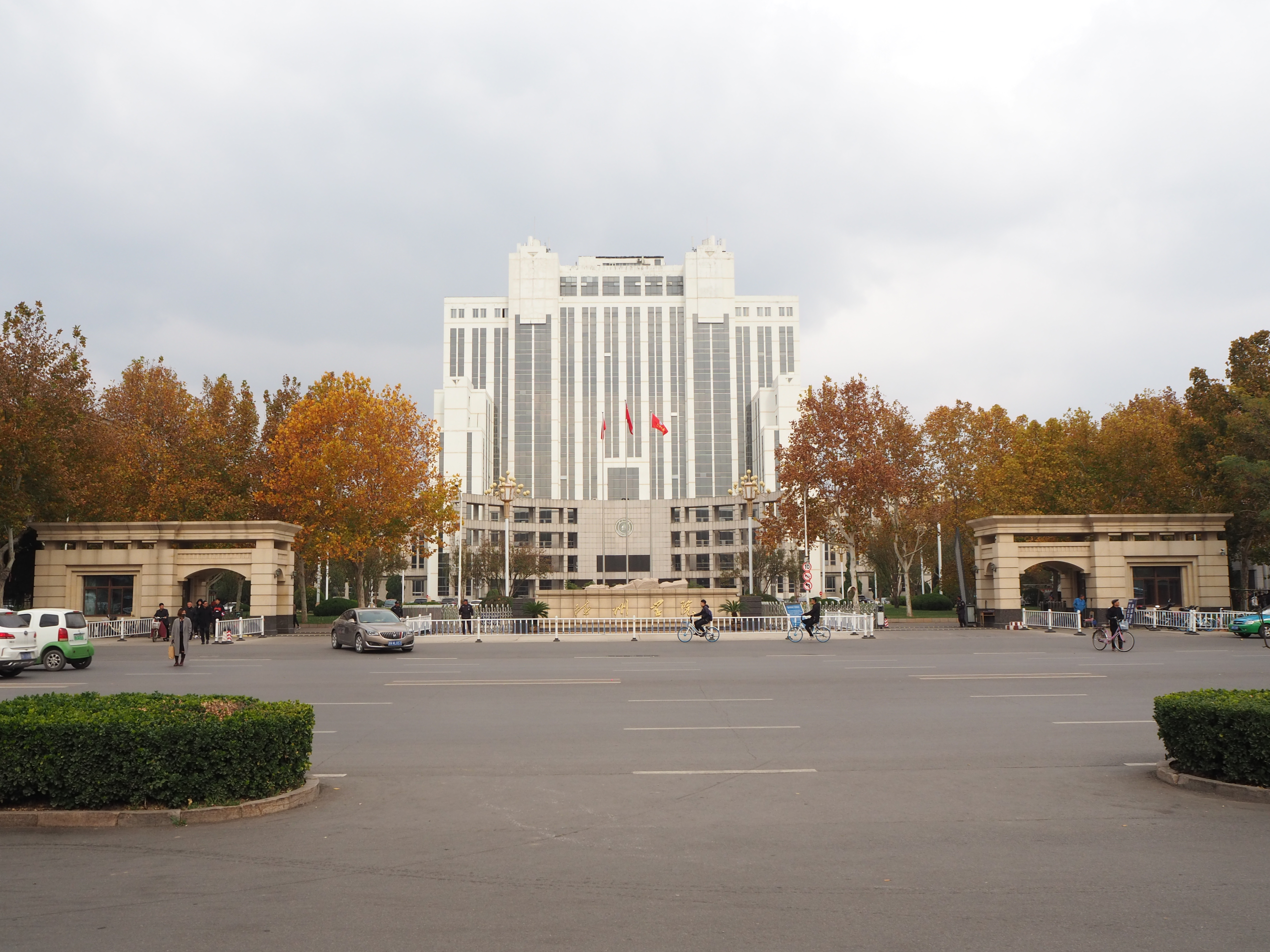
Main Building

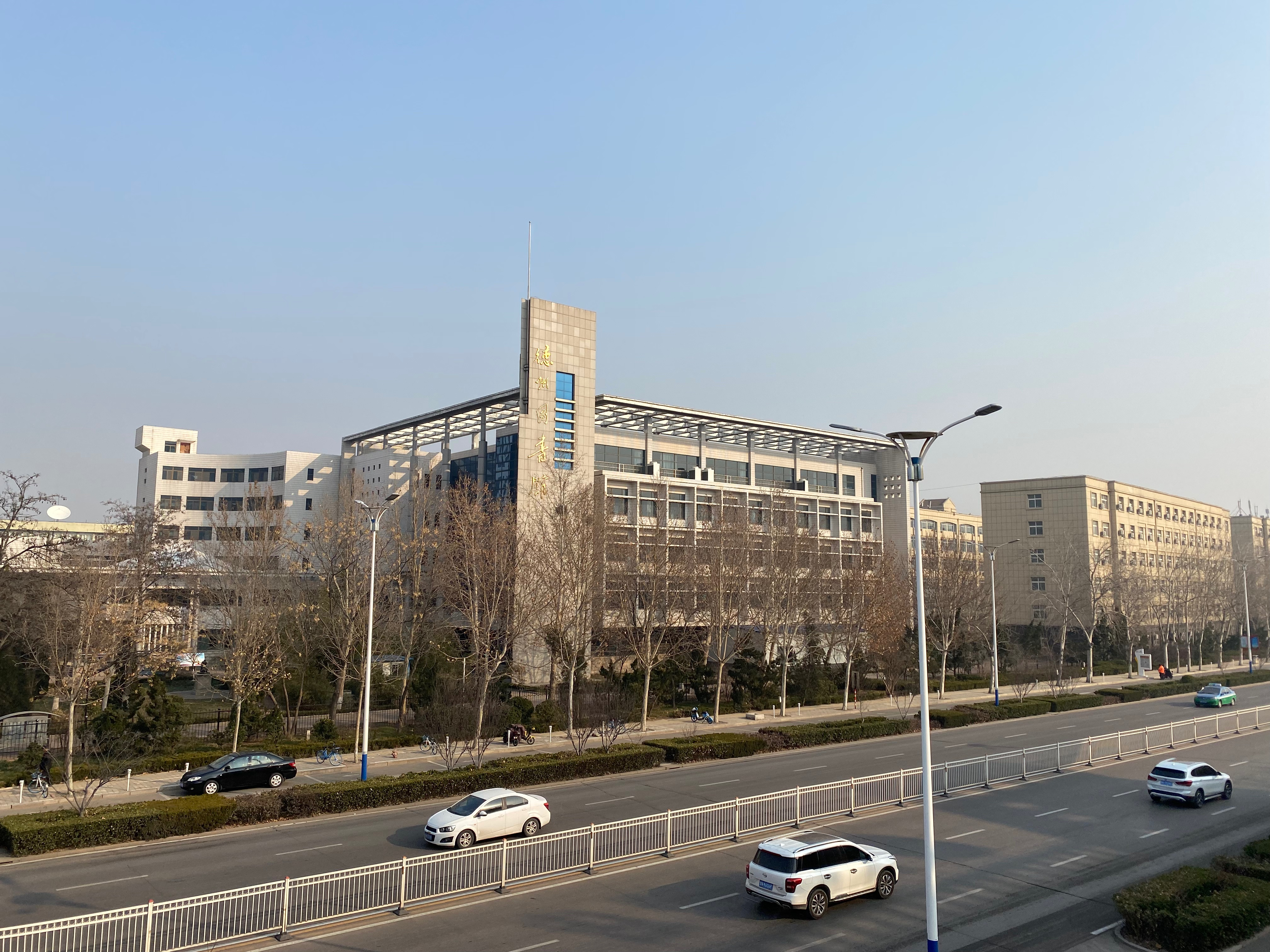
Library

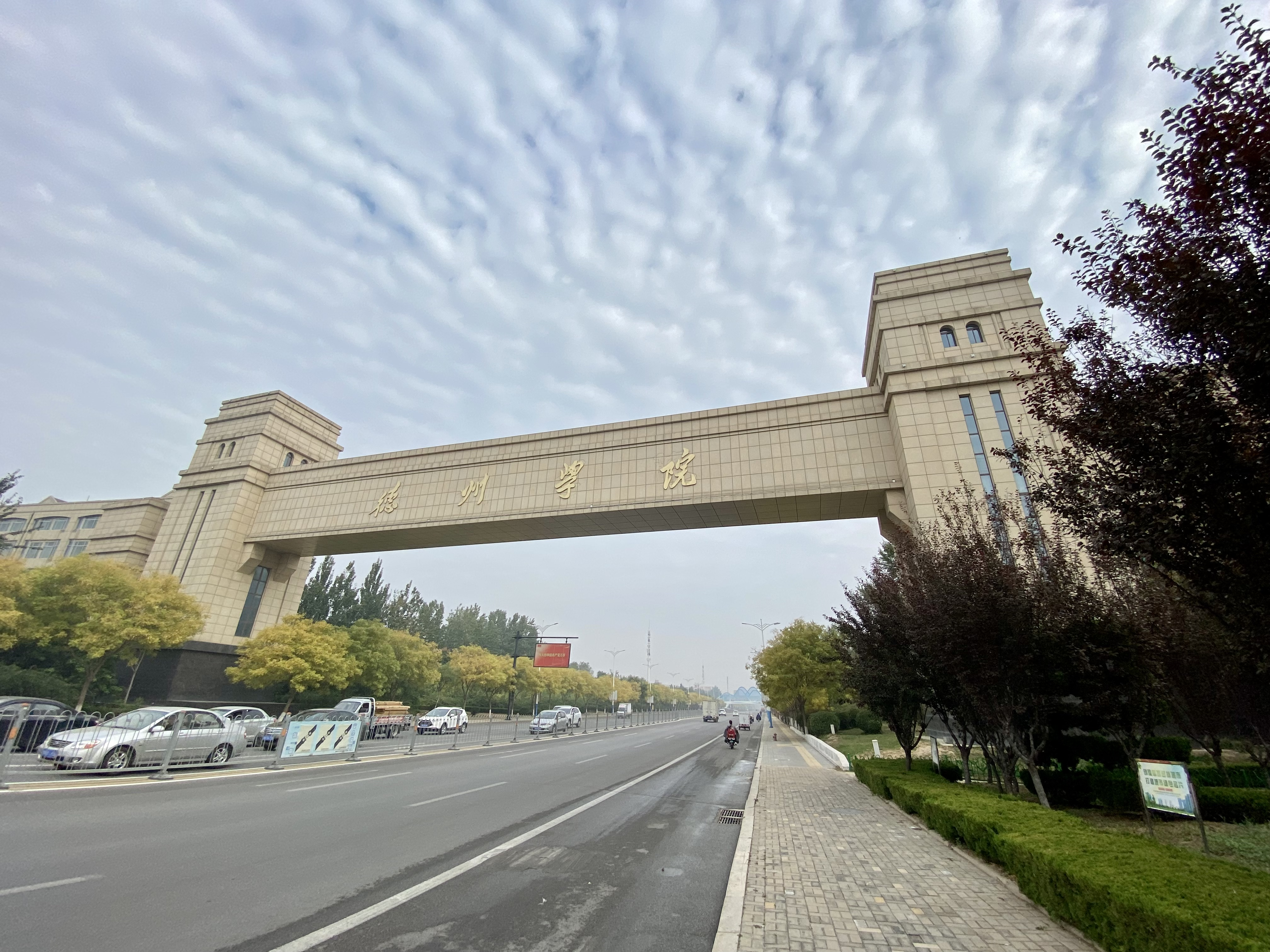
Crossway

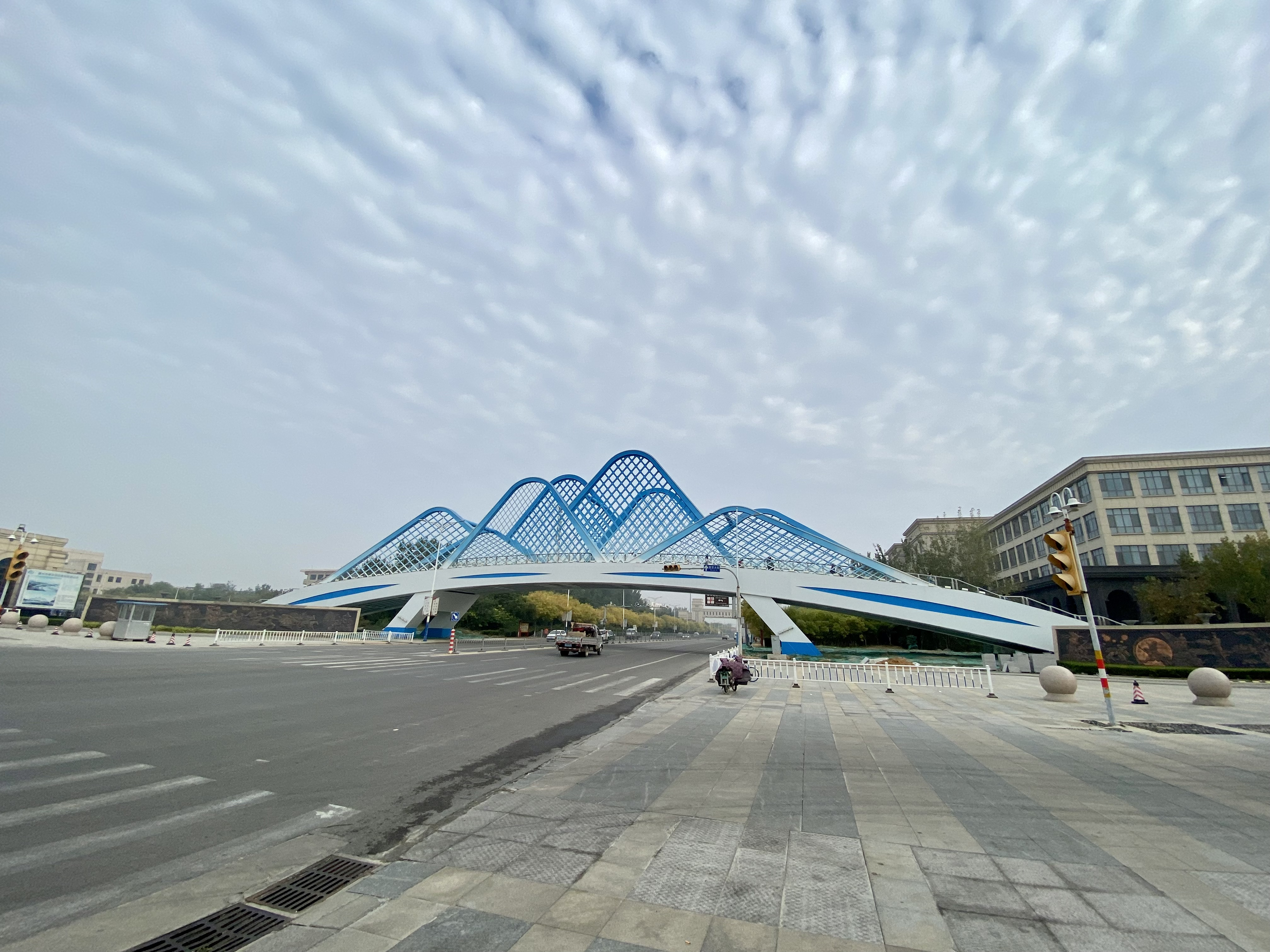
Bridge Between Campuses

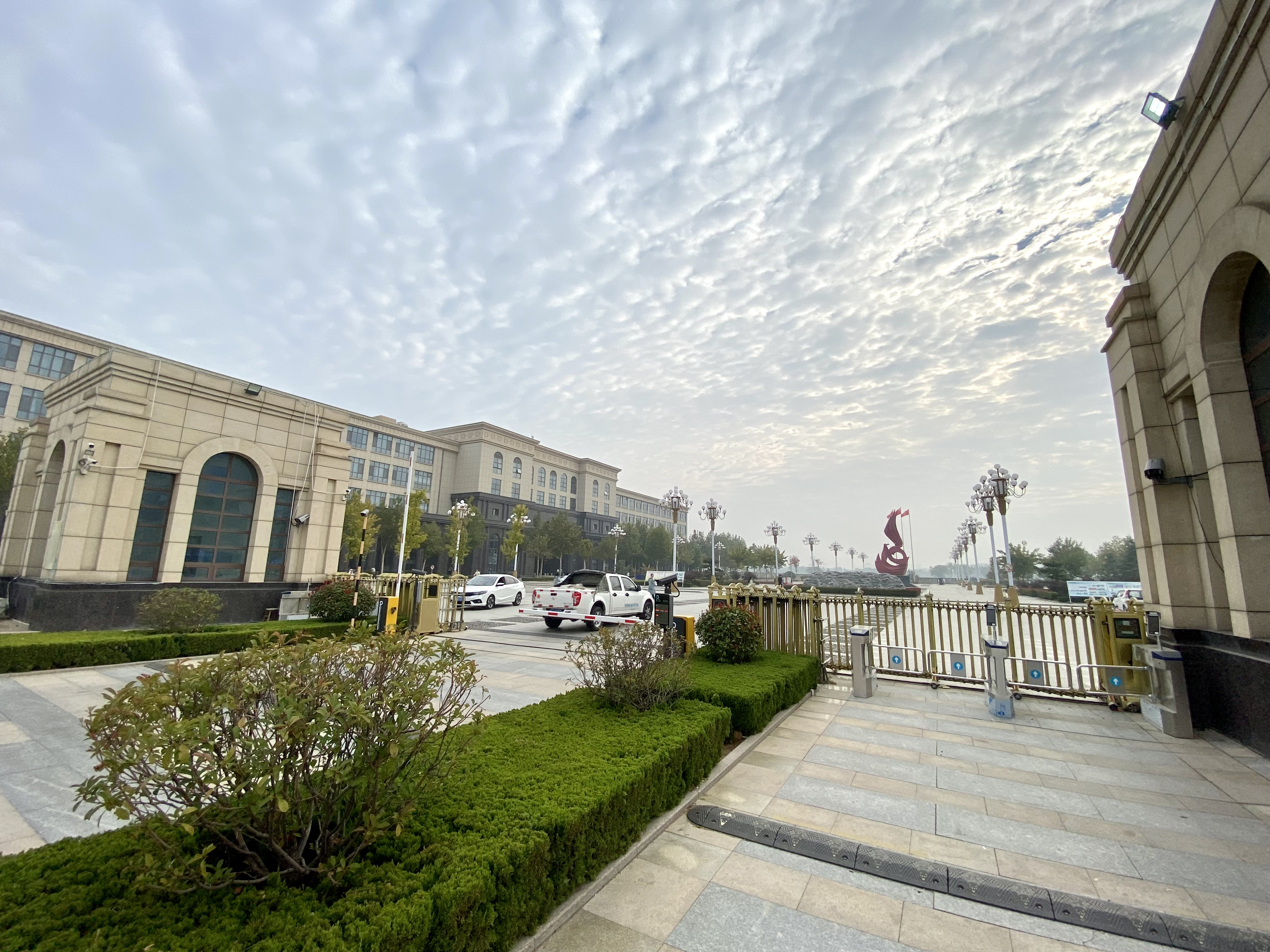
East Campus

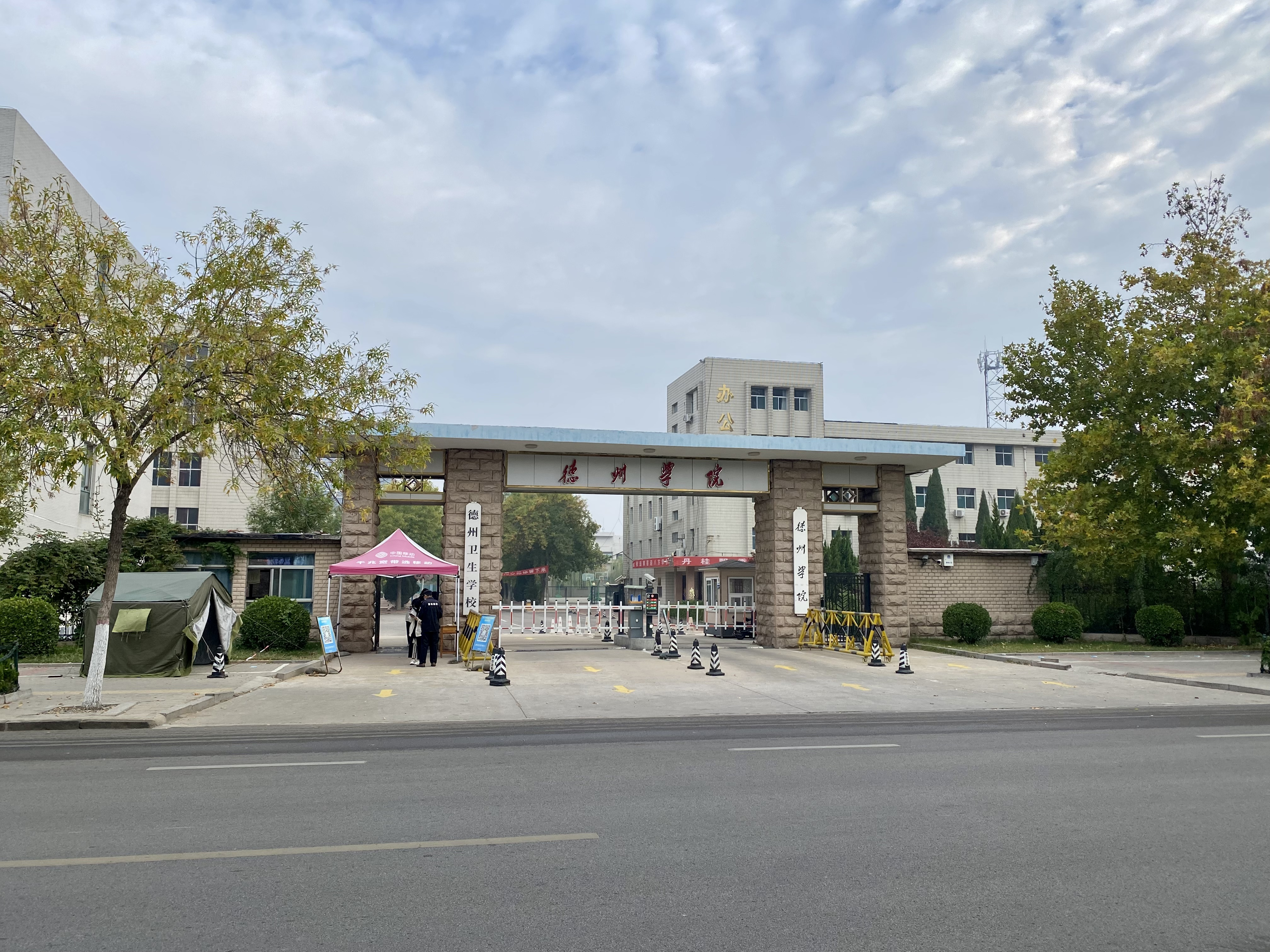
South Campus

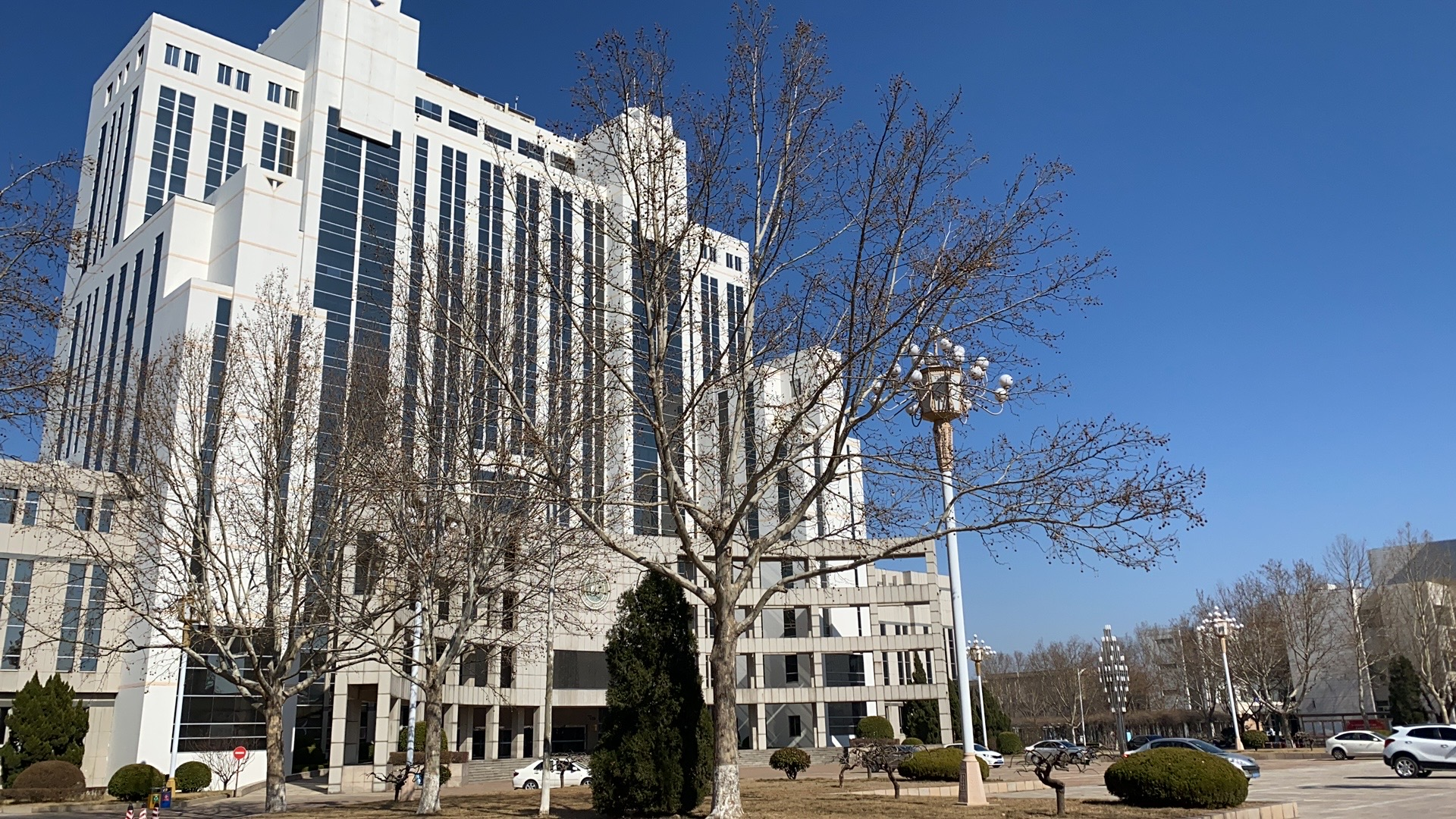
Main Building

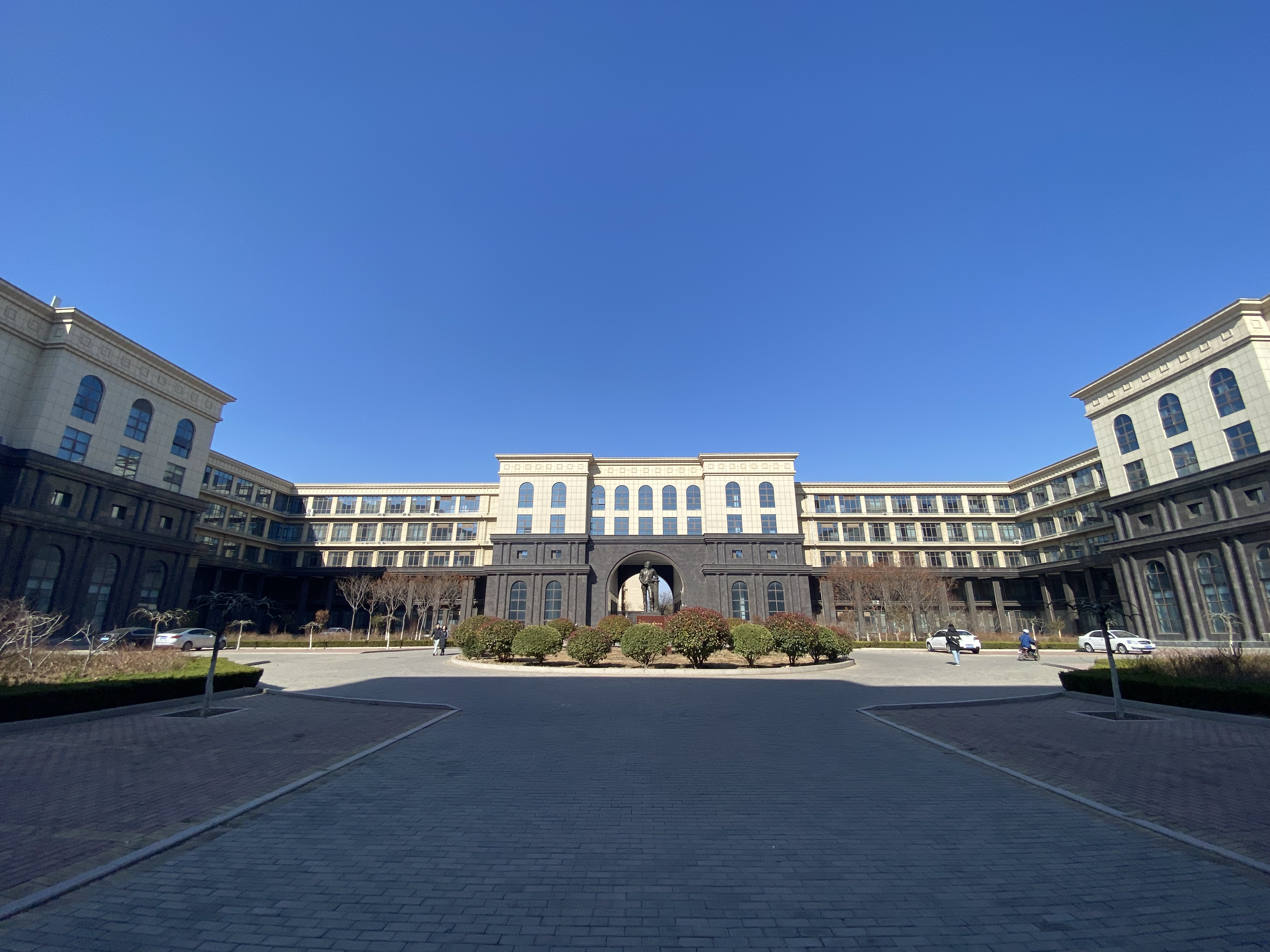
East Campus

== Ranking ==
DZU ranks 399th on China mainland university ranking of 2024.

== See also ==
- Dezhou
