= Linyi County, Dezhou =

Linyi County 临邑县
- County
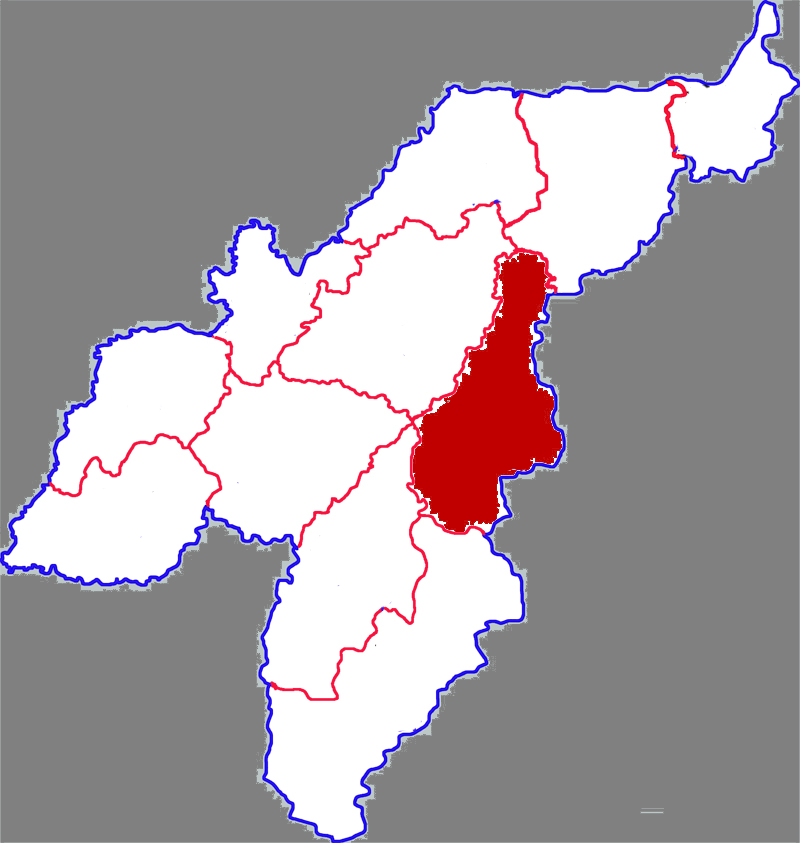
- Linyi in Dezhou

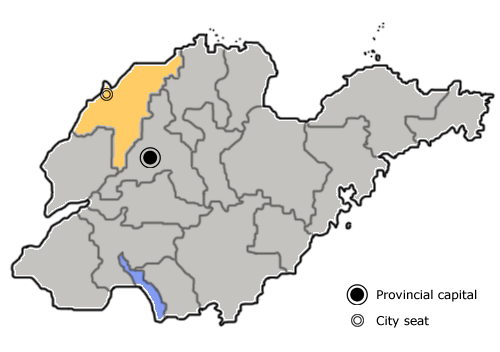
- Dezhou in Shandong
- Coordinates: 37°11′24″N 116°52′01″E
- Country: People's Republic of China
- Province: Shandong
- Prefecture-level city: Dezhou

Area
  - Total: 1,016 km^{2} (392 sq mi)

Population (2019)
  - Total: 533,300
  - Density: 524.9/km^{2} (1,359/sq mi)
- Time zone: UTC+8 (China Standard)
- Postal code: 251500

Linyi County (Chinese: 临邑县; pinyin: Línyì Xiàn) is a county in the northwest of Shandong province, People's Republic of China. It is administered by the prefecture-level city of Dezhou.

The population was 509,846 in 1999.

== Administrative divisions ==
As of 2012, this county is divided to 3 subdistricts, 8 towns and 1 township.

Subdistricts

- Xingdong Subdistrict (邢侗街道)
- Hengyuan Subdistrict (恒源街道)
- Liupan Subdistrict (临盘街道)

Towns

- Linyi (临邑镇)
- Linnan (临南镇)
- Deping (德平镇)
- Linzi (林子镇)
- Xinglong (兴隆镇)
- Mengsi (孟寺镇)
- Cuijia (翟家镇)
- Lihewu (理合务镇)

Townships

- Su'an Township (宿安乡)

== Climate ==
Climate data for Linyi, elevation 19 m (62 ft), (1991–2020 normals, extremes 1981–2010)
Month	Jan	Feb	Mar	Apr	May	Jun	Jul	Aug	Sep	Oct	Nov	Dec	Year
Record high °C (°F)	17.2 (63.0)	22.5 (72.5)	29.0 (84.2)	32.1 (89.8)	39.3 (102.7)	41.1 (106.0)	41.3 (106.3)	36.5 (97.7)	36.2 (97.2)	31.2 (88.2)	25.8 (78.4)	16.8 (62.2)	41.3 (106.3)
Mean daily maximum °C (°F)	3.5 (38.3)	7.5 (45.5)	14.1 (57.4)	20.9 (69.6)	26.6 (79.9)	31.6 (88.9)	32.1 (89.8)	30.3 (86.5)	27.0 (80.6)	20.9 (69.6)	12.2 (54.0)	5.1 (41.2)	19.3 (66.8)
Daily mean °C (°F)	−1.9 (28.6)	1.6 (34.9)	8.0 (46.4)	14.8 (58.6)	20.7 (69.3)	25.7 (78.3)	27.3 (81.1)	25.7 (78.3)	21.1 (70.0)	14.7 (58.5)	6.6 (43.9)	0.0 (32.0)	13.7 (56.7)
Mean daily minimum °C (°F)	−6.0 (21.2)	−3.0 (26.6)	2.8 (37.0)	9.2 (48.6)	15.0 (59.0)	20.2 (68.4)	23.1 (73.6)	21.9 (71.4)	16.4 (61.5)	9.6 (49.3)	2.1 (35.8)	−4.0 (24.8)	8.9 (48.1)
Record low °C (°F)	−19.9 (−3.8)	−15.2 (4.6)	−8.5 (16.7)	−1.2 (29.8)	5.0 (41.0)	10.9 (51.6)	16.3 (61.3)	12.7 (54.9)	5.9 (42.6)	−2.8 (27.0)	−14.1 (6.6)	−19.5 (−3.1)	−19.9 (−3.8)
Average precipitation mm (inches)	3.5 (0.14)	9.0 (0.35)	8.0 (0.31)	26.8 (1.06)	44.6 (1.76)	74.8 (2.94)	160.7 (6.33)	153.8 (6.06)	41.9 (1.65)	31.8 (1.25)	17.8 (0.70)	3.9 (0.15)	576.6 (22.7)
Average precipitation days (≥ 0.1 mm)	1.9	2.8	2.8	4.9	6.2	7.5	11.1	9.7	6.0	5.0	4.1	2.4	64.4
Average snowy days	2.8	3.0	1.1	0.2	0	0	0	0	0	0	1.0	2.1	10.2
Average relative humidity (%)	60	56	52	57	61	60	75	81	73	66	66	63	64
Mean monthly sunshine hours	167.7	170.9	224.6	243.2	274.0	245.0	211.8	209.1	210.1	203.0	167.9	165.3	2,492.6
Percentage possible sunshine	54	55	60	61	62	56	48	50	57	59	56	56	56
Source: China Meteorological Administration
