= Dezhou =

Dezhou 德州市 Tehchow
- Prefecture-level city
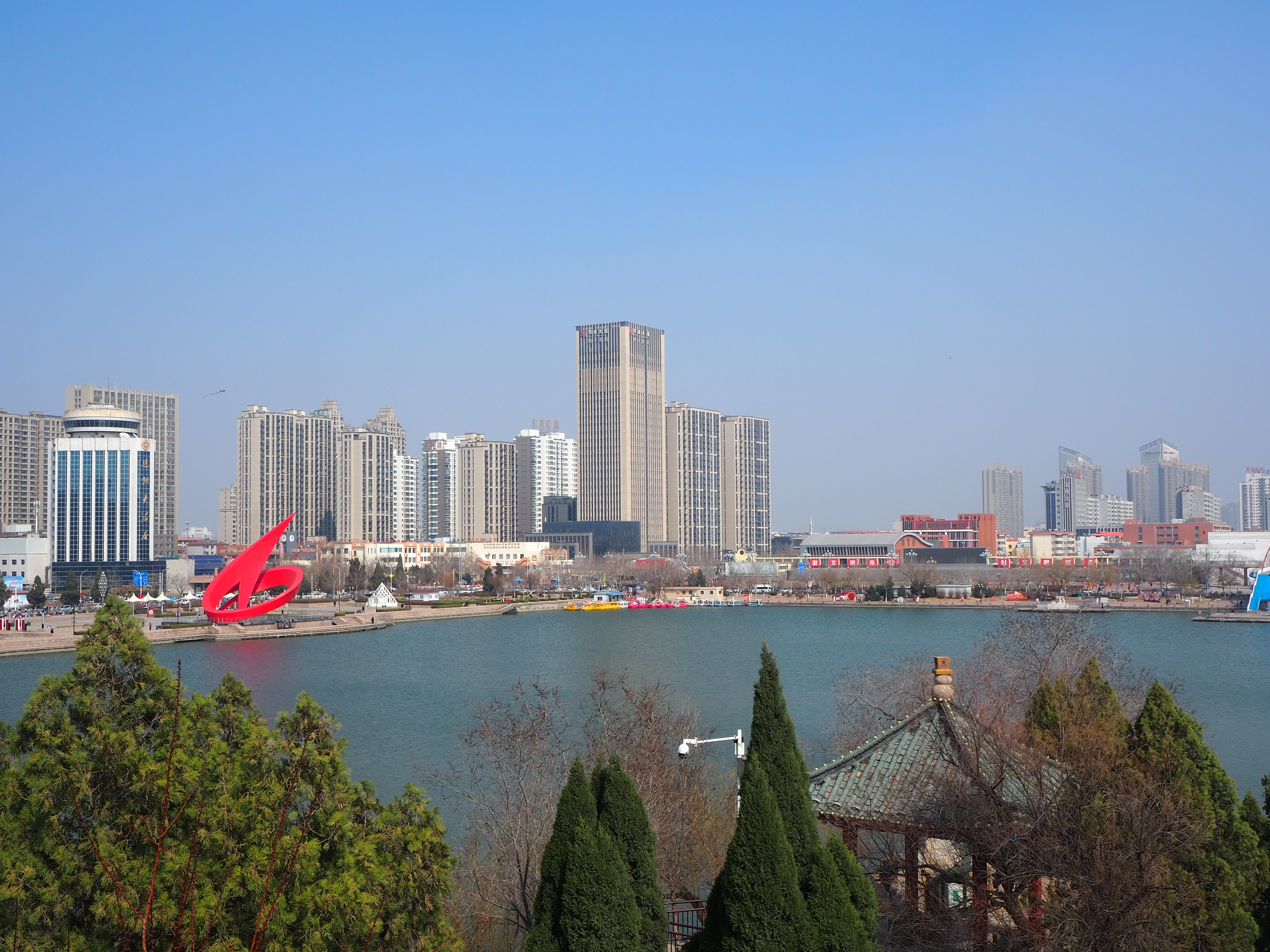
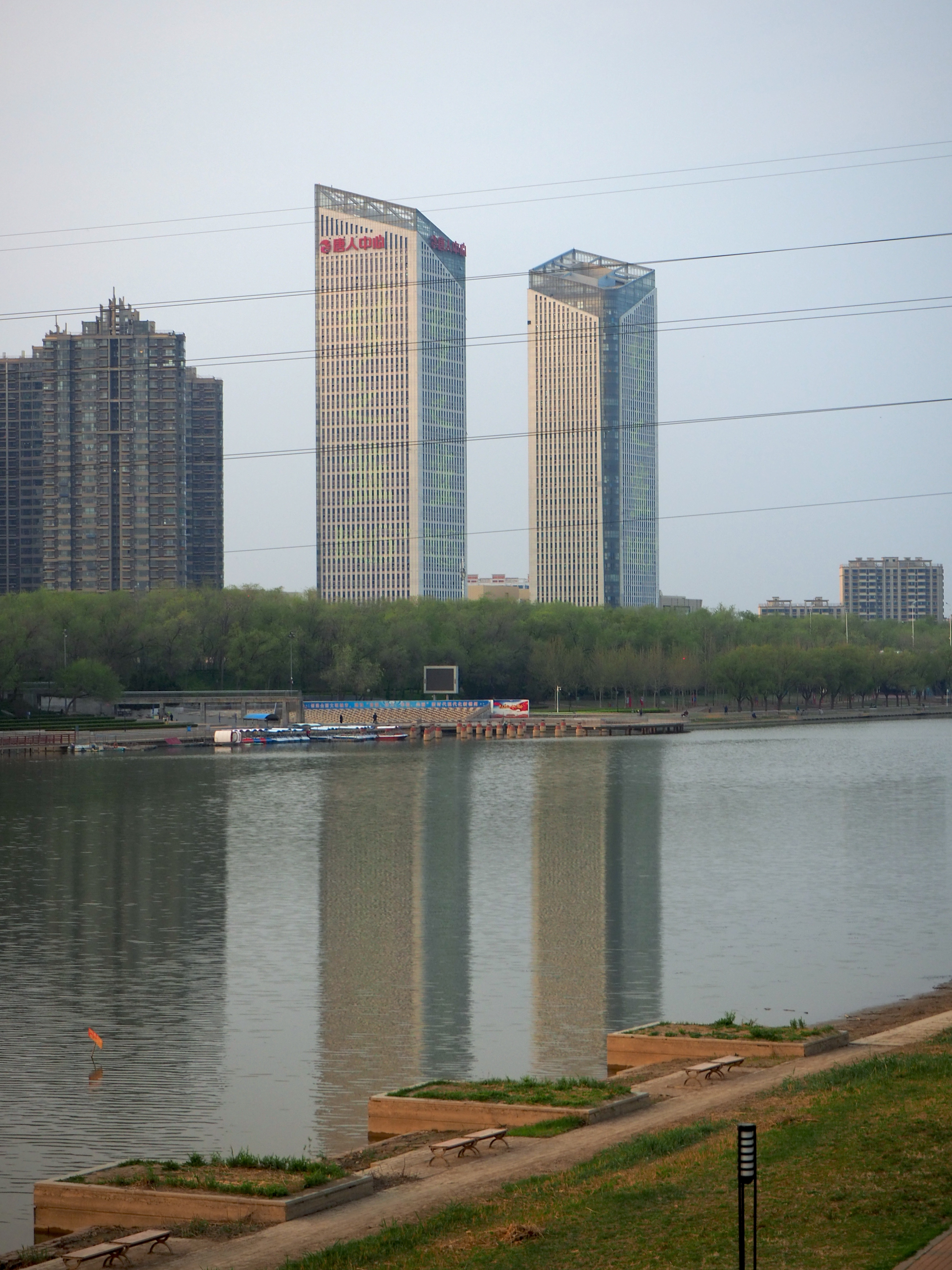
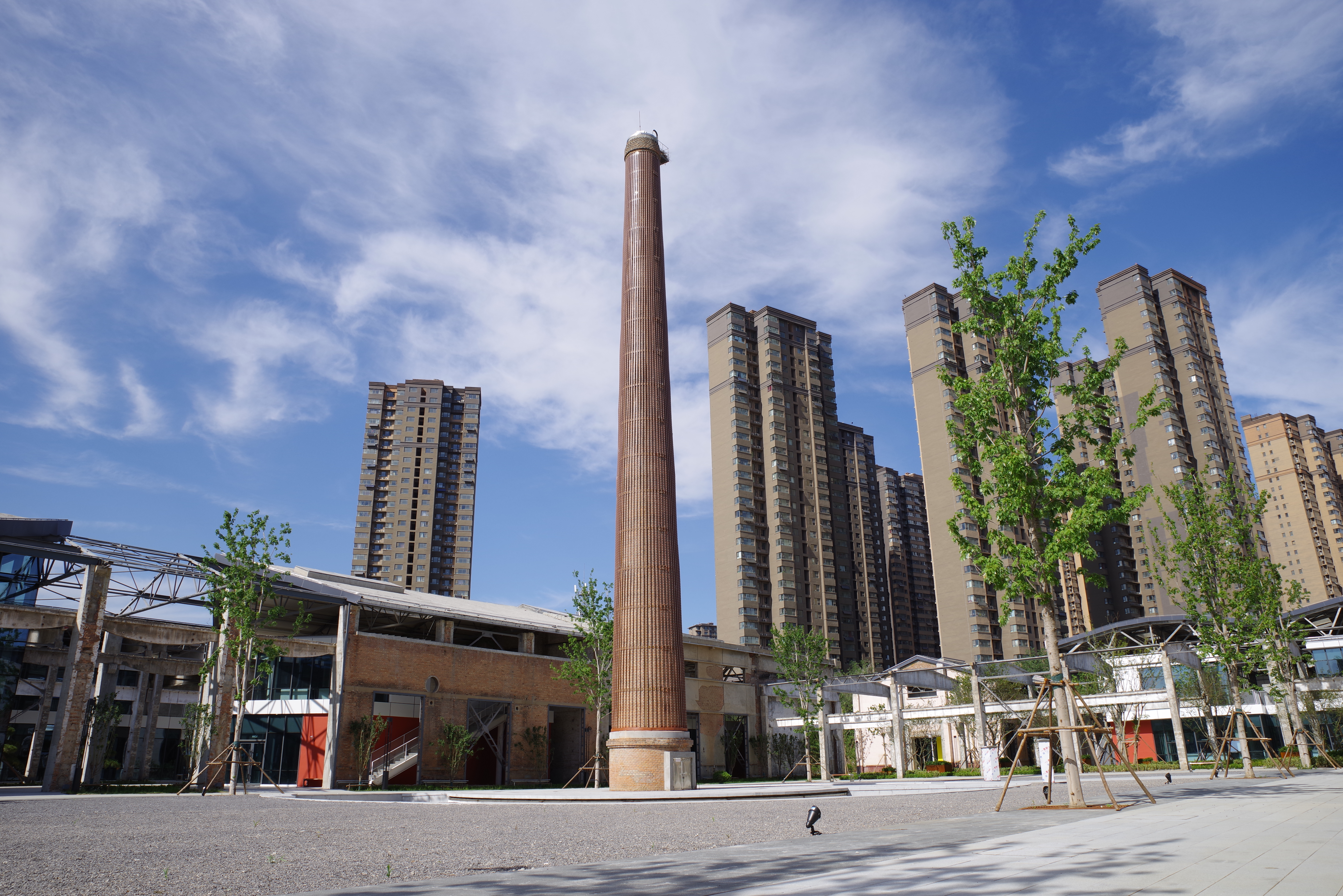
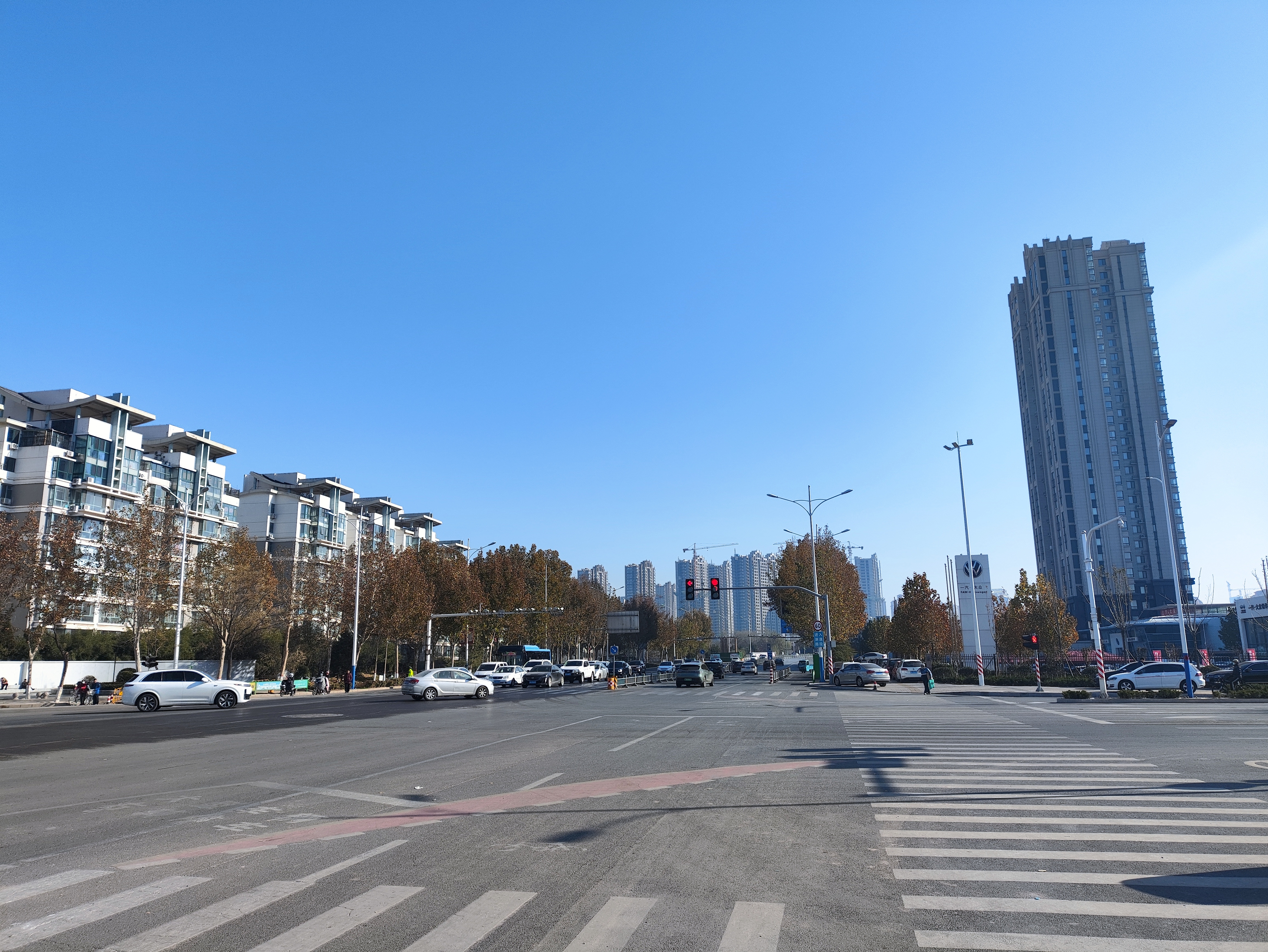
- Dezhou Xinhu view from Diecuishan Dezhou Tangren Center Building Degong Creation Park A street in Decheng

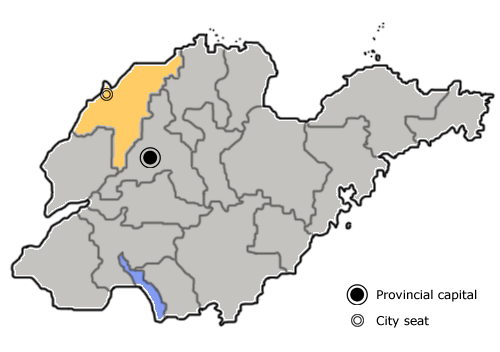
- location of Dezhou in Shandong
- Interactive map of Dezhou
- Coordinates (Dezhou municipal government): 37°26′10″N 116°21′32″E
- Country: People's Republic of China
- Province: Shandong
- County-level divisions: 11
- Municipal seat: Decheng District

Government
  - CPC Secretary: Tian Weidong(田卫东)
  - Mayor: Zhu Kaiguo(朱开国)

Area
  - Prefecture-level city: 10,361 km^{2} (4,000 sq mi)

Population (2019)
  - Prefecture-level city: 5,748,500
  - Density: 554.82/km^{2} (1,437.0/sq mi)
  - Urban: 986,192
  - Metro: 986,192

GDP
  - Prefecture-level city: CN¥ 338 billion US$ 51 billion
  - Per capita: CN¥ 58,252; US$ 8,803
- Time zone: UTC+08:00 (China Standard)
- Postal code: 253000
- Area code: 0534
- ISO 3166 code: CN-SD-14
- License Plate Prefix: 鲁N
- Website: dz.gov.cn

Dezhou (Chinese: 德州; pinyin: Dézhōu) is a prefecture-level city in northwestern Shandong province, People's Republic of China. It borders the provincial capital of Jinan to the southeast, Liaocheng to the southwest, Binzhou to the northeast, and the province of Hebei to the north.

== History ==
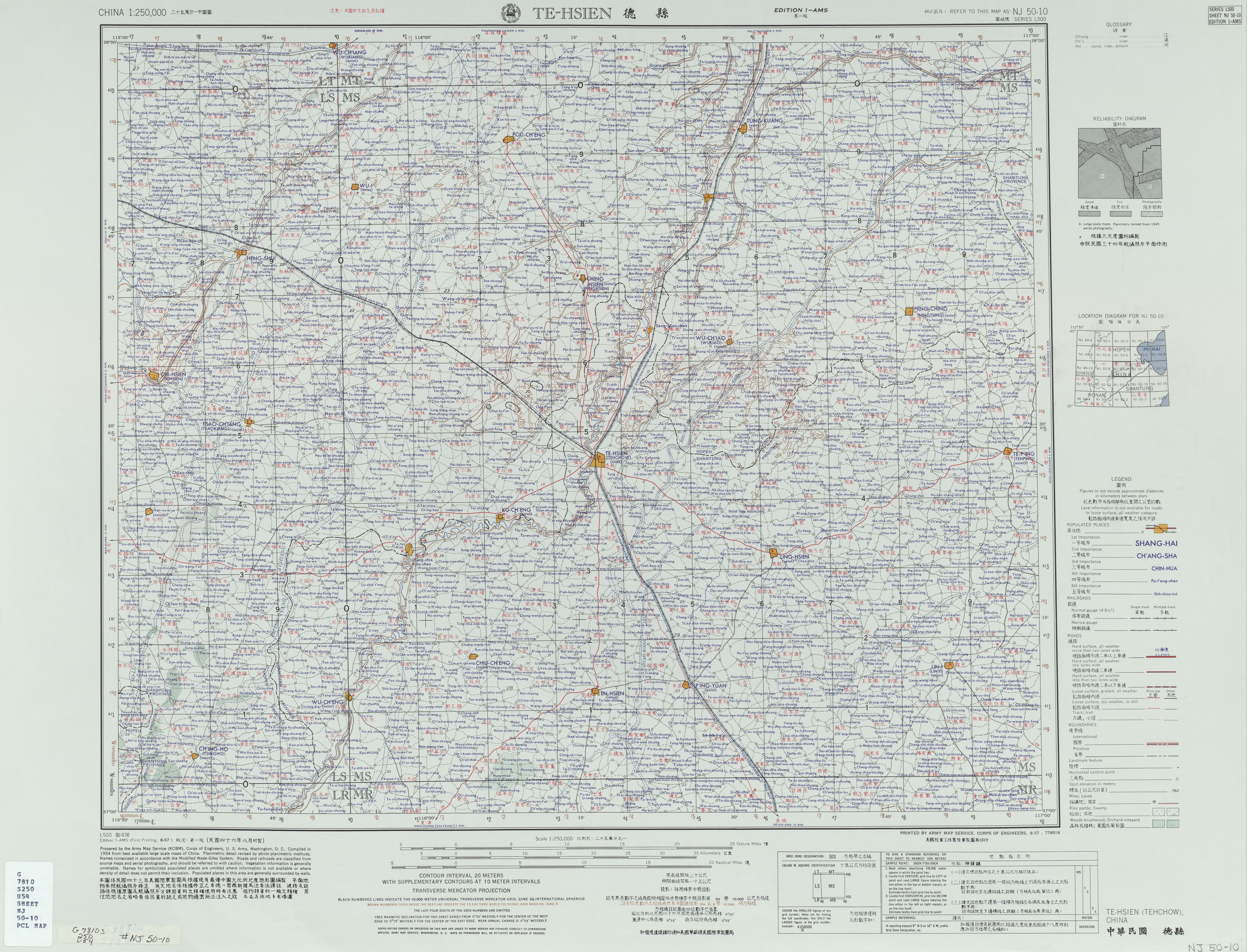
Map including Dezhou (labeled as TE-HSIEN (TEHCHOW) (walled) 德縣) (AMS, 1954)

=== Sulu royal family ===
In 1417, the pre-sultanate East King of Sulu, Paduka Pahala, sailed to China on a tribute mission to the Yongle Emperor. While on his way home from the mission, he died in Dezhou, and his two sons and wife were left in the care of Hui people in the city. The two families descended from the two sons were given the surnames An and Wen by the Ming dynasty. They lived through the Ming and Qing dynasties, and still live in Dezhou today.

Soon after, Sharif ul-Hāshim of Sulu arrived in Sulu and married a princess of the previous non-Hashemite royal family, founding the Sulu Sultanate. Since then, various Tausūg delegations from Sulu have visited Dezhou to meet the descendants of the previous royal family.

=== Death of Empress Xiaoxianchun ===
While on a boat in Dezhou, on 5 April 1748, (Note: the 8th day of the 3rd month of the 13th year of Qianlong) the Qianlong Emperor's first empress, Empress Xiaoxianchun, died at the age of 37. The circumstances of her death are not well documented by historical sources.

=== Prefecture-level city ===
Dezhou became a prefecture-level city in 1994 following the restructuring of Dezhou Prefecture into the present municipal administration. the former county-level Dezhou City becoming Decheng District. Laoling and Yucheng became the 2 cities under the prefecture-level city Dezhou.

Lingcheng District was established in 2014, while Tianqu New District was established in 2021 as Dezhou's central urban area and industy development zone.

== Administration ==
The municipality of Dezhou comprises thirteen county-level sub divisions:

Districts

- Decheng District (德城区). The government of the prefecture-level city is located in this sub division.
- Lingcheng District (陵城区)

Cities

Cities (县级市 xianji shi) administered by Dezhou are:

- Laoling (乐陵市)
- Yucheng (禹城市)

Counties

Counties (县 xian) administered by Dezhou are:

- Pingyuan (平原县)
- Xiajin (夏津县)
- Wucheng (武城县)
- Qihe (齐河县)
- Linyi (临邑县)
- Ningjin (宁津县)
- Qingyun (庆云县)

Development zones

- Tianqu New District (TianQuXin-Qu, 天衢新区), which is the former:
  - Dezhou Economic Development District (德州经济开发区)
  - Dezhou Yunhe Economic Development District (德州运河经济开发区)

Map
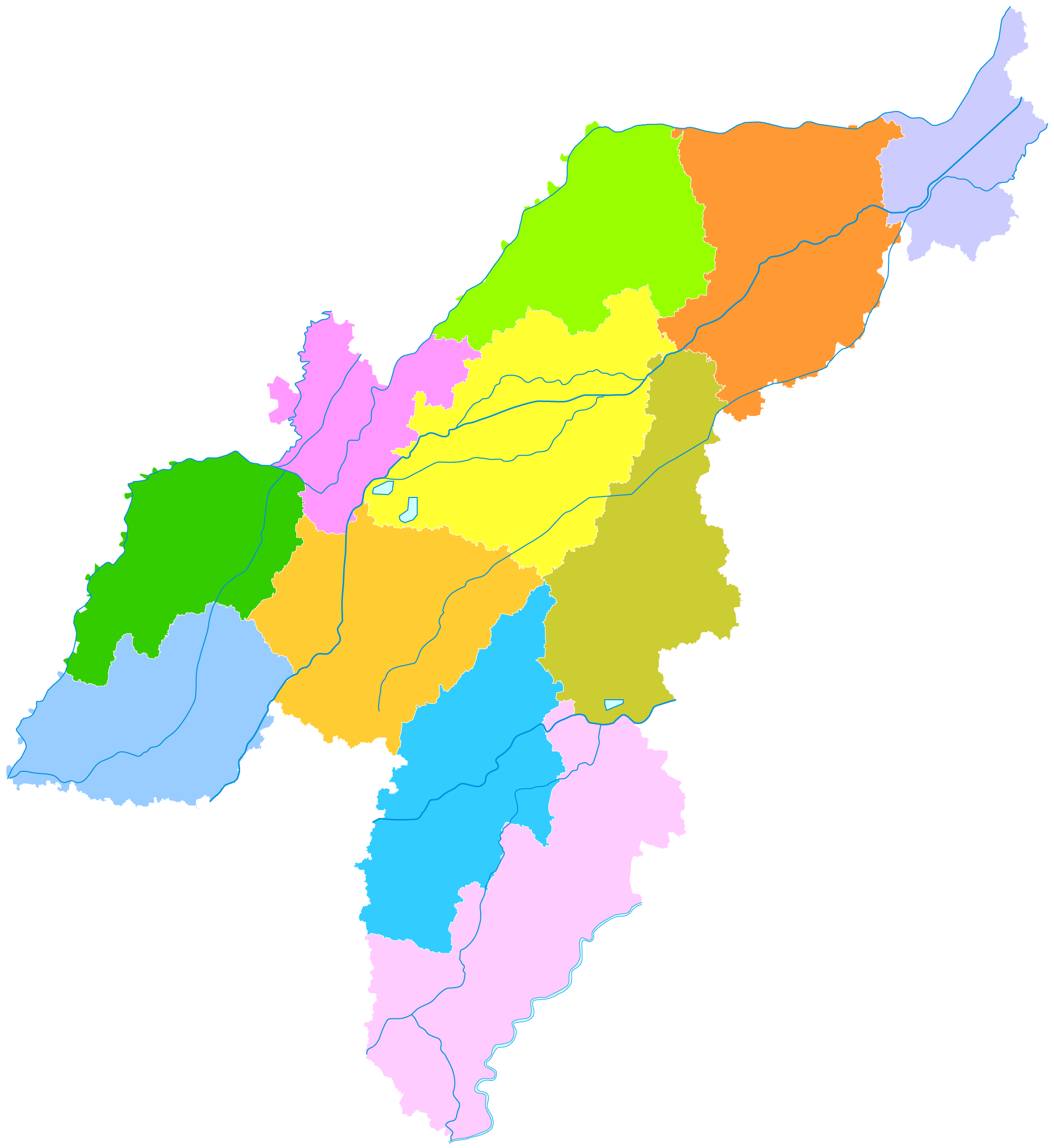

== Climate ==
Climate data for Dezhou, elevation 25 m (82 ft), (1991–2020 normals, extremes 1981–2010)
Month	Jan	Feb	Mar	Apr	May	Jun	Jul	Aug	Sep	Oct	Nov	Dec	Year
Record high °C (°F)	17.1 (62.8)	23.1 (73.6)	30.2 (86.4)	33.7 (92.7)	39.0 (102.2)	41.1 (106.0)	42.6 (108.7)	37.0 (98.6)	37.0 (98.6)	32.3 (90.1)	26.6 (79.9)	17.7 (63.9)	42.6 (108.7)
Mean daily maximum °C (°F)	3.5 (38.3)	7.3 (45.1)	15.1 (59.2)	21.3 (70.3)	27.5 (81.5)	32.1 (89.8)	32.4 (90.3)	30.8 (87.4)	27.2 (81.0)	21.4 (70.5)	12.5 (54.5)	5.3 (41.5)	19.7 (67.5)
Daily mean °C (°F)	−1.3 (29.7)	2.1 (35.8)	9.2 (48.6)	15.3 (59.5)	21.8 (71.2)	26.4 (79.5)	27.7 (81.9)	26.3 (79.3)	21.8 (71.2)	15.6 (60.1)	7.3 (45.1)	0.5 (32.9)	14.4 (57.9)
Mean daily minimum °C (°F)	−5.0 (23.0)	−1.9 (28.6)	4.3 (39.7)	10.1 (50.2)	16.6 (61.9)	21.3 (70.3)	23.8 (74.8)	22.7 (72.9)	17.7 (63.9)	11.1 (52.0)	3.3 (37.9)	−3.2 (26.2)	10.1 (50.1)
Record low °C (°F)	−17.4 (0.7)	−12.6 (9.3)	−6.9 (19.6)	−0.7 (30.7)	5.8 (42.4)	10.5 (50.9)	17.2 (63.0)	14.5 (58.1)	5.8 (42.4)	−1.4 (29.5)	−10.7 (12.7)	−16.1 (3.0)	−17.4 (0.7)
Average precipitation mm (inches)	2.9 (0.11)	8.6 (0.34)	8.0 (0.31)	25.0 (0.98)	39.7 (1.56)	70.3 (2.77)	152.0 (5.98)	137.6 (5.42)	45.4 (1.79)	28.7 (1.13)	15.5 (0.61)	3.2 (0.13)	536.9 (21.13)
Average precipitation days (≥ 0.1 mm)	1.6	2.8	2.4	4.9	6.0	7.5	10.9	9.4	5.7	5.0	3.8	2.1	62.1
Average snowy days	3.1	3.0	1.0	0.2	0	0	0	0	0	0	1.1	2.4	10.8
Average relative humidity (%)	57	54	50	55	58	60	75	78	70	64	64	61	62
Mean monthly sunshine hours	155.4	161.6	218.2	239.8	267.9	236.7	197.6	200.0	199.1	193.7	156.9	150.2	2,377.1
Percentage possible sunshine	50	52	59	61	61	54	44	48	54	56	52	51	54
Source: China Meteorological Administration

== Transport ==
=== Historical ===
The Yellow River and the Grand Canal both run through Dezhou, making it an important hub for cargo transit since ancient times. In antiquity, it was described as "Junction of Nine Arteries" (九达天衢) and "Portal of the Capital" (神京门户).

=== Modern era ===
Dezhou is on the Shijiazhuang-Dezhou railway, the Shijiazhuang–Ji'nan railway, the Beijing–Shanghai railway, and the Beijing–Shanghai high-speed railway. In addition, a small single-track railway connects Dezhou with Dongying.

Dezhou serves as a key stop on the Beijing-Shanghai High-speed Railway, providing exceptional transport links that enable travelers to make same-day return trips to both Beijing and Shanghai.

The main expressway passing Dezhou is the G3 Beijing–Taipei Expressway, running north–south from it. Other highways include the Dezhou–Shanghai Expressway, National Highway 104, and National Highway 105, offering connections in other directions.

G2 Beijing–Shanghai Expressway passes through the Laoling urban area and Linyi, making Laoling a sub-center of Dezhou.

== Tourism ==
Dezhou's biggest historical attraction is the tomb of Sultan Paduka Pahala of Sulu (Philippines), who died in Dezhou on his return journey from a visit to the Yongle Emperor in 1417. The tomb is well preserved and has been declared a national heritage site. Descendants of the sultan's Muslim followers still live in Dezhou today, and are classified as the Hui minority.

One of Dezhou's county Lingxian used to be a big county in China in history, when it was called Pingyuan County. Now part of the ancient city wall of Tang Dynasty still exists in the south of the region. Before the Three Kingdoms formed, one of the three emperors Liu Bei used to be the chief of the county, together with his fellows Guan Yu and Zhang Fei. In addition, it is the hometown of Dongfang Shuo, the most well-known adviser during the reign of Emperor Wu of Han. In the Tang Dynasty, a major figure of Chinese calligraphy, Yan Zhenqing, once took office as the administrator of the county. Today, a memorial hall for the two historic figures is built in the People's Park of Lingxian, where a lot of materials of Dongfang Shuo and stone inscriptions of Yan Zhenqing are preserved.

For tourist attractions, there is also a famous temple in Qingyun County. It is called Haidao Jinshan Temple, which is one of the biggest centers of Buddhism in Northern China. The most attractive scene is the underground aisle where the portrait of the hell is presented using high technology.

As the filming location for first-line film and television works, Laoling Film Studio has become a new tourist destination after opening to the public, providing an interactive experience that allows tourists to experience the real scenes of film and television dramas.

Quancheng Oulebao is a large theme park and animal world, while Laoling Shiguang is a cultural park converted from an old factory in the last century, attracting many local and foreign tourists.

Located at a major transportation crossroads, Dezhou has abundant railway transit and transfer passengers due to several railway lines passing through the city. Its connections with the Beijing–Shanghai Railway and Beijing–Shanghai High-Speed Railway attract significant passenger flows. The Beijing–Shanghai and Beijing–Taipei Expressways also bring large numbers of highway travelers through Dezhou.

== Industry ==
A new industrial zone hailed as the "Solar Valley" is being built for experimenting with clean-energy urban projects and massive use of household utilities such as solar-powered water-heaters. The Washington Post describes Dezhou's Solar Valley as the "clean-tech version of Silicon Valley".

Nowadays one of the biggest and most famous industries in Dezhou is solar energy industry, with two main corporations included—Himin Group (皇明集团) and its partner Ecco Solar Group (亿家能集团). Dezhou increased its international reputation when it was selected to follow previous hosts, Daegu, South Korea (2004), Oxford, UK (2006) and Adelaide, Australia (2008) as host of the 2010 International Solar City Congress. Himin Group has developed into the world's largest solar water heater manufacturer and is also discovering new areas such as photoelectricity.

Greenpeace China cited Dezhou in May 2009 as an example of how renewable energy can become a more common reality throughout the world.

Dezhou houses the world's largest solar-powered office building, covering around 75,000 square meters. Dezhou also has semiconductor and sports equipment manufacturing industries. China's largest seasoning production base is located in Laoling, Dezhou.

The sports industry is an emerging industry in Dezhou, mainly focusing on the production of fitness equipment and sports equipment, competitive bicycle manufacturing, etc., mainly led by Laoling and Ningjin.

Dezhou is also rapidly developing its semiconductor industry and has introduced many advanced semiconductor companies.

Dezhou is home to more than 10 A-share listed companies, with over half of them located in county-level regions. These listed enterprises span various industries, particularly concentrated in the industrial sector, including several manufacturing companies listed on the A-share main board.

Dezhou's 12 recognized export brand enterprises are distributed across key industrial hubs including Decheng District, Yucheng, Laoling, Qihe, Lingcheng, Pingyuan, and Ningjin, reflecting the city's manufacturing base in equipment, chemicals, food processing, textiles, and new materials while strengthening its transition from product exports to globally competitive brands.

== Culture ==
As a city along the Grand Canal since ancient times, Dezhou's culture has developed alongside canal shipping and railways. As a traditional agricultural region, many of Dezhou's delicacies are deeply connected to the history and legends of the Qing Dynasty, such as the famous Dezhou Braised Chicken, Golden Silk Jujubes, and Daliu Noodles.

Dezhou Braised Chicken is the most famous dish in Dezhou.

Golden Silk Jujubes are the most famous agricultural product in Laoling, Dezhou, and an important carrier of agricultural culture.

== Education ==
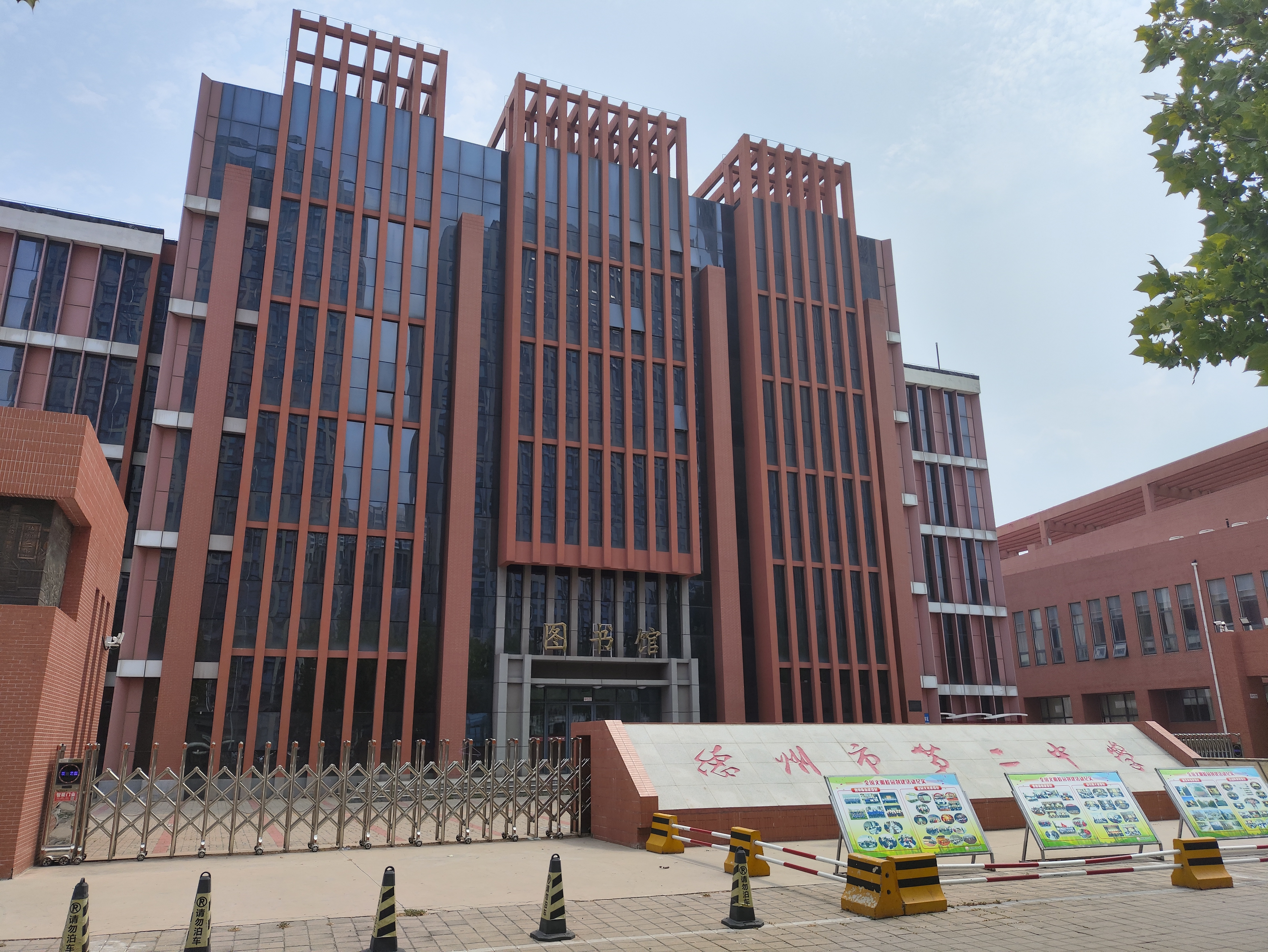
Dezhou No.2 Middle school High school

- Dezhou University: a comprehensive university which was approved by the National Education Committee in March 2000. It is the aggregation of Dezhou Teachers’ College, Dezhou Education College and Evening College Municipality, which has a more than 30-year history. It currently offers postgraduate education.
- Shandong Huayu Institute of Technology: a private science and engineering university offers 4-year undergraduate majors.
- Dezhou Vocational and Technical College: a public vocational college in Dezhou, offers 3-year vocational majors.
- Technological Vocational College of Dezhou: a private vocational college in Dezhou.
- Dezhou Engineering Vocational College: a private polytechnic vocational college in Dezhou.
- Shandong Vocational College of Culture and Arts: a public college for arts in Qihe county.
- Dezhou Vocational College of Intelligent Technology: a public poly college started in 2025.

== Notable people ==
- Dongfang Shuo (154 to 93 BC, The Western Han Dynasty), Writer and poet
- Yan Zhenqing (709 to 784, The Tang Dynasty), Calligrapher, poet
- Ma Dehua (1945), actor, best known for his role as Zhu Bajie in the television series Journey to the West
- He Rong (1962), Minister of Justice
- Han Hong (1971), Singer, songwriter, music producer, director
- Zhang Yuqi (1986), Chinese actress
- Ma Tianyu (1986), Chinese actor

== Miscellaneous ==
- Dezhou is well known for its braised chicken and watermelon.
- The name of Dezhou is the same as the abbreviation of the Chinese name for the U.S. state of Texas.
- Pingyuan, Dezhou is the foundation place of Yihetuan (Boxer Rebellion) against the Eight Power Allied Force during the 1900s.
