= Qiaozhuang =

Qiaozhuang (Chinese: 乔庄; pinyin: Qiáozhuāng) may refer to these towns in China:

- Qiaozhuang, Shandong, in Boxing County, Shandong
- Qiaozhuang, Sichuan, in Qingchuan County, Sichuan
