= Zhuangyuan Subdistrict =

Zhuangyuan Subdistrict may refer to:

- Zhuangyuan Subdistrict, Qixia, Shandong, China
- Zhuangyuan Subdistrict, Wenzhou, Zhejiang, China

== See also ==
- Zhuangyuan, top finisher of the Chinese imperial examination
