= Duanbolan =

Duanbolan 段泊岚镇
- Town
- Location in Shandong Duanbolan (China)
- Coordinates: 36°32′12″N 120°21′32″E
- Country: People's Republic of China
- Province: Shandong
- Prefecture-level city: Qingdao
- District: Jimo District
- Time zone: UTC+8 (China Standard)

Duanbolan (Chinese: 段泊岚; pinyin: Duànbólán) is a town in Jimo District, Qingdao, Shandong province, China. As of 2020, it has 69 villages under its administration:

- Duanbolan First Village (段泊岚一村)
- Duanbolan Second Village (段泊岚二村)
- Duanbolan Third Village (段泊岚三村)
- Duanbolan Fourth Village (段泊岚四村)
- Sunjiahouzhai Village (孙家后寨村)
- Jiangjiazhuang Village (姜家庄村)
- Maojialing First Village (毛家岭一村)
- Maojialing Second Village (毛家岭二村)
- Maojialing Third Village (毛家岭三村)
- Maojialing Fourth Village (毛家岭四村)
- Shihuiyao Village (石灰窑村)
- Chenggezhuang First Village (程戈庄一村)
- Chenggezhuang Second Village (程戈庄二村)
- Chenggezhuang Third Village (程戈庄三村)
- Liujiayingli Village (刘家营里村)
- Lilin Village (栗林村)
- Houbu Village (后埠村)
- Guanlubu Village (官路埠村)
- Huaishugou Village (槐树沟村)
- Yejiazhaike Village (叶家宅科村)
- Ligezhuang Village (李哥庄村)
- Dongwagezhuang First Village (东瓦戈庄一村)
- Dongwagezhuang Second Village (东瓦戈庄二村)
- Dongwagezhuang Third Village (东瓦戈庄三村)
- Xiwagezhuang Village (西瓦戈庄村)
- Waqianzhuang Village (瓦前庄村)
- Menggezhuang Village (孟戈庄村)
- Lanshang Village (岚上村)
- Maobu Village (毛埠村)
- Sanjia Village (三甲村)
- Shijiajie Village (史家街村)
- Dongdayuzhuang Village (东大于庄村)
- Xidayuzhuang Village (西大于庄村)
- Wangxinzhuang Village (王新庄村)
- Lanbu Village (岚埠村)
- Maogezhuang Village (毛戈庄村)
- Guojiatuan Village (郭家疃村)
- Linghou Village (岭后村)
- Lanxitou Village (岚西头村)
- Dongzhangjiabu Village (东章嘉埠村)
- Xizhangjiabu Village (西章嘉埠村)
- Jiangjiapo Village (姜家坡村)
- Liujiazhuang First Village (刘家庄一村)
- Liujiazhuang Second Village (刘家庄二村)
- Liujiazhuang Third Village (刘家庄三村)
- Liujiazhuang Fourth Village (刘家庄四村)
- Liujiazhuang Fifth Village (刘家庄五村)
- Qiaogezhuang Village (乔戈庄村)
- Chenggezhuang Village (程戈庄村)
- Zhaogezhuang Village (赵戈庄村)
- Budong Village (埠东村)
- Gaojialing Village (高家岭村)
- Jiajiahoutuan Village (贾家后疃村)
- Chengjiazhuang Village (程家庄村)
- Sunjiatun Village (孙家屯村)
- Zhangguanzhuang Village (张官庄村)
- Xijianzhuang Village (西尖庄村)
- Dongjianzhuang Village (东尖庄村)
- Dalügezhuang First Village (大吕戈庄一村)
- Dalügezhuang Second Village (大吕戈庄二村)
- Dalügezhuang Third Village (大吕戈庄三村)
- Xiaolügezhuang Village (小吕戈庄村)
- Dahubu Village (大胡埠村)
- Tiangongyuan Village (天宫院村)
- Yuanjiazhuang Village (袁家庄村)
- Fanggezhuang Village (方戈庄村)
- Maigezhuang Village (麦戈庄村)
- Qigezhuang Village (起戈庄村)
- Xuejiaquanzhuang Village (薛家泉庄村)

== See also ==
- List of township-level divisions of Shandong
