= Yifengdian =

Yifengdian 移风店镇
- Town
- Location in Shandong Yifengdian (China)
- Coordinates: 36°35′10″N 120°11′56″E
- Country: People's Republic of China
- Province: Shandong
- Prefecture-level city: Qingdao
- District: Jimo District
- Time zone: UTC+8 (China Standard)

Yifengdian (Chinese: 移风店; pinyin: Yífēngdiàn) is a town in Jimo District, Qingdao, Shandong province, China. As of 2020, it has 99 villages under its administration:

- Yifengdian Village
- Qiandian Village (前店村)
- Hougucheng Village (后古城村)
- Linjiatuan Village (林家疃村)
- Houdian Village (后店村)
- Diqian Village (堤前村)
- Majunzhai Village (马军寨村)
- Maogongbo Village (毛公泊村)
- Guanzhuang Village (官庄村)
- Shabu Village (沙埠村)
- Huanggezhuang Village (黄戈庄村)
- Sanwanzhuang Village (三湾庄村)
- Dayuan Village (大院村)
- Jiaxi Village (家西村)
- Qiangucheng Village (前古城村)
- Nanbu Village (南埠村)
- Daba Village (大坝村)
- Xiaoba Village (小坝村)
- Lijiazhuang Village (李家庄村)
- Dazhuang Village (大庄村)
- Hanjiazhuang Village (韩家庄村)
- Dongqiao Village (东桥村)
- Xiqiao Village (西桥村)
- Shangbo Village (上泊村)
- Gouxi Village (沟西村)
- Hejiatun Village (黑家屯村)
- Moujia Village (牟家村)
- Sunjia Village (孙家村)
- Zhenjiazhuang Village (甄家庄村)
- Diandong Village (店东村)
- Malongtuan Village (马龙疃村)
- Wali Village (洼里村)
- Yuanshang Village (院上村)
- Huangjiazhuang Village (黄家庄村)
- Taipingzhuang Village (太平庄村)
- Jiaojiazhuang Village (矫家庄村)
- Nü'er Village (女儿村)
- Fujia Village (傅家村)
- Xujiagou Village (徐家沟村)
- Dongzhujiazhuang Village (东朱家庄村)
- Wangjia Village (王家村)
- Zhangjia Village (张家村)
- Zhaojia Village (赵家村)
- Hebeizhuang Village (河北庄村)
- Renjiazhuang Village (任家庄村)
- Xitaizhizhuang Village (西太祉庄村)
- Dongtaizhizhuang Village (东太祉庄村)
- Dongfengtai Village (东丰台村)
- Xifengtai Village (西丰台村)
- Zhujiazhuang Village (朱家庄村)
- Gaojizhuang Village (高吉庄村)
- Lengjiabu Village (冷家埠村)
- Daotou Village (道头村)
- Dongheliuzhuang Village (东河流庄村)
- Xiheliuzhuang Village (西河流庄村)
- Sanli Village (三里村)
- Xiaolanjiazhuang Village (肖兰家庄村)
- Xinjiatie Village (辛家帖村)
- Caojiatun Village (曹家屯村)
- Huangwa Village (荒洼村)
- Dalanjiazhuang Village (大兰家庄村)
- Wujiatun Village (吴家屯村)
- Nanxinzhuang Village (南辛庄村)
- Beixinzhuang Village (北辛庄村)
- Fangzhuang Village (坊庄村)
- Qijixinan Village (七级西南村)
- Qijidongbei Village (七级东北村)
- Qijixibei Village (七级西北村)
- Qijidongnan Village (七级东南村)
- Zhanglizhuang Village (张李庄村)
- Xiqijidong Village (西七级东村)
- Xiqijixi Village (西七级西村)
- Houlügezhuang Village (后吕戈庄村)
- Qianlügezhuang Village (前吕戈庄村)
- Beichahe Village (北岔河村)
- Zhongchahe Village (中岔河村)
- Xilongwantou Village (西龙湾头村)
- Kangjiazhuang Village (康家庄村)
- Beizhangyuan Village (北张院村)
- Zhongzhangyuan Village (中张院村)
- Nanzhangyuan Village (南张院村)
- Maozibu Village (毛子埠村)
- Beizhu Village (北住村)
- Da'ougezhuang Village (大欧戈庄村)
- Xiao'ougezhuang Village (小欧戈庄村)
- Qingzhongbu Village (青中埠村)
- Zhongjianbu Village (中间埠村)
- Zhangwangzhuang Village (张王庄村)
- Quanzhuang Village (泉庄村)
- Xiejiatun Village (谢家屯村)
- Balizhuang Village (八里庄村)
- Sangjiabu Village (桑家埠村)
- Fengxiangzhuang Village (丰享庄村)
- Tuanwanxinan Village (湍湾西南村)
- Tuanwanxibei Village (湍湾西北村)
- Tuanwandajie Village (湍湾大街村)
- Tuanwandongjie Village (湍湾东街村)
- Tuanwanshipeng Village (湍湾石硼村)
- Qijiabu Village (綦家埠村)

== See also ==
- List of township-level divisions of Shandong
