= Daxin Subdistrict =

Daxin Subdistrict 大信街道
- Subdistrict
- Location in Shandong Daxin Subdistrict (China)
- Coordinates: 36°22′56″N 120°19′41″E
- Country: China
- Province: Shandong
- Prefecture: Qingdao
- District: Jimo District
- Time zone: UTC+8 (China Standard Time)

Daxin Subdistrict (Chinese: 大信街道; pinyin: Dàxìn Jiēdào) is a township-level division situated in Jimo District of Qingdao, Shandong, China. As of 2020, it administers Qingdao Iron & Steel Group Farm Residential Quarter (青岛钢铁集团农场生活区) and the following 78 villages:

- Daxin Village
- Qiaojia Village (乔家村)
- Guanlu Village (官路村)
- Gongjia Village (宫家村)
- Xinsheng Village (新胜村)
- Lijiahanwa Village (李家韩洼村)
- Hanjiahanwa Village (韩家韩洼村)
- Chenjia Village (陈家村)
- Zhonggezhuang Village (仲戈庄村)
- Xiaodingjia Village (小丁家村)
- Xiaojinjia Village (小金家村)
- Dajinjia Village (大金家村)
- Haojiazhuang Village (郝家庄村)
- Nianzitou Village (碾子头村)
- Xiaoxin Village (小信村)
- Xinfuzhuang Village (新付庄村)
- Duijiubo Village (碓臼泊村)
- Shigubu Village (石崮埠村)
- Gaojiawa Village (高家洼村)
- Dafanjia Village (大范家村)
- Xiaofanjia Village (小范家村)
- Nanwangjiazhuang Village (南王家庄村)
- Sijiatuan First Village (司家疃一村)
- Sijiatuan Second Village (司家疃二村)
- Sijiatuan Third Village (司家疃三村)
- Xinhuayuan Village (新花园村)
- Zhaojiatuan Village (赵家疃村)
- Lijiatuan Village (李家疃村)
- Nanzhaijiatuan Village (南翟家疃村)
- Beizhaijiatuan Village (北翟家疃村)
- Beiwangjiazhuang Village (北王家庄村)
- Changjiajie Village (常家街村)
- Puxi Village (普西村)
- Pudong Village (普东村)
- Wangjiajie Village (王家街村)
- Zhaojiajie Village (赵家街村)
- Zhongjiajie Village (钟家街村)
- Renjiatun Village (任家屯村)
- Taohang Village (桃杭村)
- Fujiatun Village (付家屯村)
- Liangjiahuang Village (梁家荒村)
- Houjiatun Village (后家屯村)
- Honggou Village (洪沟村)
- Dongsuntangzhuang Village (东孙唐庄村)
- Nansuntangzhuang Village (南孙唐庄村)
- Xisuntangzhuang Village (西孙唐庄村)
- Gebu Village (葛埠村)
- Tanglitun Village (唐李屯村)
- Qujiatun Village (曲家屯村)
- Wangjiatuan Village (王家疃村)
- Faxuanqiao Village (发玄桥村)
- Zhanjiatun Village (展家屯村)
- Panjiatun Village (潘家屯村)
- Caochang Village (草场村)
- Babaozhuang Village (八宝庄村)
- Yangjiazhuang Village (杨家庄村)
- Yuanjiatun Village (袁家屯村)
- Taitou First Village (抬头一村)
- Taitou Second Village (抬头二村)
- Taitou Third Village (抬头三村)
- Taitou Fourth Village (抬头四村)
- Wangjia Village (王家村)
- Changzhi Village (长直村)
- Yinjia Village (尹家村)
- Zhaojia Village (赵家村)
- Songjiazhuang Village (宋家庄村)
- Jiangjia Village (姜家村)
- Yangjia Village (杨家村)
- Xiaodian Village (小店村)
- Zhanggezhuangyili Village (张戈庄一里村)
- Zhanggezhuangsanli Village (张戈庄三里村)
- Zhanggezhuangsili Village (张戈庄四里村)
- Zhanggezhuangliuli Village (张戈庄六里村)
- Xiaofangezhuang Village (小范戈庄村)
- Daokoudong Village (道口东村)
- Fandong Village (范东村)
- Fanxi Village (范西村)
- Qianjin Village (前进村)

== See also ==
- List of township-level divisions of Shandong
