= Lancun Subdistrict =

Lancun Subdistrict 蓝村街道
- Subdistrict
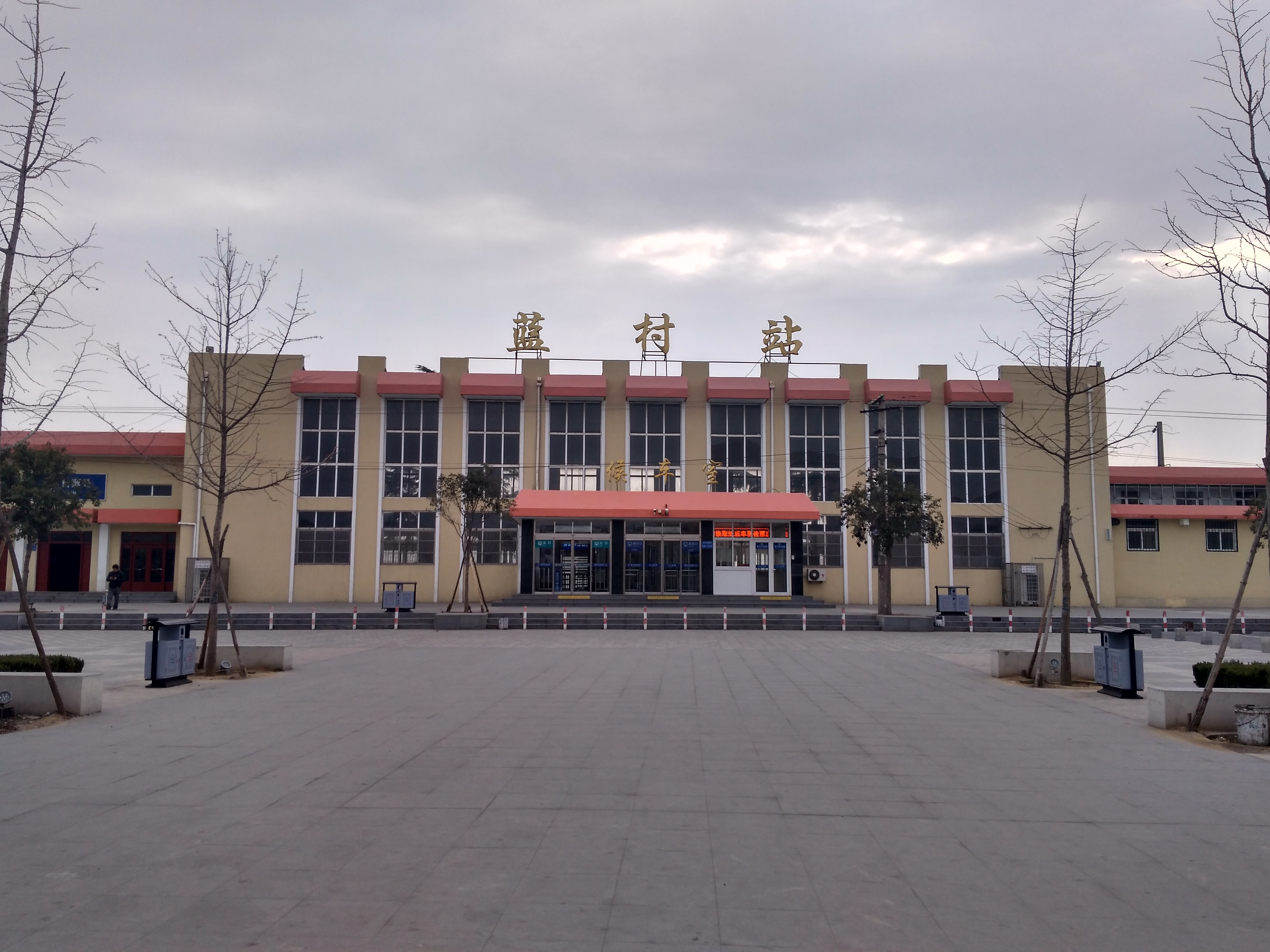
- Lancun Railway Station, the starting point of the Lancun–Yantai railway

- Location in Shandong Lancun Subdistrict (China)
- Coordinates: 36°24′30″N 120°11′7″E
- Country: People's Republic of China
- Province: Shandong
- Prefecture-level city: Qingdao
- District: Jimo District
- Time zone: UTC+8 (China Standard)

Lancun Subdistrict (Chinese: 蓝村街道; pinyin: láncūn jiēdào) is a subdistrict in Jimo District, Qingdao, Shandong province, China. As of 2020, it has six neighborhoods or communities and 52 villages under its administration:

Neighborhoods

- Jiangjiawuzi (姜家屋子)
- Xinjiawuzi (辛家屋子)
- Xinli (新立)
- Qiaoxitou (桥西头)
- Yanghui Road Community (阳辉路社区)
- Zhenghe Road Community (政和路社区)

Villages

- Sanli Village (三里村)
- Sili Village (四里村)
- Yili Village (一里村)
- Erli Village (二里村)
- Guojiazhuang Village (郭家庄村)
- Guojiawuzi Village (郭家屋子村)
- Daoxiang Village (稻香村)
- Guajiawuzi Village (管家屋子村)
- Wangjiawuzi Village (王家屋子村)
- Xiaoguanzhuang Village (小官庄村)
- Daguanzhuang Village (大官庄村)
- Lujiabu Village (鲁家埠村)
- Bozi Village (泊子村)
- Houbaita Village (后白塔村)
- Qianbaita Village (前白塔村)
- Jiagezhuang Village (贾戈庄村)
- Chenghou Village (城后村)
- Gucheng Village (古城村)
- Liuli Village (六里村)
- Wuli Village (五里村)
- Nanquan Village (南泉村)
- Beiquan Village (北泉村)
- Quandong Village (泉东村)
- Qiaogezhuang Village (乔戈庄村)
- Qianbutou Village (前埠头村)
- Houbutou Village (后埠头村)
- Luanbu Village (栾埠村)
- Zhujiaguanzhuang Village (朱家官庄村)
- Dabuhou Village (大埠后村)
- Xiaobuhou Village (小埠后村)
- Dongshiyuzhuang Village (东时于庄村)
- Xishiyuzhuang Village (西时于庄村)
- Wangyanzhuangnan Village (王演庄南村)
- Wangyanzhuangbei Village (王演庄北村)
- Wangyanzhuangdong Village (王演庄东村)
- Wangjiaxiaoqiao Village (王家小桥村)
- Nanhaojiatun Village (南郝家屯村)
- Nuochengwang Village (挪城王村)
- Nuochengliu Village (挪城刘村)
- Nuochengsong Village (挪城宋村)
- Nuochengfan Village (挪城范村)
- Nuochenghenan Village (挪城河南村)
- Beihaojiatun Village (北郝家屯村)
- Xincheng Village (新城村)
- Daijiazhuang Village (戴家庄村)
- Fangoutuan Village (范沟疃村)
- Majiatun Village (马家屯村)
- Zhaojiatun Village (赵家屯村)
- Qingyutun Village (庆余屯村)
- Wangjiaxinzhuang Village (王家辛庄村)
- Cuijiawuzi Village (崔家屋子村)
- Wushan Village (午山村)

== See also ==
- List of township-level divisions of Shandong
