= Guoli =

Guoli may refer to these towns in China:

- Guoli, Zoucheng (郭里), in Zoucheng, Shandong
- Guoli, Huantai County (果里), in Huantai County, Shandong

== See also ==
- Guo Li (born 1993), Chinese synchronised swimmer
