= Wenquan Subdistrict, Qingdao =

Wenquan 温泉镇
- Town
- Location in Qingdao Wenquan (Shandong) Wenquan (China)
- Coordinates: 36°27′05″N 120°39′30″E
- Country: People's Republic of China
- Province: Shandong
- Sub-provincial city: Qingdao
- County-level city: Jimo
- Elevation: 24 m (79 ft)
- Time zone: UTC+8 (China Standard)
- Postal code: 266207
- Area code: 0532

Wenquan (simplified Chinese: 温泉; traditional Chinese: 溫泉; pinyin: Wēnquán; lit. 'hot springs') is a town in Jimo City in eastern Shandong province, China, located about 20 km (12 mi) east of Jimo's city centre and more than twice that distance northeast of Qingdao. As of 2011, it has 28 villages under its administration.

== See also ==
- List of township-level divisions of Shandong
