= Yanya (disambiguation) =

Yanya is the Turkish language name for Ioannina.

Yanya may also refer to:

- Yanya, Shandong, a town in Yiyuan County, Shandong, China
- Yanya Subdistrict (雁崖街道), a subdistrict in Yungang District, Datong, Shanxi, China
- Nilüfer Yanya (born 1996), British rock composer, singer and guitarist
