= Shuangmiao, Shandong =

Shuangmiao 双庙镇
- Town
- Location in Shandong Shuangmiao (China)
- Coordinates: 36°58′43″N 115°53′33″E
- Country: People's Republic of China
- Province: Shandong
- Prefecture-level city: Dezhou
- County: Xiajin
- Elevation: 35 m (115 ft)
- Time zone: UTC+8 (China Standard)
- Area code: 0534

Shuangmiao (simplified Chinese: 双庙; traditional Chinese: 雙廟; pinyin: Shuāngmiào; lit. 'double temple') is a town in Xiajin County in northwestern Shandong province, China, located about 10 kilometres (6.2 mi) west-northwest of the county seat and 8 km (5.0 mi) east of the border with Hebei. As of 2011, it has five residential communities (社区) and nine villages under its administration.

== See also ==
- List of township-level divisions of Shandong
