= Xiangyang Subdistrict, Yantai =

Xiangyang Subdistrict 向阳街道
- Subdistrict
- Location in Shandong
- Coordinates: 37°32′0″N 121°23′41″E
- Country: People's Republic of China
- Province: Shandong
- Prefecture-level city: Yantai
- District: Zhifu District
- Time zone: UTC+8 (China Standard)

Xiangyang Subdistrict (Chinese: 向阳街道; pinyin: Xiàngyáng Jiēdào) is a subdistrict in Zhifu District, Yantai, Shandong, China. As of 2018, it has eight residential communities under its administration.

== See also ==
- List of township-level divisions of Shandong
