= Wangcun, Zibo =

Wangcun 王村镇
- Town
- Location in Shandong
- Coordinates: 36°40′51″N 117°43′51″E
- Country: People's Republic of China
- Province: Shandong
- Prefecture-level city: Zibo
- District: Zhoucun
- Elevation: 146 m (479 ft)
- Time zone: UTC+8 (China Standard)
- Area code: 0533

Wangcun (Chinese: 王村; pinyin: Wángcūn) is a town in Zhoucun District, Zibo, in west-central Shandong province, China, located 18 kilometres (11 mi) east-southeast of Zhangqiu and more than 30 km (19 mi) southwest of downtown Zibo. As of 2011, it has 41 villages under its administration. China National Highway 309 passes near the town.

== See also ==
- List of township-level divisions of Shandong
