= Xiajin County =

Xiajin County 夏津县 Siatsing
- County
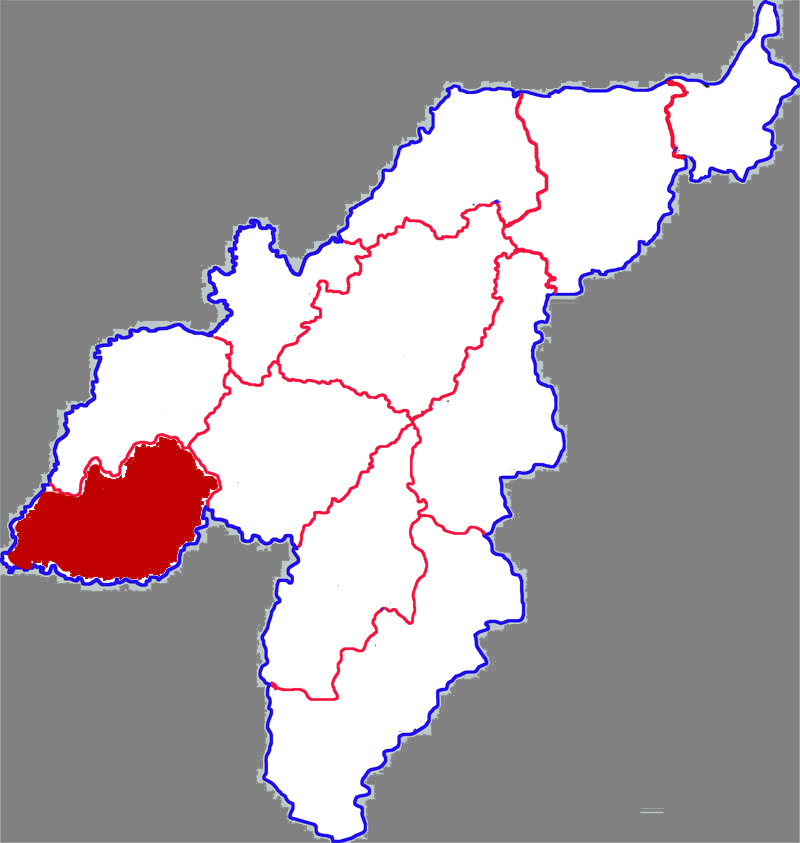
- Xiajin in Dezhou

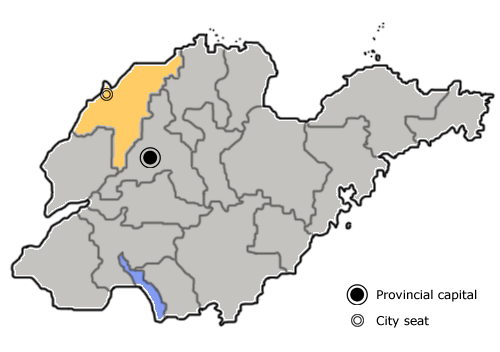
- Dezhou in Shandong
- Coordinates: 36°56′54″N 116°00′06″E
- Country: People's Republic of China
- Province: Shandong
- Prefecture-level city: Dezhou

Area
  - Total: 882 km^{2} (341 sq mi)

Population (2019)
  - Total: 512,300
  - Density: 581/km^{2} (1,500/sq mi)
- Time zone: UTC+8 (China Standard)
- Postal code: 253200

Xiajin County (Chinese: 夏津县; pinyin: Xiàjīn Xiàn) is a county in the northwest of Shandong Province, China, bordering Hebei to the west. It is the westernmost county-level division of the prefecture-level city of Dezhou. Its total size is 882 km^{2} (341 sq mi), and its population is roughly 500,000. Its economy is mostly agricultural, including cotton, wheat, and corn.

== Administrative divisions ==
As of 2012, this County is divided to 2 subdistricts, 10 towns and 2 townships.

Subdistricts

- Yincheng Subdistrict (银城街道)
- Beicheng Subdistrict (北城街道)

Towns

- Nancheng, Xiajin (南城镇)
- Suliuzhuang (苏留庄镇)
- Xinshengdian (新盛店镇)
- Leiji (雷集镇)
- Zhengbaotun (郑保屯镇)
- Baimahu (白马湖镇)
- Dongliguantun (东李官屯镇)
- Songlou (宋楼镇)
- Xiangzhaozhuang (香赵庄镇)
- Shuangmiao (双庙镇)

Townships

- Dukouyi Township (渡口驿乡)
- Tianzhuang Township (田庄乡)

== Climate ==
Climate data for Xiajin, elevation 28 m (92 ft), (1991–2020 normals, extremes 1991–present)
Month	Jan	Feb	Mar	Apr	May	Jun	Jul	Aug	Sep	Oct	Nov	Dec	Year
Record high °C (°F)	17.3 (63.1)	23.1 (73.6)	28.8 (83.8)	32.9 (91.2)	39.0 (102.2)	41.3 (106.3)	41.6 (106.9)	37.2 (99.0)	36.4 (97.5)	32.2 (90.0)	27.3 (81.1)	15.5 (59.9)	41.6 (106.9)
Mean daily maximum °C (°F)	3.5 (38.3)	7.7 (45.9)	14.6 (58.3)	21.3 (70.3)	27.1 (80.8)	31.6 (88.9)	31.7 (89.1)	30.1 (86.2)	26.9 (80.4)	21.0 (69.8)	12.3 (54.1)	5.1 (41.2)	19.4 (66.9)
Daily mean °C (°F)	−2.2 (28.0)	1.7 (35.1)	8.4 (47.1)	15.1 (59.2)	21.2 (70.2)	25.7 (78.3)	26.9 (80.4)	25.4 (77.7)	20.9 (69.6)	14.3 (57.7)	6.3 (43.3)	−0.3 (31.5)	13.6 (56.5)
Mean daily minimum °C (°F)	−6.6 (20.1)	−3.0 (26.6)	3.0 (37.4)	9.4 (48.9)	15.5 (59.9)	20.3 (68.5)	22.8 (73.0)	21.5 (70.7)	16.2 (61.2)	9.0 (48.2)	1.4 (34.5)	−4.6 (23.7)	8.7 (47.7)
Record low °C (°F)	−18.6 (−1.5)	−15.6 (3.9)	−9.0 (15.8)	−2.2 (28.0)	5.2 (41.4)	10.4 (50.7)	17.1 (62.8)	12.7 (54.9)	4.2 (39.6)	−3.4 (25.9)	−10.6 (12.9)	−17.0 (1.4)	−18.6 (−1.5)
Average precipitation mm (inches)	3.2 (0.13)	7.9 (0.31)	6.8 (0.27)	28.7 (1.13)	42.6 (1.68)	79.9 (3.15)	142.5 (5.61)	126.0 (4.96)	43.0 (1.69)	31.7 (1.25)	16.0 (0.63)	3.7 (0.15)	532 (20.96)
Average precipitation days (≥ 0.1 mm)	1.6	3.0	2.4	4.8	6.3	7.9	10.9	9.9	6.6	4.9	4.1	2.1	64.5
Average snowy days	3.0	3.4	0.7	0.2	0	0	0	0	0	0	1.0	2.3	10.6
Average relative humidity (%)	63	59	53	56	60	62	79	83	78	70	68	65	66
Mean monthly sunshine hours	146.5	153.7	212.9	236.5	259.5	234.1	204.8	197.9	183.8	184.0	159.0	148.4	2,321.1
Percentage possible sunshine	47	50	57	60	59	53	46	48	50	53	53	50	52
Source: China Meteorological Administration
