= Gaocheng, Shandong =

Gaocheng 高城镇
- Town
- Location in Shandong
- Coordinates: 37°05′49″N 117°57′21″E
- Country: People's Republic of China
- Province: Shandong
- Prefecture-level city: Zibo
- County: Gaoqing County
- Village-level divisions: 42 villages
- Elevation: 13 m (43 ft)
- Time zone: UTC+8 (China Standard)
- Area code: 0533

Gaocheng (Chinese: 高城; pinyin: Gāochéng; lit. 'high city') is a town in Gaoqing County in northern Shandong province, China, located 14 kilometres (8.7 mi) southeast of the county seat. As of 2018, it has 42 villages under its administration.

== See also ==
- List of township-level divisions of Shandong
