= Shengyuan Subdistrict =

Shengyuan Subdistrict 胜园街道
- Subdistrict
- Location in Shandong Shengyuan Subdistrict (China)
- Coordinates: 37°25′12″N 118°27′20″E
- Country: People's Republic of China
- Province: Shandong
- Prefecture-level city: Dongying
- District: Dongying District
- Time zone: UTC+8 (China Standard)

Shengyuan Subdistrict (simplified Chinese: 胜园街道; traditional Chinese: 勝園街道; pinyin: Shèngyuán Jiēdào) is a subdistrict in Dongying District, Dongying, China. As of 2023, it administers seven residential communities: Dongxianhe Community (东现河社区), Nantian Community (南田社区), Keyuan Community (科苑社区), and the following twelve villages:

- Xixianhe Village (西现河村)
- Wanglian Village (王连村)
- Dongsheng Village (东升村)
- Chenjia Village (陈家村)
- Dongshang Village (东商村)
- Zhaojia Village (赵家村)
- Jiangwang Village (姜王村)
- Lujia Village (卢家村)
- Beigao Village (北高村)
- Dingjia Village (丁家村)
- Nanwang Village (南王村)
- Wenjia Village (温家村)

== See also ==
- List of township-level divisions of Shandong
