= Daqiao Subdistrict, Jinan =

Daqiao Subdistrict 大桥街道
- Subdistrict
- Location in Shandong Daqiao Subdistrict (China)
- Coordinates: 36°46′36″N 117°02′05″E
- Country: People's Republic of China
- Province: Shandong
- Sub-provincial city: Jinan
- District: Tianqiao District
- Elevation: 23 m (75 ft)
- Time zone: UTC+8 (China Standard)
- Area code: 0531

Daqiao Subdistrict (simplified Chinese: 大桥街道; traditional Chinese: 大橋街道; pinyin: Dàqiáo Jiēdào) is a subdistrict of Tianqiao District, Jinan, Shandong province, People's Republic of China, located 2 kilometres (1.2 mi) north of the Yellow River. Access to downtown Jinan is provided by China National Highway 104 (G104) via the Jinan Yellow River Bridge, while the other major highways passing in the subdistrict's immediate vicinity are G220 and G308. As of 2018, it has 72 villages under its administration.

== See also ==
- List of township-level divisions of Shandong
