= Shangma Subdistrict, Qingdao =

Shangma Subdistrict 上马街道
- Subdistrict
- Location in Shandong Shangma Subdistrict (China)
- Coordinates: 36.2788°N 120.2365°E
- Country: People's Republic of China
- Province: Shandong
- Prefecture-level city: Qingdao
- District: Chengyang District
- Time zone: UTC+8 (China Standard)

Shangma Subdistrict (simplified Chinese: 上马街道; traditional Chinese: 上馬街道; pinyin: Shàngmǎ Jiēdào) is a subdistrict in Chengyang District, Qingdao, Shandong province, China. As of 2018, it has 26 residential communities under its administration.

== See also ==
- List of township-level divisions of Shandong
