= Yanya, Shandong =

Yanya 燕崖镇
- Town
- Location in Shandong
- Coordinates: 36°06′29″N 118°12′48″E
- Country: People's Republic of China
- Province: Shandong
- Prefecture-level city: Zibo
- County: Yiyuan
- Village-level divisions: 46 villages
- Elevation: 262 m (860 ft)
- Time zone: UTC+8 (China Standard)
- Area code: 0533

Yanya was also the Ottoman Turkish name of Ioannina

Yanya (Chinese: 燕崖; pinyin: Yànyá) is a town in Yiyuan County in the highlands of central Shandong province, China, 9 kilometres (5.6 mi) south of the county seat. As of 2011, it has 46 villages under its administration.

== See also ==
- List of township-level divisions of Shandong
