= Panshidian =

Panshidian 盘石店镇
- Town
- Location in Shandong
- Coordinates: 36°52′31″N 121°16′54″E
- Country: People's Republic of China
- Province: Shandong
- Prefecture-level city: Yantai
- County: Haiyang
- Time zone: UTC+8 (China Standard)

Panshidian (Chinese: 盘石店镇) is a town in Haiyang, Yantai, in eastern Shandong province, China.
