= Tushan, Shandong =

Tushant 土山镇
- Town
- Location in Shandong
- Coordinates: 37°3′33″N 119°40′51″E
- Country: People's Republic of China
- Province: Shandong
- Prefecture-level city: Yantai
- County-level city: Laizhou
- Time zone: UTC+8 (China Standard)

Tushant (Chinese: 土山; pinyin: Tǔshānt) is a town under the administration of Laizhou, Shandong, China. As of 2023, it administers the following 48 villages:

- Tushant Village
- Shanxia Village (山下村)
- Panjia Village (潘家村)
- Tushanyangjia Village (土山杨家村)
- Xisunjia Village (西孙家村)
- Weishan Village (魏山村)
- Tushanlijia Village (土山李家村)
- Tijia Village (提家村)
- Xiaorenjia Village (小任家村)
- Beixujia Village (北徐家村)
- Beiliujia Village (北刘家村)
- Bujia Village (卜家村)
- Zaoliyujia Village (皂里于家村)
- Beisunjia Village (北孙家村)
- Darenjia Village (大任家村)
- Loujia Village (娄家村)
- Qujiazhuang Village (曲家庄村)
- Dongxue Village (东薛村)
- Xixue Village (西薛村)
- Tanjia Village (谭家村)
- Beizhuang Village (北庄村)
- Chenjiadun Village (陈家墩村)
- Dongdeng Village (东登村)
- Xideng Village (西登村)
- Luanjia Village (栾家村)
- Leibumajia Village (雷埠马家村)
- Gujia Village (顾家村)
- Xiwazi Village (西洼子村)
- Haicangyi Village (海沧一村)
- Haicang'er Village (海沧二村)
- Haicangsan Village (海沧三村)
- Haicangliujia Village (海沧刘家村)
- Zhailixujia Village (寨里徐家村)
- Shabuzi Village (沙埠子村)
- Fangyang Village (方杨村)
- Zhongyangjia Village (中杨家村)
- Yangwang Village (杨王村)
- Liulinzi Village (柳林子村)
- Qianyinjia Village (前尹家村)
- Dongdaiguzhuang Village (东代古庄村)
- Xidaiguzhuang Village (西代古庄村)
- Zhuodong Village (浞东村)
- Zhuoxi Village (浞西村)
- Zhuonan Village (浞南村)
- Zhuoli Village (浞李村)
- Taipingzhuang Village (太平庄村)
- Xiaozhuohe Village (小浞河村)
- Jiaojiazhuang Village (焦家庄村)
