= Xujiadian =

Xujiadian 徐家店镇
- Town
- Location in Shandong
- Coordinates: 37°04′53″N 120°59′23″E
- Country: People's Republic of China
- Province: Shandong
- Prefecture-level city: Yantai
- County: Haiyang
- Time zone: UTC+8 (China Standard)

Xujiadian (Chinese: 徐家店镇) is a town in Haiyang, Yantai, in eastern Shandong province, China.
