= Taihe, Shandong =

Taihe 太河镇
- Town
- Location in Shandong
- Coordinates: 36°33′23″N 118°9′27″E
- Country: People's Republic of China
- Province: Shandong
- Prefecture-level city: Zibo
- District: Zichuan District
- Time zone: UTC+8 (China Standard)

Taihe (Chinese: 太河; pinyin: Tàihé) is a town under the administration of Zichuan District, Zibo, Shandong, China. As of 2020, it has 95 villages under its administration:

- Taihe Village
- Dongtonggu Village (东同古村)
- Tongguping Village (同古坪村)
- Houyu Village (后峪村)
- Songjia Village (宋家村)
- Caojia Village (曹家村)
- Guojia Village (郭家村)
- Lijia Village (李家村)
- Heishan Village (黑山村)
- Zhaojiazhuang Village (赵家庄)
- Beimalu Village (北马鹿村)
- Nanmalu Village (南马鹿村)
- Xitonggu Village (西同古村)
- Yangquan Village (杨泉村)
- Linquan Village (林泉村)
- Xin Village (新村)
- Nanxiace Village (南下册村)
- Laoyu Village (老峪村)
- Xiaohougou Village (小后沟村)
- Beixiace Village (北下册村)
- Wangzishan Village (王子山村)
- Dongxiace Village (东下册村)
- Houzhuang Village (厚庄村)
- Dongyu Village (东峪村)
- Dongtaihe Village (东太河村)
- Dongya Village (东崖村)
- Nanyang Village (南阳村)
- Dongnanmou Village (东南牟村)
- Beimou Village (北牟村)
- Xinanmou Village (西南牟村)
- Fangshan Village (方山村)
- Shuangshan Village (双山村)
- Dongyuliang Village (东余粮村)
- Xiyuliang Village (西余粮村)
- Zihe Village (淄河村)
- Mengquan Village (梦泉村)
- Shuangjing Village (双井村)
- Yangjia Village (杨家村)
- Beiqi Village (本齐村)
- Xingfu Village (幸福村)
- Tingziya Village (亭子崖村)
- Yongquan Village (永泉村)
- Nangu Village (南股村)
- Sanghang Village (桑杭村)
- Chenjiajing Village (陈家井村)
- Chiban Village (池板村)
- Xigu Village (西股村)
- Dongpo Village (东坡村)
- Dongdeng Village (东等村)
- Qianhuai Village (前怀村)
- Dongshimen Village (东石门村)
- Maling Village (马陵村)
- Sunjiazhuang Village (孙家庄村)
- Qianxiangyu Village (前香峪村)
- Houxiangyu Village (后香峪村)
- Xishimen Village (西石门村)
- Beizhenhou Village (北镇后村)
- Nanzhenhou Village (南镇后村)
- Chengzi Village (城子村)
- Wantou Village (湾头村)
- Beiyueyin Village (北岳阴村)
- Nanyueyin Village (南岳阴村)
- Jufeng Village (聚峰村)
- Xiaokoutou Village (小口头村)
- Ezhuang Village (峨庄村)
- Shanqiao Village (山桥村)
- Yangjiazhuang Village (杨家庄村)
- Shangqueyu Village (上雀峪村)
- Xiaqueyu Village (下雀峪村)
- Houziyu Village (后紫峪村)
- Qiangou Village (前沟村)
- Hougou Village (后沟村)
- Shamao Village (纱帽村)
- Wangjiazhuang Village (王家庄村)
- Luoquan Village (罗圈村)
- Qinjiazhuang Village (秦家庄村)
- Xiangquan Village (响泉村)
- Tuquan Village (土泉村)
- Liuhua Village (柳花村)
- Xidongyu Village (西东峪村)
- Dongdongyu Village (东东峪村)
- Shangduanshi Village (上端士村)
- Xiaduanshi Village (下端士村)
- Shimudi Village (十亩地村)
- Shangdaoping Village (上岛坪村)
- Xiadaoping Village (下岛坪村)
- Xidaoping Village (西岛坪村)
- Dongpozhuang Village (东坡庄村)
- Baishu Village (柏树村)
- Sunjiaping Village (孙家坪村)
- Shigou Village (石沟村)
- Shi'anyu Village (石安峪村)
- Dongshi Village (东石村)
- Luziyu Village (鲁子峪村)
- Xishi Village (西石村)
