= Zhuangyuan Subdistrict, Qixia =

Zhuangyuan Subdistrict 庄园街道
- Subdistrict
- Location in Shandong
- Coordinates: 37°19′11″N 120°49′36″E
- Country: People's Republic of China
- Province: Shandong
- Prefecture-level city: Yantai
- County-level city: Qixia, Shandong
- Time zone: UTC+8 (China Standard)

Zhuangyuan Subdistrict (Chinese: 庄园街道; pinyin: Zhuāngyuán Jiēdào) is a subdistrict in Qixia, Shandong province, China. As of 2020, it administers the following 45 villages:

- Beiqilizhuang Village (北七里庄村)
- Guzhendu Village (古镇都村)
- Xingjiatuan Village (邢家疃村)
- Haojiatuan Village (郝家疃村)
- Wanggezhuang Village (王格庄村)
- Zhugezhuang Village (主格庄村)
- Xiaoshiling Village (小石岭村)
- Xiejiagou Village (谢家沟村)
- Nanyanzikou Village (南岩子口村)
- Huangkuanglüjia Village (黄夼吕家村)
- Loujia Village (娄家村)
- Jujia Village (鞠家村)
- Beilinjiazhuang Village (北林家庄村)
- Ma'er'ao Village (马耳岙村)
- Hekou Village (河口村)
- Laoshu'ao Village (老树岙村)
- Shilipu Village (十里铺村)
- Gonghou Village (宫后村)
- Gejiagou Village (葛家沟村)
- Beiyanzikou Village (北岩子口村)
- Heshangzhuang Village (和尚庄村)
- Dujiazhuang Village (杜家庄村)
- Fanjia Village (范家村)
- Lujia Village (路家村)
- Henan Village (河南村)
- Hebei Village (河北村)
- Gaojia Village (高家村)
- Majiatuan Village (马家疃村)
- Sunmazhuang Village (孙马庄村)
- Shengjia Village (盛家村)
- Caokuang Village (草夼村)
- Cao'an Village (草庵村)
- Luanjiakuang Village (栾家夼村)
- Xiaowolong Village (小卧龙村)
- Dawolong Village (大卧龙村)
- Guandong Village (观东村)
- Xujiawa Village (徐家洼村)
- Beizhangjiagou Village (北张家沟村)
- Houjiagou Village (侯家沟村)
- Beidingjiagou Village (北丁家沟村)
- Houkuang Village (后夼村)
- Liujiagou Village (留家沟村)
- Chenjia Village (陈家村)
- Moujia Village (牟家村)
- Shangsongjia Village (上宋家村)

== See also ==
- List of township-level divisions of Shandong
