= Mashang =

Mashang মশাং
- Village
- Location in Bangladesh
- Coordinates: 22°53′N 90°08′E
- Country: Bangladesh
- Division: Barisal Division
- District: Barisal District
- Upazila: Wazirpur Upazila

Area
  - Total: 4.60 km^{2} (1.78 sq mi)

Population (2022)
  - Total: 5,517
  - Density: 1,200/km^{2} (3,110/sq mi)
- Time zone: UTC+6 (Bangladesh Time)

Masang or Mashang is a village in Wazirpur Upazila of Barisal District in the Barisal Division of southern-central Bangladesh.

== Demography ==
According to the 2022 Census of Bangladesh, Mashang had 1,422 households and a population of 5,517. It has a total area of 4.60 km^{2} (1.78 sq mi).

== Notable people ==
- KS Firoz, actor
