= Qiaozhuang, Shandong =

Qiaozhuang 乔庄镇
- Town
- Location in Shandong Qiaozhuang (China)
- Coordinates: 37°20′56″N 118°12′26″E
- Country: People's Republic of China
- Province: Shandong
- Prefecture-level city: Binzhou
- County: Boxing County
- Time zone: UTC+8 (China Standard)

Qiaozhuang (Chinese: 乔庄; pinyin: Qiáozhuāng) is a town under the administration of Boxing County, Shandong, China. As of 2020, it administers the following 66 villages:

- Qiaozhuang Village
- Sanchazhong Village (三岔中村)
- Sanchadong Village (三岔东村)
- Sanchaxi Village (三岔西村)
- Xuefang Village (薛坊村)
- Gaijia Village (盖家村)
- Xiaozhuang Village (肖庄村)
- Xinyu Village (新于村)
- Chenjiahuang Village (陈家荒村)
- Wangwangzhuang Village (王旺庄村)
- Sanhe Village (三合村)
- Dinggao Village (丁高村)
- Zhangjiazhuang Village (张家庄村)
- Xinghuang Village (姓黄村)
- Liuguaizi Village (刘乖子村)
- Xingwei Village (兴魏村)
- Cangshang Village (苍上村)
- Huangjia Village (黄家村)
- Hexu Village (河徐村)
- Luocheli Village (落车李村)
- Mouwang Village (牟王村)
- Dazhuang Village (大庄村)
- Ningjia Village (宁家村)
- Xixiao Village (西小村)
- Liushanren Village (刘善人村)
- Jiaochang Village (焦常村)
- Jiaojia Village (焦家村)
- Dongcui Village (东崔村)
- Xicui Village (西崔村)
- Beijiaxu Village (北贾徐村)
- Nanjiawang Village (南贾王村)
- Guanzhuang Village (官庄村)
- Weijiazhuang Village (魏家庄村)
- Liuwang Village (刘王村)
- Zhangzhai Village (张寨村)
- Wangzhai Village (王寨村)
- Dongsanxin Village (东三新村)
- Shisanzhuang Village (十三庄村)
- Baowang Village (鲍王村)
- Lianglou Village (梁楼村)
- Liugu Village (刘古村)
- Niejia Village (聂家村)
- Xindian Village (辛店村)
- Liuwangzhuang Village (刘王庄村)
- Yulin Village (榆林村)
- Qianliujia Village (前刘家村)
- Wangping Village (王平村)
- Shouyili Village (守义李村)
- Xisanxin Village (西三新村)
- Tanjia Village (谭家村)
- Dongzhangwang Village (东张王村)
- Chengjia Village (程家村)
- Chengma Village (程马村)
- Yanmiao Village (闫庙村)
- Qihezhuang Village (七合庄村)
- Shuangtai Village (双台村)
- Caizhai Village (蔡寨村)
- Yuhuangtang Village (玉皇堂村)
- Shiwanggao Village (史王高村)
- Xinmin Village (新民村)
- Wangyuan Village (王院村)
- Qianxuchen Village (前徐陈村)
- Houxuchen Village (后徐陈村)
- Xifeng Village (西冯村)
- Dongfeng Village (东冯村)
- Beijiawang Village (北贾王村)
