= Guoli, Huantai County =

Guoli 果里镇
- Town
- Location in Shandong
- Coordinates: 36°54′21″N 118°4′57″E
- Country: People's Republic of China
- Province: Shandong
- Prefecture-level city: Zibo
- County: Huantai County
- Time zone: UTC+8 (China Standard)

Guoli (Chinese: 果里镇) is a town in Huantai County, Zibo, in central Shandong province, China. As of 2018, it has one residential community and 65 villages under its administration.
