= Jimo, Qingdao =

Coordinates: 36°23′N 120°28′E

Jimo 即墨区 Tsimo
- District
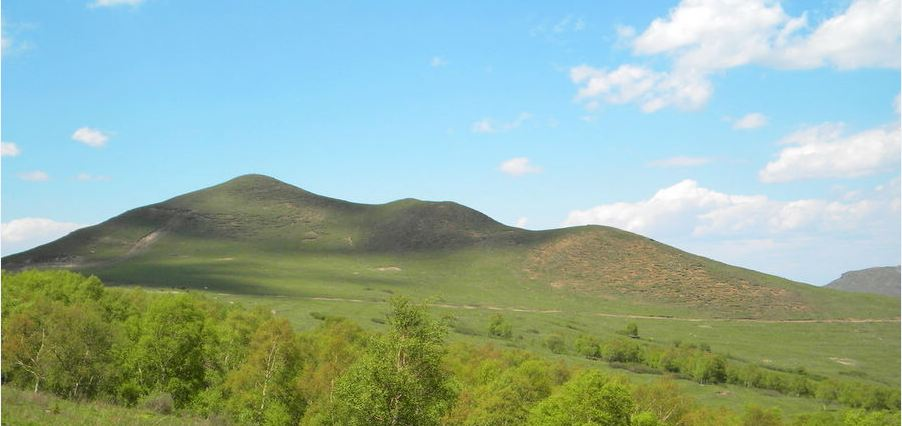
- Lingshan

- Location of Jimo within Qingdao

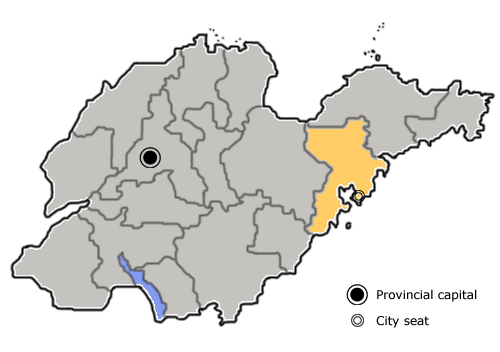
- Qingdao in Shandong
- Country: China
- Province: Shandong
- Sub-provincial city: Qingdao
- Converted to district: 30 October 2017

Area
  - Total: 1,780 km^{2} (690 sq mi)

Population (2019)
  - Total: 1,183,141
  - Density: 665/km^{2} (1,720/sq mi)
- Time zone: UTC+8 (China Standard)
- Postal code: 266200
- Area code: 0532
- Website: www.jimo.gov.cn

Jimo District (Chinese: 即墨区; pinyin: Jímò Qū), formerly Jimo City (即墨市), is a District of Qingdao, Shandong.

== Location ==
Jimo is located in the southwest of the Shandong Peninsula, bordered by the Yellow Sea on the east and Mount Lao on the south.

== Climate ==
Jimo has a moderate monsoon climate. The yearly average temperature is about 12.9 °C (55.2 °F), and average annual precipitation is 693.7 millimetres (27.31 in).

Climate data for Jimo, elevation 48 m (157 ft), (1991–2020 normals, extremes 1981–present)
Month	Jan	Feb	Mar	Apr	May	Jun	Jul	Aug	Sep	Oct	Nov	Dec	Year
Record high °C (°F)	15.5 (59.9)	22.5 (72.5)	27.5 (81.5)	33.3 (91.9)	35.4 (95.7)	39.9 (103.8)	38.3 (100.9)	38.1 (100.6)	38.6 (101.5)	30.4 (86.7)	25.5 (77.9)	18.3 (64.9)	39.9 (103.8)
Mean daily maximum °C (°F)	3.8 (38.8)	6.7 (44.1)	12.3 (54.1)	19.1 (66.4)	24.8 (76.6)	28.3 (82.9)	30.4 (86.7)	30.1 (86.2)	26.8 (80.2)	20.9 (69.6)	12.9 (55.2)	5.9 (42.6)	18.5 (65.3)
Daily mean °C (°F)	−1.3 (29.7)	1.3 (34.3)	6.8 (44.2)	13.4 (56.1)	19.3 (66.7)	23.2 (73.8)	26.3 (79.3)	26.0 (78.8)	21.7 (71.1)	15.3 (59.5)	7.7 (45.9)	0.9 (33.6)	13.4 (56.1)
Mean daily minimum °C (°F)	−5.3 (22.5)	−3.1 (26.4)	2.0 (35.6)	8.2 (46.8)	14.2 (57.6)	18.8 (65.8)	22.8 (73.0)	22.4 (72.3)	17.2 (63.0)	10.4 (50.7)	3.3 (37.9)	−3.0 (26.6)	9.0 (48.2)
Record low °C (°F)	−17.3 (0.9)	−16.6 (2.1)	−10.5 (13.1)	−5.3 (22.5)	0.0 (32.0)	8.3 (46.9)	15.2 (59.4)	13.5 (56.3)	5.2 (41.4)	−3.3 (26.1)	−8.2 (17.2)	−14.8 (5.4)	−17.3 (0.9)
Average precipitation mm (inches)	10.7 (0.42)	14.8 (0.58)	15.7 (0.62)	31.2 (1.23)	53.1 (2.09)	70.7 (2.78)	153.1 (6.03)	208.5 (8.21)	66.1 (2.60)	30.0 (1.18)	27.0 (1.06)	11.2 (0.44)	692.1 (27.24)
Average precipitation days (≥ 0.1 mm)	3.3	3.6	4.0	5.8	6.8	7.4	10.7	11.5	6.9	4.9	4.9	4.1	73.9
Average snowy days	3.6	2.7	1.1	0.1	0	0	0	0	0	0	0.6	2.9	11
Average relative humidity (%)	65	61	55	55	60	68	78	79	72	67	68	66	66
Mean monthly sunshine hours	167.7	170.2	218.7	234.0	252.5	218.4	187.8	192.0	203.7	203.1	170.4	165.0	2,383.5
Percentage possible sunshine	54	55	59	59	58	50	43	46	55	59	56	55	54
Source: China Meteorological Administrationall-time extreme temperatureall-time August high

== History ==
Jimo was established in the Eastern Zhou dynasty, at which time it was the second largest settlement in Shandong. The Siege of Jimo in 279 BC, otherwise unremarkable, is remembered for the ruse that ended it. Tian Dan was a general of the State of Qi who had just lost 70 cities to the Yan. When Jimo, their penultimate city, was under fire, he collected more than 1,000 oxen, tied sharp daggers to their ears, tied straw to their tails, and dressed them in colourful cloth to make them look like dragons. At dead of night the Qi set the tails alight and drove the oxen towards the enemy camp. The panicking enemy soldiers were wiped out, and the Qi regained all the lost cities.

=== German Colony and the Siege of Tsingtao ===
On 6 March 1898, the city of Tsimo (Jimo) became part of the Kiautschou Bay Leased Territory. By the time of the First World War, the Germans had set up a small outpost in Tsimo, which on 13 September 1914, was taken by advancing Japanese cavalry during the Siege of Tsingtao. After its capture, Japanese cavalry and engineers alongside the 23rd Infantry Brigade would arrive at Tsimo on 18 September. During the siege, an airfield was built and by 21 September, Japanese Army Nieuport IV.Gs began operating from Tsimo in an unsuccessful attempt to bomb the German airfield and destroy the lone Rumpler Taube. After the end of the war, the Kiautschou Bay Leased Territory (along with Tsimo) was ceded to Japan and returned to the Chinese in 1922.

=== Chinese civil war ===
During the Chinese civil war, 90,000 peasants from Jimo participated in the Civil War on the communist side. Rural women in Jimo also contributed to the war effort through making and supplying People's Liberation Army soldiers with 5,000 pairs of shoes.

== Administrative divisions ==
As of October 2021, Jimo District has 11 subdistricts and 4 towns: Huanxiu Subdistrict, Chaohai Subdistrict, Tongji Subdistrict, Bei'an Subdistrict, Longshan Subdistrict, Longquan Subdistrict, Aoshanwei Subdistrict, Wenquan Subdistrict, Lingshan Subdistrict, Lancun Subdistrict, Daxin Subdistrict, Tianheng Town, Jinkou Town, Duanbolan Town, Yifengdian Town, and Tongji New Economic Zone and Tianheng Island Provincial Tourist Resort.

== Tourism ==
Aoshan Bay and Tianheng Island are its main tourism resources.

== Transport ==
- Oceantec Valley Line
- In Jimo District, there are 2 national class 2 open docks in Aoshan and Women's Island, 3 highways including Qingyin Expressway, Qingxin Expressway and Weiqing Expressway as well as national and provincial highways such as Qingyan, Qingwei and Qingsha, Jiaoji Railway, Lanyan Railway and Qingrong Railway running through the whole territory.
- In 2021, Jimo District has a variety of motor vehicles 455,000, an increase of 7.7%, including 435,000 passenger trucks, an increase of 7.7%. The total road mileage is 3456.5 kilometers, including 140 kilometers of high-speed roads, and the density of road network is 179.9 kilometers per 100 square kilometers. Road passenger traffic of 39.99 million people, passenger turnover of 61.187 million kilometers; 14.77 million tons of freight, freight turnover of 398.90 million tons of kilometers.

== Social business ==
=== Education ===
The Jimo District is home to Qingdao University, Qingdao Agricultural University, Shandong University (Qingdao), and Texas Institute of Science and Technology.

In 2021, there are 637 schools in Jimo District with 210,500 students, including 441 kindergartens with 49,000 children; 147 elementary schools with 87,000 students; 32 junior high schools with 45,700 students; 12 high schools with 22,000 students; 3 vocational schools with 6,431 students; and 2 special education centers with 416 students. 416 students. The total number of teaching staff is 20,100, the enrollment rate of school-age children is 100%, and the completion rate of nine-year compulsory education is 100%.

=== Cultural business ===
National first-class library: Qingdao Jimo District Library. National Grade 1 Cultural Center: Jimo District Cultural Center of Qingdao City.

As of 2021, Jimo District has 17 science and technology and culture service centers, 1026 libraries of various types, 414,400 books in district libraries, 1 district cultural center, 1 district museum, 1 Liuqiang Theatre Company, 9 movie theaters, and 12 awards of various kinds above Qingdao City. It has two TV channels of news synthesis and life service, one radio frequency (FM101.7), district party committee organ newspaper "New Jimo", China Jimo website, Know Jimo client, Jimo TV public number, "New Jimo" official micro and Jimo cell phone newspaper, etc. It has built a full media platform of "one, one network, one newspaper, two micros, one end and N number". media platform. The coverage rate of radio population is 100%, and the coverage rate of TV population is 100%.

=== Health care ===
As of 2021, there are 1138 health institutions of various types in Jimo District, including 36 hospitals, 21 town health centers, 21 community health service centers and service stations, 384 clinics, infirmaries, health clinics and nursing stations, and 630 village health offices. A total of 5,466 beds, 7,747 health technicians, including: 3,339 licensed physicians and licensed assistant physicians, 3,267 registered nurses.

=== Social security ===
In 2021, the number of people participating in pension insurance in Jimo District is 849,300, including: 263,900 employees of urban workers' pension insurance, 25,600 people of institutions' pension insurance, and 559,800 people participating in urban and rural residents' social pension insurance. The number of people participating in unemployment insurance is 235,700, including: 213,500 urban workers and 22,200 institutions. The number of people participating in basic medical insurance is 114.26, including: 31.74 people participating in basic medical insurance for employees and 82.52 people participating in basic medical insurance for residents. The number of people participating in maternity insurance is 317,000.

In 2021, there will be 19 adoptive social welfare institutions of various types in Jimo District, with 2,588 beds in social welfare institutions and 995 people in the institutions. Urban and rural residents of the minimum living security object 16,600,000 people, residents of low security funds planned to spend 203 million yuan. The number of people supported by the five-guarantee households is 761, and the amount of subsidies for the five-guarantee households is 17.12 million yuan.

== Official website ==
Media related to Jimo at Wikimedia Commons

- Official website
- Aoshan Bay
