= Daqiao =

Daqiao (simplified Chinese: 大桥; traditional Chinese: 大橋 unless otherwise noted) could refer to:

== People ==
- Elder Qiao (fl. 2nd century), one of the Qiao sisters who married the Han dynasty warlord Sun Ce

== People's Republic of China ==
=== Towns ===
- Daqiao, Dingyuan County, in Dingyuan County, Anhui
- Daqiao, Fujian, in Gutian County, Fujian
- Daqiao, Gansu, in Xihe County, Gansu
- Daqiao, Maoming (笪桥), in Huazhou, Guangdong
- Daqiao, Renhua County, in Renhua County, Guangdong
- Daqiao, Ruyuan County, in Ruyuan Yao Autonomous County, Guangdong
- Daqiao, Binyang County, in Binyuan County, Guangxi
- Daqiao, Luchuan County, in Luchuan County, Guangxi
- Daqiao, Yancheng, in Yancheng, Jiangsu
- Daqiao, Yangzhou, in Yangzhou, Jiangsu
- Daqiao, Ganzhou, in Xinfeng County, Jiangxi
- Daqiao, Xiushui County, in Xiushui County, Jiangxi
- Daqiao, Dong'e County, in Dong'e County, Shandong
- Daqiao, Hejiang County, in Hejiang County, Sichuan
- Daqiao, Mianning County, in Mianning County, Sichuan
- Daqiao, Nanbu County, in Nanbu County, Sichuan
- Daqiao, Pingwu County, in Pingwu County, Sichuan
- Daqiao, Jiangshan, in Jiangshan, Zhejiang
- Daqiao, Jiaxing, in Jiaxing, Zhejiang

=== Townships ===
- Daqiao Township, Neixiang County, in Neixiang County, Henan
- Daqiao Township, Weishi County, in Weishi County, Henan
- Daqiao Yao Ethnic Township, in Lanshan County, Hunan
- Daqiao Township, Jilin, in Dunhua, Jilin
- Daqiao Township, Xinjiang, in Baicheng County, Xinjiang
- Daqiao Township, Huize County, in Huize County, Yunnan
- Daqiao Township, Shiping County, in Shiping County, Yunnan

=== Subdistricts ===
- Daqiao Subdistrict, Anqing, in Yixiu District, Anqing, Anhui
- Daqiao Subdistrict, Zhangshu, in Zhangshu, Jiangxi
- Daqiao Subdistrict, Jinan, in Jinan, Shandong
- Daqiao Subdistrict, Shanghai, in Yangpu District, Shanghai

== Taiwan ==
- Daqiao railway station, in Yongkang District, Tainan

== See also ==
- Daqiaotou (disambiguation)
