= Zhoucheng Subdistrict =

Subdistrict in Tai'an City, Shandong Province, Dongping County

Zhoucheng Subdistrict 州城街道
- Subdistrict
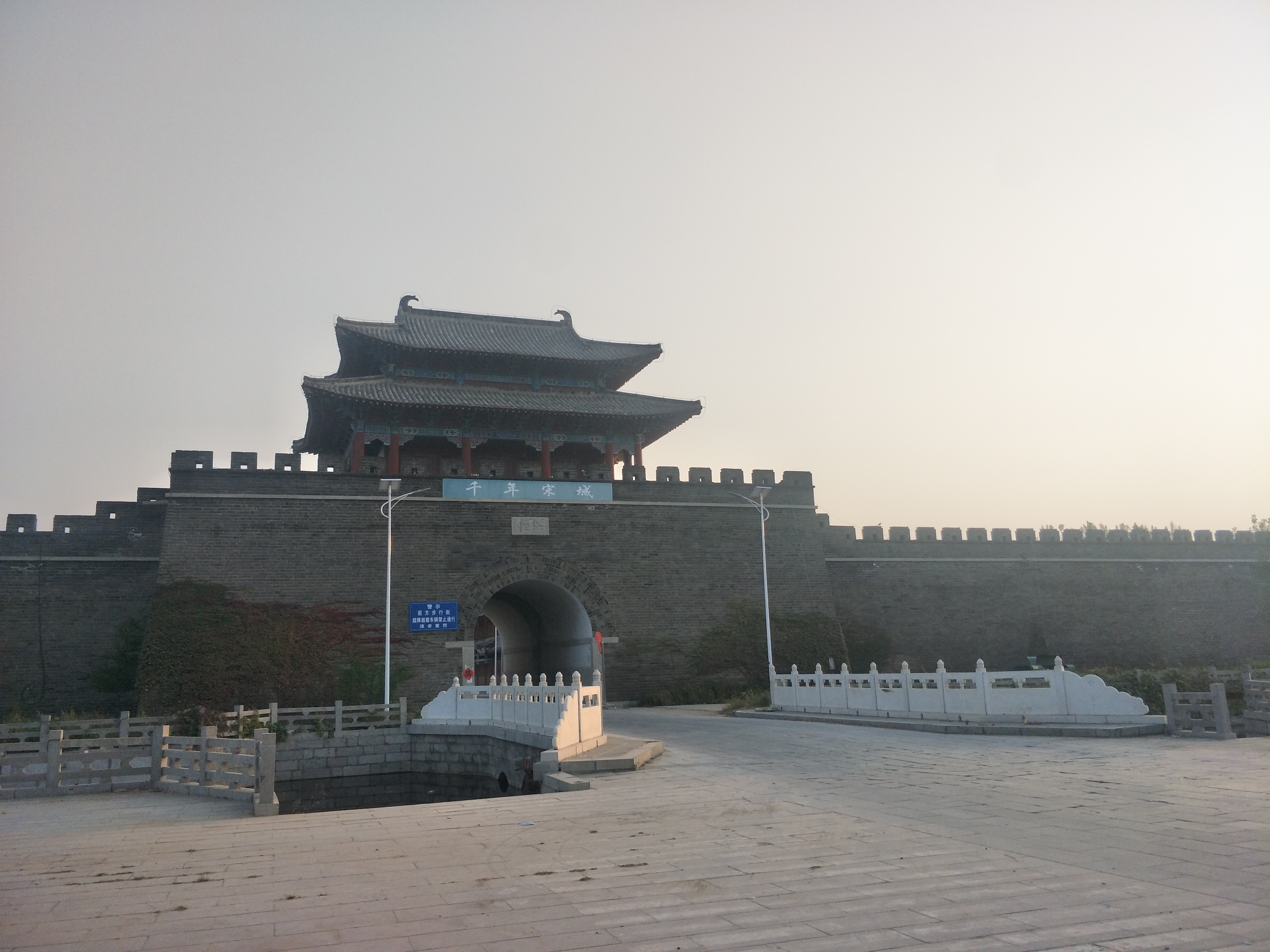
- City gate of Zhoucheng

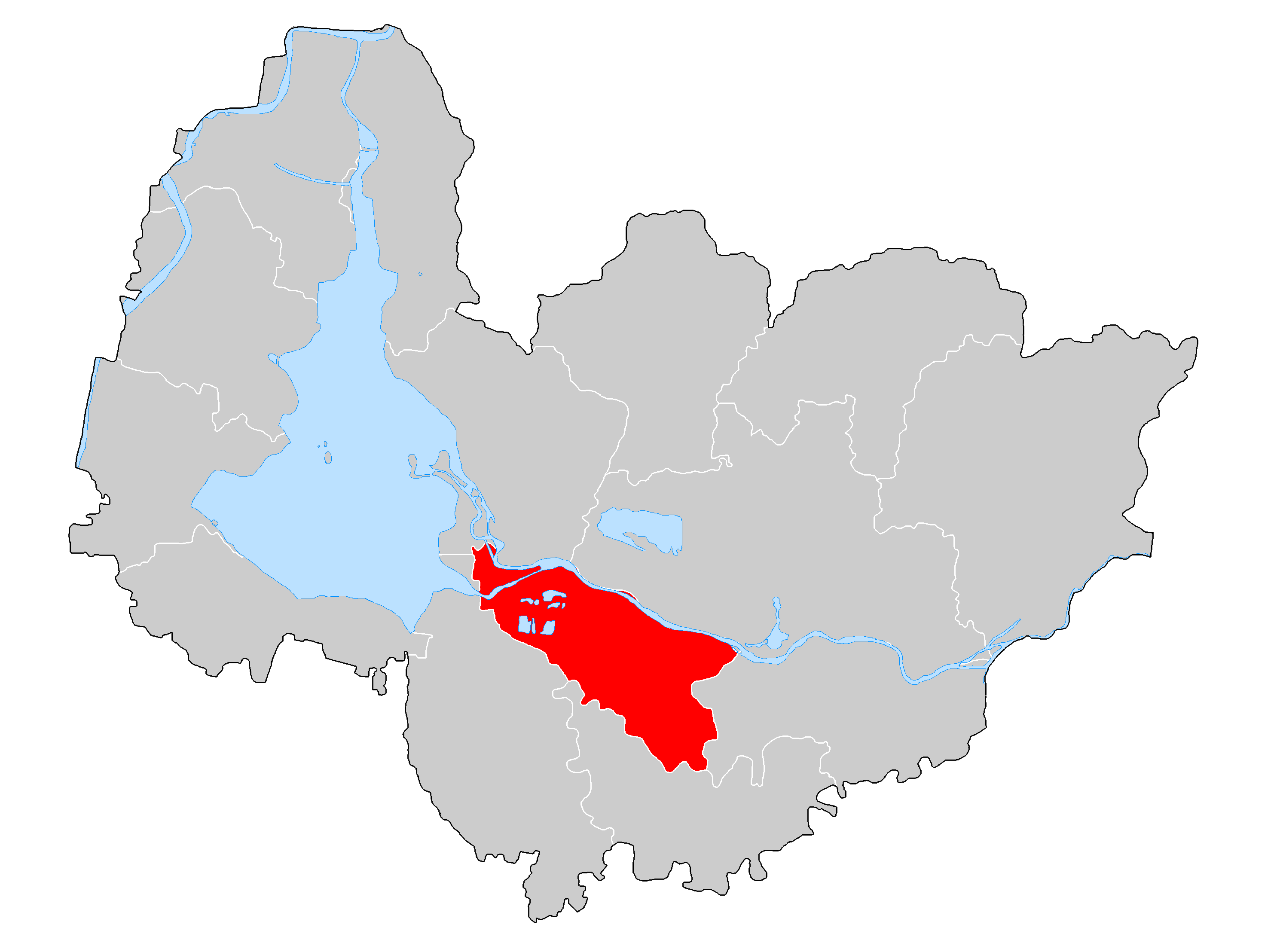
- Zhoucheng Subdistrict is located in Dongping County
- Coordinates: 35.91222°N 116.31167°E
- Administrative district: Dongping County
- Old names: Qia prefecture (恰乡城), Wenyang town (汶阳乡), Dongping county (东平一区), Chengguan district (城关区), Chengguan town (城关镇), Chengguan commune (城关公社), Dongping county (东平公社), Zhoucheng district (州城区), Zhoucheng town (州城镇)
- Established: June, 2010

Population
  - Total: 61,559
  - Density: 847/km^{2} (2,190/sq mi)
- Postal code: 538
- Postal code: 271506
- Area code: 37/09/23/002/000

Zhoucheng Subdistrict of Dongping County, Tai'an Prefecture, Shandong Province, People's Republic of China, is situated in the central part of Dongping County. It is bordered to the south by the towns of Shahezhan and Xinhuzhen, to the north by Dongping Subdistrict and Laohuzhen, to the east by Pengji Subdistrict, and the west by Dongping Lake. Zhoucheng Subdistrict administers 71 administrative villages, covers an area of 72 square kilometers, and has a registered population of 61,559 people. It was established in 2010, replacing the former Zhoucheng Town.

In the third year of the Northern Song dynasty's Xianping era (1000 AD), the original capital of Yun Prefecture, Xuchang City, was submerged, and the prefecture of Yun was moved to this location, which was then named Zhoucheng. Until 1982, when the county seat was moved from Zhoucheng to Houtun in Dongping Subdistrict, Zhoucheng served as the political, economic, and cultural center of Dongping County. It was home to various historical sites and relics, making it a significant tourist destination in Shandong Province. Additionally, Zhoucheng Subdistrict is the birthplace of Wan Li, a prominent leader in the history of the People's Republic of China.

== History ==
=== From Pre-Qin to the Qing dynasty ===
According to ancient texts, during the Xia and Shang periods, the area that is now Zhoucheng Town belonged to Xuzhou, one of the Nine Provinces, and was known as "Qià Xiāngchéng" (恰乡城) during the Shang dynasty. In the Spring and Autumn period, it was part of the State of Lu. During the Qin dynasty, the region around Zhoucheng Town fell under the jurisdiction of Xue Commandery. From the Han dynasty to the Tang dynasty, it was successively part of Jidong State, Dahe Commandery, Dongping State, Dongping Commandery, and Yunzhou. In the early Northern Song dynasty, the area around Zhoucheng belonged to Yunzhou. At that time, the administrative center of Yunzhou was in Xuchang City, situated in the present territory of Laohuzhen in Dongping County. However, in the third year of the Xianping era (1000 AD), due to a breach in the Wanglingsao of the Yellow River, Xuchang City, being at a lower elevation, suffered severe flooding. The Prefect of Yunzhou, Yao Xuan, subsequently built a new city in a higher-lying area in Wenyang Town, still referred to as Xucheng. This city became the modern-day Zhoucheng, and from then on, Zhoucheng became the new political center of Dongping. Following the fall of the Northern Song dynasty, Zhoucheng briefly served as one of the capital cities of Liu Qi. During the Jin dynasty, the Shandong Western Route was established, with its administrative center in Dongping Prefecture, where the prefectural government was located in what is now Zhoucheng. During the Yuan dynasty, Zhoucheng served as the administrative center of the Dongping Route of the Ministry of Personnel. With the opening of the Grand Canal, Dongping became an important hub for waterborne transportation, and it was referred to as a "magnificent and grand metropolis" by Marco Polo in his travel accounts.

During the Ming and Qing periods, Zhoucheng served as the administrative center of Dongping Prefecture. In the late Ming dynasty, residents in Dongping Prefecture gathered and set fire to the prefectural office. In the 14th year of the Chongzhen era (1641), a peasant army led by Li Qingshan captured the prefecture, but later, they were defeated by Ming dynasty forces. During the Qing dynasty, the Baojia system was implemented. In the current jurisdiction of Zhoucheng Subdistrict, it was divided into different Bao districts, including Xinzibao (Southeast Xinzibao, Northwest Xinzibao), Ruiren Bao in the east, Furen Bao in the west, Aili Bao in the south, and Yifang Bao in the north. In the late Qing dynasty and early Republic of China, Dongping County faced security issues, with peasant armies and armed bandits attacking the county town multiple times. In the first year of the Tongzhi era (1861), Zhang Lexing's Nian army crossed the Grand Canal and besieged Zhoucheng twice but failed to capture it.

=== Republic of China ===
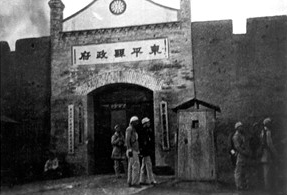
Dongping County government (1945).

In 1913, Dongping Prefecture was renamed Dongping County, with the prefectural city continuing to serve as the county seat, and the Bao system was retained. In 1918, bandit Zhang Zhanyuan broke into Dongping County and, along with the mutinous garrison led by He Duoyu, looted the county. In 1926, the Hongqiang Party, composed of peasants, gathered to attack the prefectural city. In 1931, the Bao system was abolished, and district offices and townships were established. At that time, the northwestern and central areas of what is now Zhoucheng Subdistrict belonged to Dongping District 1, which included four towns and four townships. Some southeastern villages were part of the fourth, sixth, and seventh townships of Dongping District 5.

In October 1937, the Chinese Communist Party (CCP) established the Dongping County Work Committee. On December 25 of the same year, Japanese warplanes launched an air raid on Zhoucheng, causing more than 30 casualties. Following the air raid, Sun Yonghan, who was then the county head of Dongping, escaped to Zhoucheng. On August 17, 1938, Japanese troops and local militias from southwestern Shandong attacked Zhoucheng. The temporary Dongping County government organized over a hundred people to resist, but the defense failed, and Japanese forces subsequently occupied Zhoucheng. In 1939, the Japanese set up a garrison in Zhoucheng. In August 1940, the Dongping County Anti-Japanese Democratic Government, under CCP leadership, incorporated Zhoucheng into Dongping District 1 and established an Anti-Japanese District Office in 1943. On the night of October 18, 1943, CCP forces launched a surprise attack on Dongping County, resulting in over a hundred Japanese and Allied troops killed or injured before retreating. By 1944, most of Dongping County had become a CCP revolutionary base area. However, the area around Zhoucheng Street, where the county seat was located, remained under Japanese control. Japanese forces had positions in Zhoucheng, Gezhenyuan, Nanguan, and Menglou within the Zhoucheng Subdistrict. On May 17, 1945, the Eighth Route Army launched the Dongping Campaign to liberate Dongping. By May 18, the Eighth Route Army had captured Zhoucheng and defeated the Japanese forces by the 19th. After the CCP took control of Zhoucheng, they removed parts of the city walls.

In 1947, during the Second Chinese Civil War, both the Nationalist (Kuomintang) and CCP forces contended for control of Zhoucheng. In March 1947, the Nationalist army took Zhoucheng but fled on April 21. They briefly reclaimed Zhoucheng on August 4 but were later defeated by the Liberation Army in November. In December, the Dong'e County Homecoming Regiment captured Zhoucheng. In the same month, the Liberation Army launched an eastward campaign, recapturing Zhoucheng early the following year.

=== People's Republic of China ===
After the establishment of the People's Republic of China in 1949, Zhoucheng remained under the jurisdiction of Dongping District 1. In December 1949, Chengguan District was separated from District 1. In April 1951, Chengguan District was merged back into District 1, which then included several towns: Lianhuawan, Xiliangcun, Houheyayi, Zhifang, Chenfang, Taoyuan, Nanzhen, Beizhen, Dongzhen, Xizhen, Yaowo, Liulin, and Liulou.

In 1955, the four towns of Xizhen, Dongzhen, Nanzhen, and Beizhen in the vicinity of the District 1 county seat were merged into Chengguan Township. At this time, District 1 comprised nine townships. Later that year, District 1 was renamed Chengguan District. By the end of 1956, some townships were again merged, leading to the abolition of Chengguan District. Chengguan Town directly fell under county jurisdiction, while Chenfang and Liangcun townships were initially transferred to Pengji District but were soon returned.

In October 1958, during the People's Commune Movement, towns were dissolved. Chengguan Town was reorganized into Chengguan People's Commune. The eastern part of the original Chengguan District and the western part of Pengji District became Liangcun People's Commune. On December 19, 1958, the Liangcun Commune was dissolved, and its territory was divided between Chengguan Commune and Pengji Commune. In October 1959, Dongping County was abolished, and Chengguan Commune was transferred to Wenshang County. In 1960, Chengguan Commune was transferred to Liangshan County, and in 1961, it was once again transferred to Wenshang County. In 1962, Dongping County was reestablished, and Chengguan Commune returned to Dongping, remaining the county seat.

In January 1980, Chengguan Commune was renamed Zhoucheng Town. In November 1982, the county seat of Dongping County was relocated from Zhoucheng to Hutun Village in Sicheng Commune. Zhoucheng continued as the location of Zhoucheng Town. In April 1984, Zhoucheng Town was upgraded to Zhoucheng District, which included Zhoucheng Town, Sunzhifang Township, and Xiliangcun Town. In October 1985, Zhoucheng District was dissolved, and the townships of Sunzhifang and Xiliangcun were merged into Zhoucheng Town. In June 2010, Zhoucheng Town was dissolved and reorganized as Zhoucheng Street.

== Environment ==
The location of Zhoucheng Subdistrict in Shandong Province

The Zhoucheng Subdistrict is located in the central part of Dongping County in Shandong Province, China. It is bordered by Pengji Subdistrict to the east, Dongping Lake to the west, Xinhuzhen and Shahezhan to the south, and separated Laohuzhen and Dongping Street by the Daqing River to the north. The subdistrict stretches approximately 10.6 kilometers from north to south and 12.8 kilometers from east to west, covering a total area of 72 square kilometers. The administrative center of Zhoucheng Street is located in the western part of Zhoucheng, about 25 kilometers from the urban center of Dongping County.

Zhoucheng Subdistrict

Climate chart (precipitation, max. and min. temperature)
J	F	M	A	M	J	J	A	S	O	N	D
2 4 −8	21 9 −3	14 16 2	51 20 8	78 23 13	41 31 20	208 31 22	104 26 19	84 26 16	14 24 9	34 15 2	17 5 −6
- █ Average max. and min. temperatures in °C
- █ Precipitation totals in mm
Imperial conversion
J	F	M	A	M	J	J	A	S	O	N	D
0.1 39 18	0.8 48 27	0.6 61 36	2 68 46	3.1 73 55	1.6 88 68	8.2 88 72	4.1 79 66	3.3 79 61	0.6 75 48	1.3 59 36	0.7 41 21
- █ Average max. and min. temperatures in °F
- █ Precipitation totals in inches

Zhoucheng Subdistrict is situated in the alluvial plain of the Dawen River, characterized by a generally east-high, west-low, south-high, and north-low topography. The area is predominantly flat with minimal elevation changes. In the eastern part of the subdistrict, some areas have elevations exceeding 40 meters, with the highest point being 42.3 meters. Most of the subdistrict has elevations below 40 meters, with the lowest point at 39 meters and an average elevation of 38 meters. The primary topographical feature is a plain, with some marshy areas present in the western part of the Zhoucheng Subdistrict. The soil in Zhoucheng is mainly alluvial, found predominantly in the western part, and brown soil, which is more common in certain villages in the eastern part.

Zhoucheng Subdistrict is situated to the west of Dongping Lake, Shandong's second-largest freshwater lake. The subdistrict is home to several rivers, including the Daqing River, Zhifang River, Weizi River, Xiaoqing River, and Paisen River. The Daqing River is the largest river within Zhoucheng's boundaries. It enters from the Ma Zhuang area and flows from east to west along the northern edge of the subdistrict, serving as a natural boundary between Zhoucheng Subdistrict and the neighboring areas of Dongping Street and Laohu Town. The Xiaoqing River, also known as the Nansha River, flows along the southern edge of Zhoucheng. It follows the ancient channel of the Wen River and approximately divides Zhoucheng Subdistrict from Shahezhan Town. The Xiaoqing River is 30 kilometers long and about 100 meters wide, though its riverbed is no longer actively used. The Weizi River, also known as the drainage ditch, enters Zhoucheng Subdistrict from Pengji Subdistrict and flows through the southeastern part of the Zhoucheng Subdistrict. The Paisen River, an artificially excavated river, was created in 1960. It is 30 kilometers long and about 10 meters wide. It was primarily constructed to alleviate waterlogging issues in the eastern part of the Zhoucheng Subdistrict. Zhoucheng Subdistrict benefits from relatively abundant water resources. However, most of the surface water in the area is saline-alkaline and unsuitable for drinking. However, the groundwater quality is better, with an estimated usable groundwater resource of about 8.84 million cubic meters. Many residents rely on well water for drinking.

Zhoucheng Subdistrict has three types of vegetation: crop vegetation, forest vegetation, and aquatic vegetation. The crop vegetation primarily consists of crops, covering more than half of the total area of the subdistrict. Aquatic vegetation includes reeds, bulrushes, and others, primarily found along the rivers, lakes, and marshy areas within the boundaries of Zhoucheng. Forest vegetation mainly consists of poplar trees, willow trees, and pagoda trees. In terms of mineral resources, the area possesses river sand, saltpeter, and mineral water. River sand is mainly extracted from the Daqing River, and there are also deposits of brick and tile clay in the eastern part of the Zhoucheng Subdistrict. The presence of the Pengji Iron Ore Prediction Zone, which runs through the northeast part of the Zhoucheng Subdistrict, suggests the potential distribution of iron ore in that area.

Zhoucheng Subdistrict experiences a warm temperate continental monsoon climate. The average annual precipitation is 667 millimeters, with the highest rainfall in July, averaging 208 millimeters, and the lowest in January, with only 2 millimeters. The average annual temperature is 14 °C, with July being the warmest month at an average of 26 °C, and January the coldest, averaging -2 °C. Natural disasters in the area include hailstorms, droughts, floods, windstorms, frosts, and lightning strikes. Hailstorms, occurring on average once every three years, are most common in May and June.

== Administrative division ==
Zhoucheng Subdistrict administers 71 administrative villages and 80 natural villages. The administrative villages under Zhoucheng Subdistrict are as follows:

Hehua Lou Village, Sungang Village, Renhezui Village, Zhifang Village, Wuzhuang Village, Lumaofen Village, Chenfang Village, Sunmiao Village, Jielou Village, Xizhengzhuang Village, Wang Taoyuan Village, Li Taoyuan Village, Shi Taoyuan Village, Chen Di Village, Shiliulin Village, Chen Liulin Village, Yu Hai Village, Zhang Liulin Village, Shuanglou Village, Liutaoyuan Village, Danlou Village, Hou Heya Village, Tianzhuang Village, Dongzhengzhuang Village, Wuman Village, Menglou Village, Gaozhuang Village, Jiahe Village, Qizhuang Village, Mazhuang Village, Houlianhuawan Village, Qianlianhuawan Village, Daliangzhuang Village, Wanglouxi Village, Jiehekou Village, Makou Village, Zhanglou Village, Mengzhuang Village, Wanglou Village, Liangchang Village, Wangzhuang Village, Haizi Village, Zhan Yuan Village, Fenglou Village, Duyao Wa Village, Wang Yao Wa Village, Gezhen Yuan Village, Tingpo Village, Liangcun Village, Yangzhuang Village, Fuzhuang Village, Liulou Village, Ronghua Shu Village, Zhang Quan Village, Lou Cha Village, Zhangzhuang Village, Xuzhuang Village, Paifang Village, Nanmen Village, Guanmiao Village, Guijingsi Village, Nanguan Village, Nanzhuang Village, Xiguan Village, Daximen Village, Beimen Village, Ximen Village, Dadiangmen Village, Wenmiao Village, Dasizhuang Village, Xiaodongmen Village.

== Economy ==
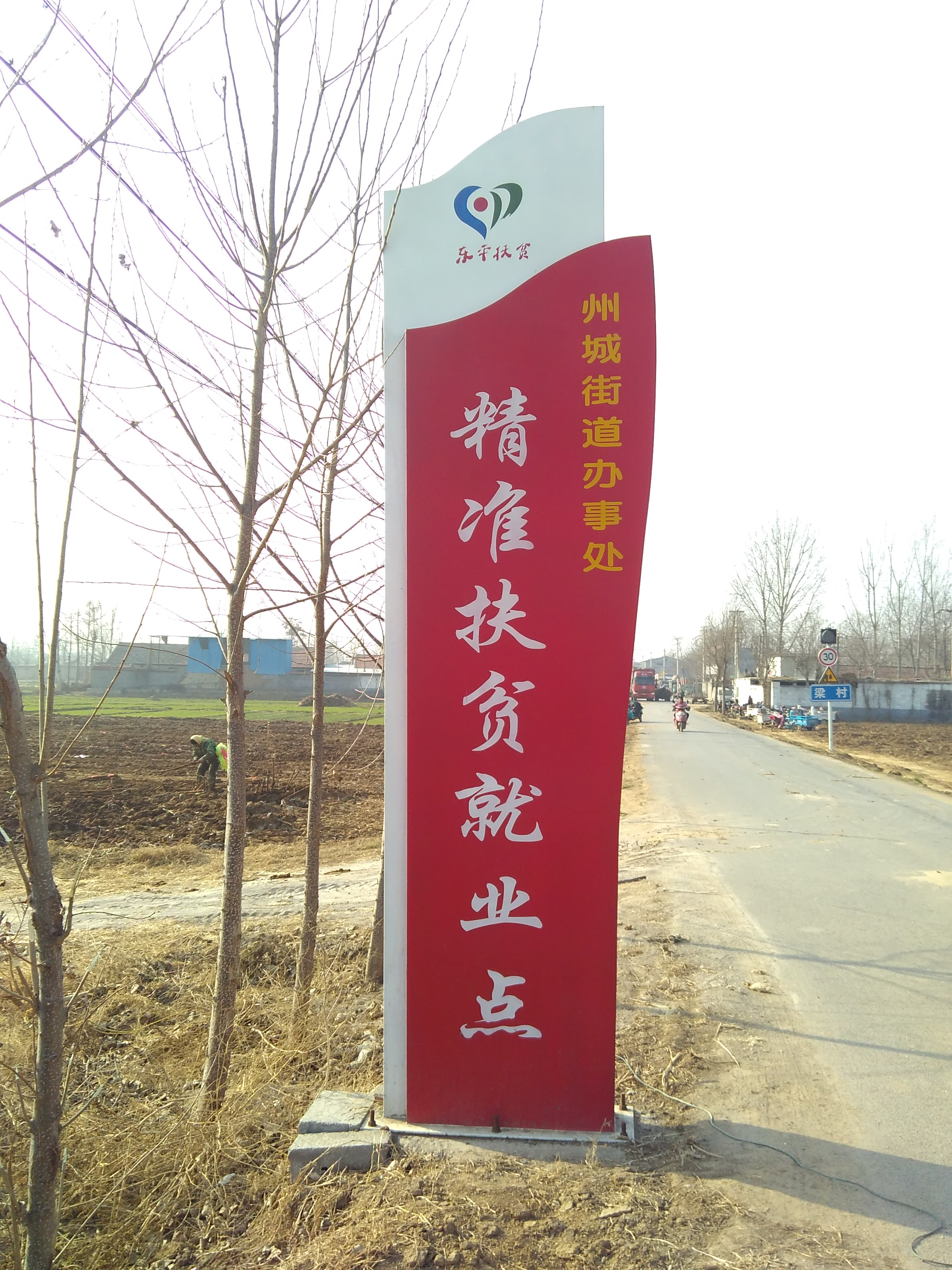
Zhoucheng Subdistrict is a targeted poverty alleviation employment point.

In 2018, the local fiscal revenue of the Zhoucheng Subdistrict was 19.06 million yuan. In agriculture, as of 2015, Zhoucheng Subdistrict had approximately 57,000 mu (around 3,800 hectares) of arable land. In 2012, the agricultural output value was 240 million yuan, the livestock output value was 210 million yuan, and the forestry output value was 12.6 million yuan. Grain production was 58,000 tons, while the total production of meat and poultry eggs was 5,400 tons and 3,700 tons, respectively. The per capita net income of farmers was 9,146 yuan. By 2016, the per capita cash income of farmers in Zhoucheng Subdistrict had reached 14,362 yuan. In the commercial sector, in 2011, Zhoucheng Subdistrict had 1,600 commercial outlets and four large-scale markets. The total social commodity sales amounted to 800 million yuan that year.

Regarding industry, before 1958, handicrafts were the primary industrial activity in the area. In 1958, Chengguan Commune was established, leading to the creation of communal enterprises such as machinery factories, brick and tile factories, and welfare factories. Subsequently, the machinery factory was handed over to the production brigade, and the brick and tile factory and weaving factory were transferred to the Dongping County Civil Affairs Bureau or the Dongping Handicraft Industry Cooperative. Only the Chengguan Farm Machinery Factory remained as a communal enterprise, and in 1976, five more communal enterprises were established. After the people's commune was dissolved, these enterprises were transformed into town-run enterprises. By 1992, Zhoucheng Subdistrict had eight key town-run enterprises with an industrial output value of 12.76 million yuan. After 1998, town-run enterprises gradually transformed into private enterprises. By 2016, the main business income of Zhoucheng Subdistrict's industrial enterprises was 13.94 billion yuan, with major industries including textiles, papermaking, toys, clothing, machinery, wood processing, and mineral water production.

== Demography ==
In 2018, the registered population of Zhoucheng Subdistrict was 61,559 people. The majority of Zhoucheng Subdistrict's population is Han Chinese, with smaller populations of other ethnic groups such as Hui, Manchu, and Zhuang. Zhoucheng is one of the main residential areas for the Hui ethnic group in Dongping County, and Beimen Village in Zhoucheng Subdistrict is a Hui ethnic village. In 2011, out of the 61,000 people in Zhoucheng Street, 60,201 were Han Chinese, constituting 98.9% of the total population, and 785 were Hui, making up 1.1% of the total population. In that year, the birth rate was 13.9‰, the death rate was 7.65‰, resulting in a natural growth rate of 5.44‰.

During the 2010 Chinese Sixth National Population Census, Zhoucheng Subdistrict had a total population of 53,699 people, residing in 15,041 households, with an average of 3.43 people per household. Children under the age of 14 numbered 7,865, accounting for 14.64% of the total population; those aged 15–64 were 39,800, making up 74.11% of the total population; and those aged 65 and above were 6,034, representing 11.23% of the total population. There were 26,330 males, constituting 49.03% of the total population, and 27,369 females, making up 50.96% of the total population. Among the locally residing population, 52,205 people held local household registration, accounting for 97.21%.

During the 2000 Chinese Fifth National Population Census, Zhoucheng Subdistrict had 15,857 households and a total population of 56,799 people. Over the next decade, the population of Zhoucheng Subdistrict decreased by 3,100 people, with a decline in the proportion of children under the age of 14 and an increase in the proportion of the working-age population aged 15 to 64.

== Infrastructure ==
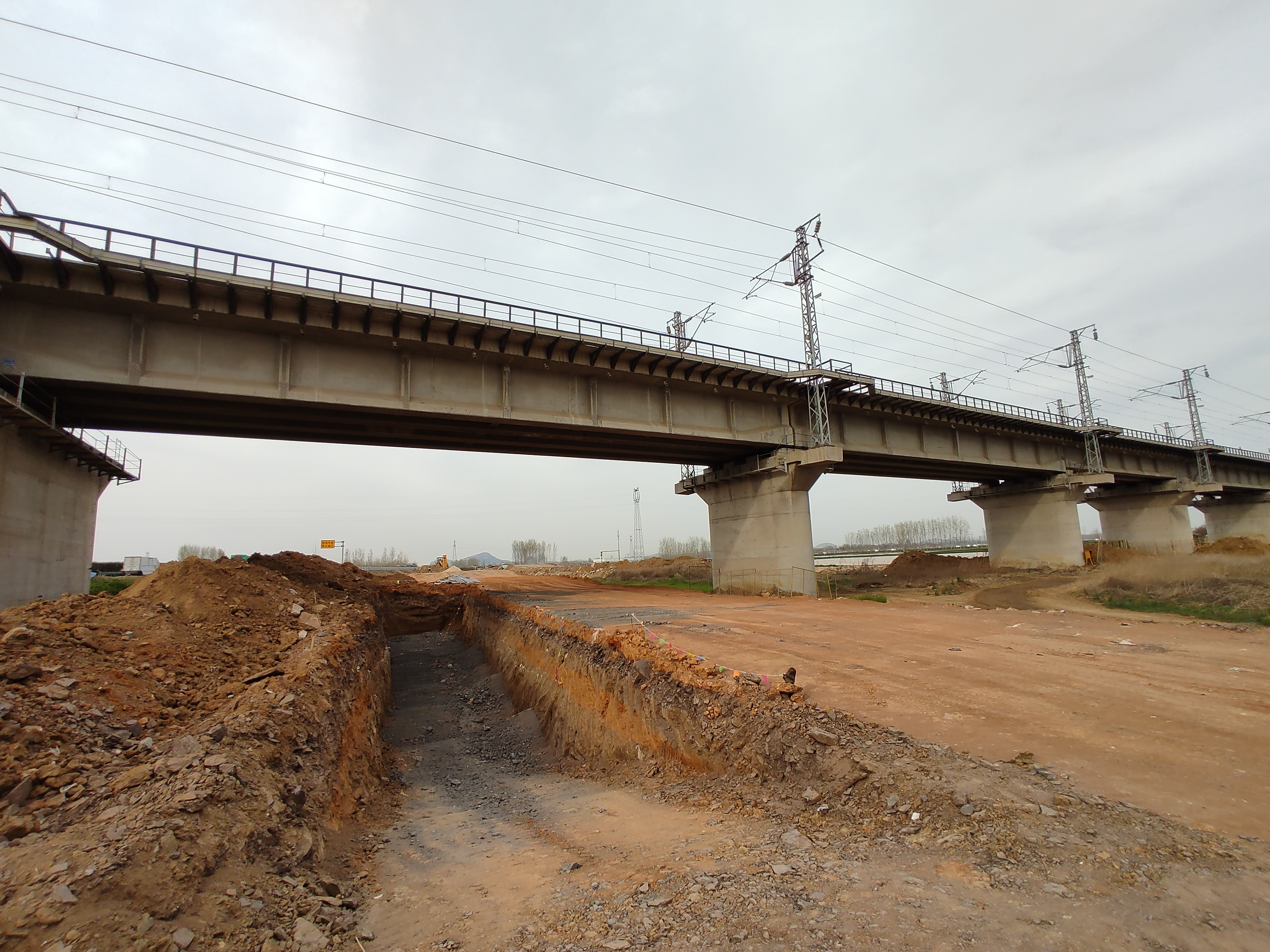
The Jinyulu Railway section of Zhoucheng Street

In 2018, Zhoucheng Subdistrict had a total of 39 medical and health institutions, including 588 hospital beds and 167 practicing physicians. In 2012, there were two county-owned hospitals in Zhoucheng Subdistrict, namely the Dongping County First People's Hospital and the Dongping County Mental Hospital. There was also a health center, the Zhoucheng Subdistrict Community Health Service Center, and more than 30 village-level health rooms or clinics.

Zhoucheng Subdistrict has one high school, Dongping No. 1 High School. In 2003, the school had 46 teaching classes with a total of 3,163 students. At the end of 2011, there were two junior high schools in Zhoucheng Subdistrict with 2,265 students, as well as 13 kindergartens. In 2018, Zhoucheng Subdistrict had five elementary schools with a total of 104 full-time elementary school teachers. The subdistrict also features various cultural facilities, including cultural stations, cultural centers, libraries, farmer night schools, and mutual aid institutions. Additionally, it has a broadcasting television station.

Within Zhoucheng Subdistrict's jurisdiction, there are three provincial-level roads: 255 Provincial Road, 250 Provincial Road, and 331 Provincial Road. Among them, Provincial Road 331 runs through Zhoucheng Subdistrict from east to west. The Jinan-Guangzhou Expressway and Jinyulu Railway also pass through the administrative area of Zhoucheng Subdistrict. Zhoucheng Subdistrict has achieved electricity access for every village, with an average electricity consumption of 205 kWh per person in 1993.

== Culture ==
Within the boundaries of Zhoucheng Subdistrict in Dongping County, there are county-level intangible cultural heritages, including local folk legends such as the legend of Zhoucheng and the legend of Guijingsi, as well as traditional arts like Du (杜) family clay sculptures, handmade paper cutting in the South Gate of Zhoucheng, and Shandong Kuaishu (a type of traditional narrative storytelling). Zhoucheng pancake, Dongping fermented fish, and Dongping porridge are famous local snacks in Zhoucheng. The techniques for making Zhoucheng pancakes and Dongping fermented fish have been listed as county-level intangible cultural heritages in Dongping County. "Shuai Er Gui" (摔二鬼) is a famous local folk art in Zhoucheng. Two fake figurines are placed on a wooden frame, and performers carry these figurines on their backs to demonstrate wrestling. This skill has been passed down for about two centuries and was included in the first batch of Tai'an city-level intangible cultural heritages in 2006.

In the Zhoucheng Subdistrict, some residents follow Christian and Islamic faiths. Within the city of Zhoucheng, there is an Islamic place of worship, namely the Zhoucheng Mosque. Protestant Christianity also has activity places in Guijingsi Village and Fenglou Village.

== Historic heritage and tourism ==
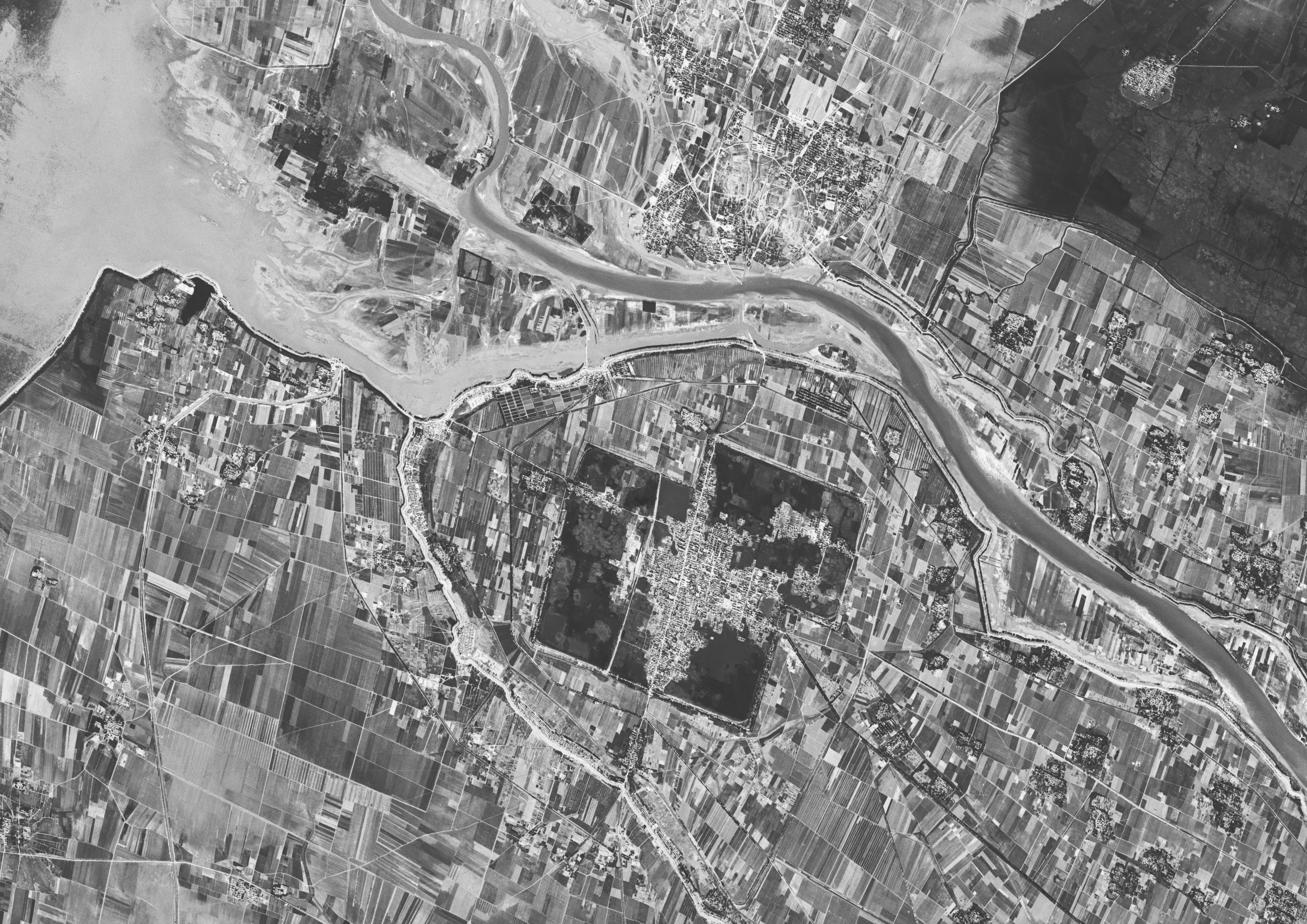
Satellite imagery of Dongping County and its surrounding areas in September 1971

Zhoucheng Subdistrict in Dongping County is noted for its rich cultural and historical heritage, which is actively preserved and promoted through various initiatives. One of its key cultural relics is the Zhoucheng Mosque, recognized as a city-level cultural relic protection unit in Tai'an. Additionally, there are three county-level cultural relic protection units: Yongji Bridge, a Ming dynasty bridge that remains in use; Zhoucheng Stone Carvings, which reflect the area's historical artistry; and the birthplace of the CCP's Work Committee, marking an important site in the early history of the Communist movement.

During the Song dynasty, Zhoucheng was initially built with earth fortifications, featuring six city gates. However, these fortifications were damaged at the end of the Yuan dynasty due to warfare. They were reconstructed during the Hongxi period of the Ming dynasty and again during the Qianlong period of the Qing dynasty, with the city wall rebuilt using bricks. In May 1945, after the CCP took control of Zhoucheng, they dismantled the city walls to prevent other forces from using them as strongholds. Today, there are no remnants of the original city walls or gates. The current Gongji Gate and Zhoucheng Subdistrict walls were reconstructed in modern times for tourism development. Historically, Zhoucheng had a significant number of buildings and cultural relics, including 72 archways, with notable examples being the Father-Son Top Scholars Arch and the Dragon Gate Leap Arch. The Father-Son Top Scholars Arch was built in honor of the rare father-son top scholars Liang Hao and Liang Gu during the Song dynasty. Originally made of wood, it was rebuilt with stone during the Qing dynasty. The Dragon Gate Leap Arch was built in honor of the Ming dynasty scholar Wu Zhi. Both archways were destroyed during the Cultural Revolution and have been reconstructed in modern times. There were originally over 20 ancient buildings within the city of Zhoucheng, including Guan Di Temple, Fire God Temple, Confucius Temple, and Magong Temple. However, most of these buildings were destroyed during warfare or the Cultural Revolution. Only a few, like the Zhoucheng Mosque and Guijingsi, have been preserved to this day. Outside the South Gate of Zhoucheng, there are two ancient bridges: Yongji Bridge, built during the Ming dynasty, and Nanmen Bridge, built during the Yuan dynasty. Both of these bridges are still in use today.

In 2011, the Dongping County Work Committee Memorial Hall was established at the former residence of Wan Li, where the precursor of the CCP's Dongping County Committee, the East Ping Work Committee, was founded in 1937.

For the development of tourism, Zhoucheng Subdistrict reconstructed parts of the city wall and city gates. They also constructed a 5-kilometer-long antique-style "Ten-Li Song Subdistrict", with over 30 cultural industry merchants along the street. Within the city, there are also antique trading markets and a Folk Stone Carving Museum. The Folk Stone Carving Museum houses over 100 stone tablets and carvings, while the Dongping Museum has collected more than 6,000 cultural relics within Zhoucheng Subdistrict. In recognition of its efforts in tourism and environmental beautification, Zhoucheng Subdistrict was honored as an environmentally beautiful town in Shandong Province in 2008 and was designated a strong tourist town by the Shandong Provincial Tourism Bureau in 2012.

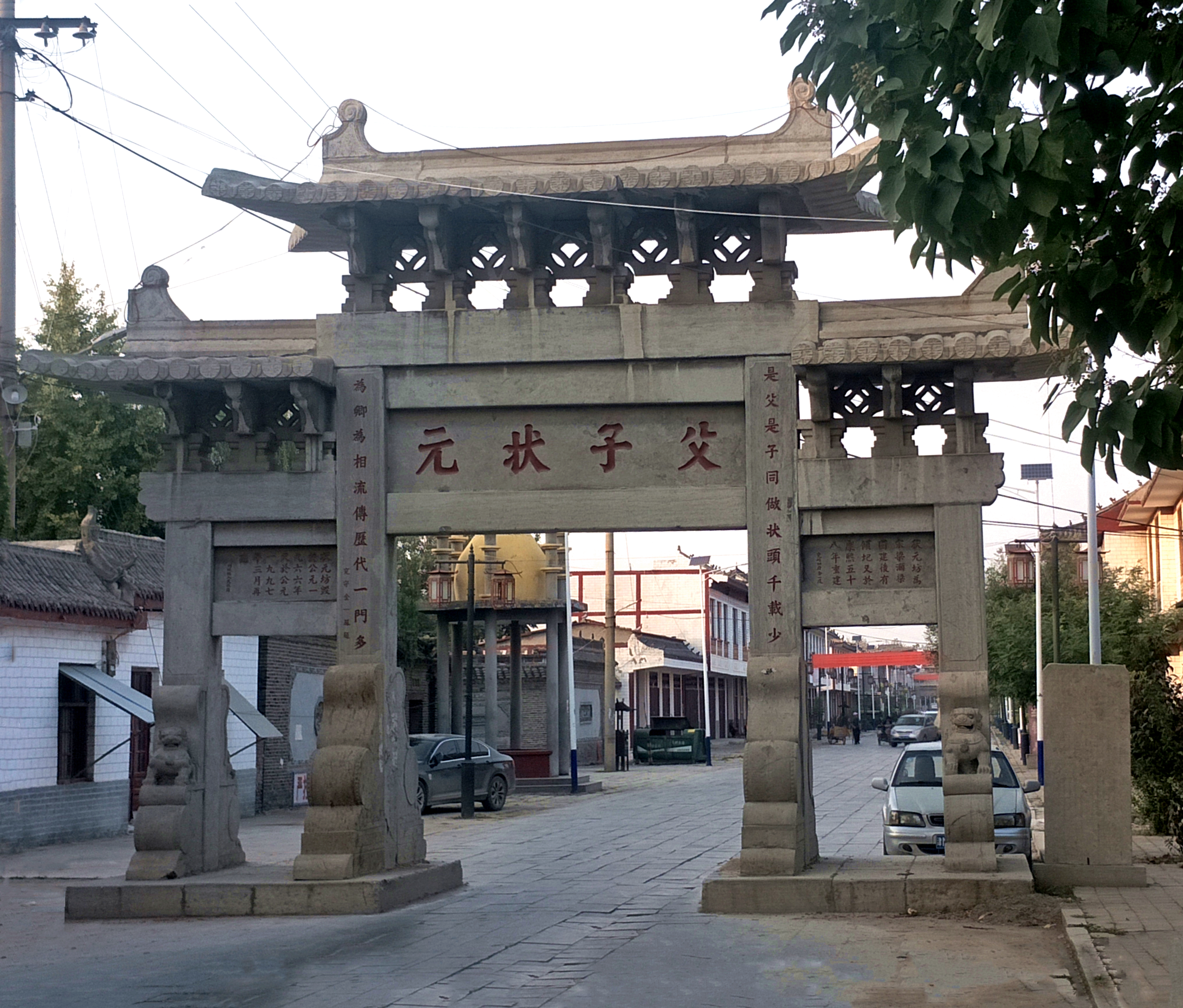
The "Father-Son Top Scholars Arch" was initially constructed during the Song dynasty, but it was later renovated into a stone arch during the Qing dynasty. Unfortunately, it suffered damage during the Cultural Revolution. The current archway was reconstructed in 1997.

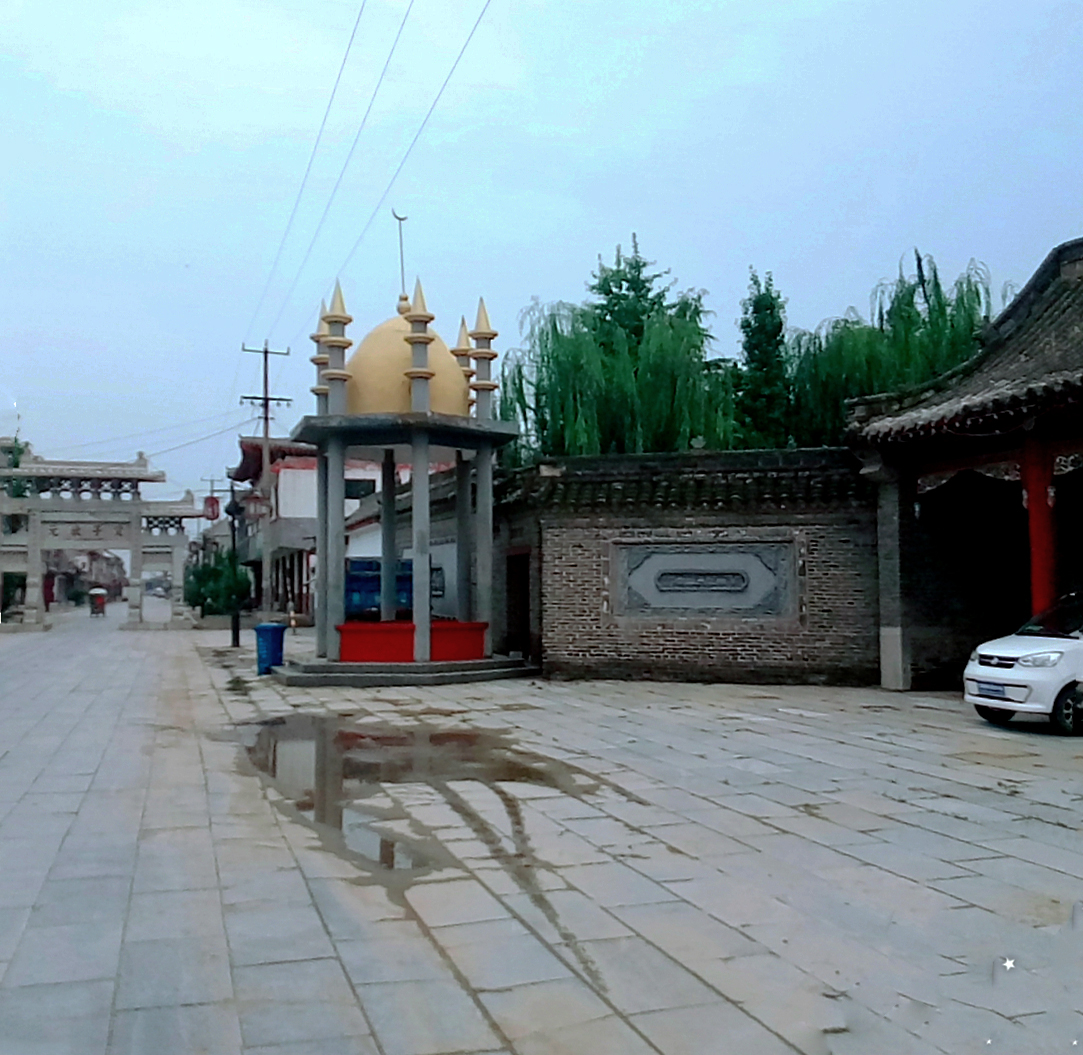
The Zhoucheng Mosque, also known as Dongping Mosque, was initially constructed during the Ming dynasty and is now a city-level cultural relic protection unit.

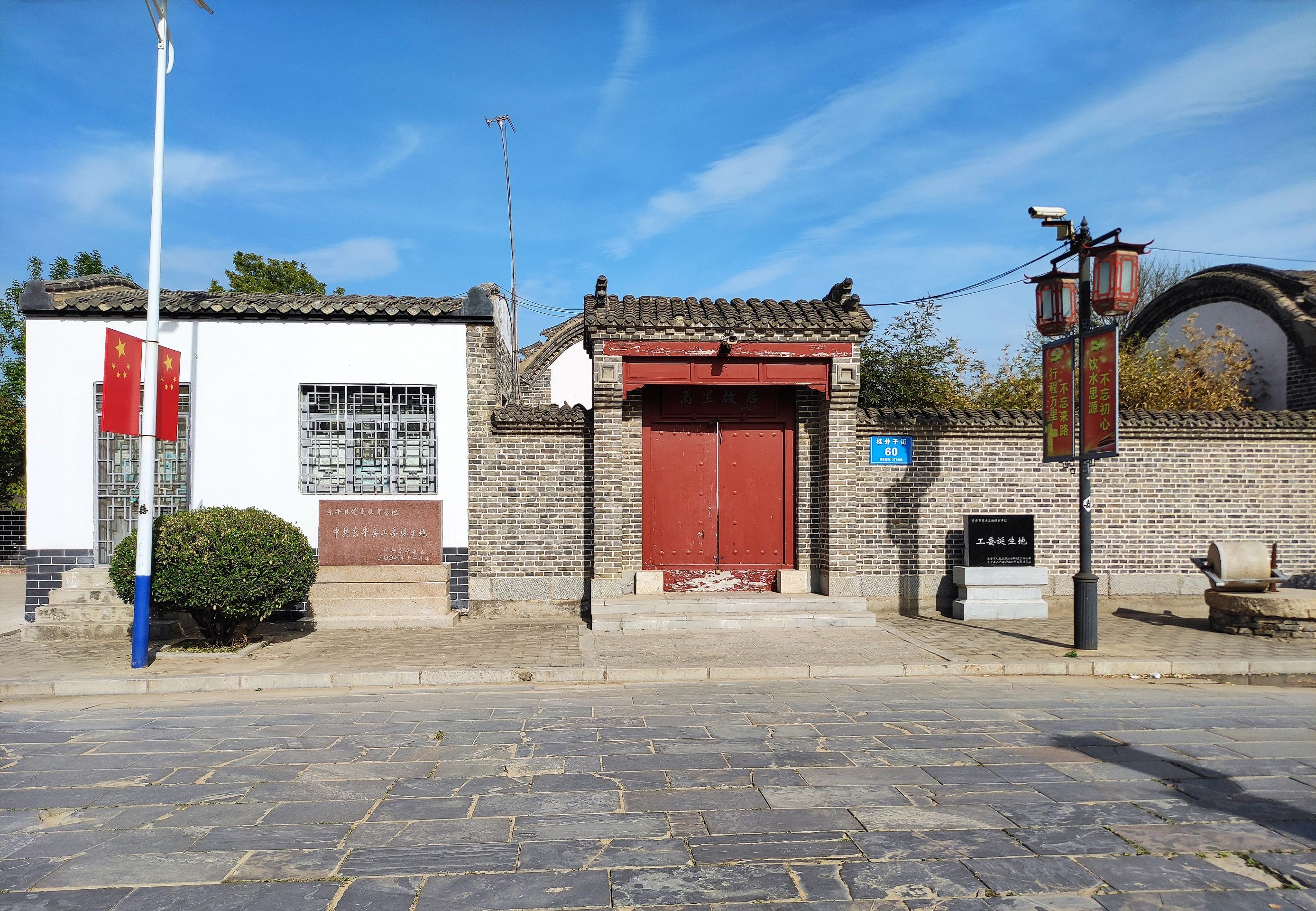
Wan Li's former residence, where the Dongping County Committee of the CCP was also established, is now a city-level cultural relic protection unit.

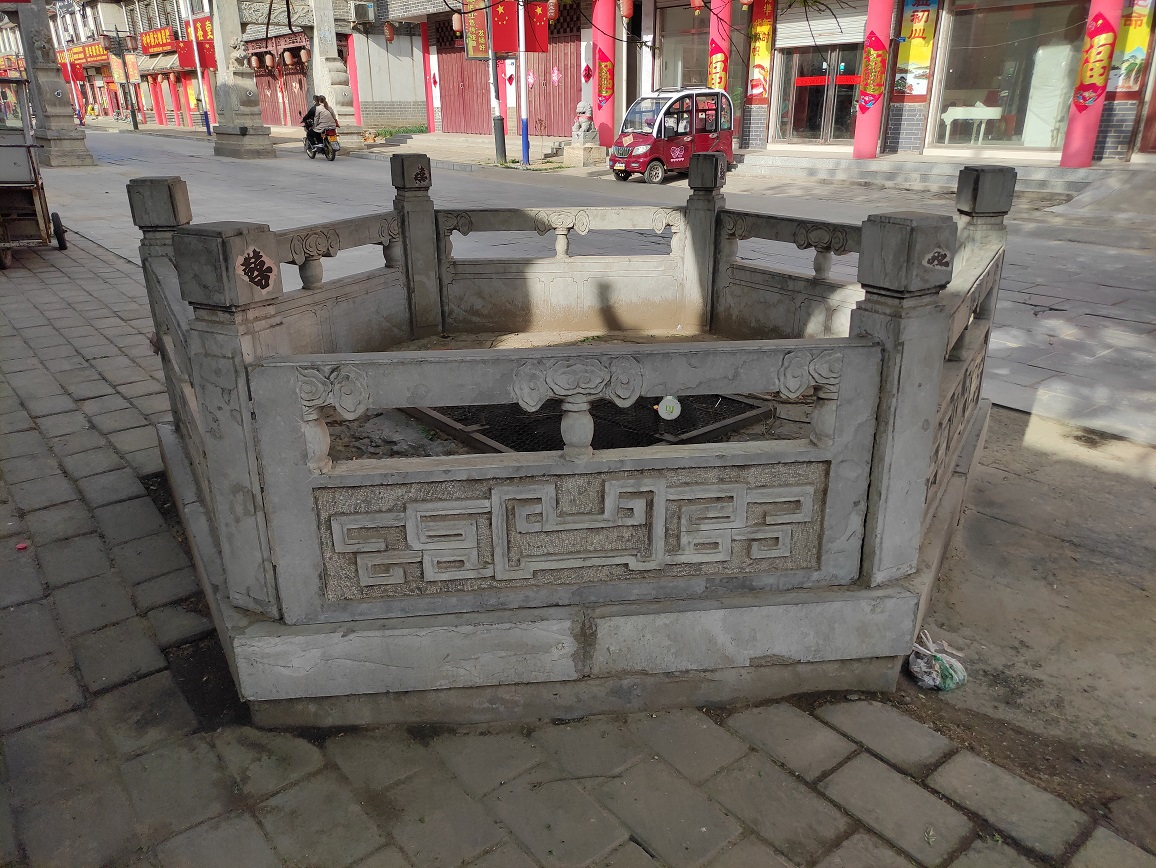
Guijingsi, it is said to have been established during the Jin dynasty.

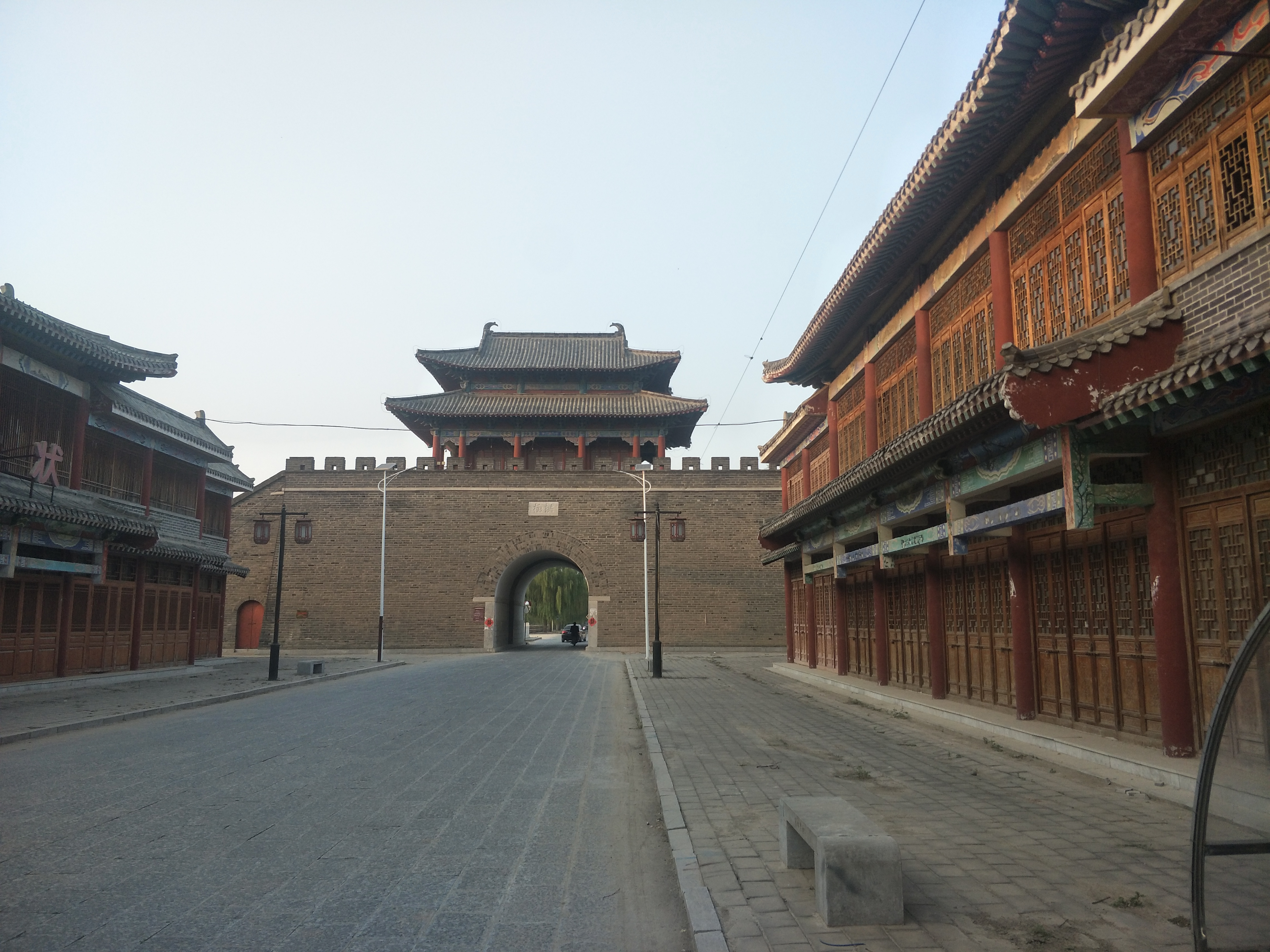
Shi-Li Song Street and the city gates of Zhoucheng. Zhoucheng was initially constructed in the year 1000 AD. However, it was dismantled after the Anti-Japanese War, and the city gates and walls shown in the image have all been reconstructed in modern times.
