= Liangshanpo nomenclature dispute =

Legal conflict in Shandong, China, 2006–2009

The dispute over the nomenclature of Liangshanpo occurred from 2006 to 2009 and was a contentious clash between the Scenic Area Management Committee and the Tourism Corporation of Liangshan County, situated within the province of Shandong, China and the Liangshanpo Tourism Development Co., Ltd. of Dongping County, also in Shandong Province. The former party initiated legal proceedings against the latter, culminating in two rounds of judicial scrutiny. The case concluded when Liangshan County prevailed in its lawsuit.

== Background ==
Dongping County and Liangshan County are situated in the southwestern region of Shandong Province, lagging behind in economic development within the province. Both counties serve as the backdrop for the tales of Water Margin, one of the most famous works of Chinese literature, thus making "Water Margin tourism" a focal point of their respective tourism development. The competition between them in promoting Water Margin tourism laid the ground for future friction between the two counties.

Dongping Lake, located in the western part of Dongping County is the second-largest lake in Shandong Province, regarded as a vestige of Mount Liang's (Liangshanpo) marshes. Initially, the western shores of Dongping Lake belonged to Liangshan County, while the eastern shores belonged to Dongping County. Dongping Lake was jointly administered by both counties. However, in December 1985, for the sake of administrative convenience, a town and eight townships near Dongping Lake, previously under the jurisdiction of Liangshan County, were transferred to Dongping County. Consequently, Dongping County assumed sole management of Dongping Lake, leaving Liangshan County in the awkward predicament of "having the mountain but lacking the water" in relation to Mount Liang.

In early 2001, Dongping County renamed Tushan Island, situated at the heart of Dongping Lake, to Juyi Island and embarked on its development.

In September 2001, the counties of Yanggu, Yuncheng, Liangshan, and Dongping convened a meeting to discuss collaborative development of Water Margin tourism. However, due to loose cooperation, tangible outcomes were not effectively achieved.

== Process ==
=== Renaming controversy ===
In 2004, the director of Shandong SunRise Environmental Technology Co., Ltd. was invited by the Dongping County Government to conduct an investigation of Dongping Lake. Subsequently, discussions were held with the county government, leading to a decision to develop the tourism resources of Dongping Lake.

On April 28, 2004, Shandong SunRise Environmental Technology Co., Ltd. was officially registered as "Shandong Liangshanpo Tourism Development Co., Ltd." and the relevant trademarks for the "Liangshanpo" tourism project were obtained.

On April 26, 2006, Liangshanpo Tourism Development Co., Ltd. acquired the complete operational, managerial, and development rights for a period of forty years for the "Former Liangshan" area, which revolved around Lashan National Forest Park, including Lashan, Kunshan, Jinshan, Liugongshan, and Woniu Mountain. This marked the beginning of a large-scale development phase for the 76-square-kilometer Water Margin cultural tourism area.

In June 2006, Liangshanpo Tourism Development Co., Ltd. renamed Lashan, Liugongshan, and Dongping Lake to "Former Liangshan," "Northern Liangshan," and "Liangshanpo" in their tickets, advertisements, and tourism signage. Subsequently, the Liangshan County Government issued a request titled "Request from the Liangshan County Government to Immediately Cease the Illegitimate Acts of Shandong Liangshanpo Tourism Development Co., Ltd. in Usurping Our County's Naming Rights," demanding the cessation of the naming infringement and proclaiming their intention to employ legal means to protect their rights.

In mid-September 2006, the Tourism Bureaus of Liangshan County and Dongping County made contact, with the hope that the counterpart would instruct Liangshanpo Tourism Development Co., Ltd. to cease using terms such as "Liangshan" and "Liangshanpo" in their promotional materials. However, the Dongping County Tourism Bureau declined this request, claiming that it is not appropriate for the government to interfere with the business operations of enterprises.

On October 9, 2006, the Department of Civil Affairs of Shandong Province issued an "opinion" to the Civil Affairs Bureau of Tai'an City. The opinion stated that "Shandong Dongping County Liangshanpo Tourism Development Co., Ltd., in their advertising and promotion, used non-standard place names such as 'Former Liangshan' and 'Northern Liangshan' without government approval. Therefore, corrective measures must be taken."

=== Litigation ===
Towards the end of October 2006, the Liangshan County Tourism Corporation and the Liangshan County Scenic Area Management Committee, acting as joint plaintiffs, brought a lawsuit against the Shandong Dongping County Liangshanpo Tourism Development Co., Ltd., and the Rencheng Travel Agency in Jining City. The lawsuit was filed on the grounds of unfair competition and false advertising, seeking a compensation of 1.5 million yuan.

In November, Shandong Liangshanpo Tourism Development Company raised an objection to the jurisdiction.

On December 11, the Intermediate People's Court of Jining City issued a ruling, dismissing the jurisdictional objection raised by Shandong Liangshanpo Tourism Development Company.

In July 2007, the Intermediate People's Court of Jining City delivered a first-instance judgment, ruling against the defendant, Liangshanpo Tourism Development Co., Ltd. They demanded an immediate cessation of use of the terms "Liangshan" and "Liangshanpo" and ordered the defendant to compensate the plaintiffs with 500,000 yuan.

In August, Liangshanpo Tourism Development Company, dissatisfied with the ruling, filed an appeal.

On December 15, 2008, the Supreme People's Court of Shandong Province issued the final verdict in this case, affirming the original judgment.

On May 19, 2009, the Liangshan Scenic Area Management Committee and the Liangshan County Tourism Corporation received judgment from the Provincial High People's Court. This three-year-long battle over the place names finally came to a conclusive end.

== Subsequent developments ==
Shortly thereafter, the Liangshanpo Tourism Development Co., Ltd. was deregistered, putting an end to the dispute between Dongping County and Liangshan County. In 2010, the counties and cities along the Water Margin story route, including Dongping County and Liangshan County, jointly applied for World Heritage status for the Water Margin story. On May 26, 2014, the Liangshanpo Plain Reservoir was completed, changing the situation of "mountains without water" in Liangshan. Subsequently, Liangshan County directly renamed the Liangshanpo Plain Reservoir to Liangshanpo on maps. Currently, both the Liangshan Water Margin Scenic Area in Liangshan County and the Dongping Lake Scenic Area in Dongping County are striving to become 5A-level tourist attractions.

== See also ==
- Liangshan Lake
- Dongpin Lake
- Anshan Lake
