= Liangshan =

Liangshan may refer to the following places in China and Korea:

- Liangshan Yi Autonomous Prefecture (凉山彝族自治州), Sichuan
- Liangshan County (梁山县), Shandong
- Mount Liang (梁山), a mountain in Shandong, well known for Water Margin
- Liangping County, Chongqing, formerly Liangshan County, Sichuan
- Liangshan, Jiangxi (良山镇), town in Yushui District, Xinyu
- Liangshan, Liaoning (梁山镇), town in Xinmin, Liaoning
- Liangshan, Shaanxi (梁山镇), town in Qian County
- Liangshan, Shandong (梁山镇), town in and seat of Liangshan County
- Yangsan (梁山市), South Gyeongsang Province
