= Yun Prefecture (Shandong) =

Historical administrative division in Shandong, China

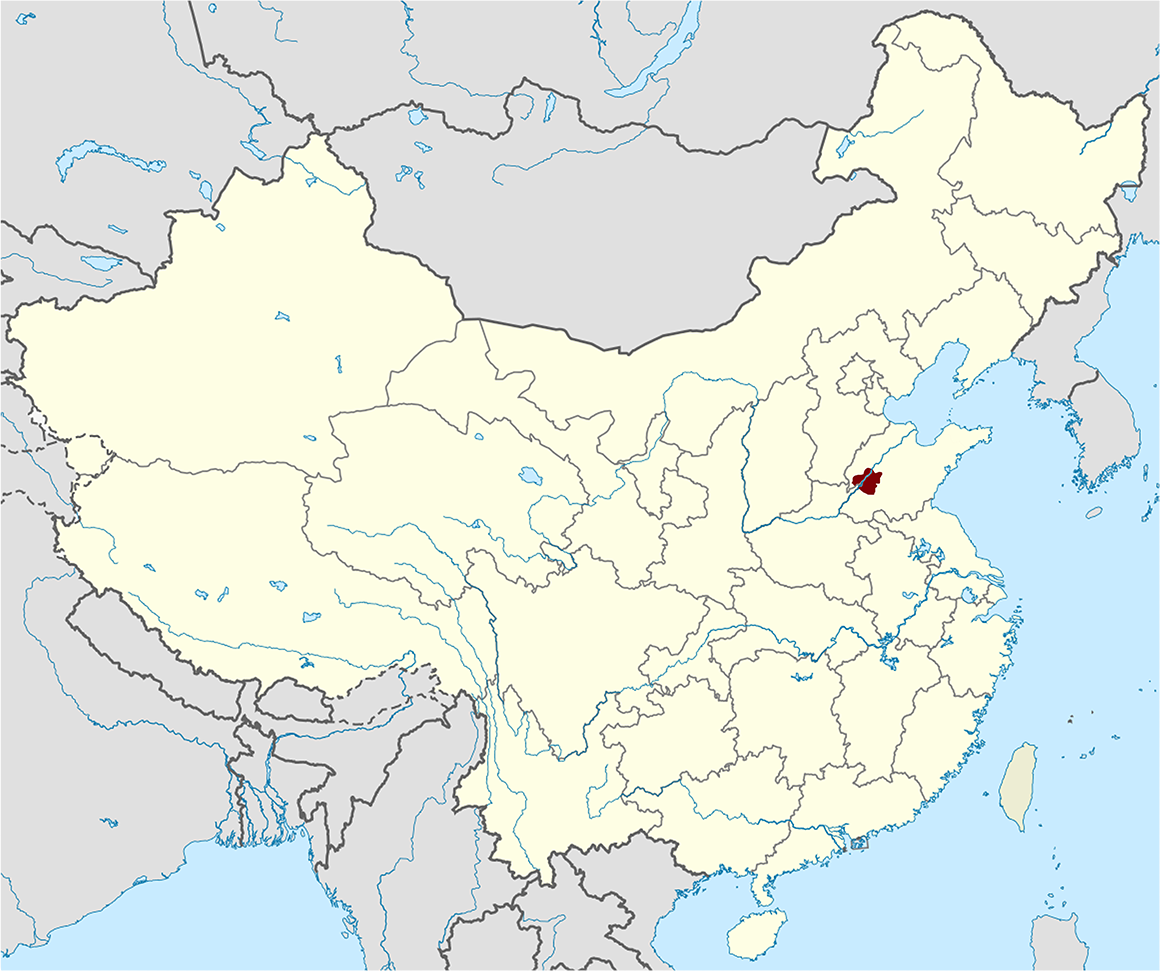
- Traditional Chinese: 鄆州
- Simplified Chinese: 郓州
Transcriptions
Standard Mandarin
- Hanyu Pinyin: Yùn Zhōu
- Wade–Giles: Yün^{4} Chou^{1}

Yunzhou or Yun Prefecture was a zhou (prefecture) in imperial China in modern southwestern Shandong, China. It existed (intermittently) from 590 to 1109.

== Geography ==
During the Sui dynasty it was seated in modern Yuncheng County, but since 634 the seat was moved northeastwards to modern Dongping County.

In the Tang dynasty its administrative area probably includes of parts of modern:

- Under the administration of Heze
  - Yuncheng County
  - Juye County
- Under the administration of Jining
  - Liangshan County
- Under the administration of Tai'an
  - Dongping County
- Under the administration of Jinan
  - Pingyin County
  - Changqing District (Jinan)
- Under the administration of Liaocheng
  - Yanggu County
  - Dong'e County
