= Weishi =

Weishi may refer to:

- Weishi County, in Henan, China
- Weishi rockets, Chinese weapons systems
- Cheng Weishi Lun, comprehensive commentary on Vasubandhu's seminal Yogacara work Triṃśikā-vijñaptimātratā
- Yogacara, or Wei Shi in Chinese, a school of Buddhist philosophy and psychology emphasizing phenomenology and ontology
