= Pengji Subdistrict =

Pengji 彭集街道
- Subdistrict
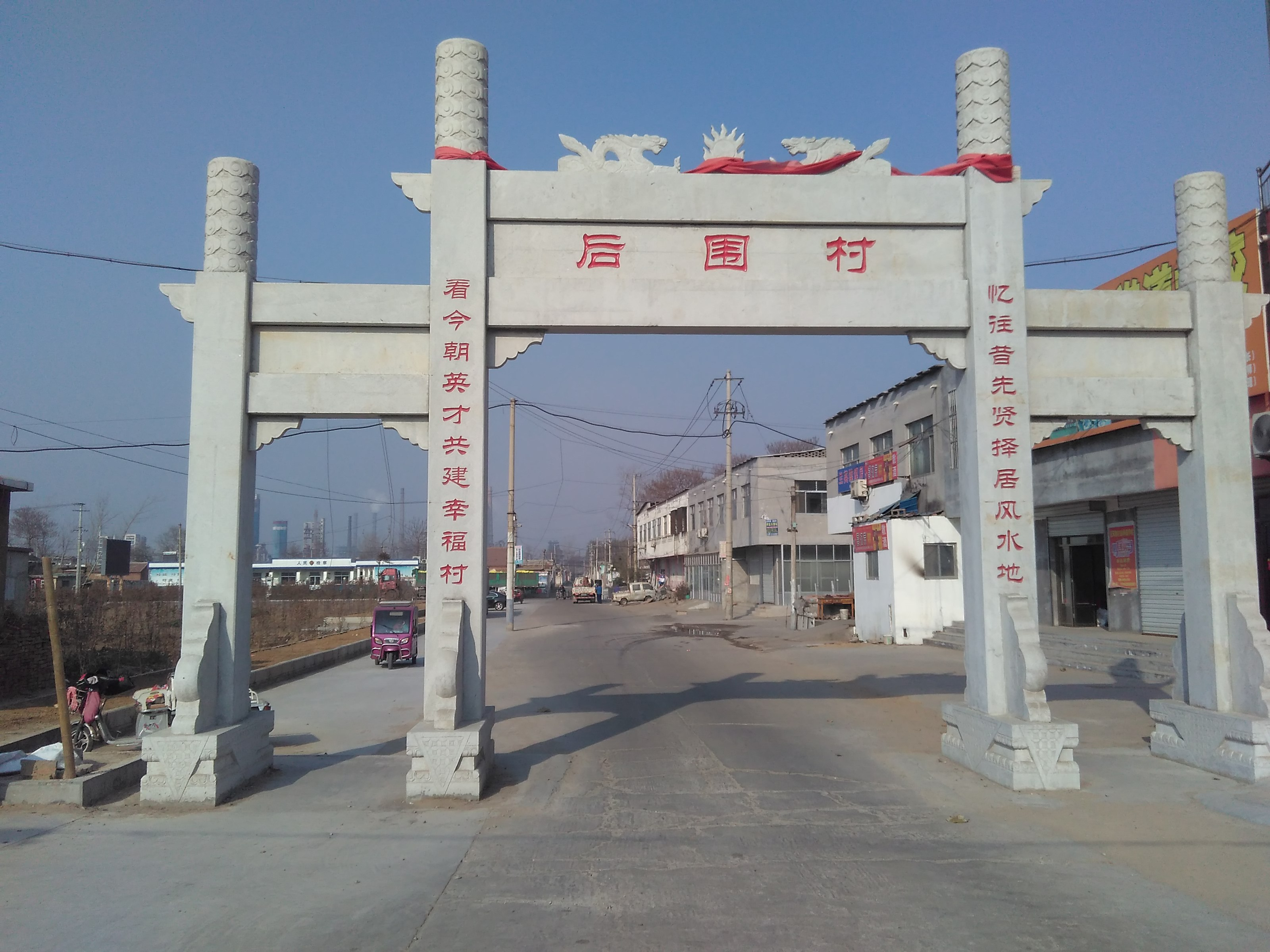
- Houwei Village

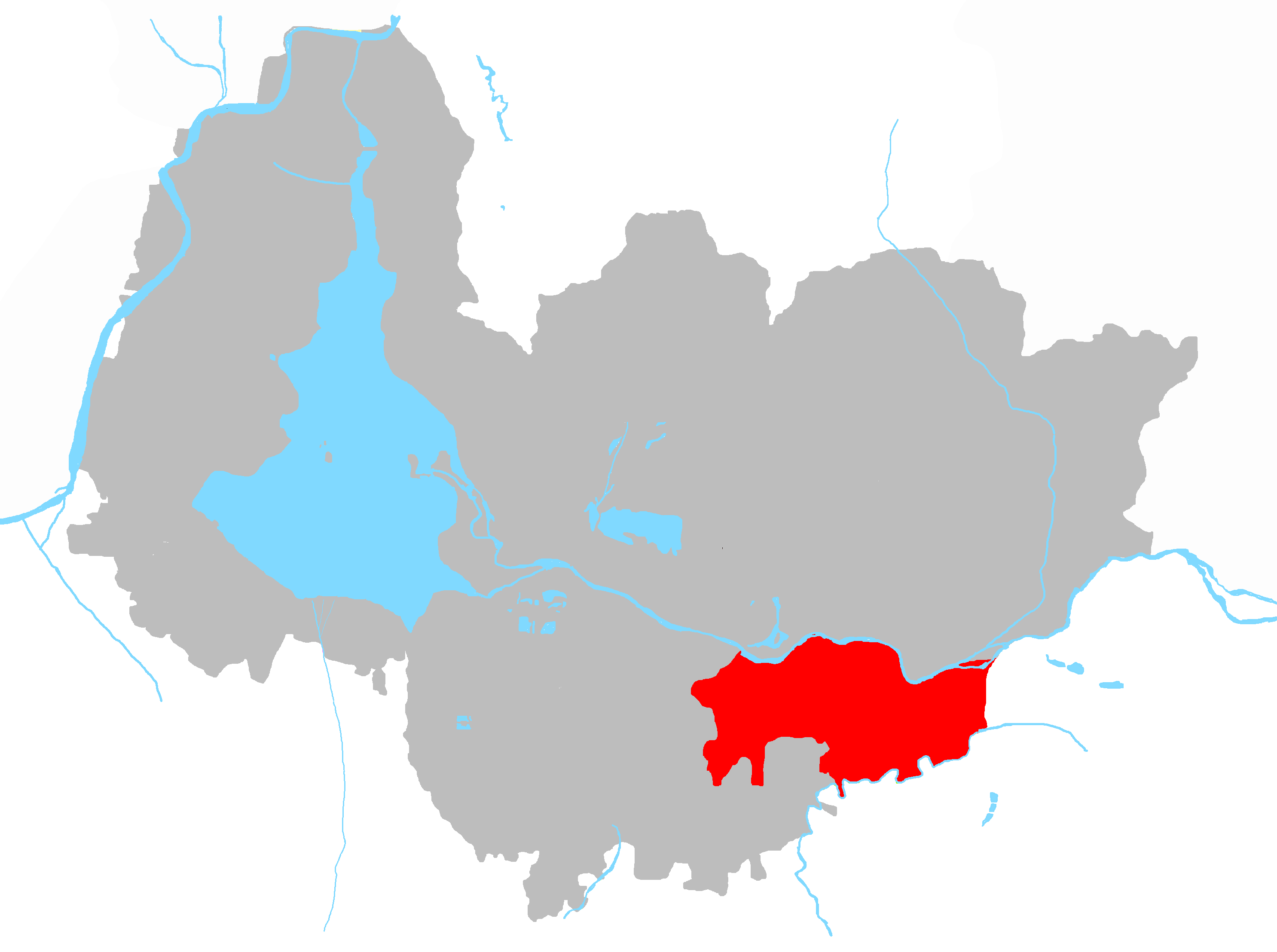
- Location in Dongping County

- Location in Shandong
- Coordinates: 35°51′42″N 116°27′43″E
- Country: People's Republic of China
- Province: Shandong
- Prefecture-level city: Tai'an
- County: Dongping County
- Area code: 0538

Pengji Subdistrict (Chinese: 彭集街道; pinyin: Péngjí Jiēdào) is a subdistrict in the southeastern part of Dongping County, Shandong Province, China.

== Administration ==
Pengji Subdistrict has jurisdiction over the following administrative villages:

Péngjí Village, Chàhémén Village, Hòuwéi Village, Sānyìzhuāng Village, Luánmiào Village, Xiǎomèng Village, Wángzhuāng Village, Xiǎoliúzhuāng Village, Dàmèng Village, West Shǐzhuāng Village, East Shǐzhuāng Village, East Guōzhuāng Village, Féngzhuāng Village, Péizhài Village, Yuánlóu Village, West Guōzhuāng Village, South Chéngzi Village, Houdài Village, Qiándài Village, Dàijiā Village, Mǎdài Village, Lǚmiào Village, Hémùzhuāng Village, Lǚlóu Village, Liúwángzhuāng Village, Dà-Gāozhuāng Village, Xiǎo-Gāozhuāng Village, Hòutíng Village, Lónggù Village, hòuhǎi Village, Qiánhǎi Village, Yuánhǎi Village, An Village, Shàng-Liúzé Village, Chén-Liúzé Village, Mǎ-Liúzé Village, Sūn-Liúzé Village, Wěizihé Village, Liǔyíng Village, East Liáng Village, Chángzhuāng Village, Wángquān Village, Cáomiào Village, Dōnglǐlóu Village, Chéng Village, Zhàolóu Village, Lǐhǎi Village, Xiǎoniú Village, Lǔtún Village, Dà-Niú Village, North Zhāngquān Village, Chénquān Village, Xiezhuāng Village.

== See also ==
- Zhoucheng Subdistrict
