= Shixia, Gansu =

Shixia 石峡镇
- Town
- Location in Gansu
- Coordinates: 33°47′1″N 105°23′9″E
- Country: People's Republic of China
- Province: Gansu
- Prefecture-level city: Longnan
- County: Xihe County

Population (2019)
  - Total: 11,085
- Time zone: UTC+8 (China Standard)

Shixia (simplified Chinese: 石峡; traditional Chinese: 石峽; pinyin: Shíxiá) is a town of Xihe County, Gansu, China. As of 2018, it has 14 villages under its administration. It is one of the poorest villages in Xihe, most of its population of 11,085 people relies on farming.
