= Guguantun =

Coordinates: 36°20′N 116°10′E

Guguantun 顾官屯镇
- Town
- Interactive map of Guguantun
- Country: People's Republic of China
- Province: Shandong
- Prefecture-level city: Liaocheng
- County: Dong'e
- Time zone: UTC+8 (China Standard)

Guguantun (Chinese: 顾官屯镇) is a town in Dong'e County, Liaocheng, in western Shandong province, China.
