= Gaoji =

Gaoji 高集镇
- Town
- Location in Shandong Gaoji (China)
- Coordinates: 36°27′36″N 116°22′27″E
- Country: People's Republic of China
- Province: Shandong
- Prefecture-level city: Liaocheng
- County: Dong'e
- Time zone: UTC+8 (China Standard)

Gaoji (Chinese: 高集镇) is a town in Dong'e County, Liaocheng, in western Shandong province, China.
