= Xihe County =

Xihe County 西和县
- County
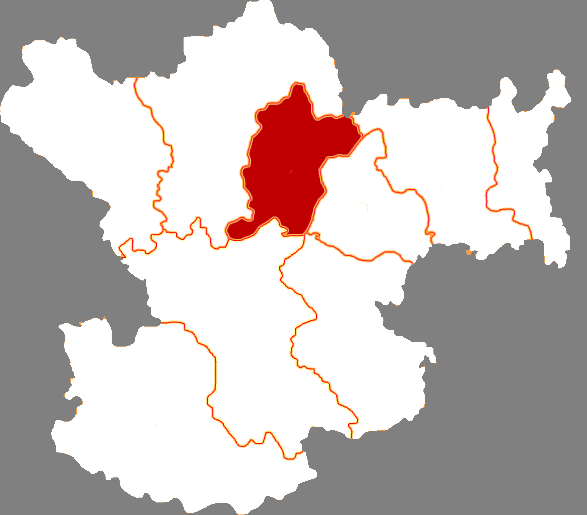
- Xihe in Longnan

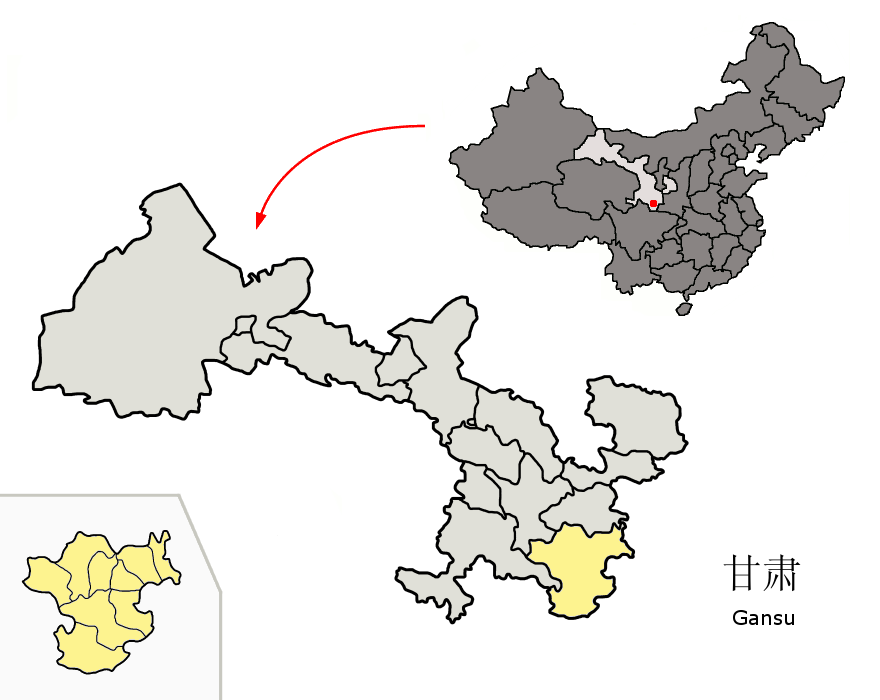
- Longnan in Gansu
- Coordinates: 34°00′51″N 105°17′56″E
- Country: China
- Province: Gansu
- Prefecture-level city: Longnan
- County seat: Hanyuan

Area
  - Total: 1,861 km^{2} (719 sq mi)
- Elevation: 1,692 m (5,551 ft)

Population (2014)
  - Total: 428,400
  - Density: 230.2/km^{2} (596.2/sq mi)
- Time zone: UTC+8 (China Standard)
- Postal code: 742100
- Website: www.xihe.gov.cn

Xihe County (Chinese: 西和县; pinyin: Xīhé Xiàn) is a county under the administration of the prefecture-level city of Longnan, in the southeast of Gansu Province of China. The postal code is 742500. The county seat is located in the town of Hanyuan (汉源镇).

In 2014 the population was 432,400.

== History ==
Archeological finds from the Yangshao culture have been found in Xihe. During the Qin state era, the area was used to raise horses. During the Sui dynasty the county of Changdao was established in present-day Xihe During the Northern Song dynasty the name was changed to Minzhou. After the Song and Jin dynasty signed a peace treaty, the name was changed to Hezhou, since Min was also the name of the Jin emperor. To avoid confusion with He County in Anhui, the name later was changed to Xihe.

== Administrative divisions ==
Xihe County is divided to 16 towns and 4 townships.

Towns

- Hanyuan (汉源镇)
- Changdao (长道镇)
- Heba (何坝镇)
- Jiangxi (姜席镇)
- Shixia (石峡镇)
- Luoyu (洛峪镇)
- Xiyu (西峪镇)
- Mayuan (马元镇)
- Daqiao (大桥镇)
- Shili (十里镇)
- Shibao (石堡镇)
- Xinglong (兴隆镇)
- Suhe (苏合镇)
- Luhe (卢河镇)
- Shaoyu (稍峪镇)
- Xigaoshan (西高山镇)

Townships

- Shajing Township (晒经乡)
- Haolin Township (蒿林乡)
- Taishihe Township (太石河乡)
- Liuxiang Township (六巷乡)

== Climate ==
Climate data for Xihe, elevation 1,579 m (5,180 ft), (1991–2020 normals, extremes 1981–2010)
Month	Jan	Feb	Mar	Apr	May	Jun	Jul	Aug	Sep	Oct	Nov	Dec	Year
Record high °C (°F)	15.3 (59.5)	19.0 (66.2)	26.3 (79.3)	30.0 (86.0)	31.2 (88.2)	32.6 (90.7)	33.7 (92.7)	32.5 (90.5)	32.0 (89.6)	24.3 (75.7)	20.1 (68.2)	17.2 (63.0)	33.7 (92.7)
Mean daily maximum °C (°F)	3.0 (37.4)	5.9 (42.6)	11.3 (52.3)	17.5 (63.5)	21.3 (70.3)	24.6 (76.3)	26.6 (79.9)	25.6 (78.1)	20.2 (68.4)	14.8 (58.6)	9.7 (49.5)	4.5 (40.1)	15.4 (59.8)
Daily mean °C (°F)	−2.9 (26.8)	0.4 (32.7)	5.3 (41.5)	10.9 (51.6)	14.9 (58.8)	18.4 (65.1)	20.8 (69.4)	19.9 (67.8)	15.4 (59.7)	9.9 (49.8)	4.1 (39.4)	−1.5 (29.3)	9.6 (49.3)
Mean daily minimum °C (°F)	−7.1 (19.2)	−3.5 (25.7)	0.7 (33.3)	5.5 (41.9)	9.5 (49.1)	13.2 (55.8)	16.0 (60.8)	15.6 (60.1)	11.9 (53.4)	6.4 (43.5)	0.2 (32.4)	−5.7 (21.7)	5.2 (41.4)
Record low °C (°F)	−19.1 (−2.4)	−15.9 (3.4)	−11.7 (10.9)	−7.4 (18.7)	−1.0 (30.2)	3.6 (38.5)	7.0 (44.6)	6.4 (43.5)	0.9 (33.6)	−7.3 (18.9)	−14.1 (6.6)	−21.3 (−6.3)	−21.3 (−6.3)
Average precipitation mm (inches)	6.9 (0.27)	8.9 (0.35)	21.9 (0.86)	40.4 (1.59)	61.1 (2.41)	70.4 (2.77)	89.1 (3.51)	85.1 (3.35)	77.0 (3.03)	51.2 (2.02)	11.8 (0.46)	3.7 (0.15)	527.5 (20.77)
Average precipitation days (≥ 0.1 mm)	7.3	7.6	9.0	9.4	12.0	12.4	12.0	11.4	13.5	12.6	6.6	4.2	118
Average snowy days	12.1	10.6	6.3	1.1	0.1	0	0	0	0	0.7	3.8	7.5	42.2
Average relative humidity (%)	68	68	67	64	67	71	74	76	80	80	76	69	72
Mean monthly sunshine hours	144.1	122.5	149.7	175.4	188.7	168.7	184.1	176.3	110.2	108.2	124.6	147.8	1,800.3
Percentage possible sunshine	46	39	40	44	44	39	42	43	30	31	40	48	41
Source: China Meteorological Administration

== Economy ==
Xihe has a mainly agricultural economy, crops include Chinese medicinal plants – particularly pinellia, potatoes, forestry and fruits.

== Culture ==
The Qiqiao Festival celebrations in Xihe were included as national intangible cultural heritage.
