= Niujiaodian =

Niujiaodian 牛角店镇
- Town
- Location in Shandong Niujiaodian (China)
- Coordinates: 36°23′55″N 116°26′09″E
- Country: People's Republic of China
- Province: Shandong
- Prefecture-level city: Liaocheng
- County: Dong'e
- Time zone: UTC+8 (China Standard)

Niujiaodian (Chinese: 牛角店镇) is a town in Dong'e County, Liaocheng, in western Shandong province, China.
