= Yaozhai =

Yaozhai 姚寨镇
- Town
- Location in Shandong Yaozhai (China)
- Coordinates: 36°22′21″N 116°21′25″E
- Country: People's Republic of China
- Province: Shandong
- Prefecture-level city: Liaocheng
- County: Dong'e
- Time zone: UTC+8 (China Standard)

Yaozhai (Chinese: 姚寨镇) is a town in Dong'e County, Liaocheng, in western Shandong province, China.
