= Liuji, Shandong =

Liuji 刘集镇
- Town
- Location in Shandong Liuji (China)
- Coordinates: 36°12′54″N 116°07′35″E
- Country: People's Republic of China
- Province: Shandong
- Prefecture-level city: Liaocheng
- County: Dong'e
- Elevation: 39 m (128 ft)
- Time zone: UTC+8 (China Standard)
- Area code: 0635

Liuji (simplified Chinese: 刘集; traditional Chinese: 劉集; pinyin: Liújí) is a town in Dong'e County in western Shandong province, China, located less than 6 kilometres (3.7 mi) northwest of the Yellow River and 17 km (11 mi) southwest of the county seat. As of 2011, it has 85 villages under its administration.

== See also ==
- List of township-level divisions of Shandong
