= Jiangxi, Gansu =

Jiangxi 姜席镇
- Town
- Location in Gansu
- Coordinates: 33°59′56″N 105°12′6″E
- Country: People's Republic of China
- Province: Gansu
- Prefecture-level city: Longnan
- County: Xihe County

Area
  - Total: 79.2 km^{2} (30.6 sq mi)
- Elevation: 1,700 m (5,600 ft)

Population
  - Total: 29,031
  - Density: 367/km^{2} (949/sq mi)
- Time zone: UTC+8 (China Standard)

Jiangxi (Chinese: 姜席; pinyin: Jiāngxí) is a town of Xihe County in southeastern Gansu province, China. Its population is 29,031. As of 2020, it has 30 villages under its administration:

- Fenggou Village (冯沟村)
- Shanghu Village (上胡村)
- Xiahu Village (下胡村)
- Yangwan Village (杨湾村)
- Mayao Village (马窑村)
- Zhaohe Village (赵河村)
- Jiyao Village (姬窑村)
- Fengping Village (峰坪村)
- Xiezhuang Village (谢庄村)
- Qinggou Village (青沟村)
- Dongpu Village (董堡村)
- Dongpo Village (董坡村)
- Jiangyao Village (姜窑村)
- Lishan Village (李山村)
- Fugou Village (富沟村)
- Duanji Village (段集村)
- Jiaoshan Village (角善村)
- Shanping Village (山坪村)
- Jiangchuan Village (姜川村)
- Situ Village (四图村)
- Pengsi Village (彭寺村)
- Caogou Village (曹沟村)
- Xichuan Village (席川村)
- Zhangshan Village (张山村)
- Maping Village (马坪村)
- Magou Village (马沟村)
- Xifan Village (西番村)
- Maji Village (马集村)
- Beizhuangke Village (北庄科村)
- Xiwangji Village (西王集村)
