= Daqiao, Nanbu County =

Daqiao 大桥镇
- Town
- Location in Sichuan
- Coordinates: 31°21′48″N 105°46′45″E
- Country: People's Republic of China
- Province: Sichuan
- Prefecture-level city: Nanchong
- County: Nanbu
- Elevation: 392 m (1,286 ft)
- Time zone: UTC+8 (China Standard)
- Area code: 0817

Daqiao (simplified Chinese: 大桥; traditional Chinese: 大橋; pinyin: Dàqiáo; lit. 'great or large bridge') is a town of Nanbu County in northeastern Sichuan province, China, located 25 km (16 mi) west of the county seat. As of 2018, it has one residential community (社区) and 15 villages under its administration.

== See also ==
- List of township-level divisions of Sichuan
