= Daqiaotou =

Daqiaotou may refer to:

- Daqiaotou metro station, a metro station of the Taipei Metro.
- Daqiaotou Township (大桥头乡), a township in Changshan County, the prefecture-level city of Quzhou, Zhejiang Province, People's Republic of China.
- Daqiaotou Village (大桥头村), a village in Qianliu Yi Ethnic Township, Lancang Lahu Autonomous County, Yunnan, People's Republic of China.
- Daqiaotou Village (大桥头村), a village in Jinxiang, Zhejiang, People's Republic of China.
- Daqiaotou Village (大桥头村), a village in Xinshi, You County, Hunan province, People's Republic of China.
