= Nanbu County =

Nanbu County 南部县
- County
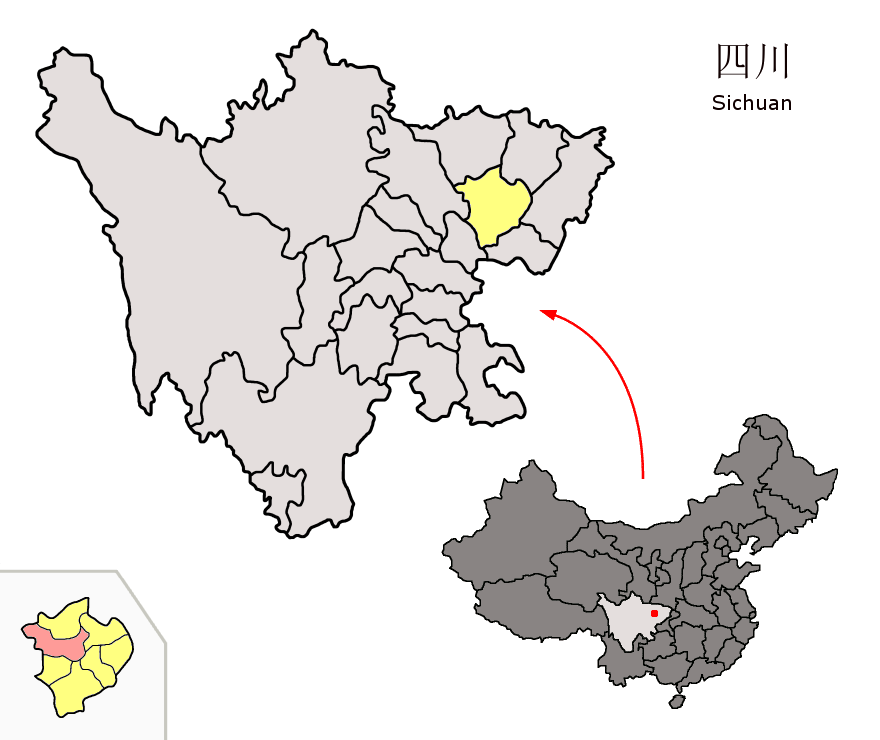
- Location of Nanbu County (red) within Nanchong City (yellow) and Sichuan

- Location of county seat Nanbu (China)
- Coordinates: 31°21′16″N 106°3′55″E
- Country: China
- Province: Sichuan
- Prefecture-level city: Nanchong
- County seat: Nanlong

Area
  - Total: 2,305 km^{2} (890 sq mi)

Population (2020 census)
  - Total: 817,235
  - Density: 354.5/km^{2} (918.3/sq mi)
- Time zone: UTC+8 (China Standard)

Nanbu County (Chinese: 南部县; pinyin: Nánbù Xiàn) is a county of Sichuan Province, China. It is under the administration of Nanchong city.

== History ==
In 1960, local government officials tasked with cleaning up Qing-dynasty archives found 4000 Qing-era official documents in a watchtower of the county's public security bureau, covering political, economic, military, cultural, educational, judicial, religious, and diplomatic records of the years 1656 to 1911. It is one of the largest surviving collections of Qing-era judicial material. The archives are nowadays stored by the Nanchong Municipal Bureau of Archives.

== Administrative divisions ==
Nanbu County comprises 4 subdistricts, 33 towns and 5 townships:

Subdistricts

- Binjiang (滨江街道)
- Shubei (蜀北街道)
- Manfu (满福街道)
- Nanlong (南隆街道)

Towns

- Laoya (老鸦镇)
- Yongding (永定镇)
- Beiyuan (碑院镇)
- Xiehe (谢河镇)
- Panlong (盘龙镇)
- Tiefotang (铁佛塘镇)
- Shihe (石河镇)
- Wangjia (王家镇)
- Fuli (富利镇)
- Nanmu (楠木镇)
- Changping (长坪镇)
- Dongba (东坝镇)
- Heba (河坝镇)
- Dingshui (定水镇)
- Dawang (大王镇)
- Huangjin (黄金镇)
- Liuma (流马镇)
- Jianxing (建兴镇)
- Sanguan (三官镇)
- Fuhu (伏虎镇)
- Shuangfo (双佛镇)
- Huaguan (花罐镇)
- Daqiao (大桥镇)
- Dahe (大河镇)
- Wannian (万年镇)
- Shengzhong (升钟镇)
- Shengshui (升水镇)
- Daping (大坪镇)
- Shenba (神坝镇)
- Ba'erhu (八尔湖镇)
- Shilong (石龙镇)
- Xishui (西水镇)
- Tongping (桐坪镇)

Townships

- Wuling (五灵乡)
- Xiaoyuan (小元乡)
- Hongguan (宏观乡)
- Shuangfeng (双峰乡)
- Taixia (太霞乡)

== Climate ==
Climate data for Nanbu, elevation 406 m (1,332 ft), (1991–2020 normals, extremes 1981–present)
| Month | Jan | Feb | Mar | Apr | May | Jun | Jul | Aug | Sep | Oct | Nov | Dec | Year |
|---|---|---|---|---|---|---|---|---|---|---|---|---|---|
| Record high °C (°F) | 19.6 (67.3) | 23.6 (74.5) | 31.2 (88.2) | 34.1 (93.4) | 36.4 (97.5) | 37.4 (99.3) | 40.0 (104.0) | 42.4 (108.3) | 38.8 (101.8) | 33.1 (91.6) | 25.4 (77.7) | 18.1 (64.6) | 42.4 (108.3) |
| Mean daily maximum °C (°F) | 9.5 (49.1) | 12.6 (54.7) | 17.6 (63.7) | 23.4 (74.1) | 27.1 (80.8) | 29.4 (84.9) | 32.0 (89.6) | 32.3 (90.1) | 26.7 (80.1) | 21.3 (70.3) | 16.2 (61.2) | 10.4 (50.7) | 21.5 (70.8) |
| Daily mean °C (°F) | 6.1 (43.0) | 8.7 (47.7) | 12.9 (55.2) | 18.0 (64.4) | 21.8 (71.2) | 24.7 (76.5) | 27.3 (81.1) | 27.1 (80.8) | 22.5 (72.5) | 17.5 (63.5) | 12.6 (54.7) | 7.5 (45.5) | 17.2 (63.0) |
| Mean daily minimum °C (°F) | 3.8 (38.8) | 5.9 (42.6) | 9.5 (49.1) | 14.0 (57.2) | 17.9 (64.2) | 21.2 (70.2) | 23.7 (74.7) | 23.4 (74.1) | 19.6 (67.3) | 15.1 (59.2) | 10.3 (50.5) | 5.4 (41.7) | 14.2 (57.5) |
| Record low °C (°F) | −3.3 (26.1) | −1.6 (29.1) | −2.2 (28.0) | 4.6 (40.3) | 9.1 (48.4) | 14.2 (57.6) | 17.0 (62.6) | 16.7 (62.1) | 13.2 (55.8) | 1.7 (35.1) | 0.6 (33.1) | −4.3 (24.3) | −4.3 (24.3) |
| Average precipitation mm (inches) | 14.1 (0.56) | 16.2 (0.64) | 32.0 (1.26) | 66.0 (2.60) | 102.1 (4.02) | 148.1 (5.83) | 167.7 (6.60) | 141.5 (5.57) | 140.3 (5.52) | 71.3 (2.81) | 33.0 (1.30) | 14.0 (0.55) | 946.3 (37.26) |
| Average precipitation days (≥ 0.1 mm) | 7.7 | 7.4 | 9.7 | 10.8 | 12.4 | 13.4 | 13.1 | 10.5 | 13.3 | 13.9 | 8.4 | 7.1 | 127.7 |
| Average snowy days | 0.9 | 0.4 | 0 | 0 | 0 | 0 | 0 | 0 | 0 | 0 | 0 | 0.4 | 1.7 |
| Average relative humidity (%) | 82 | 78 | 74 | 73 | 73 | 79 | 79 | 76 | 82 | 84 | 83 | 83 | 79 |
| Mean monthly sunshine hours | 48.6 | 58.7 | 98.5 | 134.9 | 138.2 | 129.5 | 169.9 | 179.8 | 99.1 | 73.6 | 58.7 | 41.6 | 1,231.1 |
| Percentage possible sunshine | 15 | 19 | 26 | 35 | 32 | 31 | 40 | 44 | 27 | 21 | 19 | 13 | 27 |
Source: China Meteorological Administrationall-time July High
