= Weishi County =

Weishi County 尉氏县
- County
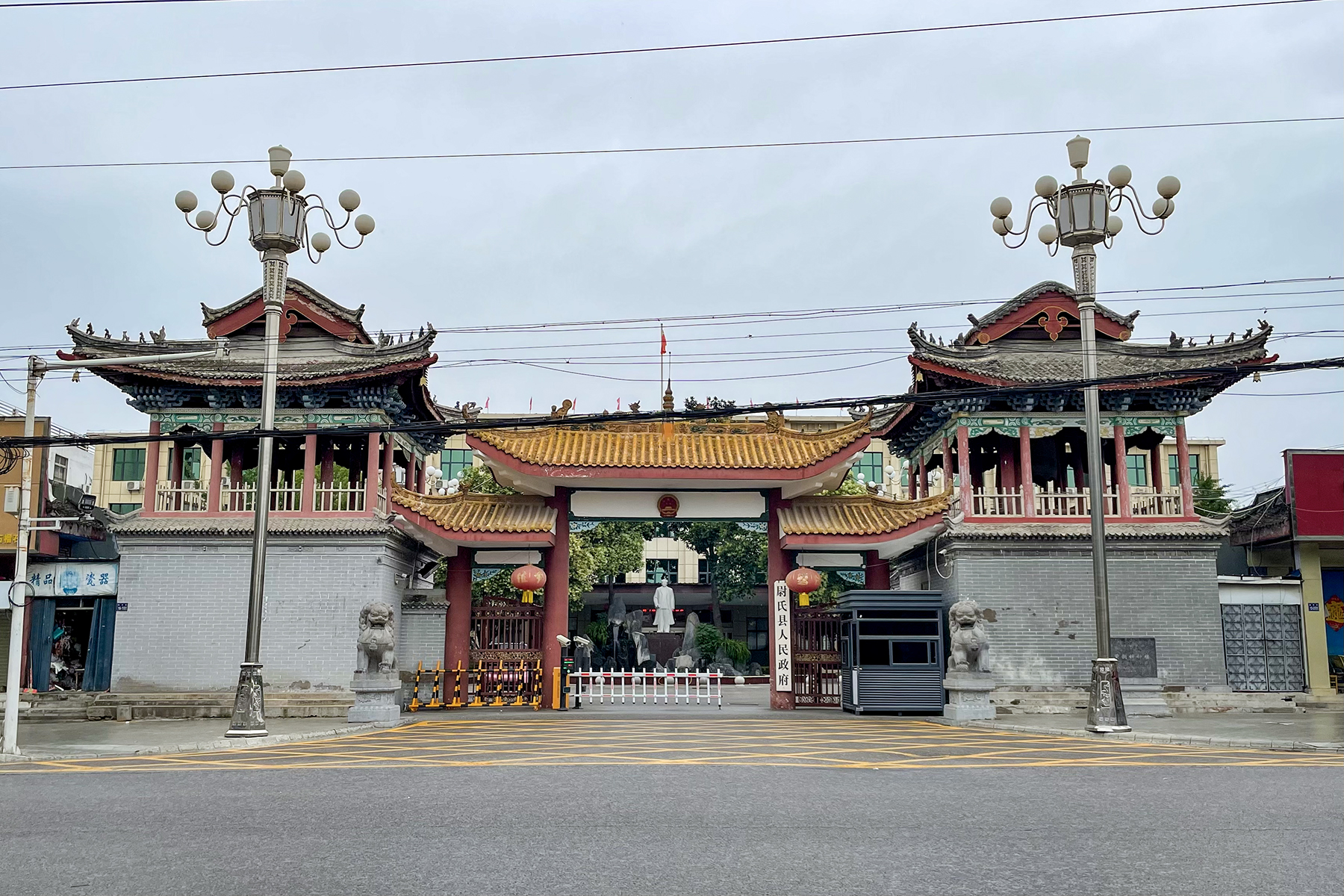
- Main gate of Weishi County People's Government

- Location of the seat in Henan
- Coordinates: 34°24′40″N 114°11′35″E
- Country: People's Republic of China
- Province: Henan
- Prefecture-level city: Kaifeng

Area
  - Total: 1,257 km^{2} (485 sq mi)

Population (2019)
  - Total: 851,000
  - Density: 677/km^{2} (1,750/sq mi)
- Time zone: UTC+8 (China Standard)
- Postal code: 475000

Weishi County (Chinese: 尉氏县; pinyin: Wèishì Xiàn) is a county in the central part of Henan province, China. It is under the administration of Kaifeng City.

== Administrative divisions ==
As of 2012, this county is divided to 9 towns and 8 townships.

Towns

- Chengguan (城关镇)
- Caizhuang (蔡庄镇)
- Shibali (十八里镇)
- Shuipo (水坡镇)
- Weichuan (洧川镇)
- Yongxing (永兴镇)
- Zhangshi (张市镇)
- Zhuqu (朱曲镇)
- Daying (大营镇)

Townships

- Dama Township (大马乡)
- Daqiao Township (大桥乡)
- Gangli Township (岗李乡)
- Menlouren Township (门楼任乡)
- Nancao Township (南曹乡)
- Xiaochen Township (小陈乡)
- Xingzhuang Township (邢庄乡)
- Zhuangtou Township (庄头乡)

== Climate ==
Climate data for Weishi, elevation 67 m (220 ft), (1991–2020 normals, extremes 1981–present)
Month	Jan	Feb	Mar	Apr	May	Jun	Jul	Aug	Sep	Oct	Nov	Dec	Year
Record high °C (°F)	21.2 (70.2)	22.7 (72.9)	30.5 (86.9)	33.4 (92.1)	38.9 (102.0)	39.8 (103.6)	39.4 (102.9)	38.3 (100.9)	36.3 (97.3)	34.9 (94.8)	27.9 (82.2)	21.2 (70.2)	39.8 (103.6)
Mean daily maximum °C (°F)	5.7 (42.3)	9.6 (49.3)	15.3 (59.5)	21.5 (70.7)	27.0 (80.6)	31.8 (89.2)	31.9 (89.4)	30.6 (87.1)	26.9 (80.4)	22.0 (71.6)	14.3 (57.7)	7.7 (45.9)	20.4 (68.6)
Daily mean °C (°F)	0.4 (32.7)	3.8 (38.8)	9.3 (48.7)	15.3 (59.5)	20.8 (69.4)	25.6 (78.1)	27.1 (80.8)	25.7 (78.3)	21.0 (69.8)	15.4 (59.7)	8.3 (46.9)	2.3 (36.1)	14.6 (58.2)
Mean daily minimum °C (°F)	−3.6 (25.5)	−0.7 (30.7)	4.2 (39.6)	9.8 (49.6)	15.2 (59.4)	20.2 (68.4)	23.2 (73.8)	22.0 (71.6)	16.5 (61.7)	10.4 (50.7)	3.8 (38.8)	−1.7 (28.9)	9.9 (49.9)
Record low °C (°F)	−16.6 (2.1)	−16.7 (1.9)	−12.5 (9.5)	−2.9 (26.8)	2.4 (36.3)	10.5 (50.9)	16.4 (61.5)	11.7 (53.1)	3.9 (39.0)	−2.0 (28.4)	−15.5 (4.1)	−15.1 (4.8)	−16.7 (1.9)
Average precipitation mm (inches)	10.9 (0.43)	14.2 (0.56)	23.4 (0.92)	38.7 (1.52)	57.7 (2.27)	76.7 (3.02)	155.4 (6.12)	130.1 (5.12)	70.2 (2.76)	41.7 (1.64)	30.8 (1.21)	10.6 (0.42)	660.4 (25.99)
Average precipitation days (≥ 0.1 mm)	3.7	4.0	5.0	5.7	7.5	7.8	10.6	9.7	8.5	6.2	5.4	3.6	77.7
Average snowy days	4.0	3.1	1.2	0.2	0	0	0	0	0	0	1.1	2.6	12.2
Average relative humidity (%)	66	65	64	69	71	70	83	85	81	74	71	67	72
Mean monthly sunshine hours	107.0	119.8	158.4	188.0	206.6	190.2	174.5	165.0	148.3	143.5	127.0	116.7	1,845
Percentage possible sunshine	34	38	43	48	48	44	40	40	40	41	41	38	41
Source: China Meteorological Administration all-time January high
