= Daqiao, Hejiang County =

Daqiao 大桥镇
- Town
- Location in Sichuan
- Coordinates: 28°51′18″N 105°40′53″E
- Country: People's Republic of China
- Province: Sichuan
- Prefecture-level city: Luzhou
- County: Hejiang
- Elevation: 270 m (890 ft)
- Time zone: UTC+8 (China Standard)

Daqiao (simplified Chinese: 大桥; traditional Chinese: 大橋; pinyin: Dàqiáo; lit. 'great or large bridge') is a town of Hejiang County in southeastern Sichuan province, China, located in gently rolling hills about 1 kilometre (0.62 mi) south of the Yangtze River and 23 km (14 mi) east of downtown Luzhou. As of 2018, it has one residential community (社区) and 15 villages under its administration.
