= Daqiao Township, Weishi County =

Daqiao Township 大桥乡
- Township
- Location in Henan
- Coordinates: 34°23′58″N 114°08′44″E
- Country: People's Republic of China
- Province: Henan
- Prefecture-level city: Kaifeng
- County: Weishi
- Village-level divisions: 30 villages
- Elevation: 69 m (226 ft)
- Time zone: UTC+8 (China Standard)
- Area code: 0378

Daqiao Township (simplified Chinese: 大桥乡; traditional Chinese: 大橋鄉; pinyin: Dàqiáo Xiāng; lit. 'great or large bridge') is a township of Weishi County in north-central Henan province, China, located adjacent to and southwest of the county seat. As of 2018, it has 30 villages under its administration.

== See also ==
- List of township-level divisions of Henan
