= Daqiao Township, Xinjiang =

Daqiao Township 大桥乡
- Township
- Location in Xinjiang
- Coordinates: 41°39′29″N 81°32′58″E
- Country: People's Republic of China
- Region: Xinjiang
- Prefecture: Aksu
- County: Baicheng
- Village-level divisions: 9 villages and 1 residential zone
- Elevation: 1,331 m (4,367 ft)
- Time zone: UTC+8 (China Standard)

Daqiao Township (simplified Chinese: 大桥乡; traditional Chinese: 大橋鄉; pinyin: Dàqiáo Xiāng; lit. 'great or large bridge') is a township in an oasis in the north of the Tarim Basin, administratively part of Baicheng County, Aksu Prefecture, in west-central Xinjiang, China; it is situated, as the crow flies, about 30 kilometres (19 mi) southwest of the county seat and 120 kilometres (75 mi) northeast of Aksu City, the prefectural seat. As of 2018, it has nine villages and one residential zone under its administration.

== See also ==
- List of township-level divisions of Xinjiang
