= Daqiao, Dong'e County =

Daqiao 大桥镇
- Town
- Location in Shandong Daqiao (China)
- Coordinates: 36°18′44″N 116°21′50″E
- Country: People's Republic of China
- Province: Shandong
- Prefecture-level city: Liaocheng
- County: Dong'e
- Elevation: 37 m (121 ft)
- Time zone: UTC+8 (China Standard)
- Area code: 0635

Daqiao (simplified Chinese: 大桥; traditional Chinese: 大橋; pinyin: Dàqiáo; lit. 'great or large bridge') is a town in Dong'e County in western Shandong province, China, located on the northern (left) bank of the Yellow River about 11 kilometres (6.8 mi) east-southeast of the county seat and just across the river from Pingyin County. The town is served by China National Highway 105 . As of 2018, it has 31 villages under its administration.

== See also ==
- List of township-level divisions of Shandong
