= Daqiao, Yancheng =

Daqiao 大桥镇
- Town
- Location in Jiangsu
- Coordinates: 32°59′43″N 120°38′6″E
- Country: People's Republic of China
- Province: Jiangsu
- Prefecture-level city: Yancheng
- District: Dafeng District
- Time zone: UTC+8 (China Standard)

Daqiao (simplified Chinese: 大桥; traditional Chinese: 大橋; pinyin: Dàqiáo) is a town in Dafeng District, Yancheng, Jiangsu province, China. As of 2018, it has 13 villages under its administration.

== See also ==
- List of township-level divisions of Jiangsu
