= Daqiao Township, Huize County =

Daqiao Township 大桥乡
- Township
- Location in Yunnan
- Coordinates: 26°41′09″N 103°20′00″E
- Country: People's Republic of China
- Province: Yunnan
- Prefecture-level city: Qujing
- County: Huize County
- Village-level divisions: 14 villages
- Elevation: 2,533 m (8,310 ft)
- Time zone: UTC+8 (China Standard)
- Area code: 0874

Daqiao Township (simplified Chinese: 大桥乡; traditional Chinese: 大橋鄉; pinyin: Dàqiáo Xiāng; lit. 'great or large bridge') is a township of Huize County in northeastern Yunnan province, China; it is situated about 30 kilometres (19 mi) north-northeast of the county seat, 81 km (50 mi) southwest of Zhaotong, and 140 km (87 mi) northwest of Qujing as the crow flies. As of 2018, it has 14 villages under its administration. The township is located on the northeastern shore of the Yuejin Reservoir (跃进水库).
