= Daqiao, Gansu =

Daqiao 大桥镇
- Town
- Location in Gansu
- Coordinates: 33°44′42″N 105°16′51″E
- Country: People's Republic of China
- Province: Gansu
- Prefecture-level city: Longnan
- County: Xihe
- Village-level divisions: 14 villages
- Elevation: 1,080 m (3,540 ft)
- Time zone: UTC+8 (China Standard)
- Area code: 0939

Daqiao (simplified Chinese: 大桥; traditional Chinese: 大橋; pinyin: Dàqiáo; lit. 'great or large bridge') is a town of Xihe County in southeastern Gansu province, China, located about 29 kilometres (18 mi) due south of the county seat and 51 km (32 mi) northeast of Longnan. As of 2018, it has 14 villages under its administration.

== See also ==
- List of township-level divisions of Gansu
