= Dawen River =

River in Shandong, China

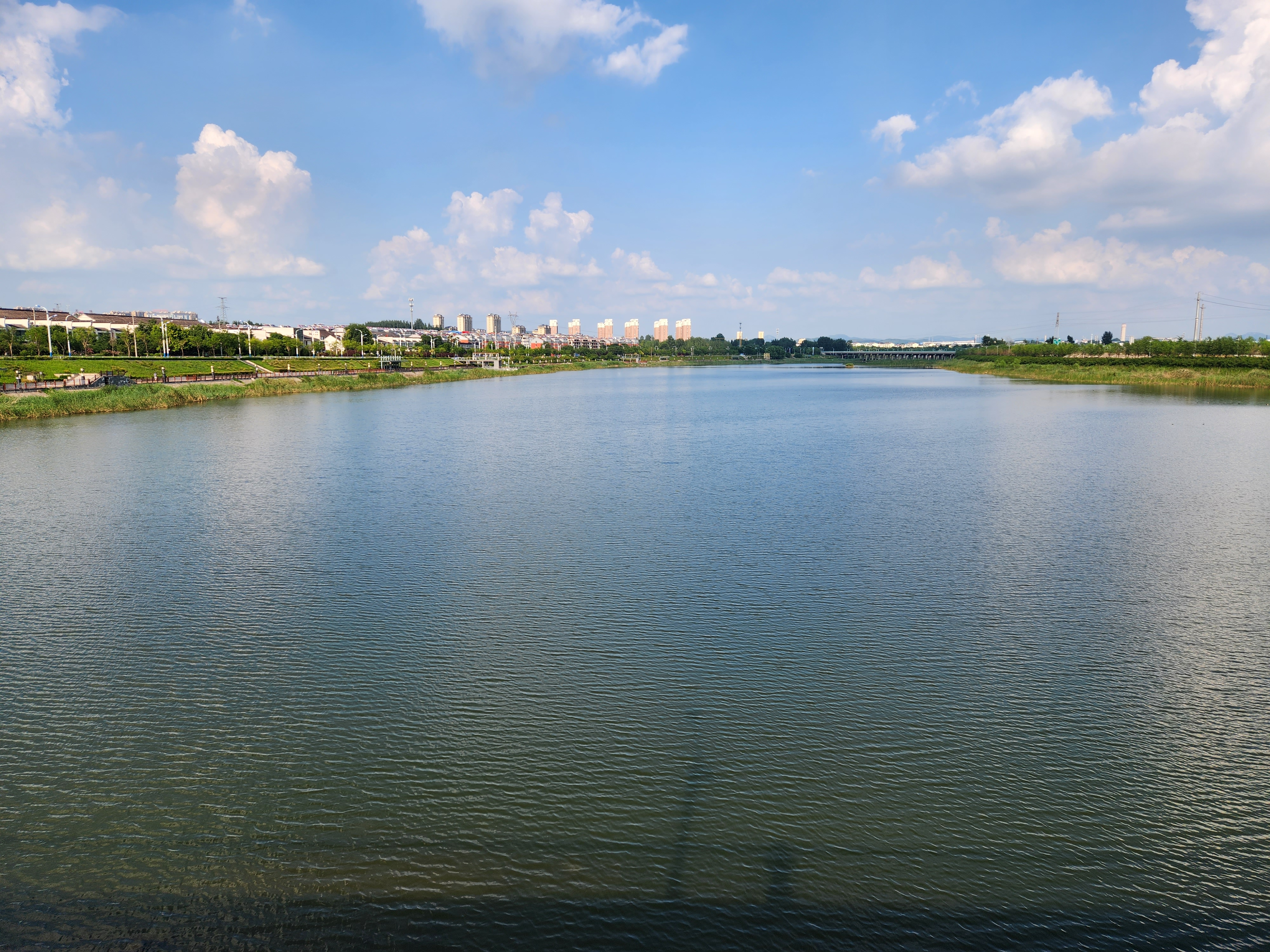
- Taken at the south of Guan Chang village, 2023 summer

- Estuary in Shandong Province

Physical characteristics
- Source: source of Mou Wen River
  - location: Sha Yai Zi Village, Da Zhang Zhuang Town, Yiyuan County
  - coordinates: 35.991°N 117.963°E
- 2nd source: source of Chai Wen River
  - location: Niu Lan Yu Village, Da Zhang Zhuang Town, Yiyuan County
  - coordinates: 35.969°N 117.949°E
- Mouth: estuary of Daqing River
  - location: Ma Kou Village, Zhou Cheng Town, Dongping County
  - coordinates: 35.929°N 116.265°E
  - elevation: 41 metres (135 ft)
- Length: 208 kilometres (129 mi)
- Basin size: 9,069 square kilometres (3,502 sq mi)
- Discharge
  - average: 0.006 cubic metres per second (0.21 cu ft/s)

Basin features
- Progression: west
- River system: Yellow River System
- Tributaries
  - left: Xin Fu River, Lotus River, Wen Nan River, Hui(惠) River, Tao River, Shi Liang River, Chai Wen River, Chao River, Miao Jia River and Hui(汇) River
  - right: Xin Zhuang River, Xiao Yi River, Si Ma River, Fang Xia River, Ying Wen River, Pang River and Zhu River

Dawen River (Chinese: 大汶河; pinyin: Dàwèn Hé) is a river in Shandong Province, China. The main branch, Mouwen River, of the river originates from Yiyuan County, flows through Xintai, Laiwu, and merges with Chaiwen River at Dawenkou. Then, it flows through Tai'an, Feicheng, empties into Dongping Lake which enters Yellow River. The section of the river from Dongping onwards is also known as Daqing River (Chinese: 大清河; pinyin: Dàqīng Hé).

In ancient times, this river was called the 'Wen', and it was the border between the State of Lu and the State of Qi.

== See also ==
- List of rivers in China
