= Dongping Lake =

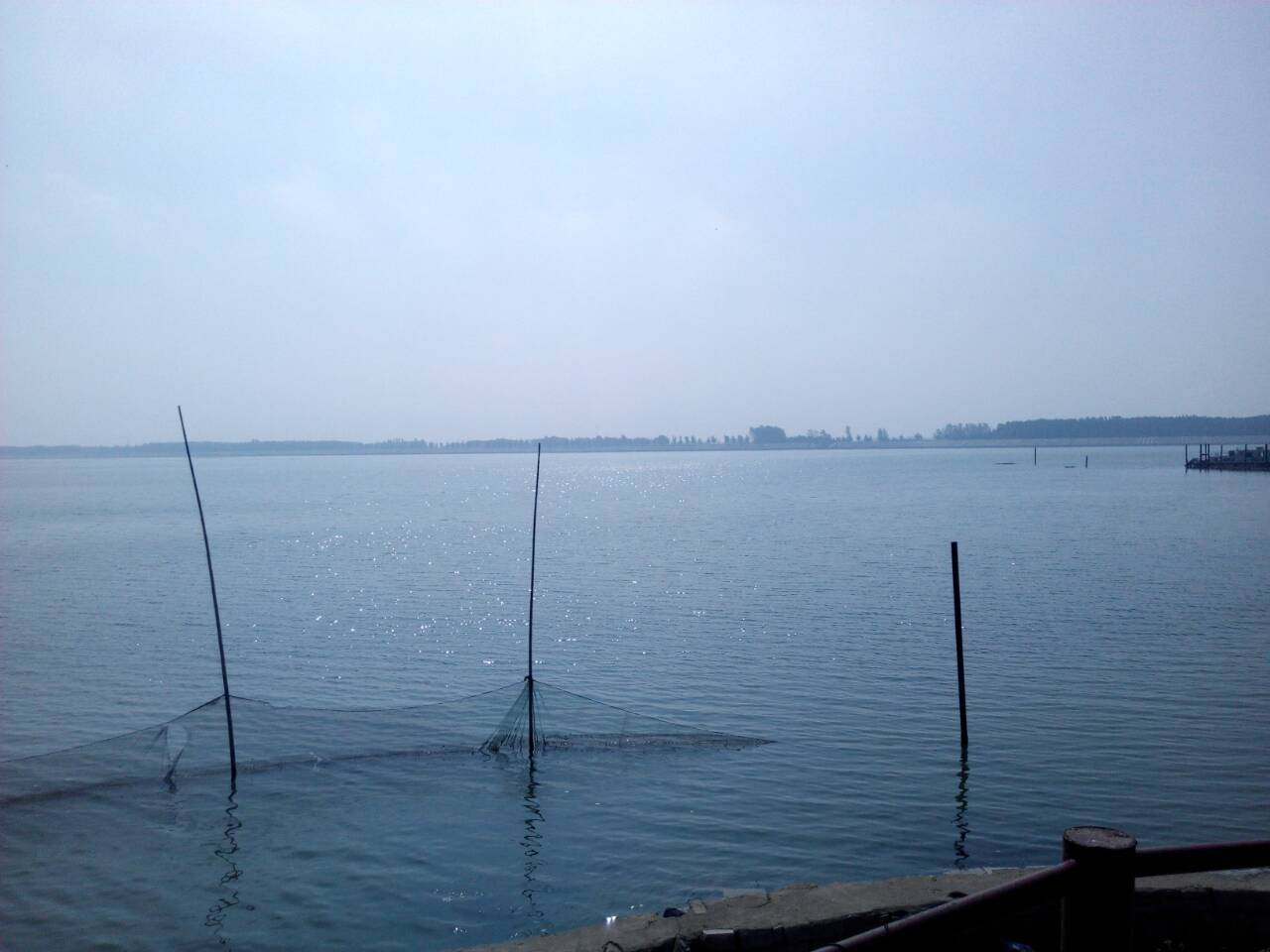
- Dongping Lake

- Location within Shandong
- Coordinates: 35°57′53″N 116°11′45″E
- Lake type: Fresh water lake
- Primary inflows: Dawen River
- Primary outflows: Yellow River
- Catchment area: 9,064 km^{2} (3,500 sq mi)
- Basin countries: China
- Max. length: 23.5 km (15 mi)
- Max. width: 9.7 km (6 mi)
- Surface area: 148 km^{2} (100 sq mi)
- Average depth: 1.59 m (5 ft)
- Max. depth: 2.4 m (8 ft)
- Water volume: 235×10^{6} m^{3} (8.3×10^{9} cu ft)
- Surface elevation: 41 m (135 ft)

The Dongping Lake (Chinese: 东平湖; pinyin: Dōngpíng Hú) is a freshwater lake in Shandong Province of China. It is situated in Dongping County in the west of Shandong Province, south of the lower reaches of Yellow River. The lake has a total area of about 148 square kilometers. The average depth is 1.59 m, the water storage capacity is about 2.35×10^{8}m^{3}.

The Dongping Lake is the second largest fresh-water lake in Shandong Province; it is the only extant water area of the Eight Hundred Li Liangshan Lake (Chinese: 八百里梁山水泊) described in the famous medieval novel, Water Margin, one of the Four Great Classical Novels of Chinese literature.

The Dongping Lake will be used as a reservoir on the Eastern Route of China's South–North Water Transfer Project. (The Yangtze River to Yellow River route, mostly piggybacking on, or paralleling, the Grand Canal of China.) As the water transfer system entered its testing stage in the summer of 2013, the area's fish farmers started complaining that the polluted Yangtze River water entering the Dongping Lake is killing their fish.

== See also ==
- Zhoucheng Subdistrict
- Chinese replenishment ship Dongpinghu
