= Dong'e County =

Dong'e 东阿县 Tunga
- County
- Location in Shandong
- Coordinates: 36°20′0″N 116°15′0″E
- Country: People's Republic of China
- Province: Shandong
- Prefecture-level city: Liaocheng

Area
  - Total: 729 km^{2} (281 sq mi)

Population (2019)
  - Total: 386,200
  - Density: 530/km^{2} (1,370/sq mi)
- Time zone: UTC+8 (China Standard)
- Postal code: 252200
- Area code: 0635

Dong'e County (simplified Chinese: 东阿县; traditional Chinese: 東阿縣; pinyin: Dōng'ē Xiàn) is a county under the jurisdiction of the prefecture-level city of Liaocheng, in Shandong province of China. It is located on the left (northern) bank of the Yellow River, some 100 km (62 mi) upstream from the provincial capital Jinan.

The county is regionally and nationally renowned for the production of Ejiao, a donkey-hide gelatine used in traditional Chinese medicine. According to a ca. 1723 account by the French Jesuits Dominique Parrenin, there was a well in this county which was normally kept closed and sealed, and which was only opened when water was taken to be used in preparation of Ejiao for the emperor's court.

== Administrative divisions ==
As of 2012, this county is divided to 2 subdistricts, 7 towns and 2 townships.

Subdistricts

- Tongcheng Subdistrict (铜城街道)
- Xincheng Subdistrict (新城街道)

Towns

- Liuji (刘集镇)
- Niujiaodian (牛角店镇)
- Daqiao (大桥镇)
- Gaoji (高集镇)
- Jianglou (姜楼镇)
- Guguantun (顾官屯镇)
- Yaozhai (姚寨镇)

Townships

- Yushan Township (鱼山乡)
- Chenji Township (陈集乡)

== Climate ==
Climate data for Dong'e, elevation 31 m (102 ft), (1991–2020 normals, extremes 1981–2010)
Month	Jan	Feb	Mar	Apr	May	Jun	Jul	Aug	Sep	Oct	Nov	Dec	Year
Record high °C (°F)	17.3 (63.1)	21.9 (71.4)	28.0 (82.4)	32.9 (91.2)	36.7 (98.1)	41.2 (106.2)	40.7 (105.3)	36.3 (97.3)	36.1 (97.0)	34.9 (94.8)	25.7 (78.3)	18.4 (65.1)	41.2 (106.2)
Mean daily maximum °C (°F)	4.2 (39.6)	8.2 (46.8)	14.5 (58.1)	21.0 (69.8)	26.6 (79.9)	31.8 (89.2)	32.1 (89.8)	30.6 (87.1)	27.2 (81.0)	21.3 (70.3)	12.8 (55.0)	5.9 (42.6)	19.7 (67.4)
Daily mean °C (°F)	−1.0 (30.2)	2.6 (36.7)	8.7 (47.7)	15.2 (59.4)	20.9 (69.6)	26.0 (78.8)	27.4 (81.3)	25.8 (78.4)	21.4 (70.5)	15.3 (59.5)	7.4 (45.3)	0.8 (33.4)	14.2 (57.6)
Mean daily minimum °C (°F)	−5.2 (22.6)	−1.9 (28.6)	3.7 (38.7)	10.0 (50.0)	15.5 (59.9)	20.7 (69.3)	23.5 (74.3)	22.1 (71.8)	16.8 (62.2)	10.4 (50.7)	3.0 (37.4)	−3.2 (26.2)	9.6 (49.3)
Record low °C (°F)	−19.2 (−2.6)	−14.8 (5.4)	−7.9 (17.8)	−1.9 (28.6)	4.8 (40.6)	9.9 (49.8)	17.2 (63.0)	11.5 (52.7)	6.5 (43.7)	−1.3 (29.7)	−13.3 (8.1)	−16.2 (2.8)	−19.2 (−2.6)
Average precipitation mm (inches)	4.2 (0.17)	9.0 (0.35)	12.1 (0.48)	33.0 (1.30)	55.1 (2.17)	66.4 (2.61)	158.4 (6.24)	141.6 (5.57)	52.4 (2.06)	30.6 (1.20)	21.1 (0.83)	6.2 (0.24)	590.1 (23.22)
Average precipitation days (≥ 0.1 mm)	2.0	3.2	3.2	5.0	6.3	7.8	10.9	10.2	6.7	5.3	4.4	2.7	67.7
Average snowy days	2.6	2.8	0.8	0.2	0	0	0	0	0	0	1.0	2.1	9.5
Average relative humidity (%)	61	57	54	59	63	60	76	81	74	66	66	65	65
Mean monthly sunshine hours	141.8	152.8	206.0	231.4	256.5	227.4	194.4	193.7	187.9	182.2	153.8	146.4	2,274.3
Percentage possible sunshine	46	49	55	59	59	52	44	47	51	53	51	49	51
Source: China Meteorological Administration

== Sister cities ==
- Izumisano, Osaka, Japan

== See also ==
- Cheng Yu
- Ejiao

== Famous people ==
- Su Shulin, Governor of Fujian
