= Liangshan County =

Liangshan County 梁山县
- County
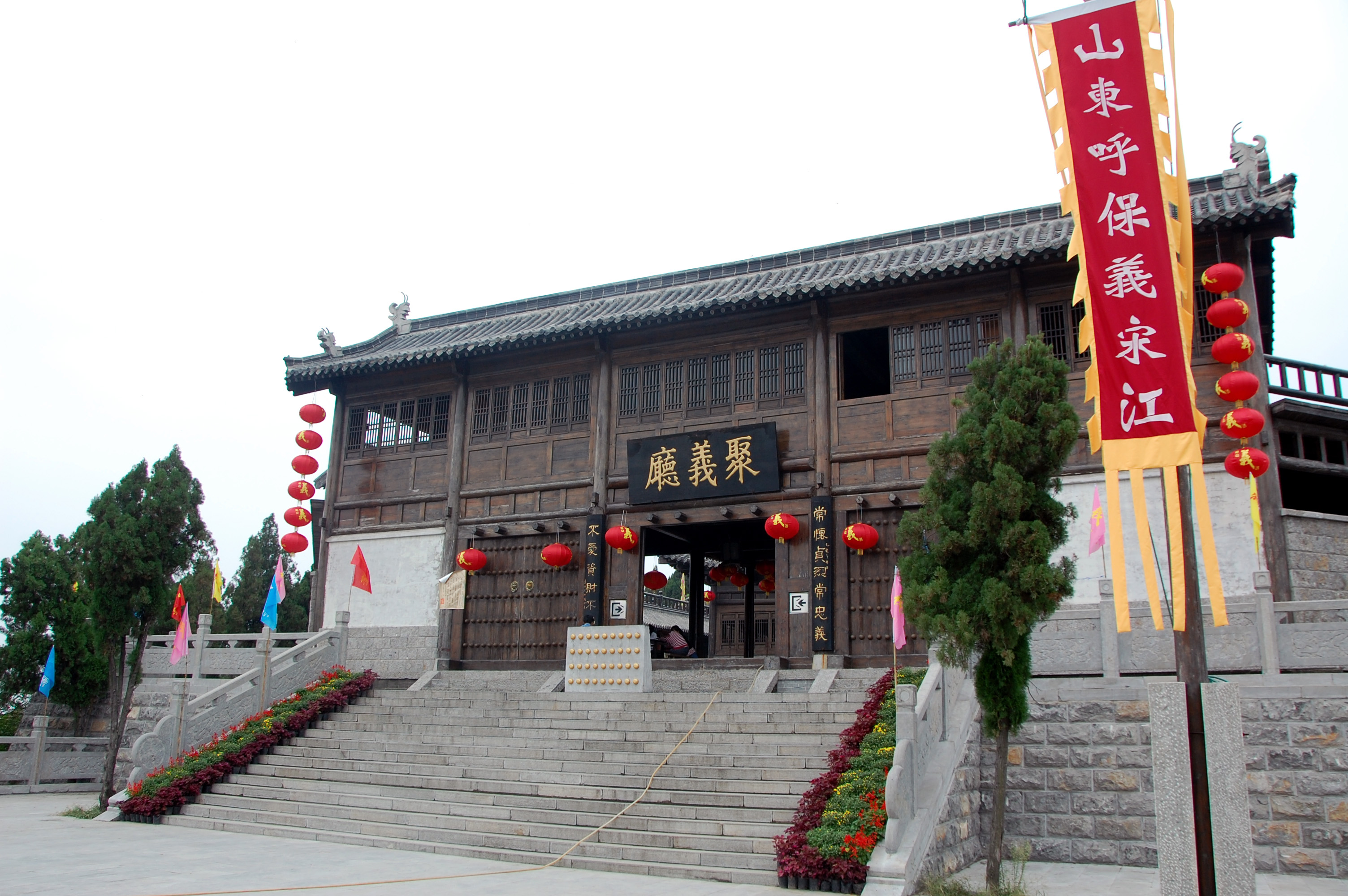
- Shuipo Liangshan

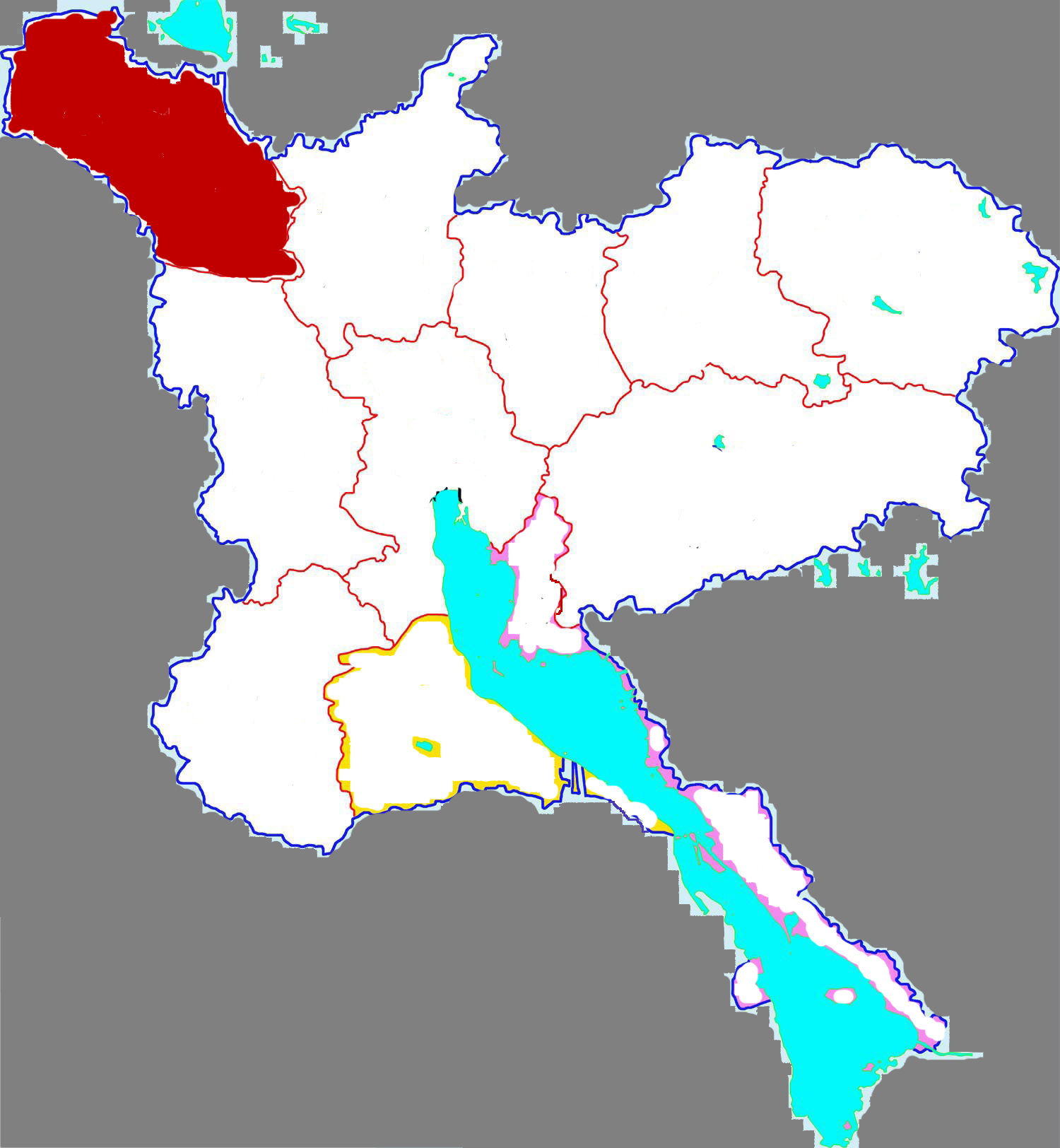
- Location in Jining

- Location of the seat in Shandong
- Coordinates: 35°48′45″N 116°06′10″E
- Country: People's Republic of China
- Province: Shandong
- Prefecture-level city: Jining

Area
  - Total: 961 km^{2} (371 sq mi)

Population (2019)
  - Total: 847,894
  - Density: 882/km^{2} (2,290/sq mi)
- Time zone: UTC+8 (China Standard)
- Postal code: 272600
- Website: www.liangshan.gov.cn

Liangshan County (Chinese: 梁山县; pinyin: Liángshān Xiàn) is a county situated in the southwest of Shandong province, China. It is administered by the prefecture-level city of Jining.

== Geography ==
Liangshan County is situated north west of Jining in the south west of Shandong province. To the east it borders the prefecture-level cities of Tai'an, Heze to the west. To the north, the Yellow River separates Liangshan from Puyang, in Henan province.

== Climate ==
Climate data for Liangshan, elevation 41 m (135 ft), (1991–2020 normals, extremes 1981–2010)
Month	Jan	Feb	Mar	Apr	May	Jun	Jul	Aug	Sep	Oct	Nov	Dec	Year
Record high °C (°F)	16.5 (61.7)	23.9 (75.0)	28.3 (82.9)	33.5 (92.3)	37.0 (98.6)	41.7 (107.1)	40.7 (105.3)	36.1 (97.0)	35.4 (95.7)	35.1 (95.2)	26.5 (79.7)	20.5 (68.9)	41.7 (107.1)
Mean daily maximum °C (°F)	4.4 (39.9)	8.5 (47.3)	14.6 (58.3)	20.9 (69.6)	26.4 (79.5)	31.6 (88.9)	31.9 (89.4)	30.4 (86.7)	27.0 (80.6)	21.4 (70.5)	13.0 (55.4)	6.1 (43.0)	19.7 (67.4)
Daily mean °C (°F)	−1.0 (30.2)	2.6 (36.7)	8.4 (47.1)	14.7 (58.5)	20.4 (68.7)	25.6 (78.1)	27.2 (81.0)	25.7 (78.3)	21.1 (70.0)	15.1 (59.2)	7.3 (45.1)	0.9 (33.6)	14.0 (57.2)
Mean daily minimum °C (°F)	−5.2 (22.6)	−2.0 (28.4)	3.1 (37.6)	9.2 (48.6)	14.8 (58.6)	20.2 (68.4)	23.3 (73.9)	22.0 (71.6)	16.5 (61.7)	10.0 (50.0)	2.8 (37.0)	−3.2 (26.2)	9.3 (48.7)
Record low °C (°F)	−20.5 (−4.9)	−16.6 (2.1)	−11.1 (12.0)	−4.4 (24.1)	3.0 (37.4)	9.9 (49.8)	16.3 (61.3)	11.4 (52.5)	4.3 (39.7)	−3.2 (26.2)	−13.3 (8.1)	−16.5 (2.3)	−20.5 (−4.9)
Average precipitation mm (inches)	5.6 (0.22)	10.5 (0.41)	13.7 (0.54)	31.7 (1.25)	49.5 (1.95)	66.9 (2.63)	152.3 (6.00)	133.3 (5.25)	56.1 (2.21)	30.0 (1.18)	26.3 (1.04)	7.8 (0.31)	583.7 (22.99)
Average precipitation days (≥ 0.1 mm)	2.8	3.7	3.7	5.2	6.4	7.4	10.6	10.1	7.1	5.4	4.7	2.9	70
Average snowy days	2.8	2.5	0.6	0.2	0	0	0	0	0	0	0.8	1.9	8.8
Average relative humidity (%)	64	61	58	65	68	64	79	84	78	71	70	68	69
Mean monthly sunshine hours	140.9	147.5	198.0	224.2	246.3	219.9	196.2	190.0	185.0	185.0	152.8	141.6	2,227.4
Percentage possible sunshine	45	48	53	57	57	51	45	46	50	54	50	47	50
Source: China Meteorological Administration

== History ==
The area was from prehistoric times surrounded by the largest marshland in north China, called the Daye Marsh and later the Liangshan Marsh. Because the area was largely a wasteland on the frontiers of several administrative units, government control was minimal, and bandit chiefs were active in the area. During the Song dynasty Liang Shan (Mount Liang) became known as the "eight hundred li moorage of Mount Liang" and located at the extreme north of the Yellow River which passed through the area. When the Yellow River shifted its course in 1289, the marshes of Liangshan shrunk considerably. During the Ming dynasty it had been reduced to five smaller marshlands. Banditry continued on Mount Liang until the mid-seventeenth century, when the Qing dynasty government established a military garrison. The city of Liangshan evolved from the garrison. After the Yellow River shifted back to its northern course in 1853, the marshes were gradually filled in by sediments carried downstream by the river and human land reclamation. Today the relatively small Dongping Lake (Chinese: 东平湖; pinyin: Dōngpíng Hú) is what remains of the great marshes.

== Administrative divisions ==
As of 2012, this county is divided to 9 towns and 4 townships.

Towns

- Liangshan (梁山镇)
- Xiaolukou (小路口镇)
- Hangang (韩岗镇)
- Quanpu (拳铺镇)
- Yangying (杨营镇)
- Hangai (韩垓镇)
- Guanyi (馆驿镇)
- Xiao'anshan (小安山镇)
- Maying (马营镇)

Townships

- Shouzhangji Township (寿张集乡)
- Heihumiao Township (黑虎庙乡)
- Zhaogudui Township (赵堌堆乡)
- Dalukou Township (大路口乡)

== Tourism ==
The famous mountain Mount Liang (Liáng Shān) rises to 197.9 m above sea level is located within Liangshan County administrative territory. It is well known as the stronghold of the 108 legendary Song dynasty heroes of the classic Chinese novel the Water Margin.

== Transportation ==
- China National Highway 220
