= Weifang–Yantai high-speed railway =

High-speed rail line in China

Weifang–Yantai high-speed railway 潍烟高速铁路

Overview
- Status: Operational
- Termini: Weifang North; Yantai South
- Stations: 11

Service
- Operator: CR Jinan Group

History
- Opened: 21 October 2024

Technical
- Line length: 236.4 km (146.9 mi)
- Number of tracks: 2
- Track gauge: 1,435 mm (4 ft 8 1/2 in)
- Minimum radius: 7,000 metres (23,000 ft); 5,500 metres (18,000 ft) in difficult sections
- Electrification: 25 kV AC overhead
- Operating speed: 350 km/h (217 mph)
- Maximum incline: generally 2.0%

Weifang–Yantai high-speed railway is a high-speed railway in the northeast of Shandong province, China, connecting Weifang, Qingdao and Yantai, linking various county-level cities along the Bohai Sea coast between Yantai and Qingdao. The line is 236 km (147 mi)-long (of which 19.17 km (11.91 mi) are within Weifang City, 13.95 km (8.67 mi) are within Qingdao City, and 13.95 km (8.67 mi) are within Yantai City), with 9 stations and a design speed of 350 km/h (220 mph). It was opened on 21 October 2024.

== History ==
On 29 June 2020, the feasibility study for the section from Weifang to Yantai was approved. On 31 October 2020, the Weifang-Yantai high-speed railway commencement mobilisation meeting was held in Jinan, marking the official commencement of construction of the Weifang-Yantai high-speed railway. The Weifang–Yantai section of the railway opened on 21 October 2024.

== Route ==
Between Weifang North and Changyi, the route shares tracks with the Weifang–Laixi high-speed railway.

== Stations ==
Station Name	Chinese	China Railway transfers/connections
Weifang North	潍坊北	Jinan–Qingdao high-speed railway Weifang–Laixi high-speed railway
Changyi	昌邑	Weifang–Laixi high-speed railway
Huibu	灰埠	
Laizhou	莱州	
Zhaoyuan	招远	
Longkoushi	龙口市	
Yantai West	烟台西	
Fushan	福山	
Zhifu	芝罘	Qingdao–Rongcheng intercity railway
Yantai South	烟台南	Qingdao–Rongcheng intercity railway
