= Beijing−Shanghai high-speed railway Second Channel =

Railway line in China

Beijing-Shanghai High-Speed Railway Second Corridor

Overview
- Status: Under construction
- Termini: Beijing South; Shanghai East

Service
- Type: High-speed rail
- System: China Railway

Technical
- Line length: about 1,500 km (930 mi)
- Track gauge: 1,435 mm (4 ft 8 1/2 in) standard gauge
- Electrification: 25 kV 50 Hz AC (overhead line)
- Operating speed: 350 kilometres per hour (220 mph)

The Beijing-Shanghai High-Speed Railway Second Corridor (Chinese: 京沪高铁第二通道; pinyin: Jīnghù Gāotiě Dì'èr Tōngdào) is a new high-speed railway connecting Beijing and Shanghai in addition to the Beijing–Shanghai high-speed railway. The line runs from Beijing South to Anting and Situan in Shanghai, and the route is Beijing–Tianjin–Weifang–Linyi–Xinyi–Huai'an–Yancheng–Nantong–Shanghai. It consists of the Beijing–Tianjin ICR, the Tianjin–Weifang HSR, the Weifang–Suqian HSR, part of the Xuzhou–Yancheng HSR, part of the Lianyungang–Zhenjiang HSR and part of the Shanghai–Nanjing–Hefei HSR, with a total length of 1,424 km (885 mi).

== Route ==
=== Beijing South to Binhai Section ===
It is planned to use the existing Beijing–Tianjin intercity railway or the Beijing–Binhai intercity railway, under construction, incorporating eight stations: Beijing South, Yizhuang, Yongle, Wuqing, Tianjin, Junliangcheng North, Tanggu and Binhai.

=== Binhai to Weifang section ===
The Binhai to Weifang section runs from Binhai station, part of the Tianjin rail hub, and enters Hebei Province via Dagang, Nangang industrial zone, Dagang oilfield and Beidagang Wetland Nature Reserve, which are located in the Binhai New Area of Tianjin. It then crosses the Zhangwei New River through Huanghua City and Haixing County of Cangzhou City, and enters Shandong Province, and passes through Qingyun County of Dezhou City, Wudi County, Yangxin County and Bincheng District of Binzhou City, Lijin County, Dongying District and Guangrao County of Dongying City, Shouguang City and Hanting District of Weifang City, and runs to Weifang North station on the Jinan–Qingdao HSR. The total length is about 348.9 km (216.8 mi), with 10 stations, namely Binhai, Binhai East, Binhai South, Huanghua North, Haixing West, Wudi, Binzhou, Dongying South, Shouguang East and Weifang North. The railway standard is high-speed railway, double-track, with a design speed of 350 km/h (220 mph). To achieve railway interconnection, the project will also include the 150.7 km (93.6 mi)-long Jinan–Binzhou ICR, connecting with Jinan East, and a total of about 33 km (21 mi) of connecting lines to the Tianjin–Qinhuangdao HSR, the Beijing–Binhai ICR, and the Jinan–Qingdao HSR. It will also build a new Binhai West EMU depot and depots at Dongying South, Weifang North and elsewhere. The total cost of the project is estimated to be 114.54 billion yuan, and construction is estimated to take five years.

=== Weifang to Suqian section ===
The main line is 399.028 km (247.945 mi)-long, of which the Weifang to Xinyi section is 336.853 km (209.311 mi)-long (designed by China Railway Design Group Co., Ltd.) and the Xinyi to Suqian section is 62.175 km (38.634 mi)-long (designed by China Railway Fourth Survey and Design Institute Group Co., Ltd.). Other related projects include the Qingdao connecting line. There are 12 stations along the line, namely Weifang North (existing), Anqiu, Zhucheng West, Wulian North, Juxian North, Yinan, Linyi North (existing), Lanling, Tancheng West, Xinyi East, Suqian East, and Yanghe North ("signal station" or overtaking loop).

After the feasibility study of the proposed Hefei–Xinyi high-speed railway was reviewed in September 2020, in order to better promote the construction of the Beijing–Shanghai Second Channel, the China Railway Corporation merged the original new Weifang–Xinyi railway, the new Hefei–Xinyi railway, and the Xinyi East to Sixian East section of the Xinyi East to Yanghe North section into the new Weifang–Suqian railway project as part of the main channel of the Beijing–Shanghai Second Channel. Subsequently, the Suqian to Sixian East section of the original Hefei–Xinyi railway was reassigned to the Weifang-Suqian high-speed railway.

On 10 August 2023, the second information announcement on the environmental impact assessment of the new Weifang–Suqian HSR was released on the official website of the Qingdao Municipal Transportation Bureau.

=== Suqian to Huai'an section ===
The Xuzhou–Yancheng HSR from Suqian to Huai'an East has been opened.

=== Huai'an to Yangzhou section ===
The Lianyungang–Zhenjiang HSR from Huai'an East to Yangzhou East has been opened.

=== Yangzhou to Shanghai Section ===
It shares the same line with the Shanghai–Nanjing–Hefei HSR, currently under construction, from Yangzhou East to Shanghai Baoshan.
