= Laixi railway station =

Railway station in Qingdao, Shandong

Laixi 莱西
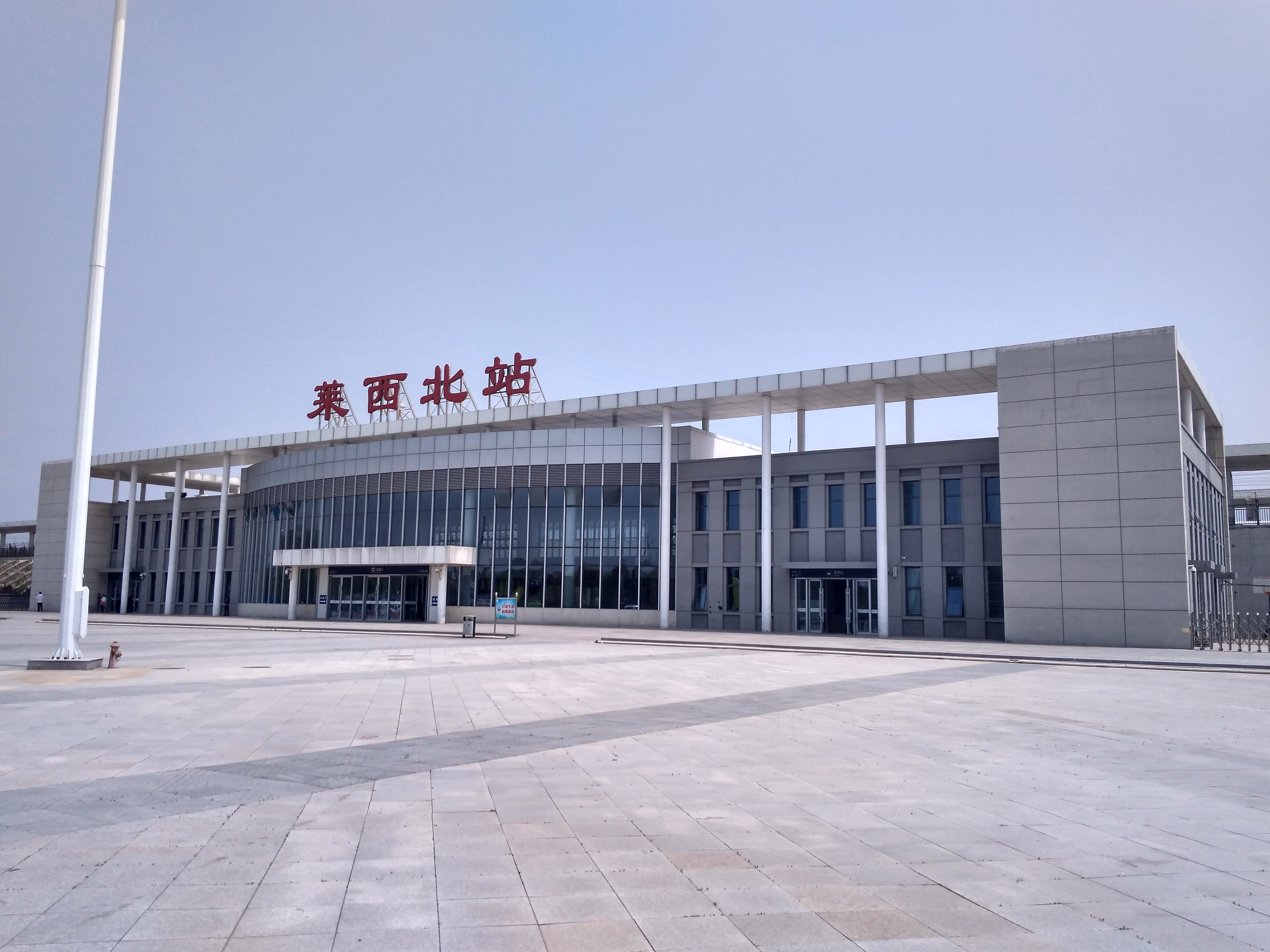
- Exterior of the station prior to reconstruction

General information
- Location: Laixi, Qingdao, Shandong; China
- Coordinates: 36.8232°N 120.5252°E
- Lines: Qingdao–Rongcheng intercity railway Weifang–Laixi high-speed railway Laixi–Rongcheng high-speed railway

History
- Opened: 28 December 2014
Location

Laixi railway station (Chinese: 莱西站; pinyin: Láixī zhàn) is a railway station in Laixi, Qingdao, Shandong, China. It is situated about 7 kilometres (4.3 mi) south of the centre of Laixi.

== History ==
The station was opened on 28 December 2014 along with the Qingdao–Rongcheng intercity railway. The station was closed from 10 July 2019 for reconstruction as part of the Weifang–Laixi high-speed railway. The station is the start of the Laixi–Rongcheng high-speed railway, which provides a faster journey to Rongcheng.

== Name ==
The station opened as Laixi North, despite being situated to the south of Laixi. However, it is about 2 kilometres (1.2 mi) north of Laixi railway station on the Lancun–Yantai railway, which opened in 1955. In 2020, in preparation for reopening, the name was changed to Laixi railway station. The original Laixi railway station was renamed Laixi South.

| Preceding station | China Railway High-speed | Following station |
|---|---|---|
| Xiagezhuang towards Qingdao North | Qingdao–Rongcheng intercity railway | Laiyang towards Rongcheng |
| Pingdu towards Weifang North | Weifang–Laixi high-speed railway | Terminus |
