= Taocun–Weihai railway =

Railway line in Shandong, China

Taocun–Weihai railway 桃威铁路
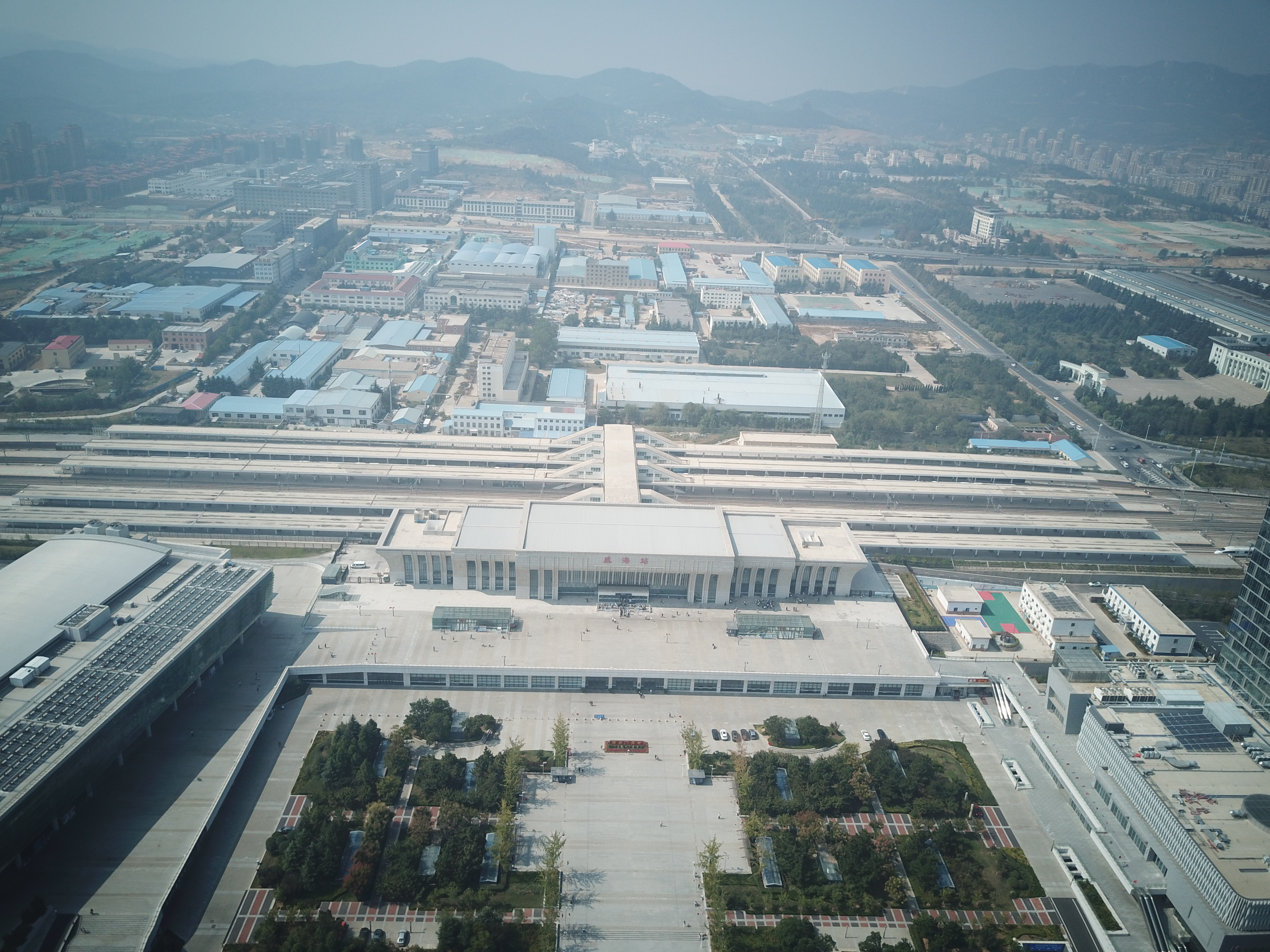
- Weihai Railway Station

Overview
- Status: Operating
- Locale: Yantai; Weihai
- Termini: Taocun; Weihai
- Stations: 4

Service
- Operator: China Railway

Technical
- Line length: 136 km (85 mi)
- Track gauge: 1,435 mm (4 ft 8 1/2 in)
- Operating speed: 80 km/h (50 mph)

The Taocun–Weihai railway is a passenger and freight railway line between Taocun and Weihai in China.

== History ==
The railway was approved on 1 June 1989 and construction began on 28 November 1990. Trial operation began on 26 March 1995 and the first passenger services were introduced in 1996.

In July 2020, work began on electrifying the line. The project will also see the maximum speed raised from 80 kilometres per hour (50 mph) to 120 kilometres per hour (75 mph). The branch to Weihai Port will also be upgraded, increasing the linespeed from 45 kilometres per hour (28 mph) to 75 kilometres per hour (47 mph).

== Route ==
The line has the following stations:

- Taocun (Lancun–Yantai railway)
- Rushan
- Wendeng
- Weihai (Qingdao–Rongcheng intercity railway)

Since its opening in 2014, it has been significantly quicker to use the Qingdao–Rongcheng intercity railway to reach Weihai. However, it does not serve Rushan and instead passes through Yantai. The currently under construction Laixi–Rongcheng high-speed railway will include a station, Rushan South, which will be closer to the city than the existing Rushan station.

== Incidents ==
On 25 July 2011, heavy rainfall led to landslides which damaged the line. While it was being repaired, trains terminated at Rushan and a rail replacement bus service took passengers to Wendeng and Weihai. The line was reopened on 31 July.
