= Yantai West railway station =

Railway station in Yantai, Shandong

Yantai West 烟台西

General information
- Location: Fushan District, Yantai, Shandong; China
- Coordinates: 37.65718°N 121.04941°E
- Lines: Longkou–Yantai railway Tianjin–Weifang–Yantai high-speed railway (U/C)

History
- Opened: 22 January 2018; 2024 (after renovation)
- Closed: 2019
Location

Yantai West railway station (Chinese: 烟台西站; pinyin: Yāntáixī zhàn) is a railway station in Fushan District, Yantai, Shandong, China. It was opened with the Longkou–Yantai railway on 22 January 2018. The station was closed in 2019 and will reopen with Tianjin–Weifang–Yantai high-speed railway (Weifang–Yantai section) in 2024.
