= Rushan, Shandong =

Rushan 乳山市
- County-level city
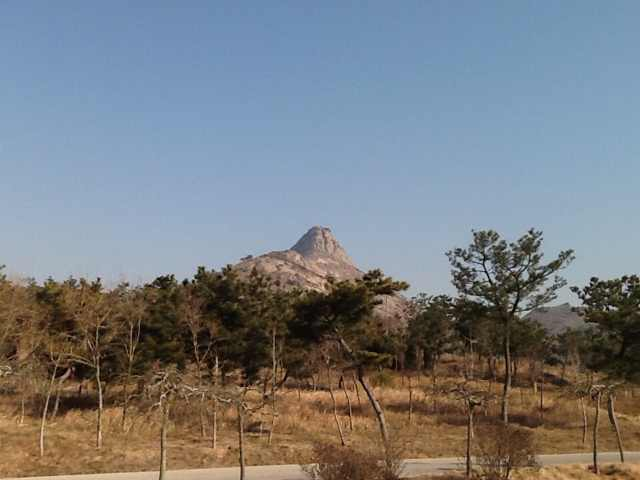
- Looking eastward to the eponymous Rushan (breast-shaped hill)

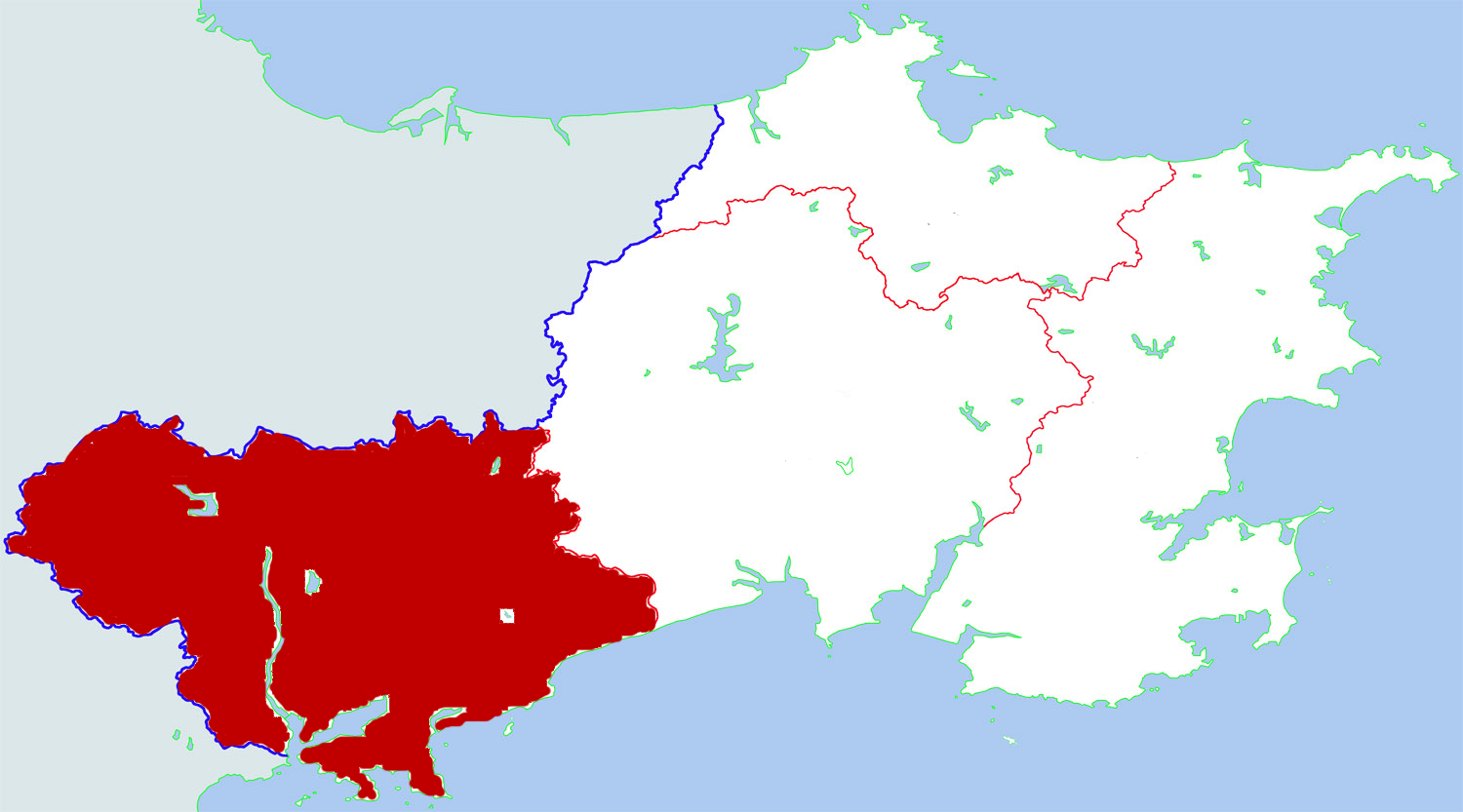
- Rushan in Weihai

- Location in Shandong
- Coordinates: 36°54′N 121°32′E
- Country: People's Republic of China
- Province: Shandong
- Prefecture-level city: Weihai
- County-level divisions: 4
- Township-level divisions: 66
- Municipal seat: Xiacun Village (36°54′55″N 121°32′11″E)

Area
  - County-level city: 1,665 km^{2} (643 sq mi)
  - Urban: 28.6 km^{2} (11.0 sq mi)
  - Metro: 28.6 km^{2} (11.0 sq mi)

Population (2019)
  - County-level city: 494,000
  - Density: 297/km^{2} (768/sq mi)
  - Urban: 280,000
  - Urban density: 9,800/km^{2} (25,000/sq mi)
  - Metro: 280,000
  - Metro density: 9,800/km^{2} (25,000/sq mi)
- Time zone: UTC+8 (China Standard)
- Postal code: 264500
- Area code: 631
- GDP: RMB32.1 billion (2010)
- GDP per capita: RMB56,026 (2010)
- License Plate Prefix: 鲁K
- Administrative division code: 371000
- ISO 3166-2: CN-37-10
- Website: rssq.rushan.gov.cn

Rushan, Shandong
- Chinese: 乳山
- Literal meaning: Breast Mountain(s)
Transcriptions
Standard Mandarin
- Hanyu Pinyin: Rǔshān
- Wade–Giles: Ju-shan

Rushan is a county-level city in the prefecture-level city of Weihai, Shandong province, People's Republic of China. Located on the Shandong Peninsula, Rushan borders Yantai to the north and looks out to the Yellow Sea to the south. As of the end of 2024, the total registered population of Rushan City is 508,413.

It derives its name from a breast-shaped hill on the seashore.

== History ==
Rushan City has a long history. The first county in Rushan City was founded in 206 B.C. and named "Yuli".

== Administrative divisions ==
The county-level city of Rushan administers 1 subdistricts and 14 towns.

Subdistricts

- Chengqu Subdistrict (城区街道)

Towns

- Xiacun (夏村镇)
- Rushankou (乳山口镇)
- Haiyangsuo (海阳所镇)
- Baishatan (白沙滩镇)
- Dagushan (大孤山镇)
- Nanhuang (南黄镇)
- Fengjia (冯家镇)
- Xiachu (下初镇)
- Wuji (午极镇)
- Yuli (育黎镇)
- Yazi (崖子镇)
- Zhuwang (诸往镇)
- Rushanzhai (乳山寨镇)
- Xujia (徐家镇)

== Geography and climate ==
Rushan is located on the south-eastern seashore of Shandong Province in China. It has a mild, seasonal climate moderated by the Yellow Sea. August is the warmest month with a 24-hour average temperature of 23.5 °C (74.3 °F) and January the coldest with 24-hour average temperature of 0 °C (32 °F).

It is within a two-hour flight from major Chinese cities such as Beijing and Shanghai. Large and medium-sized cities around it are Qingdao, Yantai and Weihai, all within one-hour-drive from Rushan. Qingdao-Weihai Expressway, State Highway 309 and the Taocun–Weihai railway run across Rushan. In the future, the city will be served by the Laixi–Rongcheng high-speed railway.

Climate data for Rushan, elevation 45 m (148 ft), (1991–2020 normals, extremes 1981–present)
Month	Jan	Feb	Mar	Apr	May	Jun	Jul	Aug	Sep	Oct	Nov	Dec	Year
Record high °C (°F)	13.3 (55.9)	19.5 (67.1)	27.5 (81.5)	30.0 (86.0)	33.7 (92.7)	37.5 (99.5)	37.1 (98.8)	37.0 (98.6)	37.1 (98.8)	29.4 (84.9)	22.9 (73.2)	18.1 (64.6)	37.5 (99.5)
Mean daily maximum °C (°F)	3.3 (37.9)	5.7 (42.3)	10.8 (51.4)	17.0 (62.6)	22.9 (73.2)	26.3 (79.3)	28.9 (84.0)	29.4 (84.9)	26.2 (79.2)	20.4 (68.7)	12.7 (54.9)	5.7 (42.3)	17.4 (63.4)
Daily mean °C (°F)	−1.9 (28.6)	0.3 (32.5)	5.1 (41.2)	11.4 (52.5)	17.4 (63.3)	21.7 (71.1)	25.1 (77.2)	25.3 (77.5)	20.9 (69.6)	14.5 (58.1)	7.3 (45.1)	0.6 (33.1)	12.3 (54.2)
Mean daily minimum °C (°F)	−5.8 (21.6)	−3.9 (25.0)	0.5 (32.9)	6.7 (44.1)	12.7 (54.9)	18.0 (64.4)	22.2 (72.0)	21.9 (71.4)	16.5 (61.7)	9.5 (49.1)	2.8 (37.0)	−3.4 (25.9)	8.1 (46.7)
Record low °C (°F)	−14.4 (6.1)	−14.1 (6.6)	−9.0 (15.8)	−4.1 (24.6)	3.4 (38.1)	10.0 (50.0)	15.9 (60.6)	11.5 (52.7)	7.7 (45.9)	−1.0 (30.2)	−7.0 (19.4)	−14.8 (5.4)	−14.8 (5.4)
Average precipitation mm (inches)	8.3 (0.33)	12.3 (0.48)	19.2 (0.76)	40.6 (1.60)	63.3 (2.49)	82.8 (3.26)	171.9 (6.77)	188.0 (7.40)	67.1 (2.64)	27.9 (1.10)	28.3 (1.11)	12.4 (0.49)	722.1 (28.43)
Average precipitation days (≥ 0.1 mm)	3.9	3.4	3.8	5.7	7.6	8.3	11.7	11.2	6.6	4.8	5.1	4.6	76.7
Average snowy days	6.4	4.1	1.7	0	0	0	0	0	0	0	1.7	6.7	20.6
Average relative humidity (%)	67	65	63	63	67	76	83	82	75	70	70	68	71
Mean monthly sunshine hours	178.8	176.7	219.1	228.8	248.9	206.7	172.9	197.3	212.1	212.7	177.2	172.8	2,404
Percentage possible sunshine	58	57	59	58	57	47	39	47	58	62	59	58	55
Source: China Meteorological Administration all-time August high

== Economy ==
Rushan has fulfilled 31.31 billion RMB Yuan of GDP (around five billion US dollars and about $9000 per capita) in 2010. The total fixed asset investment was 19.01 RMB Yuan and the local fiscal revenue reached 1.33 billion RMB Yuan. Rushan is thus ranked No. 55 among all the Chinese counties in terms of economic competitiveness.

With a coast of 185 kilometers long, Rushan is known for its varieties of shellfishes and rare fish species. The annual seafood production is more than 200 thousand tons. Rich in hilly land, Rushan becomes the principal fruit producing base in Jiaodong Peninsula. It is also abundant in gold and silver, producing over five tons of gold each year, which makes it the 5th biggest gold producing county/city in China and wins it the good reputation of "Gold Ridge and Silver Beach" in China.

Rushan has many scenic spots such as Silver Beach Resort and Da Rushan Coastal Resort (both are AAAA scenic spots at state level), Juyushan National Forest Park, Tangshang Hot Spring and Shengshui Palace (a Holy Land of Taoism).

== Education ==
Major elementary schools include: Rushan Number One Experimental Elementary School (乳山第一实验小学), Huangshanlu Elementary School (黄山路小学), and Rushan Number Two Experimental Elementary School (乳山第二实验小学). Major middle schools include: Rushan Fuqian Middle School (乳山市府前中学) and Rushan Yiyuan Middle School (乳山市怡园中学). Major high schools include: Rushan Number One High School (乳山市第一中学) and Rushan Golden Mountain High School (乳山市金岭中学).

== See also ==
- Breast-shaped hill
