= Yantai railway station =

Railway station in Yantai, China

Yantai 烟台
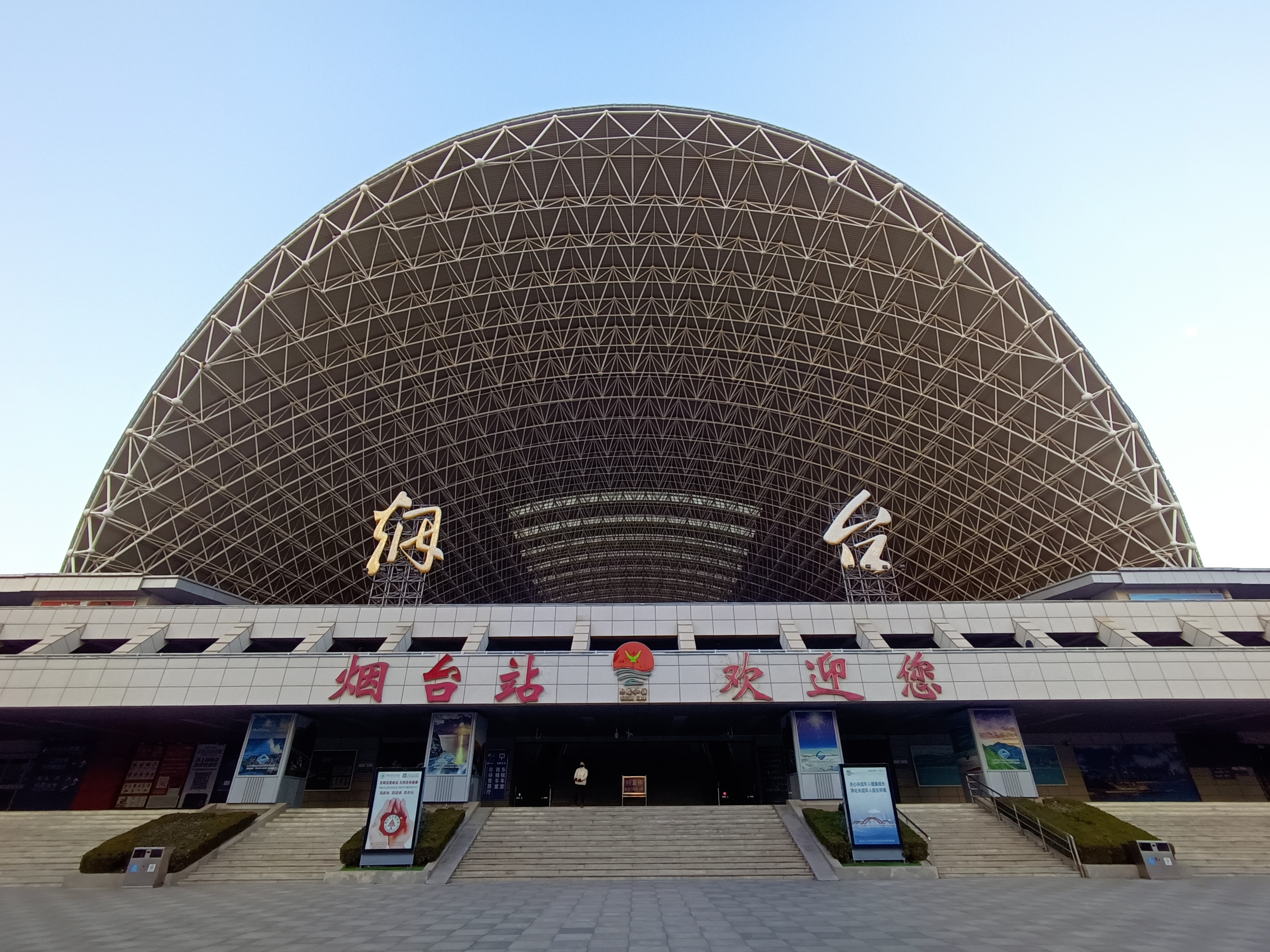
- Yantai Railway Station in 2023

General information
- Location: Zhifu District, Yantai, Shandong; China
- Coordinates: 37°32′51.46″N 121°22′39.68″E
- Operated by: China Railway Corporation
- Lines: Lancun–Yantai railway Qingdao–Rongcheng intercity railway (branch); Longkou–Yantai railway

History
- Opened: 1958
Location

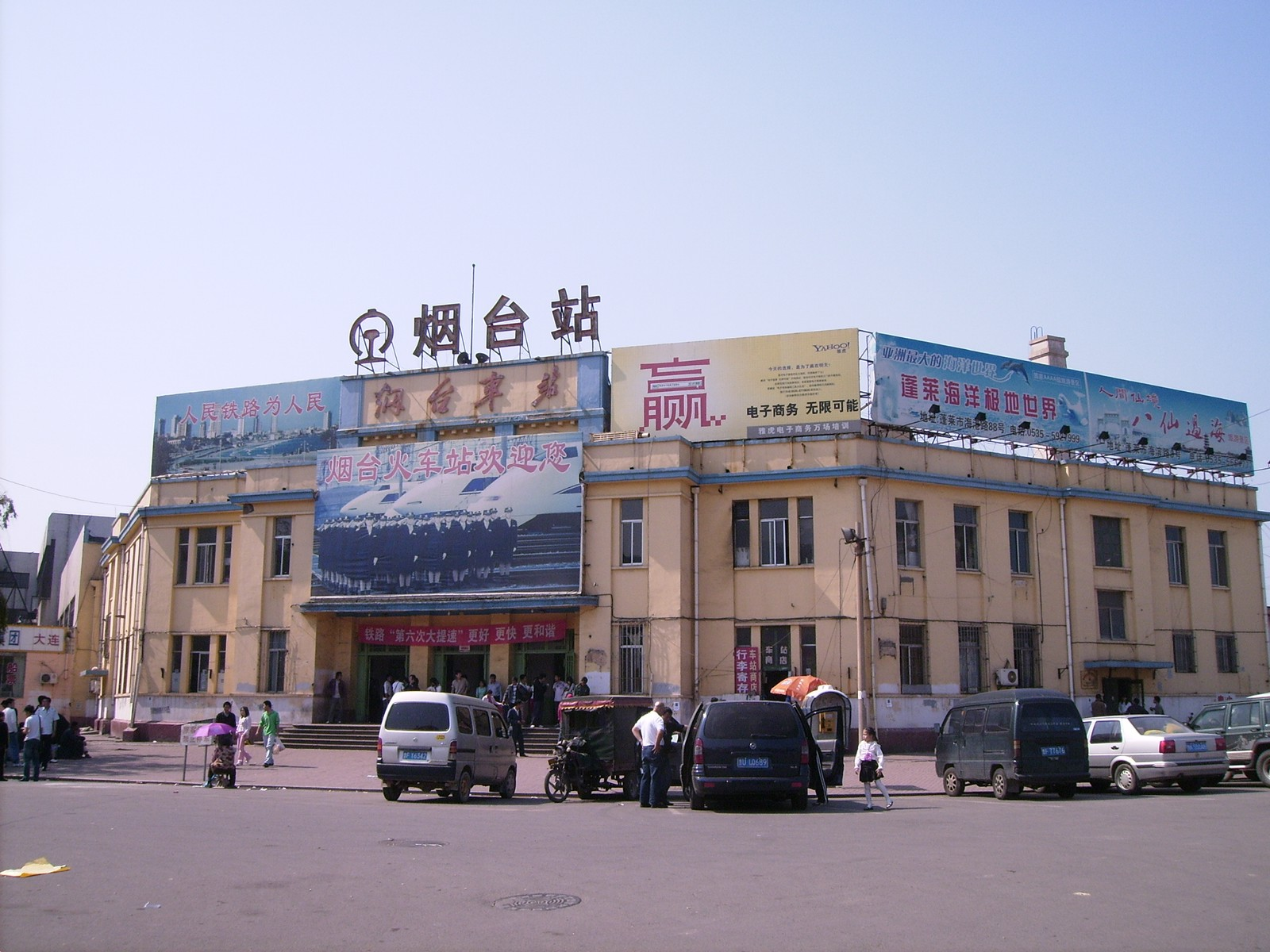
The station buildings in 2007

Yantai railway station is a railway station located in Zhifu District, Yantai, Shandong, China. It is a terminus for local trains and some high-speed trains. Other high-speed services call at Yantai South railway station instead.

== History ==
The railway station was opened in 1958.

Reconstruction of the station began on 6 September 2007 and was completed on 16 May, 2009. An official ceremony for the new station took place on 16 August 2009.
