= Dianbu =

Diànbù (店埠) may refer to the following locations in China:

- Dianbu, Anhui, town in Feidong County
- Dianbu, Shandong, town in Laixi
