= Jiang Duntao =

Chinese politician (born 1969)

- 江敦涛

Vice Mayor of Chongqing
- In office 18 January 2023 – 25 October 2025

Personal details
- Born: May 1969 (age 57) Laiyang, Shandong, China
- Party: Chinese Communist Party (expelled in 2026)

Jiang Duntao (Chinese: 江敦涛; born May 1969) is a former Chinese politician, who served as the vice mayor of Chongqing from 2023 to 2025. He was a representative of the 20th National Congress of the Chinese Communist Party.

== Career ==
Jiang was born in Laiyang, Shandong, with Jimo ancestry. His career is most at Qingdao, and he was served as the deputy secretary and secretary of the Communist Youth League Committee of Jimo, a standing committee member and the head of the publicity department of the Communist Youth League Committee of Qingdao, a standing committee member and the head of the organization department of the Communist Youth League Committee of Qingdao, and the deputy secretary and member of the party group of the Communist Youth League Committee of Qingdao.

Since October 2008, Jiang was served as a member of the standing committee of the CCP Chengyang District Committee and the head of the Organization Department, a member of the standing committee of the CCP Chengyang District Committee and the executive deputy district mayor of Chengyang District.

In March 2015, Jiang was appointed as the deputy party secretary and district mayor of Laoshan District. In January 2017, he was appointed as the party secretary of Laoshan District.

In August 2019, Jiang was appointed as the party secretary of Zibo. In July 2022, he was appointed as the party secretary of Weifang.

In January 2023, Jiang was appointed as the deputy mayor of Chongqing.

== Investigation ==
On 25 October 2025, Jiang was put under investigation for alleged "serious violations of discipline and laws" by the Central Commission for Discipline Inspection (CCDI), the party's internal disciplinary body, and the National Supervisory Commission, the highest anti-corruption agency of China. Jiang was expelled from the party and dismissed from the public offices on 13 April 2026.

Party political offices
Preceded by Tian Qingying	Party Secretary of Weifang; 2022–2023	Succeeded by Liu Yun (刘运)
Preceded by Zhou Lianhua	Party Secretary of Zibo; 2019–2022	Succeeded by Ma Xiaolei
