= Weifang–Suqian high-speed railway =

Railway line in China

Weifang–Suqian high-speed railway (Chinese: 潍宿高速铁路; pinyin: Wéi sù gāosù tiělù)

Overview
- Status: Under construction
- Termini: Weifang North; Yanghe North, near Suqian East
- Stations: 12

Service
- Type: High-speed rail
- System: China Railway
- Operator(s): CR Jinan Group, CR Shanghai Group

Technical
- Line length: 398 km (247 mi) (main route); 109 km (68 mi) (branch)
- Track gauge: 1,435 mm (4 ft 8 1/2 in) standard gauge
- Minimum radius: 7,000 m (23,000 ft) (normal); 5,500 m (18,000 ft) (difficult)
- Electrification: 25 kV 50 Hz AC (overhead line)
- Operating speed: 350 kilometres per hour (220 mph)
- Maximum incline: 2.0% (normal); 3.0% (difficult)

The Weifang–Suqian high-speed railway or Weisu high-speed railway (Chinese: 阳安铁路; pinyin: Wéi sù gāosù tiělù) is an important part of the Second Channel of the Beijing-Shanghai high-speed railway in the Eight Vertical and Eight Horizontal in China's medium and long-term railway network planning. The line starts from Weifang North railway station on the Jinan–Qingdao HSR, passes through Anqiu and Zhucheng in Weifang City, Wulian County and Ju County in Rizhao City, Yishui County and Yinan County in Linyi City, and enters Linyi North railway station on the Rizhao–Lankao HSR. It goes south through Lanling County and Tancheng County, enters Xinyi in Xuzhou City, Jiangsu province, and finally connects to the reserved Yanghe North station of the Xuzhou–Yancheng HSR in Suqian City. The total length is 398.296 km (247.490 mi), of which 324.744 km (201.787 mi) is in Shandong Province and 73.552 km (45.703 mi) is in Jiangsu Province. The connecting line from this line to Qingdao is being built simultaneously, starting from Qingdao West railway station in the east, and going west through Qingdao West Coast New Area of Qingdao City, Zhucheng City in Weifang City, and Wulian County in Rizhao City before connecting to this line. The length of the new line is 108.781 km (67.593 mi), all of which is within Shandong Province.

== History ==
On 5 July 2021, the first information announcement of the environmental impact assessment of the Weifang–Suqian high-speed railway was released.

On 29 May 2023, the National Development and Reform Commission approved the feasibility study report of the Weifang–Suqian HSR. On 8 August, the second environmental impact assessment information announcement was released. In November, the Ministry of Transport approved the impact assessment report on the planning conditions of the Weifang–Suqian HSR; the State Administration of Cultural Heritage issued an approval to implement the engineering design plan of the Weifang-Suqian high-speed railway (Xinyi–Suqian section) within the protection scope and construction control zone of the Grand Canal, a national key cultural relic protection site. On 1 December, the China Railway Group, the Shandong Provincial People's Government and the Jiangsu Provincial People's Government officially jointly approved the preliminary design of the project. On 29 December, the Jiangsu section of the Weifang–Suqian HSR started construction. On 30 December, the Shandong section and the Qingdao connecting line started construction.

On 27 December 2024, The Tianjin-Weihe-Suzhou High-Speed Railway Co., Ltd. was established in the Tianjin Free-Trade Zone, responsible for coordinating and promoting the construction, asset management, investment and financing of the Tianjin–Weifang–Yantai high-speed railway and the Weihe–Suzhou high-speed railway.
