= Yantai South railway station =

Railway station in Yantai, Shandong, China

Yantai South 烟台南
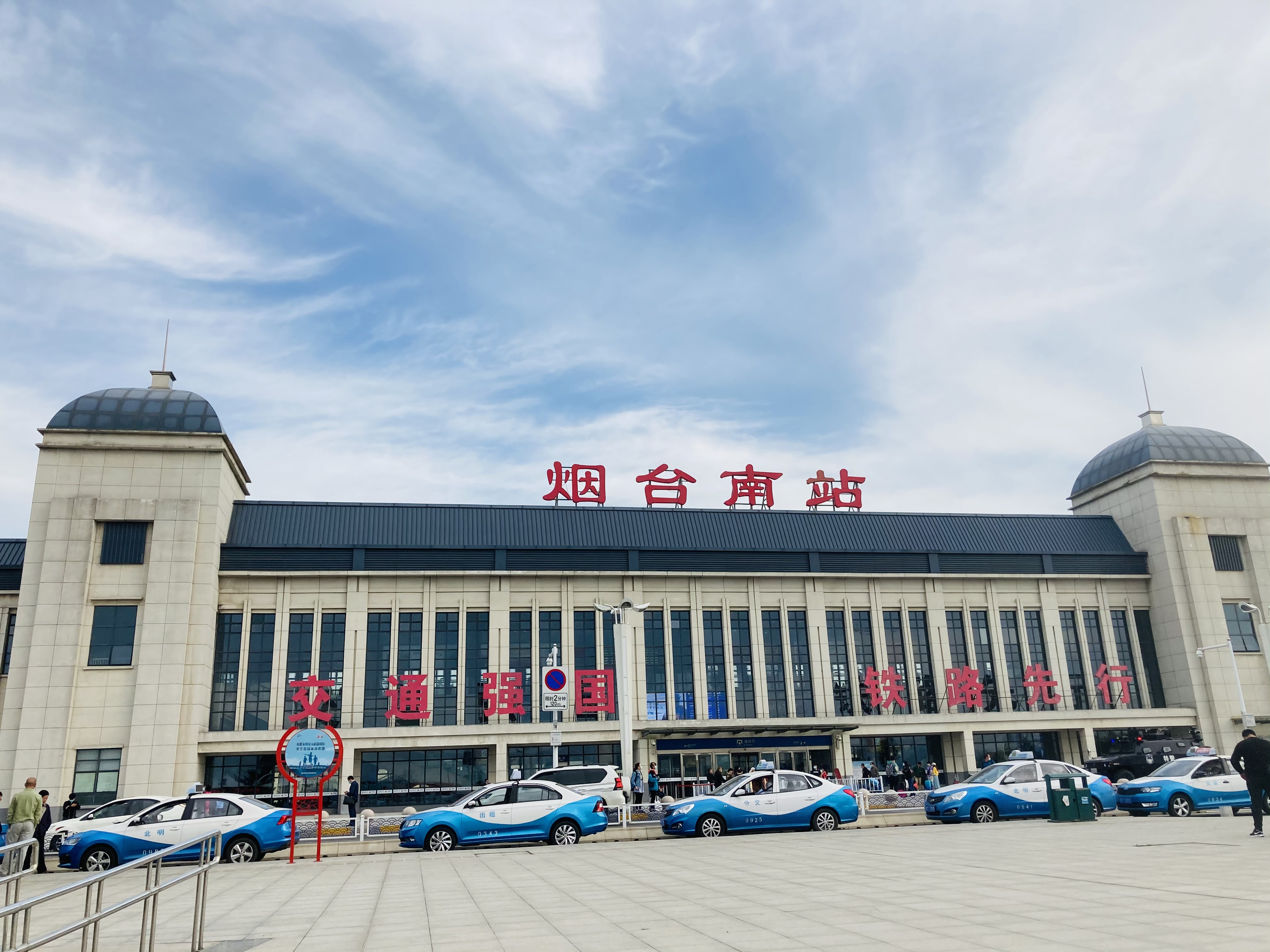

General information
- Location: Laishan District, Yantai, Shandong; China
- Coordinates: 37°25′53.82″N 121°23′13.87″E
- Lines: Qingdao–Rongcheng intercity railway Tianjin–Weifang–Yantai high-speed railway

History
- Opened: 28 December 2014
Location

Yantai South railway station (Chinese: 烟台南站; pinyin: Yāntái Nán zhàn) is a railway station located in Laishan District, Yantai, Shandong, China. Unlike the older Yantai railway station, this is a through-station. It opened with the Qingdao–Rongcheng intercity railway on 28 December 2014. It is also served by Tianjin–Weifang–Yantai high-speed railway.

Preceding station	China Railway High-speed	Following station
Taocun North towards Qingdao North	Qingdao–Rongcheng intercity railway	Muping towards Rongcheng
