= Nanhuang =

Nanhuang 南黄镇
- Town
- Location in Shandong
- Coordinates: 36°58′38″N 121°47′21″E
- Country: People's Republic of China
- Province: Shandong
- Prefecture-level city: Weihai
- County: Rushan
- Time zone: UTC+8 (China Standard)

Nanhuang (Chinese: 南黄镇) is an island and a town that is located in Rushan, Weihai, in the eastern Shandong province of China.
