= Xujia, Shandong =

Xujia 徐家镇
- Town
- Location in Shandong
- Coordinates: 36°54′44″N 121°45′41″E
- Country: People's Republic of China
- Province: Shandong
- Prefecture-level city: Weihai
- County: Rushan
- Time zone: UTC+8 (China Standard)

Xujia (Chinese: 徐家镇) is a town in Rushan, Weihai, in the eastern Shandong province of China.
