= Zhuwang =

Zhuwang 诸往镇
- Town
- Location in Shandong
- Coordinates: 36°58′42″N 121°22′29″E
- Country: People's Republic of China
- Province: Shandong
- Prefecture-level city: Weihai
- County: Rushan
- Time zone: UTC+8 (China Standard)

Zhuwang (Chinese: 诸往镇) is a town in Rushan, Weihai, in eastern Shandong province, China.
