= Laixi–Rongcheng high-speed railway =

High-speed rail line in Shandong, China

Laixi–Rongcheng high-speed railway 莱荣高速铁路

Overview
- Status: Operational
- Locale: Shandong Province, China
- Termini: Laixi; Rongcheng
- Stations: 7

Service
- Operator(s): China Railway Jinan Group

Technical
- Line length: 193 km (120 mi)
- Track gauge: 1,435 mm (4 ft 8 1/2 in)
- Operating speed: 350 km/h (217 mph)

The Laixi–Rongcheng high-speed railway is a high-speed rail line between Laixi and Rongcheng in Shandong Province, China.

== History ==
The railway was approved on 31 August 2020. Construction on the railway officially began on 31 October 2020. The railway opened on 8 December 2023.

== Route ==
The line is 193 kilometres (120 mi) long. It runs from west to east and will take a much more direct route between Laixi and Rongcheng than the existing Qingdao–Rongcheng intercity railway, which goes via Yantai.

== Stations ==
There are 7 stations:

- Laixi
- Laiyang South
- Haiyang
- Rushan South
- Weihai Nanhai
- Wendeng South
- Rongcheng
