= Rushanzhai =

Rushanzhai 乳山寨镇
- Town
- Location in Shandong
- Coordinates: 36°53′09″N 121°27′03″E
- Country: People's Republic of China
- Province: Shandong
- Prefecture-level city: Weihai
- County: Rushan
- Time zone: UTC+8 (China Standard)

Rushanzhai (Chinese: 乳山寨镇) is a town in Rushan, Weihai, in eastern Shandong province, China.
