= Tangezhuang =

Tangezhuang 谭格庄镇
- Town
- Location in Shandong
- Coordinates: 37°07′09″N 120°35′34″E
- Country: People's Republic of China
- Province: Shandong
- Prefecture-level city: Yantai
- County: Laiyang
- Time zone: UTC+8 (China Standard)

Tangezhuang (Chinese: 谭格庄镇) is a town in Laiyang, Yantai, in eastern Shandong province, China.
