= Fushan, Yantai =

Fushan District 福山区
- District
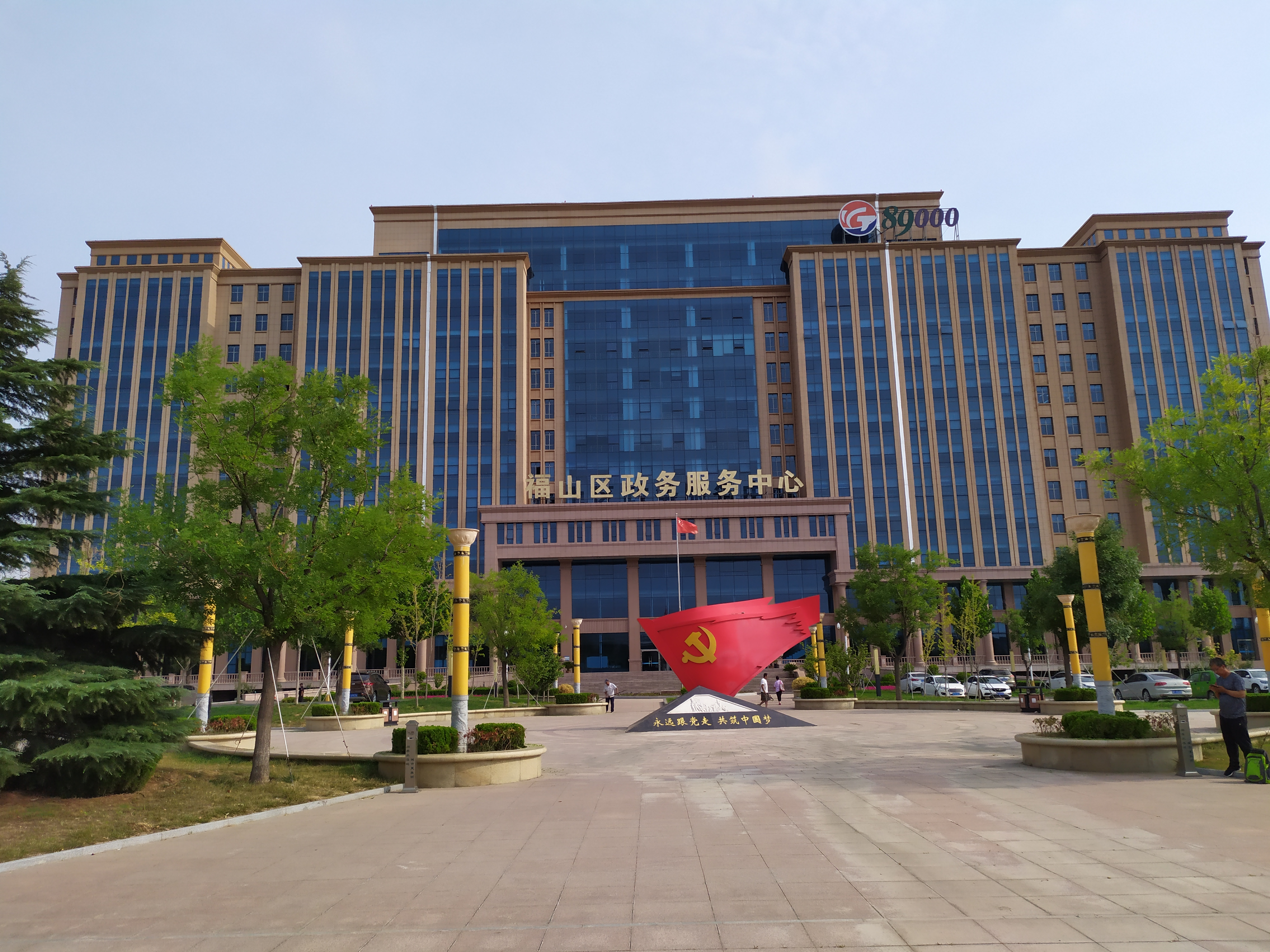
- Fushan Civic Hall

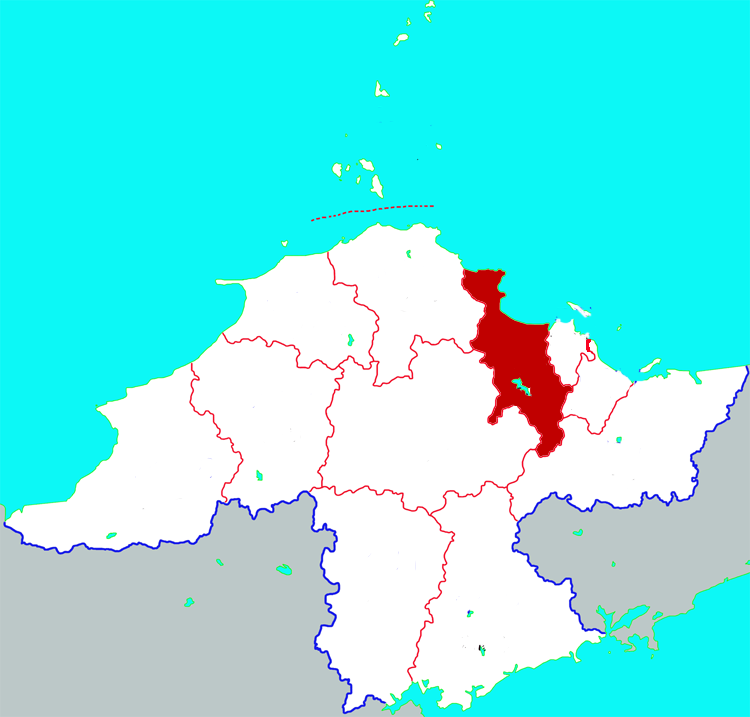
- Location in Yantai

- Location in Shandong
- Coordinates: 37°30′00″N 121°16′12″E
- Country: People's Republic of China
- Province: Shandong
- Prefecture-level city: Yantai

Area
  - Total: 482.83 km^{2} (186.42 sq mi)

Population (2019)
  - Total: 280,224
  - Density: 580.38/km^{2} (1,503.2/sq mi)
- Time zone: UTC+8 (China Standard)
- Postal code: 265500
- Website: www.ytfushan.gov.cn

Fushan (Chinese: 福山; pinyin: Fúshān) is a district of the city of Yantai, Shandong province, near the shore of the Bohai Gulf.

To the east is Zhifu District and Laishan District, to the southeast is Muping District, to the southwest Qixia City, to the northwest is Penglai City, and to the north is the Yantai Economic and Technological Development Zone.

The District of Fushan was mentioned in the Jackie Chan action film Police Story 3.

== Administrative divisions ==
As of 2012, this district is divided to 7 subdistricts and 3 towns.

Subdistricts

- Qingyang Subdistrict (清洋街道)
- Fuxin Subdistrict (福新街道)
- Guxian Subdistrict (古现街道)
- Dajijia Subdistrict (大季家街道)
- Bajiao Subdistrict (八角街道)
- Fulaishan Subdistrict (福莱山街道)
- Menlou Subdistrict (门楼街道)

Towns

- Gaotuan (高疃镇)
- Zhanggezhuang (张格庄镇)
- Huili (回里镇)
- Zangjiazhuang (臧家庄镇)

== Climate ==
Climate data for Fushan District, elevation 54 m (177 ft), (1991–2020 normals, extremes 1991–present)
| Month | Jan | Feb | Mar | Apr | May | Jun | Jul | Aug | Sep | Oct | Nov | Dec | Year |
|---|---|---|---|---|---|---|---|---|---|---|---|---|---|
| Record high °C (°F) | 15.9 (60.6) | 21.5 (70.7) | 29.1 (84.4) | 34.0 (93.2) | 38.7 (101.7) | 40.6 (105.1) | 39.5 (103.1) | 39.1 (102.4) | 36.2 (97.2) | 32.4 (90.3) | 27.4 (81.3) | 17.2 (63.0) | 40.6 (105.1) |
| Mean daily maximum °C (°F) | 2.8 (37.0) | 5.5 (41.9) | 11.6 (52.9) | 18.7 (65.7) | 24.7 (76.5) | 28.5 (83.3) | 30.3 (86.5) | 29.7 (85.5) | 26.2 (79.2) | 20.2 (68.4) | 12.5 (54.5) | 5.3 (41.5) | 18.0 (64.4) |
| Daily mean °C (°F) | −1.5 (29.3) | 0.5 (32.9) | 5.8 (42.4) | 12.7 (54.9) | 18.8 (65.8) | 23.0 (73.4) | 25.8 (78.4) | 25.5 (77.9) | 21.3 (70.3) | 14.9 (58.8) | 7.7 (45.9) | 1.1 (34.0) | 13.0 (55.3) |
| Mean daily minimum °C (°F) | −4.8 (23.4) | −3.1 (26.4) | 1.5 (34.7) | 7.9 (46.2) | 13.7 (56.7) | 18.5 (65.3) | 22.3 (72.1) | 22.2 (72.0) | 17.2 (63.0) | 10.6 (51.1) | 3.9 (39.0) | −2.2 (28.0) | 9.0 (48.2) |
| Record low °C (°F) | −14.3 (6.3) | −14.4 (6.1) | −8.4 (16.9) | −1.7 (28.9) | 4.5 (40.1) | 9.6 (49.3) | 14.6 (58.3) | 13.7 (56.7) | 8.4 (47.1) | 0.9 (33.6) | −6.8 (19.8) | −14.2 (6.4) | −14.4 (6.1) |
| Average precipitation mm (inches) | 11.4 (0.45) | 13.8 (0.54) | 15.8 (0.62) | 33.4 (1.31) | 54.1 (2.13) | 69.1 (2.72) | 153.7 (6.05) | 146.2 (5.76) | 53.1 (2.09) | 26.7 (1.05) | 31.1 (1.22) | 18.4 (0.72) | 626.8 (24.66) |
| Average precipitation days (≥ 0.1 mm) | 5.7 | 4.2 | 3.6 | 5.4 | 6.8 | 7.7 | 11.2 | 9.9 | 5.9 | 5.6 | 6.2 | 6.9 | 79.1 |
| Average snowy days | 8.9 | 5.5 | 1.8 | 0.3 | 0 | 0 | 0 | 0 | 0 | 0.1 | 2.5 | 9.1 | 28.2 |
| Average relative humidity (%) | 62 | 58 | 53 | 52 | 57 | 66 | 77 | 79 | 71 | 65 | 65 | 63 | 64 |
| Mean monthly sunshine hours | 173.5 | 185.7 | 239.8 | 251.7 | 277.1 | 251.1 | 217.5 | 226.2 | 227.4 | 216.1 | 172.3 | 162.7 | 2,601.1 |
| Percentage possible sunshine | 56 | 60 | 64 | 64 | 63 | 57 | 49 | 54 | 62 | 63 | 57 | 55 | 59 |
Source: China Meteorological Administrationall-time August record
