= Shanqiandian =

Shanqiandian 山前店镇
- Town
- Location in Shandong
- Coordinates: 37°00′59″N 120°52′33″E
- Country: People's Republic of China
- Province: Shandong
- Prefecture-level city: Yantai
- County: Laiyang
- Time zone: UTC+8 (China Standard)

Shanqiandian (Chinese: 山前店镇) is a town in Laiyang, Yantai, in eastern Shandong province, China.
