= Yazi =

Yazi 崖子镇
- Town
- Location in Shandong
- Coordinates: 37°04′49″N 121°18′12″E
- Country: People's Republic of China
- Province: Shandong
- Prefecture-level city: Weihai
- County: Rushan
- Time zone: UTC+8 (China Standard)

Yazi is a town in China.
