= Haiyangsuo =

Haiyangsuo 海阳所镇
- Town
- Location in Shandong
- Coordinates: 36°48′47″N 121°36′56″E
- Country: People's Republic of China
- Province: Shandong
- Prefecture-level city: Weihai
- County: Rushan
- Time zone: UTC+8 (China Standard)

Haiyangsuo (Chinese: 海阳所镇) is a town in Rushan, Weihai, in eastern Shandong province, China.
