= Zhanggezhuang =

Zhanggezhuang 张格庄镇
- Town
- Location in Shandong
- Coordinates: 37°22′35″N 121°11′13″E
- Country: People's Republic of China
- Province: Shandong
- Prefecture-level city: Yantai
- District: Fushan
- Time zone: UTC+8 (China Standard)

Zhanggezhuang (Chinese: 张格庄镇) is a town in Fushan, Yantai, in eastern Shandong province, China.
