= Binzhou railway station =

Railway station in Binzhou, Shandong

Binzhou 滨州站
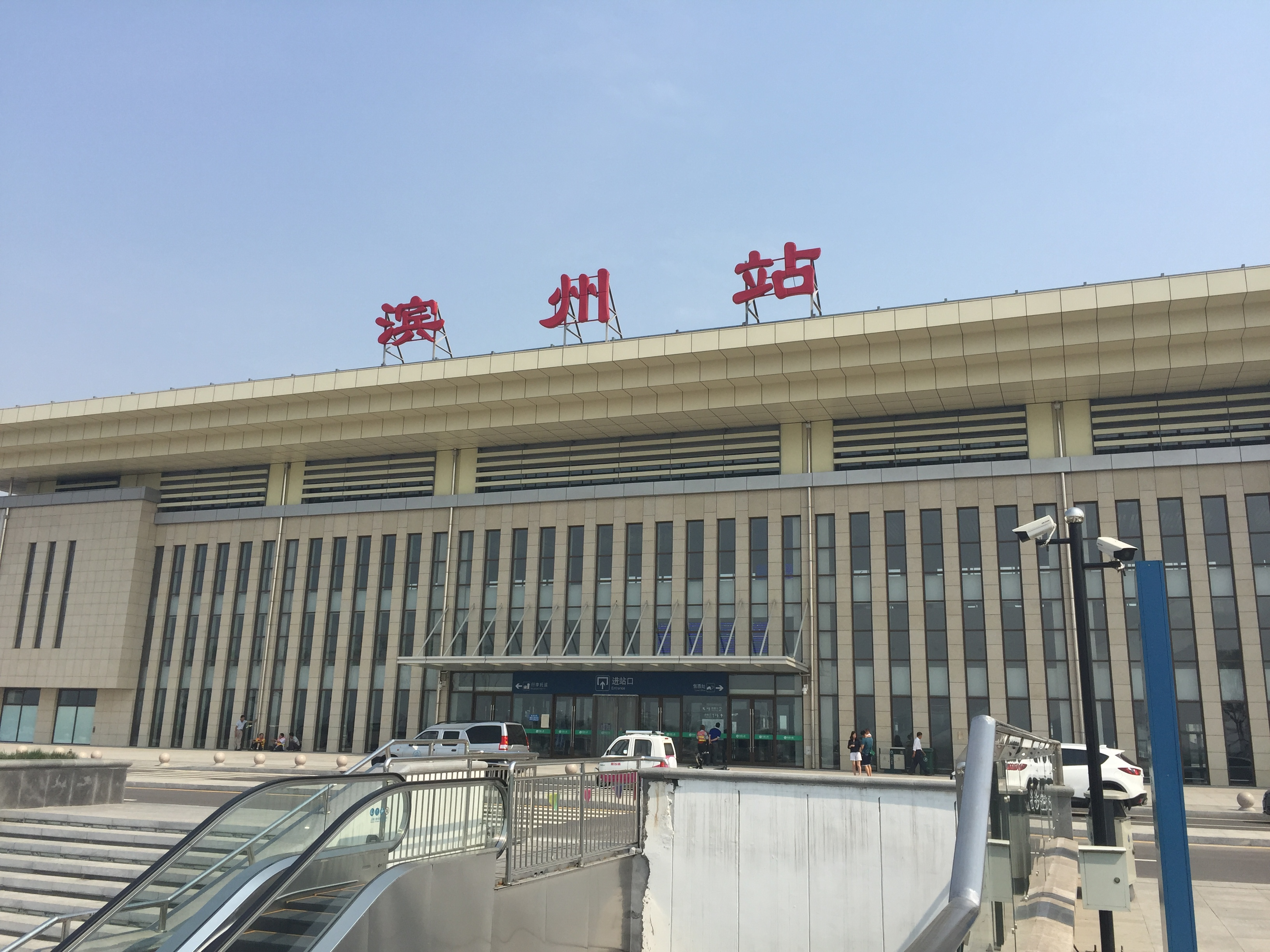

General information
- Location: Bincheng District, Binzhou, Shandong; China
- Coordinates: 37°27′10.97″N 118°0′44.3″E
- Lines: Dezhou–Dajiawa railway Tianjin–Weifang HSR (u/c)
- Platforms: 3

History
- Opened: September 28, 2015
Location

Binzhou railway station (Chinese: 滨州站) is a railway station in Bincheng District, Binzhou, Shandong, China.

== History ==
The station opened with the Dezhou–Dajiawa railway on 28 September 2015.
