= Zhaowangzhuang =

Zhaowangzhuang 照旺庄镇
- Town
- Location in Shandong
- Coordinates: 36°54′48″N 120°44′41″E
- Country: People's Republic of China
- Province: Shandong
- Prefecture-level city: Yantai
- County: Laiyang
- Time zone: UTC+8 (China Standard)

Zhaowangzhuang (Chinese: 照旺庄镇) is a town in Laiyang, Yantai, in eastern Shandong province, China.
