= Xuefang =

Xuefang 穴坊镇
- Town
- Location in Shandong
- Coordinates: 36°40′05″N 120°43′11″E
- Country: People's Republic of China
- Province: Shandong
- Prefecture-level city: Yantai
- County: Laiyang
- Time zone: UTC+8 (China Standard)

Xuefang (Chinese: 穴坊镇) is a town in Laiyang, Yantai, in eastern Shandong province, China.
