= Muyudian =

Muyudian 沐浴店镇
- Town
- Location in Shandong
- Coordinates: 37°02′03″N 120°45′18″E
- Country: People's Republic of China
- Province: Shandong
- Prefecture-level city: Yantai
- County-level city: Laiyang
- Time zone: UTC+8 (China Standard)

Muyudian (Chinese: 沐浴店镇) is a town in Laiyang, Yantai, in eastern Shandong province, China.
