= Tuanwang =

Tuanwang 团旺镇
- Town
- Location in Shandong
- Coordinates: 36°45′48″N 120°38′28″E
- Country: People's Republic of China
- Province: Shandong
- Prefecture-level city: Yantai
- County: Laiyang
- Time zone: UTC+8 (China Standard)

Tuanwang (Chinese: 团旺镇) is a town in Laiyang, Yantai, in eastern Shandong province, China.
