= Gaotuan =

Gaotuan 高疃镇
- Town
- Location in Shandong
- Coordinates: 37°28′14″N 121°12′03″E
- Country: People's Republic of China
- Province: Shandong
- Prefecture-level city: Yantai
- District: Fushan
- Time zone: UTC+8 (China Standard)

Gaotuan (Chinese: 高疃镇) is a town in Fushan, Yantai, in eastern Shandong province, China.
