= Dakuang =

Dakuang 大夼镇
- Town
- Location in Shandong
- Coordinates: 36°48′06″N 120°48′46″E
- Country: People's Republic of China
- Province: Shandong
- Prefecture-level city: Yantai
- County: Laiyang
- Time zone: UTC+8 (China Standard)

Dakuang (Chinese: 大夼镇) is a town in Laiyang, Yantai, in eastern Shandong province, China.
