= Gaogezhuang =

Gaogezhuang 高格庄镇
- Town
- Location in Shandong
- Coordinates: 36°43′14″N 120°46′05″E
- Country: People's Republic of China
- Province: Shandong
- Prefecture-level city: Yantai
- County: Laiyang
- Time zone: UTC+8 (China Standard)

Gaogezhuang (Chinese: 高格庄镇) is a town in Laiyang, Yantai, in eastern Shandong province, China.
