= Weifang–Laixi high-speed railway =

High speed rail line in China

Weifang–Laixi high-speed railway 潍莱高速铁路

Overview
- Status: Operating
- Termini: Weifang North; Laixi
- Stations: 4

Service
- Operator: China Railway Jinan Group

History
- Opened: 26 November 2020

Technical
- Line length: 126 km (78 mi)
- Track gauge: 1,435 mm (4 ft 8 1/2 in)
- Operating speed: 350 km/h (217 mph)

Weifang–Laixi high-speed railway is a high-speed railway in China. It opened on 26 November 2020.

The line is 126 kilometres (78 mi) long and has a design speed of 350 kilometres per hour (220 mph), though initially services are running at 300 kilometres per hour (190 mph).

== History ==
The final set of rails were installed on 9 May 2020. Testing began on 20 August.

== Route ==
The railway splits from the Jinan–Qingdao high-speed railway east of Weifang North and continues east. It passes to the south of Changyi and to the north of Pingdu city. South of Laixi city, the line meets the Qingdao–Rongcheng intercity railway.

== Stations ==
Station Name	Chinese	China Railway transfers/connections
Weifang North	潍坊北	Jinan–Qingdao high-speed railway
Changyi	昌邑	
Pingdu	平度	
Laixi	莱西	Qingdao–Rongcheng intercity railway
