= Baishatan =

Baishatan 白沙滩镇
- Town
- Location in Shandong
- Coordinates: 36°49′51″N 121°41′54″E
- Country: People's Republic of China
- Province: Shandong
- Prefecture-level city: Weihai
- County: Rushan
- Time zone: UTC+8 (China Standard)

Baishatan (Chinese: 白沙滩镇) is a town in Rushan, Weihai, in eastern Shandong province, China.
