= Rushankou =

Rushankou 乳山口镇
- Town
- Location in Shandong
- Coordinates: 36°52′12″N 121°30′18″E
- Country: People's Republic of China
- Province: Shandong
- Prefecture-level city: Weihai
- County: Rushan
- Time zone: UTC+8 (China Standard)

Rushankou (Chinese: 乳山口镇) is a town in Rushan, Weihai, in eastern Shandong province, China.

== Villages ==
Rushankou has the following thirty-six village-level divisions:

1. Zhujiazhuang (祝家庄村)
2. Gaizaokuang (改造夼村)
3. Qiganshi (旗杆石村)
4. Liujiazhuang (刘家庄村)
5. Qinjiazhuang (秦家庄村)
6. Nantangjia (南唐家村)
7. Beitangjia (北唐家村)
8. Lanjiazhuang (兰家庄村)
9. Diaojia (刁家村)
10. Zecun (择村村)
11. Lanjia (兰家村)
12. Fengzengshan (封增山村)
13. Tangjia (康家村)
14. Qianyinjia (前尹家村)
15. Houyinjia (后尹家村)
16. Hekou (河口村)
17. Xiwangjiazhuang (西王家庄村)
18. Xinzhuang (新庄村)
19. Zhaiqian (寨前村)
20. Chenjia (陈家村)
21. Xibeidao (西北岛村)
22. Jiangcunwa (江村洼村)
23. Guoshang (锅上村)
24. Yuanqian (院前村)
25. Zhangjiazhuang (张家庄村)
26. Anjia (安家村)
27. Xiaoqingdao (小青岛村)
28. Xinjian (新建村)
29. Maojia (毛家村)
30. Changtuan (常疃村)
31. Xinjiamiao (辛家庙村)
32. Yezi (野子村)
33. Xigengjia (西耿家村)
34. Zhuangtou (庄头村)
35. Lizizui (蜊子嘴村)
36. Xinanzhaojia (西南赵家村)
