= Xiachu =

Xiachu 下初镇
- Town
- Location in Shandong
- Coordinates: 37°01′58″N 121°36′19″E
- Country: People's Republic of China
- Province: Shandong
- Prefecture-level city: Weihai
- County: Rushan
- Time zone: UTC+8 (China Standard)

Xiachu (Chinese: 下初镇) is a town in Rushan, Weihai, in eastern Shandong province, China.
