= Laixi =

Laixi 莱西市 Laisi
- County-level city
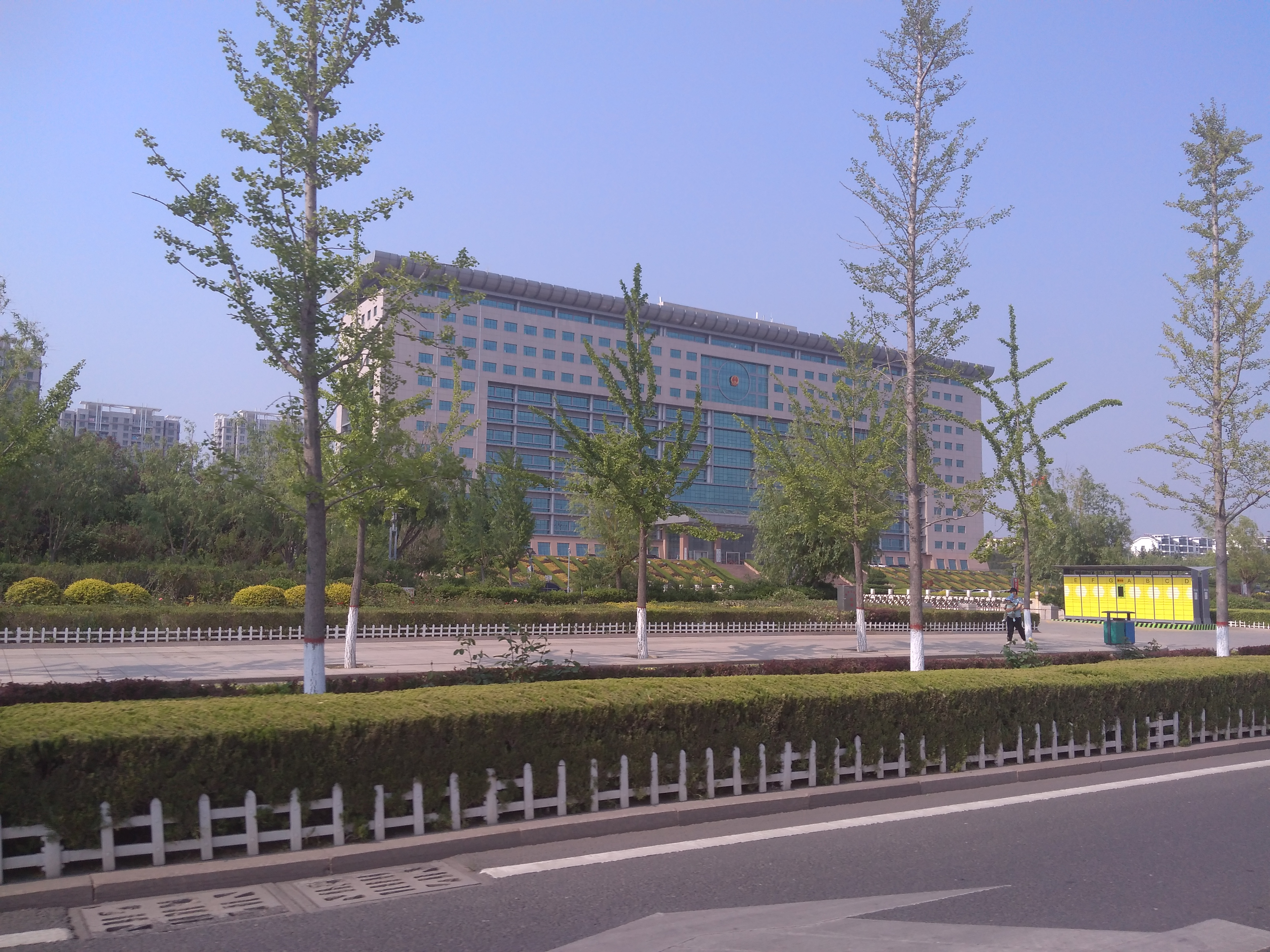
- Laixi Government Hall

- Location of Laixi within Qingdao

- Location in Shandong Laixi (China)
- Coordinates: 36°52′N 120°32′E
- Country: People's Republic of China
- Province: Shandong
- Sub-provincial city: Qingdao

Area
  - Total: 1,568.2 km^{2} (605.5 sq mi)

Population (2019)
  - Total: 762,400
- Time zone: UTC+8 (China Standard)
- Postal code: 266600

Laixi (simplified Chinese: 莱西; traditional Chinese: 萊西; pinyin: Láixī) is a county-level city of Qingdao sub-provincial city, Shandong Province, China.

Laixi is known as "Qingdao's Back Garden". Laixi was once combined with Laiyang, its neighbor to the north; however, Laixi is now the northernmost county-level division of Qingdao and Laiyang is the southernmost division of Yantai.

== Administrative divisions ==
As of 2012, this city is divided to 6 subdistricts and 11 towns.

Subdistricts

- Shuiji Subdistrict (水集街道)
- Wangcheng Subdistrict (望城街道)
- Longshui Subdistrict (龙水街道)
- Meihuashan Subdistrict (梅花山街道)
- Binhelu Subdistrict (滨河路街道)
- Guhe Subdistrict (沽河街道)

Towns

- Sunshou (孙受镇)
- Jiangshan (姜山镇)
- Xiagezhuang (夏格庄镇)
- Yuanshang (院上镇)
- Rizhuang (日庄镇)
- Nanshu (南墅镇)
- Hetoudian (河头店镇)
- Dianbu (店埠镇)
- Liquanzhuang (李权庄镇)
- Wubei (武备镇)
- Malianzhuang (马连庄镇)

== Transportation ==
The city is served by Laixi railway station on high-speed lines. Laixi South railway station sees infrequent service from conventional trains on the Lancun–Yantai railway.

== Climate ==
Climate data for Laixi, elevation 77 m (253 ft), (1991–2020 normals, extremes 1981–present)
Month	Jan	Feb	Mar	Apr	May	Jun	Jul	Aug	Sep	Oct	Nov	Dec	Year
Record high °C (°F)	15.0 (59.0)	20.4 (68.7)	27.8 (82.0)	33.6 (92.5)	36.4 (97.5)	39.9 (103.8)	38.2 (100.8)	37.8 (100.0)	36.5 (97.7)	30.8 (87.4)	25.8 (78.4)	16.8 (62.2)	39.9 (103.8)
Mean daily maximum °C (°F)	3.1 (37.6)	6.2 (43.2)	12.2 (54.0)	19.0 (66.2)	24.8 (76.6)	28.5 (83.3)	30.5 (86.9)	30.0 (86.0)	26.8 (80.2)	20.6 (69.1)	12.5 (54.5)	5.3 (41.5)	18.3 (64.9)
Daily mean °C (°F)	−2.5 (27.5)	0.0 (32.0)	5.6 (42.1)	12.4 (54.3)	18.4 (65.1)	22.7 (72.9)	25.8 (78.4)	25.4 (77.7)	21 (70)	14.4 (57.9)	6.7 (44.1)	−0.1 (31.8)	12.5 (54.5)
Mean daily minimum °C (°F)	−6.8 (19.8)	−4.7 (23.5)	0.2 (32.4)	6.6 (43.9)	12.8 (55.0)	17.9 (64.2)	22.2 (72.0)	21.7 (71.1)	16.1 (61.0)	9.0 (48.2)	2.0 (35.6)	−4.2 (24.4)	7.7 (45.9)
Record low °C (°F)	−21.1 (−6.0)	−17.1 (1.2)	−10.8 (12.6)	−5.6 (21.9)	0.6 (33.1)	7.5 (45.5)	13.8 (56.8)	11.8 (53.2)	5.2 (41.4)	−3.5 (25.7)	−9.4 (15.1)	−16.7 (1.9)	−21.1 (−6.0)
Average precipitation mm (inches)	7.7 (0.30)	12.4 (0.49)	15.8 (0.62)	36.2 (1.43)	56.9 (2.24)	84.8 (3.34)	160.8 (6.33)	167.9 (6.61)	54.1 (2.13)	26.6 (1.05)	26.9 (1.06)	9.9 (0.39)	660 (25.99)
Average precipitation days (≥ 0.1 mm)	3.2	3.7	3.6	5.2	6.8	8.1	11.7	11.6	6.7	4.9	5.0	4.7	75.2
Average snowy days	5.0	3.2	1.4	0.2	0	0	0	0	0	0	1.6	5.0	16.4
Average relative humidity (%)	69	65	59	58	64	71	80	82	75	71	71	70	70
Mean monthly sunshine hours	173.8	175.9	228.4	241.9	259.3	223.8	195.2	209.5	214.6	210.5	173.6	168.6	2,475.1
Percentage possible sunshine	56	57	61	61	59	51	44	50	58	61	57	57	56
Source: China Meteorological Administrationall-time extreme temperatureall-time August high
