= Zhifu, Yantai =

Zhifu District 芝罘区 Chefoo
- District
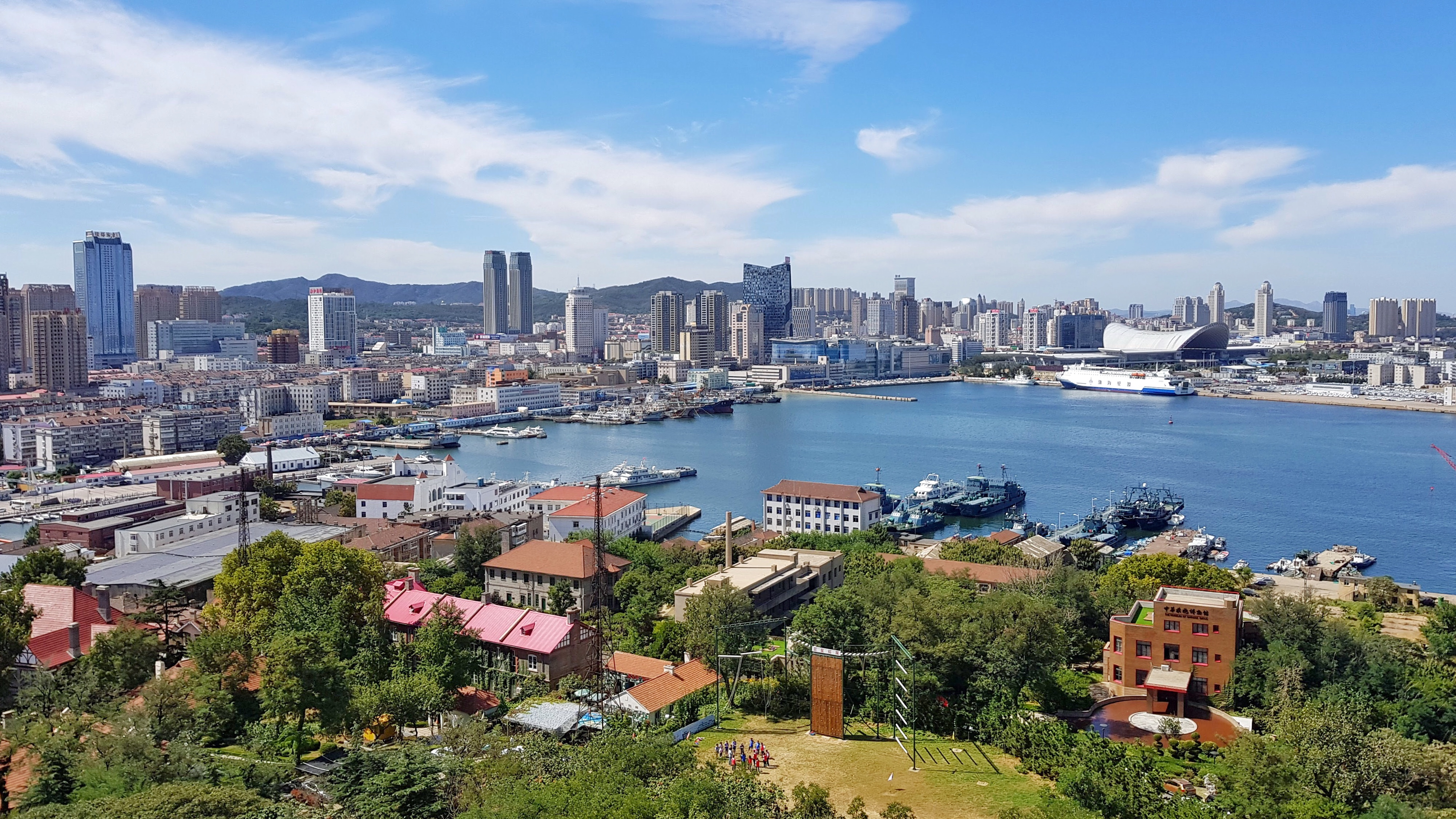
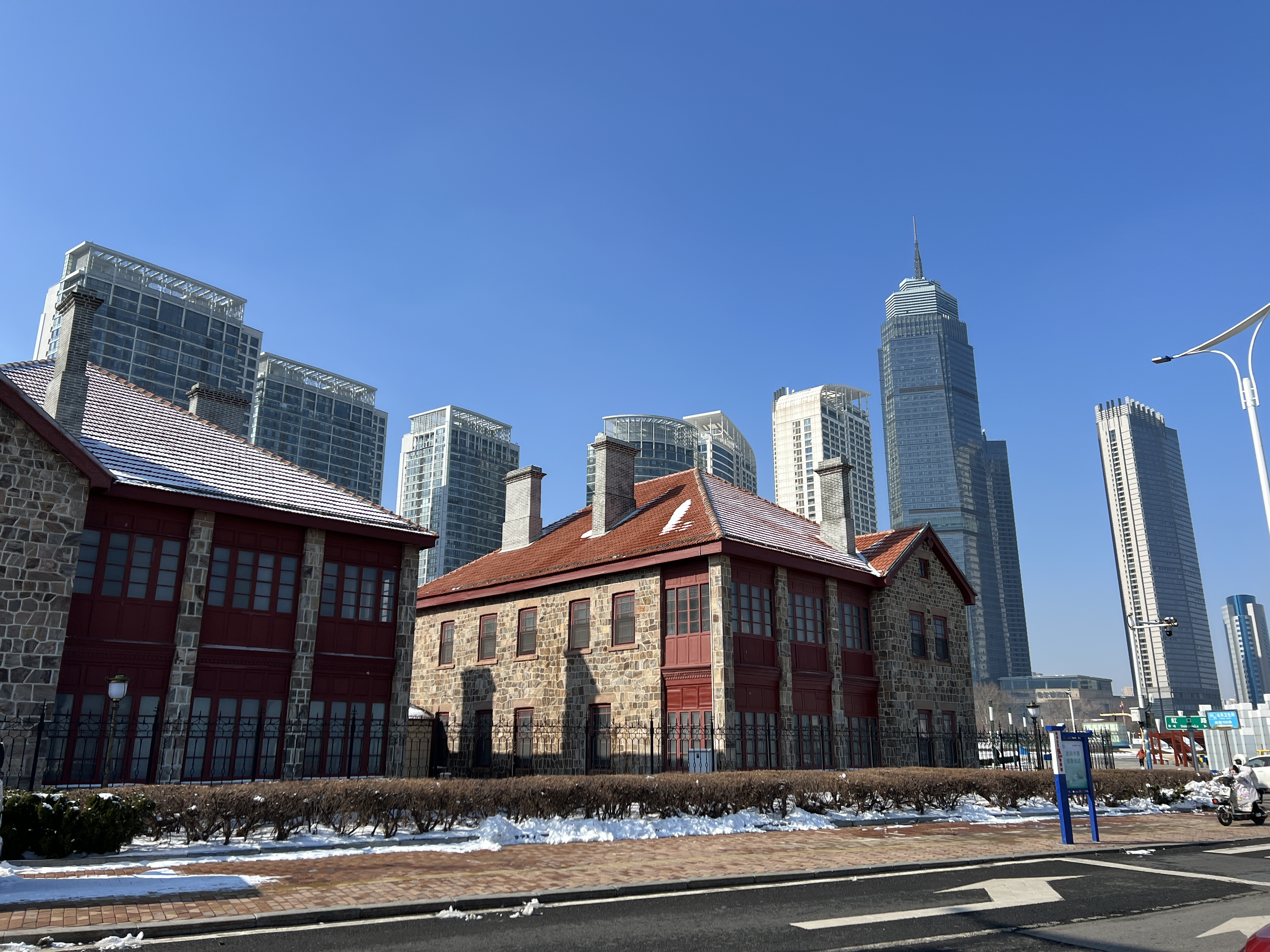
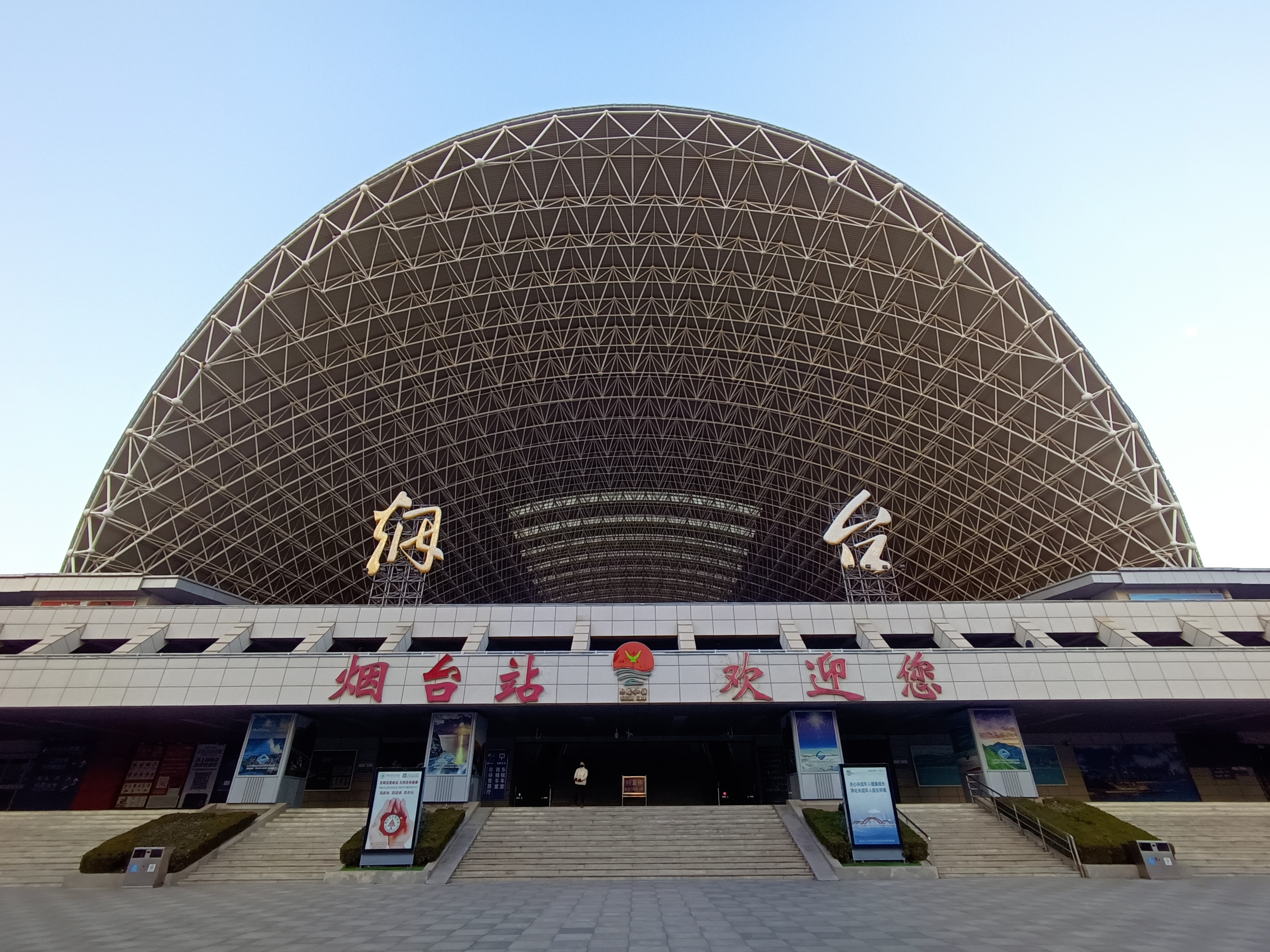
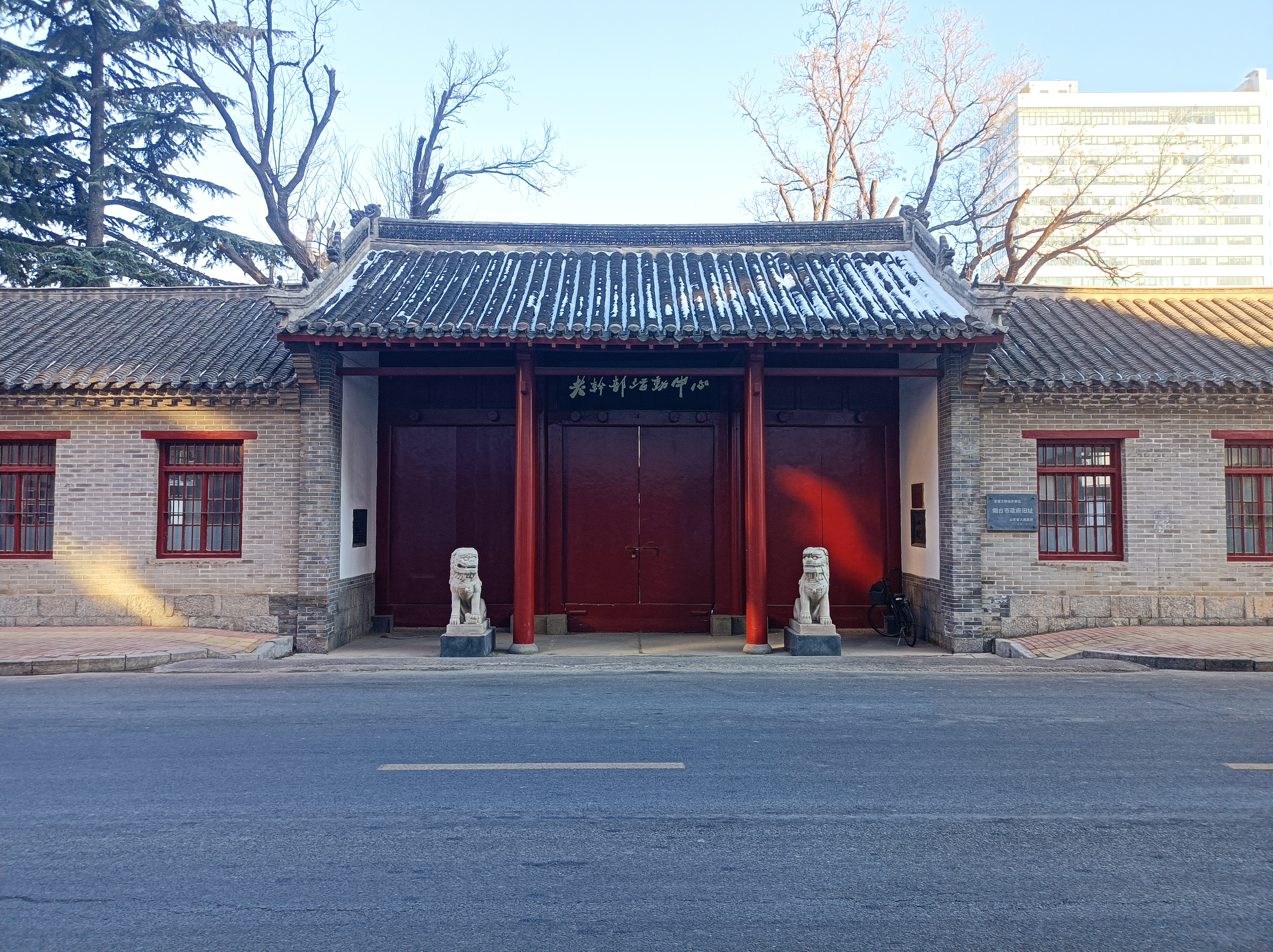
- View of Zhifu Bay Former foreign settlement Yantai railway station Old city hall

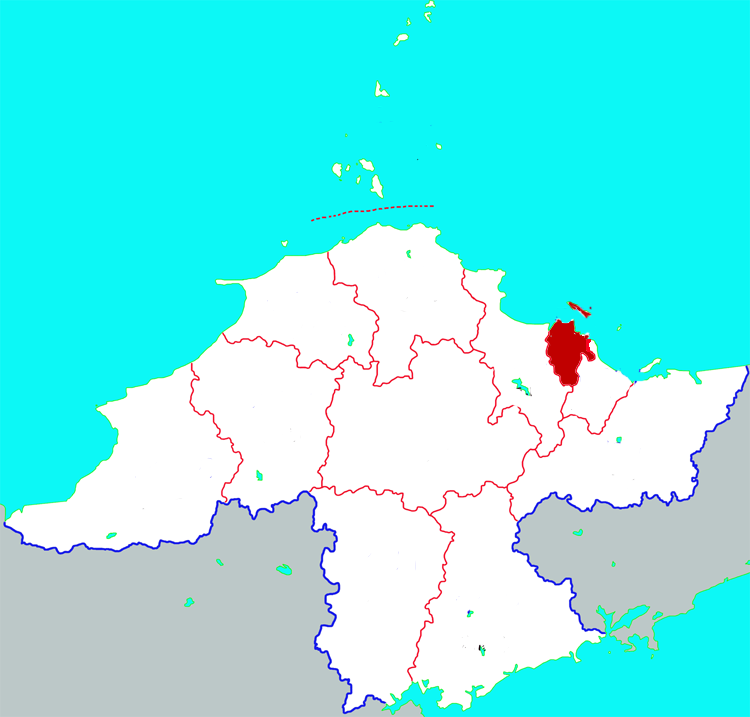
- Location in Yantai

- Location in Shandong
- Coordinates: 37°32′13″N 121°24′05″E
- Country: People's Republic of China
- Province: Shandong
- Prefecture-level city: Yantai

Area
  - Total: 179.2 km^{2} (69.2 sq mi)

Population (2017)
  - Total: 701,000
  - Density: 3,910/km^{2} (10,100/sq mi)
- Time zone: UTC+8 (China Standard)
- Postal code: 264001
- Website: www.zhifu.gov.cn

Zhifu, Yantai
- Traditional Chinese: 芝罘區
- Simplified Chinese: 芝罘区
Transcriptions
Standard Mandarin
- Hanyu Pinyin: Zhīfú Qū
- Wade–Giles: Chih-fu Ch‘ü
Yue: Cantonese
- Jyutping: zi^{1}fau^{4} keoi^{1}

Zhifu District is an urban district and previous municipal seat of the prefecture-level city of Yantai in Shandong Province, China. Zhifu is the center of Yantai, Yangtai Mountain, Yantai Port and former city hall are all located in this district.

== Name ==
Zhifu gets its name from the land-tied island on its coast, whose shape is like a lingzhi, thus it was called 'zhi' (芝), and 'fu' (罘) means a barrier. This name was first recorded when Qin Shi Huang sent his fleet for elixir of life.

Zhifu opened its port in 1861, after which it had frequent interactions with western countries, and its name was romanized in various ways as Chefoo, Che-foo, Chi-fu, and Chih-fou. Although this name was used for the city by foreigners prior to the Communist victory in the Chinese Civil War, the locals referred to the settlement as Yantai (q.v.) throughout.

== History ==
The area was inhabited as early as the Neolithic period by the Dongyi people. It was part of Qi County during the Qin dynasty. Formerly a small unwalled fishing village, Zhifu grew when its harbor was chosen to act as the international port for the larger city of Tengchow (now Penglai) nearby. It now forms part of the urban core of Yantai.

After the Second Opium War, the Qing government opened its 13 cities for trade, and Zhifu was included. Thereafter, a total of 17 countries, including Britain, France, and the United States, successively established consulates in Zhifu.

On February 14, 1862, the Deng-Lai-Qing Military Circuit (登萊青兵備道) was relocated from Laizhou Prefecture to Zhifu, with Circuit Intendant Chongfang concurrently serving as Superintendent of the Dong Customs.

In 1877, Chefoo International Settlement was open.

== Administrative divisions ==
As of 2012, this district is divided to 12 subdistricts.

Subdistricts

- Xiangyang Subdistrict (向阳街道)
- Dongshan Subdistrict (东山街道)
- Yuhuang Subdistrict (毓璜顶街道)
- Tongshen Subdistrict (通伸街道)
- Fenghuangtai Subdistrict (凤凰台街道)
- Qishan Subdistrict (奇山街道)
- Baishi Subdistrict (白石街道)
- Zhifu Island Subdistrict (芝罘岛街道)
- Huangwu Subdistrict (黄务街道)
- Zhichu Subdistrict (只楚街道)
- Shihuiyao Subdistrict (世回尧街道)
- Xingfu Subdistrict (幸福街道)

== Education ==
As of the end of 2018, Zhifu District had a total of 5 secondary vocational schools with 8,764 enrolled students; 1 senior high school with 2,696 students; 6 complete middle schools (offering both junior and senior high school education) with 23,085 students; 2 twelve-year integrated schools (covering primary to high school) with 5,617 students; 7 nine-year integrated schools (covering primary to junior high) with 10,267 students; 12 junior high schools with 9,172 students; 40 primary schools with 34,726 students; and 114 kindergartens with 24,775 children. Additionally, there were 2 special education schools serving 257 students.

Chefoo School, which was established by American Presbyterian missionaries aiming to educate foreign children, was in Zhifu previously; it terminated in 1951, after the communist established the regime.
