= Longkou–Yantai railway =

Railway line in Shandong, China

Overview
- Native name: 龙烟铁路
- Status: Operational
- Termini: Longkou West; Zhuji

History
- Opened: 19 December 2017

Technical
- Line length: 113 km (70 mi)
- Track gauge: 1,435 mm (4 ft 8 1/2 in) standard gauge

The Longkou–Yantai railway (Chinese: 龙烟铁路; pinyin: Lóng–Yān tiělù) is a railway line in Yantai, Shandong, China.

== History ==
Construction of the line began in November 2013 and was completed in October 2017. The line opened on 19 December 2017. Passenger services were introduced on 22 January 2018.

== Route ==
The line is 113 kilometres (70 miles) long and has a maximum speed of 160 kilometres per hour (99 miles per hour). The line starts at Longkou West railway station on the Dajiawa–Laizhou–Longkou railway. and continues east. It end at Zhuji railway station on the Lancun–Yantai railway.
