= Dianbu, Shandong =

Dianbu 店埠镇
- Town
- Location in Shandong Dianbu (China)
- Coordinates: 36°41′57″N 120°20′53″E
- Country: People's Republic of China
- Province: Shandong
- Sub-provincial city: Qingdao
- County-level city: Laixi
- Elevation: 37 m (121 ft)
- Time zone: UTC+8 (China Standard)
- Area code: 0532

Dianbu (Chinese: 店埠; pinyin: Diànbù) is a town under the administration of Laixi City in eastern Shandong province, China, located about 25 kilometres (16 mi) southwest of downtown Laixi. As of 2011, it has 66 villages under its administration.

== See also ==
- List of township-level divisions of Shandong
