= Bincheng, Binzhou =

Bincheng 滨城区
- District
- Location in Shandong
- Coordinates: 37°25′48″N 118°01′27″E
- Country: People's Republic of China
- Province: Shandong
- Prefecture-level city: Binzhou

Area
  - Total: 1,041 km^{2} (402 sq mi)

Population (2020 census)
  - Total: 853,649
  - Density: 820.0/km^{2} (2,124/sq mi)
- Time zone: UTC+8 (China Standard)
- Postal code: 256600

Bincheng (simplified Chinese: 滨城区; traditional Chinese: 濱城區; pinyin: Bīnchéng Qū) is a district and seat of the city of Binzhou, Shandong province, China. It has an area of 1,042 km^{2} (402 sq mi) and 853,649 inhabitants (2020).

== Administrative divisions ==
As of 2012, this district is divided to 11 subdistricts, 2 towns and 2 townships.

Subdistricts

- Shizhong Subdistrict (市中街道)
- Shixi Subdistrict (市西街道)
- Beizhen Subdistrict (北镇街道)
- Shidong Subdistrict (市东街道)
- Pengli Subdistrict (彭李街道)
- Xiaoying Subdistrict (小营街道)
- Binbei Subdistrict (滨北街道)
- Liangcai Subdistrict (梁才街道)
- Dudian Subdistrict (杜店街道)
- Shahe Subdistrict (沙河街道)
- Lize Subdistrict (里则街道)

Towns

- Jiuzhen (旧镇镇)
- Puji (堡集镇)

Townships

- Shangji Township (尚集乡)
- Qinhuangtai Township (秦皇台乡)
