= Laiyang =

Laiyang 莱阳市
- County-level city
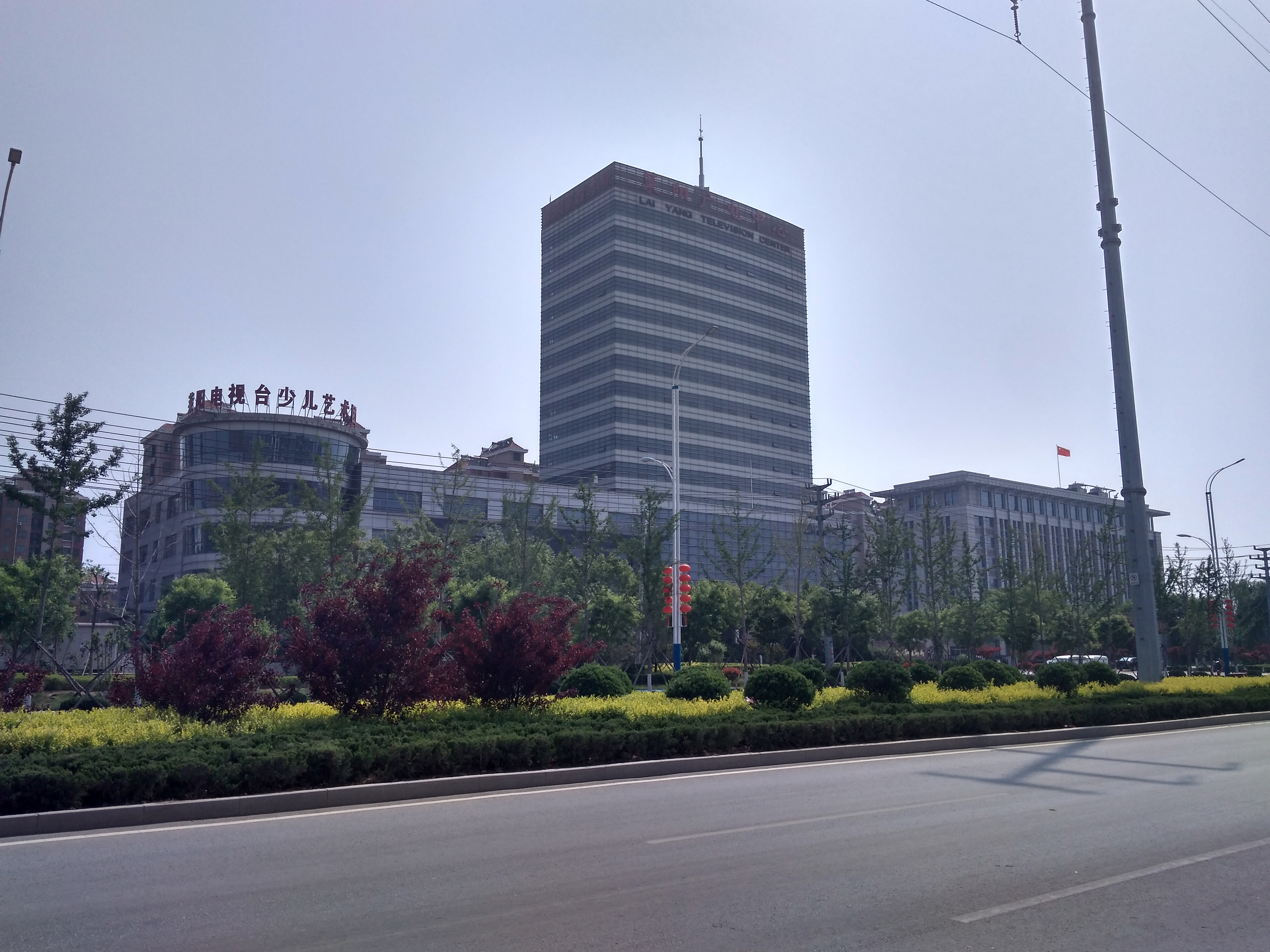

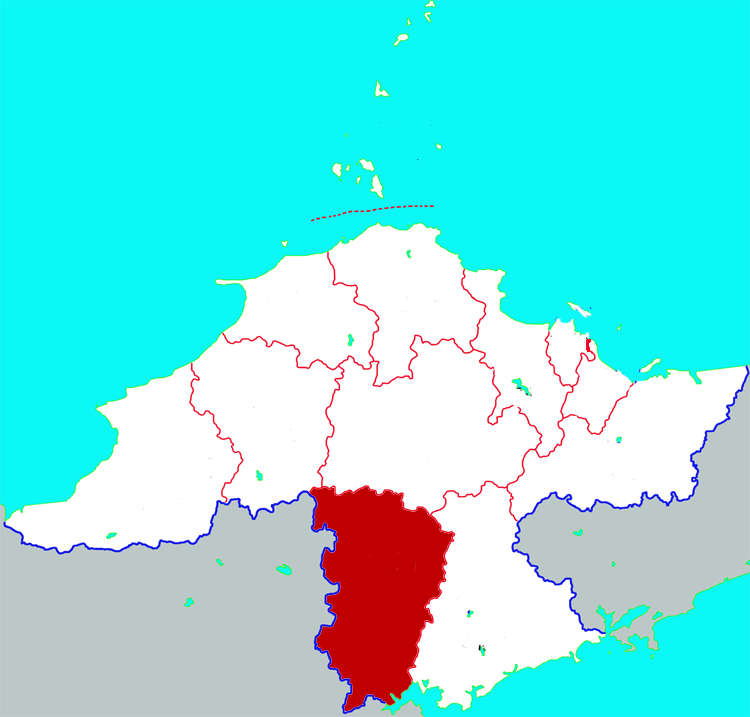
- Location in Yantai

- Location in Shandong
- Coordinates: 36°58′33″N 120°42′49″E
- Country: People's Republic of China
- Province: Shandong
- Prefecture-level city: Yantai

Area
  - Total: 1,734 km^{2} (670 sq mi)

Population (2020)
  - Total: 872,000
- Time zone: UTC+8 (China Standard)
- Postal code: 265200
- Website: www.laiyang.gov.cn

Laiyang city (simplified Chinese: 莱阳; traditional Chinese: 萊陽; pinyin: Láiyáng) is a county-level city within Yantai bordering Qingdao, located in the middle of the Shandong Peninsula, in Shandong province, China. The majority (70%) of its population are farmers and it is famous for producing the Laiyang pear. As of 2010, it had a population of 923,000.

== Administrative divisions ==
As of 2012, this city is divided into 4 subdistricts and 14 towns.

Subdistricts

- Chengxiang Subdistrict (城厢街道)
- Guliu Subdistrict (古柳街道)
- Longwangzhuang Subdistrict (龙旺庄街道)
- Fenggezhuang Subdistrict (冯格庄街道)

Towns

- Muyudian (沐浴店镇)
- Tuanwang (团旺镇)
- Xuefang (穴坊镇)
- Yangjun (羊郡镇)
- Jiangtuan (姜疃镇)
- Wandi (万第镇)
- Zhaowangzhuang (照旺庄镇)
- Tangezhuang (谭格庄镇)
- Bolinzhuang (柏林庄镇)
- Heluo (河洛镇)
- Lügezhuang (吕格庄镇)
- Gaogezhuang (高格庄镇)
- Dakuang (大夼镇)
- Shanqiandian (山前店镇)

== Economy ==
According to the official website of the Laiyang Municipal People's Government

In 2022, Laiyang's GDP will be 51 billion yuan, an increase of 4.1% year-on-year at comparable prices. Among them, the added value of the primary industry was 6.458 billion yuan, up by 5.7 percent; the added value of the secondary industry was 21.517 billion yuan, up by 6.3 percent; the added value of the tertiary industry was 23.025 billion yuan, up by 1.7 percent. The structure of the three industries was adjusted to 12.7: 42.2: 45.1.

In 2023, Laiyang's GDP will be 51.439 billion yuan, a year-on-year increase of 5.2% at constant prices. By industry, the added value of the primary industry was 6.596 billion yuan, up by 5.3 percent year-on-year; the added value of the secondary industry was 21.319 billion yuan, a year-on-year increase of 5.5%; the added value of the tertiary industry was 23.524 billion yuan, a year-on-year increase of 4.8%. The structure of the three industries was adjusted to 12.8: 41.5: 45.7.

Famous enterprises: Longda Group, Luhua Group

== Population ==
At the end of 2020, according to the seventh national census, the total permanent population of Laiyang City was 791,400, a decrease of 0.5%. Among them, the permanent urban population is 427,800. The urbanization rate of permanent residents was 54.06%, an increase of 0.52% over the previous year.

At the end of 2010, the total population of the city was 878,600, of which 151,900 were non-agricultural.

== Climate ==
Climate data for Laiyang, elevation 42 m (138 ft), (1991–2020 normals, extremes 1981–present)
Month	Jan	Feb	Mar	Apr	May	Jun	Jul	Aug	Sep	Oct	Nov	Dec	Year
Record high °C (°F)	14.4 (57.9)	20.8 (69.4)	28.3 (82.9)	33.8 (92.8)	36.7 (98.1)	40.0 (104.0)	38.4 (101.1)	38.4 (101.1)	36.0 (96.8)	31.8 (89.2)	26.0 (78.8)	17.3 (63.1)	40.0 (104.0)
Mean daily maximum °C (°F)	3.3 (37.9)	6.3 (43.3)	12.3 (54.1)	19.2 (66.6)	24.9 (76.8)	28.4 (83.1)	30.4 (86.7)	30.0 (86.0)	26.9 (80.4)	20.8 (69.4)	12.7 (54.9)	5.5 (41.9)	18.4 (65.1)
Daily mean °C (°F)	−2.4 (27.7)	0.1 (32.2)	5.5 (41.9)	12.4 (54.3)	18.4 (65.1)	22.5 (72.5)	25.7 (78.3)	25.3 (77.5)	20.9 (69.6)	14.3 (57.7)	6.7 (44.1)	0.0 (32.0)	12.5 (54.4)
Mean daily minimum °C (°F)	−6.8 (19.8)	−4.8 (23.4)	0.1 (32.2)	6.6 (43.9)	12.7 (54.9)	17.8 (64.0)	22.0 (71.6)	21.6 (70.9)	16.1 (61.0)	8.9 (48.0)	1.9 (35.4)	−4.2 (24.4)	7.7 (45.8)
Record low °C (°F)	−20.5 (−4.9)	−17.1 (1.2)	−11.8 (10.8)	−5.2 (22.6)	1.2 (34.2)	7.3 (45.1)	13.9 (57.0)	11.2 (52.2)	4.8 (40.6)	−3.6 (25.5)	−9.8 (14.4)	−15.6 (3.9)	−20.5 (−4.9)
Average precipitation mm (inches)	6.3 (0.25)	11.4 (0.45)	15.9 (0.63)	33.3 (1.31)	58.7 (2.31)	79.0 (3.11)	171.6 (6.76)	160.7 (6.33)	58.8 (2.31)	26.8 (1.06)	23.8 (0.94)	9.3 (0.37)	655.6 (25.83)
Average precipitation days (≥ 0.1 mm)	3.0	3.0	3.5	5.1	6.8	7.9	11.6	11.7	6.6	4.8	4.6	4.4	73
Average snowy days	5.1	3.3	1.3	0.2	0	0	0	0	0	0	1.6	5.4	16.9
Average relative humidity (%)	67	62	57	57	63	72	81	82	74	70	70	69	69
Mean monthly sunshine hours	173.5	178.1	227.3	235.9	259.7	222.4	189.7	206.4	216.7	212.3	171.9	163.2	2,457.1
Percentage possible sunshine	56	58	61	60	59	51	43	50	59	62	57	55	56
Source: China Meteorological Administrationall-time August high

== Transport ==
- China National Highway 309
- Shandong Provincial Highway 209
- Shandong Provincial Highway 212
- Shandong Provincial Highway 804
- Lanyan Railway
