= Weifang North railway station =

Railway station in Weifang, Shandong

Weifang North 潍坊北站
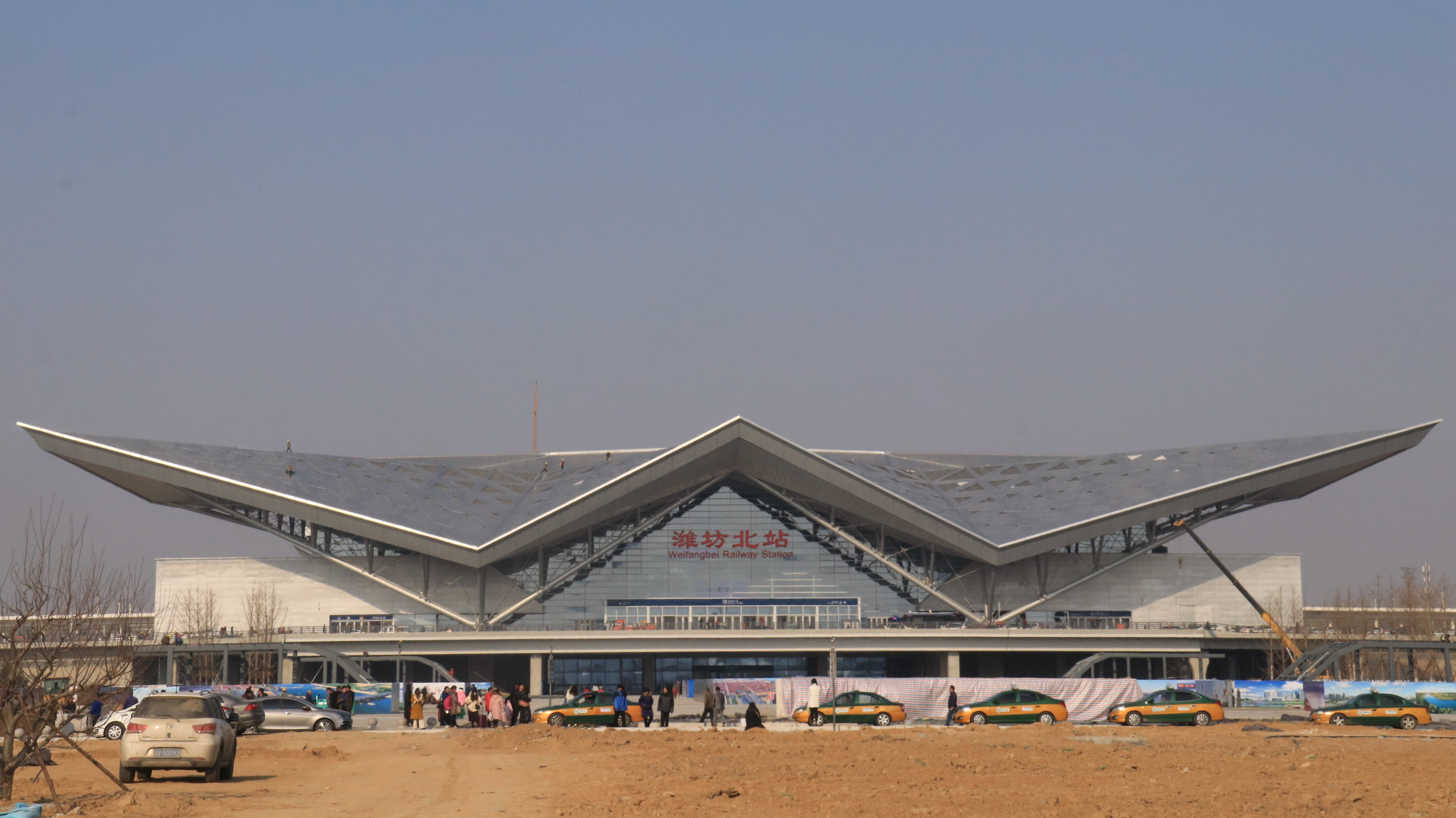
- Exterior of the station shortly after opening

General information
- Location: Hanting District, Weifang, Shandong; China
- Lines: Jinan–Qingdao high-speed railway Weifang–Laixi high-speed railway Tianjin–Weifang–Yantai high-speed railway Weifang–Suqian high-speed railway (planned)

History
- Opened: 26 December 2018
Location

Weifang North railway station (Chinese: 潍坊北站; pinyin: Wéifāngběi zhàn) is a railway station in Hanting District, Weifang, Shandong, China. It is an important node of the national "four vertical and four horizontal" high-speed railway network and an important external transportation hub for Weifang City in the future. Weifang North Station will be connected by the Jinan–Qingdao high-speed railway, Tianjin–Weifang–Yantai high-speed railway, and Weifang–Laixi high-speed railway. The Weifang urban rail transit lines 1 and R1 will form transfers here and connect to the railway system, jointly building a comprehensive transportation hub in the northern region of Weifang, achieving seamless transfer between railways and subways, and integrating municipal facilities.

The station is on the northern edge of the urban area. The more central Weifang railway station is on the Qingdao–Jinan railway and the Qingdao–Jinan passenger railway.

The station will become an interchange with the opening of the in 2020. The planned Second Beijing–Shanghai high-speed railway is also expected to pass through this station.

== History ==
The station opened on 26 December 2018 along with the Jinan–Qingdao high-speed railway.

Preceding station	China Railway High-speed	Following station
Qingzhoushi North towards Jinan East	Jinan–Qingdao high-speed railway	Gaomi North towards Qingdao North
Terminus	Weifang–Laixi high-speed railway	Changyi towards Laixi
