= Rongcheng railway station =

Railway station in Weihai, Shandong

Rongcheng 荣成
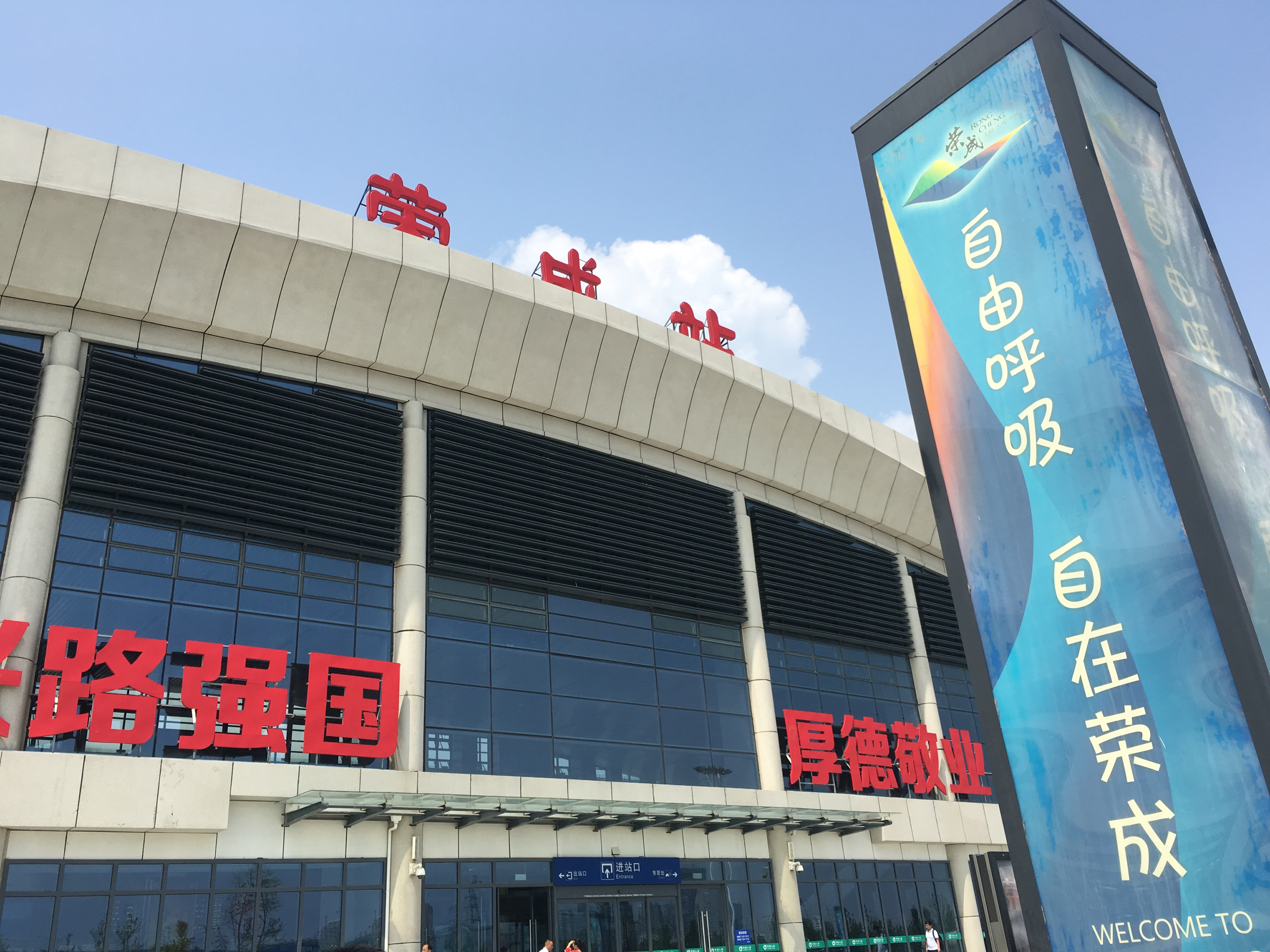
- Exterior of the station

General information
- Location: Rongcheng, Weihai, Shandong; China
- Coordinates: 37°8′36.87″N 122°24′7.22″E
- Lines: Qingdao–Rongcheng intercity railway Laixi–Rongcheng high-speed railway
- Platforms: 5

History
- Opened: December 28, 2014
Location

Rongcheng railway station (Chinese: 荣成站; pinyin: Róngchéng zhàn) is a railway station in Rongcheng, Weihai, Shandong, China. It opened on 28 December 2014 and is the eastern terminus of the Qingdao–Rongcheng intercity railway and the eastern terminus of the Laixi–Rongcheng high-speed railway.

Preceding station	China Railway High-speed	Following station
Wendeng East towards Qingdao North	Qingdao–Rongcheng intercity railway	Terminus
