= Qingdao–Rongcheng intercity railway =

Railway line in Shandong, China

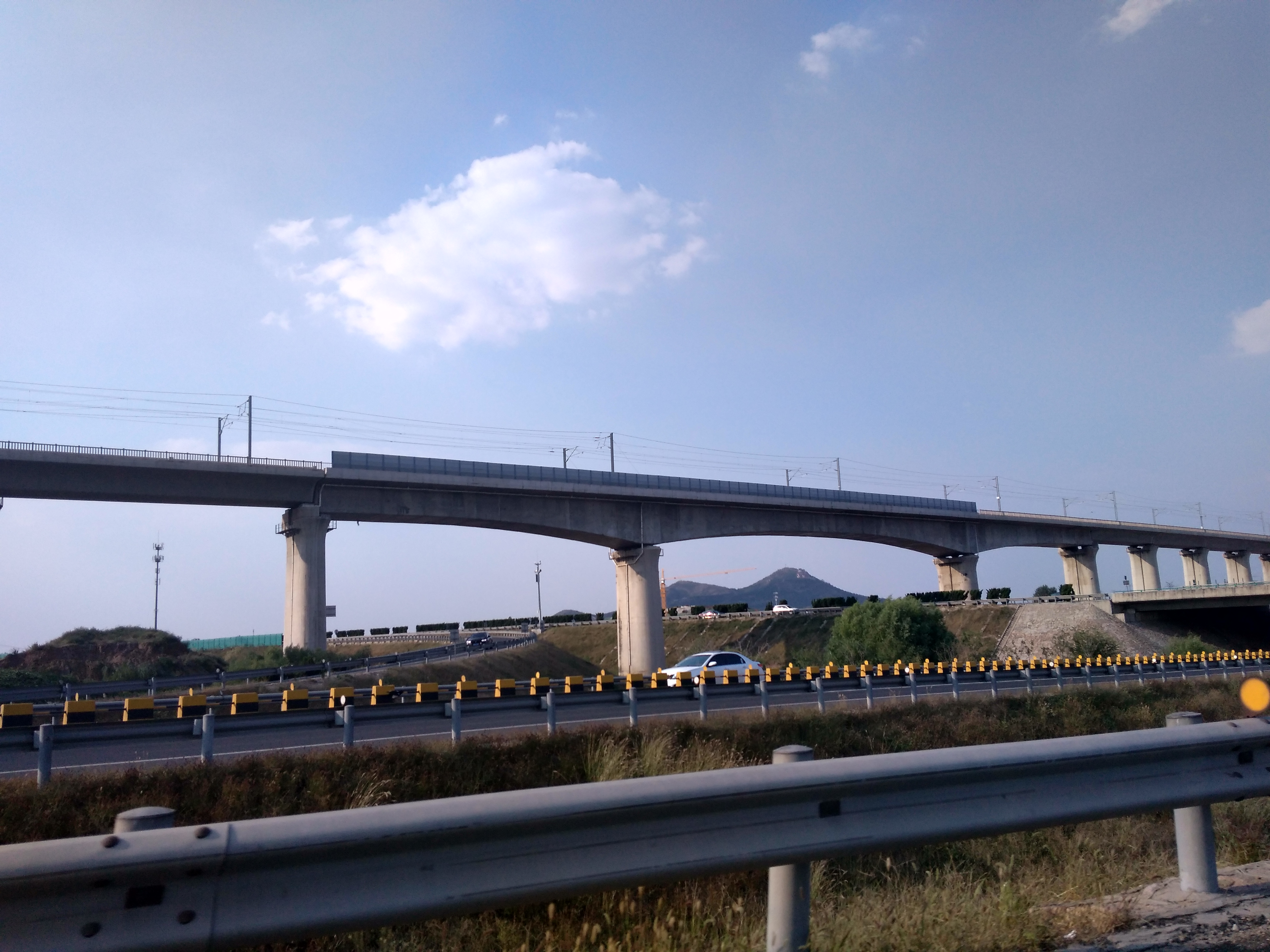
- Qingdao–Rongcheng intercity railway in Jimo

Overview
- Native name: 青荣城际铁路
- Status: Operational
- Owner: CR Jinan
- Locale: Shandong province
- Termini: Qingdao North; Rongcheng
- Stations: 14

Service
- Type: High-speed rail
- System: China Railway High-speed
- Operator: CR Jinan

History
- Opened: Jimo–Rongcheng: December 29, 2014; Qingdao-Jimo: November 16, 2016

Technical
- Line length: 298.842 km (186 mi)
- Number of tracks: 2 (Double-track)
- Track gauge: 1,435 mm (4 ft 8 1/2 in) standard gauge
- Electrification: 25 kV 50 Hz AC (Overhead line)
- Operating speed: 250 km/h (155 mph)

Qingdao–Rongcheng intercity railway is a high-speed railway located in China's, Shandong Province. It travels along the Shandong Peninsula connecting to Qingdao and Rongcheng. Line length is 298.842 km (186 mi) (containing a total length of sidings, spurs and depots etc. of 335 km (208 mi)). The design speed is based on 250 km/h (155 mph) service. However, it has been reserved for the line to be upgraded, if warranted, to 300 km/h (186 mph). Construction consisted of a three-month preparation period, a building period of 27 months and with a joint testing and commissioning period of six months. On December 28, 2014, the Qingdao–Rongcheng intercity railway opened from Jimo to Rongcheng. The whole line opened on November 16, 2016.

== History ==
- 2008 – The Ministry of Railways and the Shandong provincial government agreed to the project in accordance with 50% of the total capital investment arrangements, the Ministry of Railways, the capital of Shandong Province by 7: 3 ratio of investment, land acquisition and relocation expenses by the Shandong Provincial responsible for funding included in Shandong Province. The total project costs were estimated at 33.39 billion yuan, which included EMU rollingstock acquisition costs of 3.3 billion yuan, outside the capital costs requiring domestic bank loans. Final investment was for 37.13 billion yuan.
- February 2009 – The feasibility study and design units began reconnaissance work
- June 2009 – Feasibility report comes under assessment
- October 2009 – Began detailed geological survey
- November 2, 2009 – the National Development and Reform Commission issued "Basis Development and Reform [2009] No. 2774" approving the project for further study
- November 18, 2009 – Shandong Province issued by the Office of Housing and Urban-Rural Development, "Qingdao to Rongcheng intercity railway construction project site submission"
- December 3, 2009 – Ministry of Land and the "pre-MLR word [2009] No. 445" on the new Qingdao to Rongcheng intercity rail projects pre-construction land opinions reply "" By pre-land
- December 14, 2009 – the Ministry of Environmental Protection issued a "ring trial [2009] No. 529 "on the new railway from Qingdao to Rongcheng intercity railway environmental impact report approved". "
- March 5, 2010, the National Development and Reform Commission issued "Basis Development and Reform [2010] No. 377," the National Development and Reform Commission on New Qingdao to Rongcheng intercity rail transit project feasibility study report approved ""
- March 17, 2010 – The Ministry of Railways and the Shandong provincial government held a mobilization meeting under construction in Qingdao North Station site, officially announced the start;
- June 30, 2010 – The Ministry of Railways and the Shandong provincial government issued the "iron Kam Han [2010] No. 823" on the new Qingdao to Rongcheng intercity rail project preliminary design approval
- September 27, 2010 – The project open for tender bidding
- October 21, 2010 – Qingdao–Rongcheng Intercity Railway LLC was founded at a conference and the first general meeting for shareholders held in Jinan.
- August 25, 2014 – Qingdao to Rongcheng track laying is completed
- October 2014 – Trial operations commence
- December 26, 2014 – Began selling tickets
- December 28, 2014 – Opening of the line from Jimo to Rongcheng, with revenue services commencing.
- November 16, 2016 – Opening of the line from Qingdao to Jimo, with revenue services commencing.

== Route ==
Starting from Qingdao, the railway runs northeast, via Jimo, Laixi, Laiyang, Haiyang, Qixia, Yantai, Weihai, Wendeng to Rongcheng. The line features a short branch line to the older Yantai railway station and the port area (allowing connections to the ferries across to destinations such as Dalian). Through high-speed trains travel via the new Yantai South railway station to Rongcheng. The length of the railway is 298.842 km (186 mi) (including the branch line length of 13.3 km (8 mi)).

The line runs approximately parallel to the Lancun–Yantai railway between Laixi and Yantai South, but the remaining portion to Weihai and Rongcheng is a new route.

== Operations ==
Service started running on December 28, 2014 on the section from Jimo to Rongcheng. This included services beyond this railway project to destinations, such as Jinan, Shanghai Hongqiao and Beijing South.

- Jinan to Yantai service with a minimum time of 3 hours 17 minutes, second class seat fare is 161.5 yuan
- Jinan to Weihai service takes 3 hours 49 minutes, second class seat fare is 180 yuan
- Jinan to Rongcheng service takes 4 hours 21 minutes, second class seat ticket price of 196.5 yuan.

== Outlook ==
By 2020, daily passenger volume is expected to reach 199,000 people, while in 2030 it should reach 293,000 people. Services from Qingdao to Yantai or Weihai, the time required for the current service being 3.7 hours and 4.3 hours respectively, will be shortened to 1 hour and 1.5 hours.
