= Tianjin–Weifang high-speed railway =

High-speed rail line in China

Tianjin–Weifang high-speed railway 津潍高速铁路

Overview
- Status: Under construction
- Termini: Binhai; Weifang North
- Stations: 10

Service
- Operator(s): CR Beijing Group & CR Jinan Group
- Ridership: 2027

Technical
- Line length: 348.5 km (217 mi)
- Number of tracks: 2
- Track gauge: 1,435 mm (4 ft 8 1/2 in)
- Minimum radius: 7,000 metres (23,000 ft); 5,500 metres (18,000 ft) in difficult sections
- Electrification: 25 kV AC overhead
- Operating speed: 350 km/h (217 mph)
- Maximum incline: generally 2.0%

Tianjin–Weifang high-speed railway is a high-speed railway in China. The railway is designed to reach a maximum speed of 350 kilometres per hour (220 mph). It is expected to open in 2027.

== History ==
The feasibility study for the section from Binhai railway station in Tianjin to Weifang was approved in January 2022. Construction started on 6 November 2022.

== Stations ==
Station Name	Chinese	Metro transfers/connections	China Railway transfers/connections
Binhai	滨海		Beijing–Tianjin intercity railway
Binhai East	滨海东		
Binhai South	滨海南		
Huanghua North	黄骅北		
Haixing West	海兴西		
Wudi	无棣		
Binzhou	滨州		
Dongying South	东营南		
Shouguang East	寿光东		
Weifang North	潍坊北		Jinan–Qingdao high-speed railway Weifang–Laixi high-speed railway
