= Lancun–Yantai railway =

Railway line in Shandong, China

The Lancun−Yantai railway or Lanyan railway (simplified Chinese: 蓝烟铁路; traditional Chinese: 藍煙鐵路; pinyin: Lányān Tiělù) is a double-track, electrified railway in Shandong Province, China. The line runs from Yantai on the north coast of the Shandong Peninsula southwest to Lancun, near Qingdao, on the Jiaozhou–Jinan railway and has a total length of 183.71 km (114.15 mi). It was built from 1953 to 1956 and double-tracked in 2001. Electrification work, completed in 2010, raised train speed on the line from 80 km/h (50 mph) to 120 km/h (75 mph).

The Qingdao–Rongcheng intercity railway runs approximately parallel to this line for most of its route.

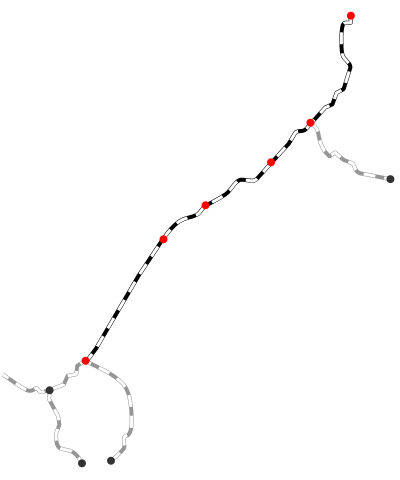
Sketch map of Lancun-Yantai Railway

== See also ==
- List of railways in China
- Rail transport in the People's Republic of China
