= Yellow River =

Major river in China

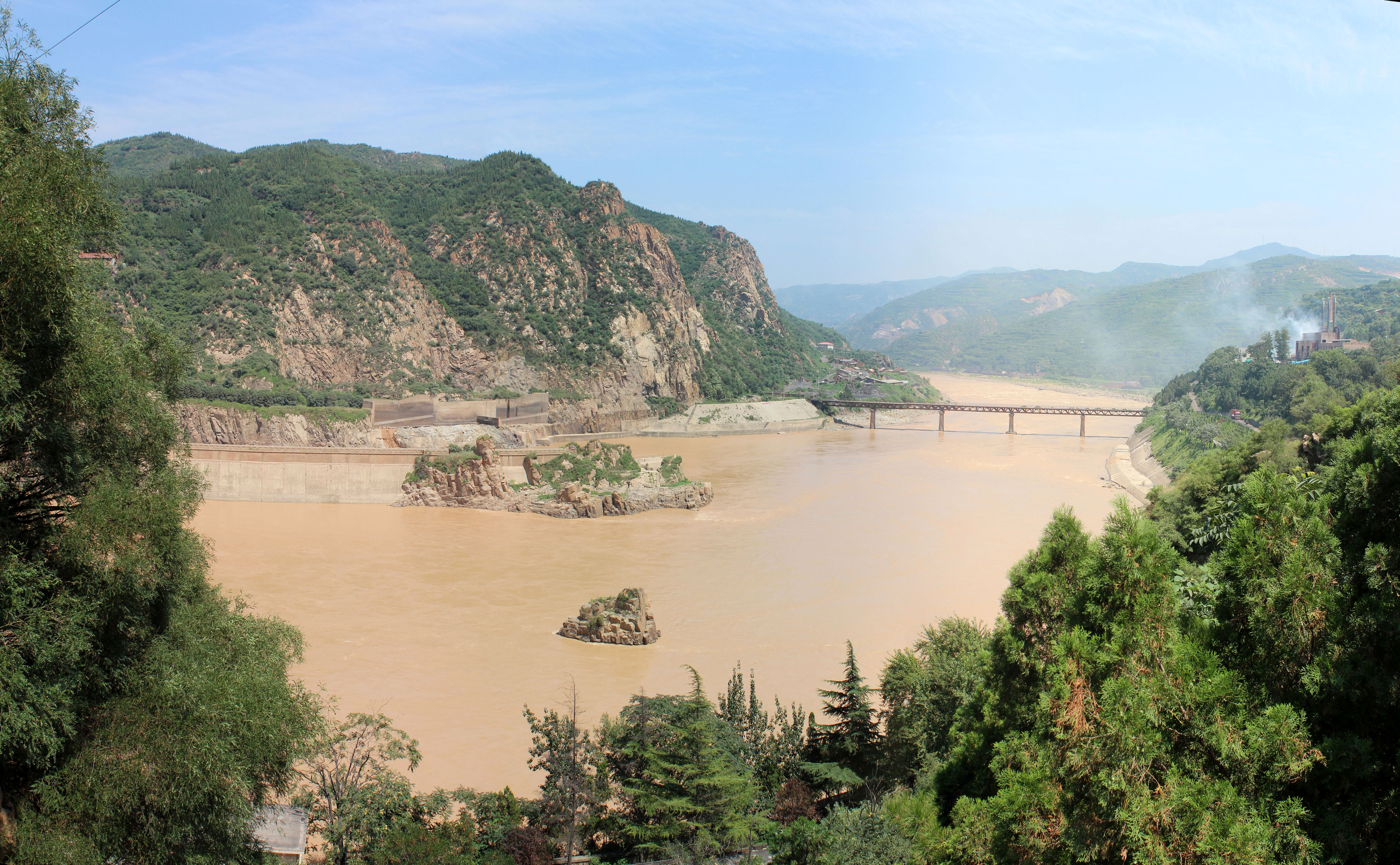
- The Yellow River in Sanmenxia, Henan

- Map of the Yellow River, whose watershed covers much of northern China
- Native name: 黄河 (Chinese); Huánghé (Chinese)

Location
- Country: China
- Province: Qinghai, Sichuan, Gansu, Ningxia, Inner Mongolia, Shaanxi, Shanxi, Henan, Shandong

Physical characteristics
- Source: Bayan Har Mountains
  - location: Yushu Prefecture, Qinghai
  - coordinates: 34°29′31″N 96°20′25″E
  - elevation: 4,800 m (15,700 ft)
- Mouth: Bohai Sea
  - location: Kenli District, Dongying, Shandong
  - coordinates: 37°45′47″N 119°09′43″E
  - elevation: 0 m (0 ft)
- Length: 5,464 km (3,395 mi)
- Basin size: 752,546 km^{2} (290,560 sq mi)
- Discharge
  - average: 2,571 m^{3}/s (90,800 cu ft/s)
  - minimum: 1,030 m^{3}/s (36,000 cu ft/s)
  - maximum: 58,000 m^{3}/s (2,000,000 cu ft/s)

Basin features
- Tributaries
  - left: Huangshui River, Fen River
  - right: Tao River, Wei River

Yellow River
- "Yellow River" in simplified (top) and traditional (bottom) Chinese characters
- Traditional Chinese: 黃河
- Simplified Chinese: 黄河
Transcriptions
Standard Mandarin
- Hanyu Pinyin: Huánghé
- Bopomofo: ㄏㄨㄤˊ ㄏㄜˊ
- Wade–Giles: Huang^{2} Ho^{2}
- IPA: [xwǎŋ xɤ̌]
other Mandarin
- Xiao'erjing: حُوَانْ‌حَ
Wu
- Romanization: Wån^{入} Ghu^{平}
Yue: Cantonese
- Yale Romanization: Wòhng Hòh
- Jyutping: Wong4 Ho4
- IPA: [wɔŋ˩ hɔ˩]
Southern Min
- Tâi-lô: N̂g Hô

The Yellow River, (Note: simplified Chinese: 黄河; traditional Chinese: 黃河; pinyin: Huánghé; Zhuyin Fuhao: ㄏㄨㄤˊ ㄏㄜˊ) also known as Huang He, is the second-longest river in China and the sixth-longest in the world, with an estimated length of 5,464 km (3,395 mi) and a drainage basin of 795,000 km^{2} (307,000 sq mi). Beginning in the Bayan Har Mountains, the river flows generally eastwards before entering the 1,500 km (930 mi) long Ordos Loop, which runs northeast at Gansu through the Ordos Plateau and turns east in Inner Mongolia. The river then turns sharply southwards to form the border between Shanxi and Shaanxi, turns eastwards at its confluence with the Wei River, and flows across the North China Plain before emptying into the Bohai Sea. The river is named for the yellow color of its water, which comes from the large amount of sediment discharged into the water as the river flows through the Loess Plateau.

The Yellow River basin was the birthplace of ancient Chinese civilization. According to traditional Chinese historiography, the Xia dynasty originated on its banks around 2100 BC; Sima Qian's Shiji (c. 91 BC) record that the Xia were founded after the tribes around the Yellow River united to combat the frequent floods in the area. The river has provided fertile soil for agriculture, but since then has flooded and changed course frequently, with one estimate counting 1,593 floods in the 2,540 years between 595 BC and 1946 AD. As such, the Yellow River has been considered a blessing and a curse throughout history, and has been nicknamed both "China's Pride" and "China's Sorrow".

The Yellow River's basin presently has a population of 120 million people, while over 420 million people live in the immediate provinces which rely on it as a water source. The basin comprises 13 percent of China's cultivated land area. The area receives uneven rainfall, only 2 percent of China's water runoff—water and sediment flow has decreased five-fold since the 1970s, and until recently, the river frequently did not reach the sea. Since 2003, China has been working on the South–North Water Transfer Project to alleviate the strain on the river's water supply.

== Etymology ==
When the Yellow River was still somewhat clear, it was simply referred to as 'the river' (河, Old Chinese: *gâi). Observations made at the Yumenkou gorge, where the river leaves the modern Loess Plateau, indicated the river changed to muddy sometime between 367 BC and 165 AD, according to chronicles' records. The alternative names 'murky river' (濁河, *drôk-gâi) and '(muddy) yellow river' (黃河, *gwâŋ-gâi) were attested in 145 BC and in 429 AD respectively. (Note: Yan Shigu (581–645) mentioned the Yellow River in his annotation "東至堂陽入黃河" in his new edition of 漢書·地理志 (Book of Han, vol. 28). This misled some scholars to believe the annotation existed in the first edition in the 1st century. Li (2004) and Hargett (2021) propose that the earliest attestation of the Yellow River is the line 封爵之誓曰：「使黃河如帶，泰山若厲。國以永寧，爰及苗裔。」in vol. 16 of Han Shu; yet Qing-era philologist Wang Niansun stated that the letter 黃 was a later interpolation and did not exist in the first edition in the 1st century. Excluding these problematic attestations in Han Shu, the two earliest attestations cited by Li (2004) came in 429 and 488. In 429, Pei Songzhi mentioned Yellow River twice in the chapter of 袁紹傳 (Yuan Shao's biography) in 三国志注 (Annotations to Records of the Three Kingdoms), "《魏氏春秋》載紹檄州郡文曰：「...騁良弓勁弩之勢，并州越太行，青州涉濟、漯，大軍汎黃河以角其前...」", and "獻帝傳曰：紹將濟河，沮授(Ju Shou)諫曰：「勝負變化，不可不詳。今宜留屯延津，分兵官渡，若其克獲，還迎不晚，設其有難，衆弗可還。」紹弗從。授臨濟歎曰：「上盈其志，下務其功，悠悠黃河，吾其反乎？」" In 488, Shen Yue mentioned Yellow River in the chapter 索虜, volume 卷九十五列傳第五十五 of 宋書 (Book of Song), "二十九年[宋元嘉二十九年, 公元452年]，太祖更遣張永、王玄謨及爽等北伐，青州刺史劉興祖建議伐河北，曰：「...愚謂宜長驅中山，據其關要。冀州已北，民人尚豐，兼麥已向熟，資因為易。向義之徒，必應響赴，若中州震動，黃河以南，自當消潰。」".) The name Yellow River fully replaced Murky River by the end of Tang dynasty, for unclear reasons. (Note: Deng (2015) proposes that the name "Yellow River" was favoured by Tang dynasty literati because there was a folk-etymological connection between 黃 ('yellow') and 廣 ('wide'), 橫 ('broad'), 鐄 ('large bell') and 潢 ('large cistern'). However, Schuessler (2007) proposes cognate between 黃 ('yellow') and Burmese ဝင်း (wang: 'bright') and ဝါ (wa 'yellow'); meanwhile he states that 廣 ('wide')'s etymology is uncertain: he relates it either to Mizo vang "to be large, extensive" and vâng 'breadth', 'width', or to Tibetan: ཡངས་པ, Wylie: yangs pa, or to Thai กว้าง kwâaŋ 'to be broad', 'wide' (← ว่าง wâaŋ 'to be free', 'at leisure', 'unoccupied'). He also cites Baxter & Sagart (1998: 60)'s opinion on a possible relation between 廣 and 寬 kuān 'wide'; and that 廣 is perhaps related to root *wa of 況 kuàng.)

In the Shaanxi loess plateau, it is referred to as 'river, my lord' (老爺河, [lo˦˩˨ i˧ xɤu̯˧]) in the Jin language. In Mongolian, it is called Šar mörön (Шар мөрөн 'yellow river') or Khatan gol (Хатан гол 'queen river'). The river is mentioned in the Kul Tigin stele as the 'green river' (Old Turkic: yašïl ügüz, 𐰖𐱁𐰞𐰽𐰺𐰍). The Tibetan name is "River of the Peacock" (Tibetan: རྨ་ཆུ, Wylie: rma.chu, THL: Ma chu; 玛曲; 瑪曲; Mǎ qǔ).

== History ==
=== Dynamics ===
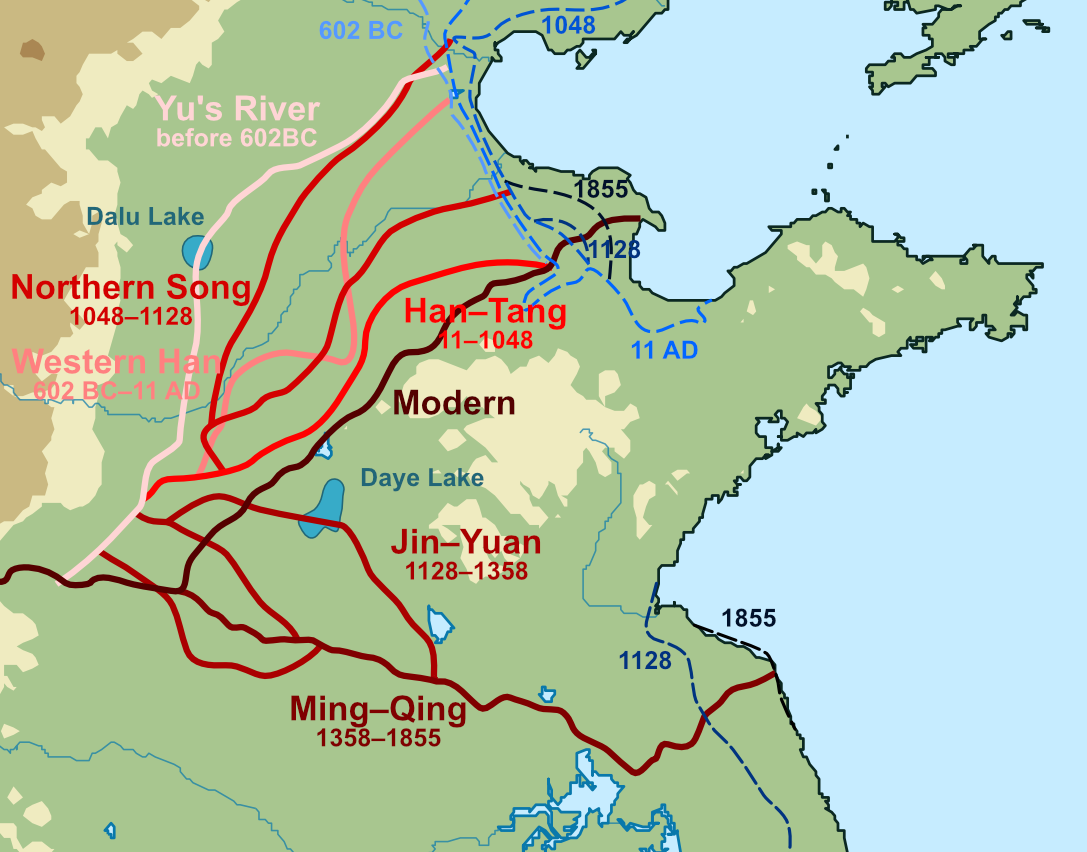
Historical courses of the Yellow River

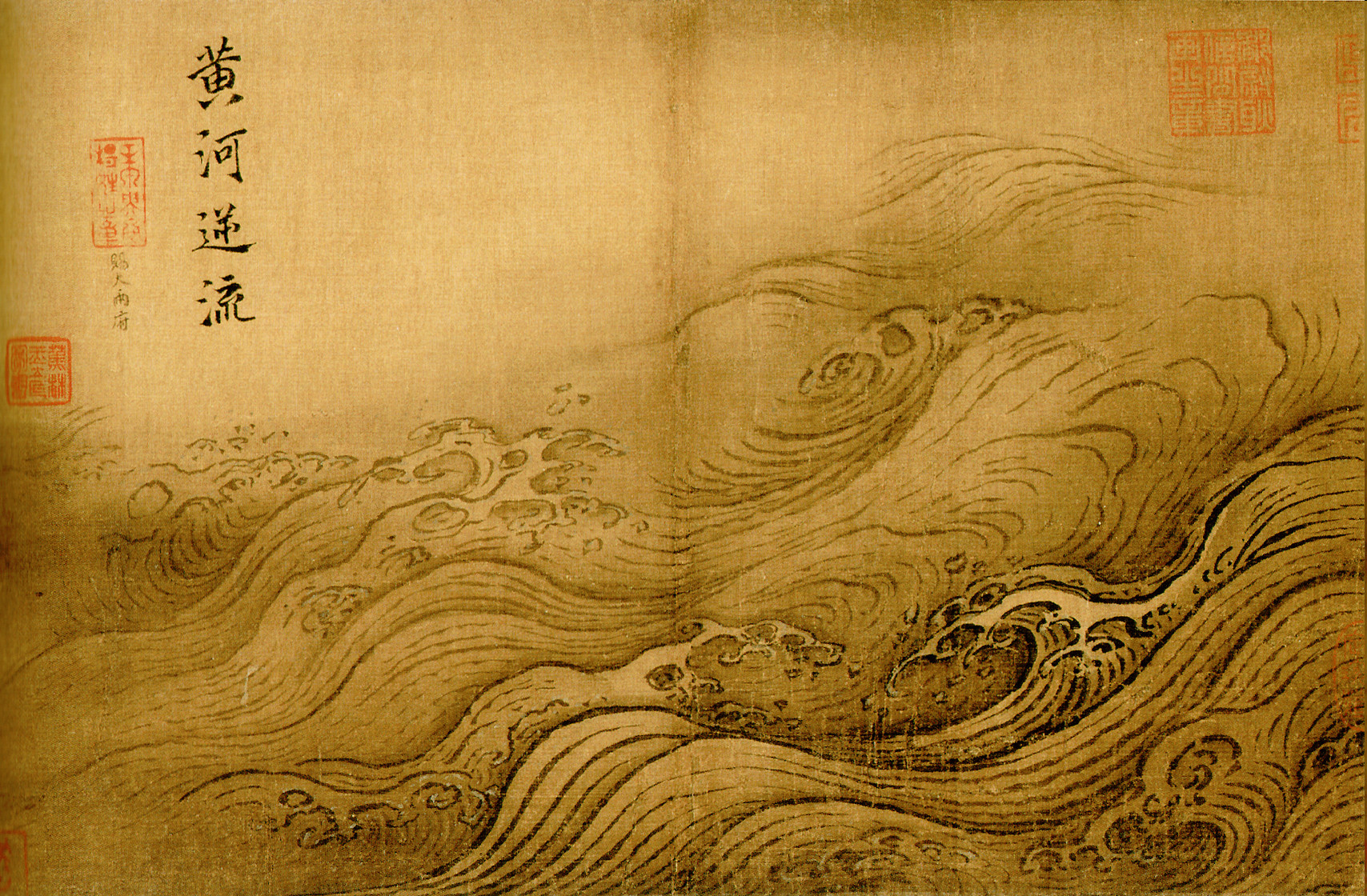
The Yellow River Breaches its Course by Ma Yuan (1160–1225, Song dynasty). Flooding of the river has been the cause of millions of deaths

The river has long been critical to the development of northern China, and is regarded by scholars as a cradle of civilization. Flooding of the river has also caused much destruction, including multiple floods that have resulted in the deaths of over one million people. Among the deadliest were the 1344 Yellow River Flood, during the Yuan dynasty, the 1887 flood during the Qing dynasty which killed anywhere from 900,000 to 2 million people, and a Republic of China era 1931 flood (part of a massive number of floods that year that killed 1–4 million people).

The cause of the floods is the large amount of fine-grained loess carried by the river from the Loess Plateau, which is continuously deposited along the bottom of its channel. The sedimentation causes natural dams to slowly accumulate. These subaqueous dams are unpredictable and generally undetectable. Eventually, the enormous amount of water needs to find a new way to the sea, forcing it to take the path of least resistance. When this happens, it bursts out across the flat North China Plain, sometimes taking a new channel and inundating most farmland, cities or towns in its path.

The traditional Chinese response of building higher and higher levees along the banks sometimes also contributed to the severity of the floods: When flood water did break through the levees, it could no longer drain back into the river bed as it would after a normal flood, as the river bed was sometimes now higher than the surrounding countryside. These changes could cause the river's mouth to shift as much as 480 km (300 mi), sometimes reaching the ocean to the north of the Shandong Peninsula and sometimes to the south.

Another historical source of devastating floods is the collapse of upstream ice dams in Inner Mongolia with an accompanying sudden release of vast quantities of impounded water. There have been 11 such major floods in the past century, each causing tremendous loss of life and property. Nowadays, explosives dropped from aircraft are used to break the ice dams before they become dangerous.

Before modern dams appeared in China, the Yellow River used to be extremely prone to flooding. In the 2,540 years from 595 BC to 1946 AD, the Yellow River has been reckoned to have flooded 1,593 times, shifting its course 26 times noticeably and nine times severely. These floods include some of the deadliest natural disasters ever recorded. Before modern disaster management, when floods occurred, some of the population might initially die from drowning and many more would suffer later from the ensuing famine and spread of diseases.

=== Cradle of civilization ===
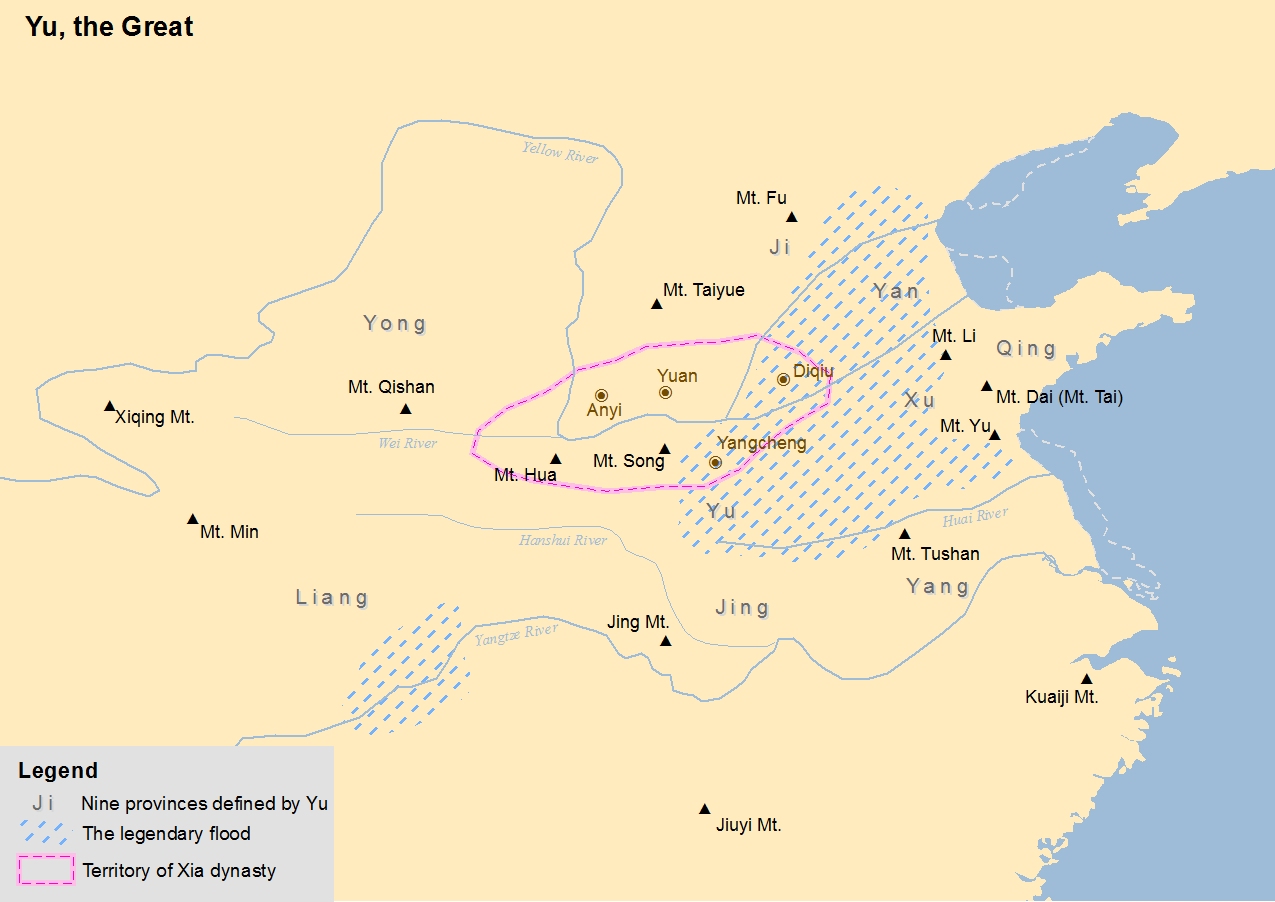
Territory of the Great Yu and the flooded area

Chinese states during the Western Zhou era, most of which are located in the middle and lower reaches of the Yellow River

In Chinese mythology, the giant Kua Fu drained the Yellow River and the Wei River to quench his burning thirst as he pursued the Sun. Historical documents from the Spring and Autumn period and Qin dynasty indicate that the Yellow River at that time flowed considerably north of its present course. These accounts show that after the river passed Luoyang, it flowed along the border between Shanxi and Henan Provinces, then continued along the border between Hebei and Shandong before emptying into Bohai Bay near present-day Tianjin. Another outlet followed essentially the present course.

During the era of the Three Sovereigns and Five Emperors (around the early 21st century BC), the Yellow River flooded repeatedly, and Yu the Great was ordered to control the waters. The Yu Gong records: "Guiding the River from Jishi, it reached Longmen; southward to Huayin; eastward to Dizhu; then further east to Mengjin; passing east of Luorui, it reached Dapei; crossing north of Jiang River, it reached the Great Plain; then spreading northward into nine channels, they merged into the Inverse River and entered the sea." The "Jishi" mentioned here refers to the Amne Machin Mountains near present-day Xunhua Salar Autonomous County in Qinghai Province. This passage describes how, below Longmen, the Yellow River flowed southward to Huayin, then turned east, passing through Sanmen and Mengjin where it joined the Luo River. Continuing downstream, it passed north of Dapei Mountain, crossed through the Zhang River, and flowed northward east of present-day Quzhou County in Hebei, before splitting into several branches that each emptied into the sea. The northernmost branch served as the main channel, turning south at present-day Shen County before heading east, following the Zhang River to the southwest of Qing County, and then flowing northeast through the southeast of Tianjin into the Bohai Sea. Because this course is recorded in the Yu Gong, it is known as the "Yu River."

=== Shift of the Yu River ===
In the fifth year of the reign of King Ding of Zhou (602 BC), the river left these paths and shifted several hundred kilometers to the east. The Yellow River burst its banks and changed course at Suxu Mouth in Liyang (southwest of present-day Xun County, Henan), deviating from the original course of the Yu River. It then flowed into the sea at Zhangwu (northeast of present-day Cang County, Hebei), marking the first major course change of the Yellow River recorded in history since Yu the Great tamed the floods. After the diversion at Suxu Mouth, the new channel ran roughly eastward from near Hua County, then northwest of Puyang in Henan, before turning northward; it bent east again north of Guan County in Shandong, then north again through Chiping, gradually shifting northward through Cangzhou in Hebei, and finally entering the Bohai Sea north of present-day Huanghua County in Hebei. Meanwhile, the original Yu River channel continued to carry water intermittently until it dried up completely in the middle of the Warring States period. Sabotage of dikes, canals, and reservoirs and deliberate flooding of rival states became a standard military tactic during the Warring States period. As the Yellow River valley was the major entryway to the Guanzhong area and the state of Qin from the North China Plain, Qin heavily fortified the Hangu Pass; it saw multiple battles and was also an important chokepoint protecting the Han capitals of Chang'an and Luoyang. Major flooding in AD 11 is credited with the downfall of the short-lived Xin dynasty, and another flood in AD 70 returned the river north of Shandong on essentially its present course.

=== Imperial times ===
From around the beginning of the 3rd century, the importance of the Hangu Pass was reduced, with the major fortifications and military bases moved upriver to Tongguan. In AD 923, the desperate Later Liang general Duan Ning again broke the dikes, flooding 1,000 square miles (2,600 km^{2}) in a failed attempt to protect his realm's capital from the Later Tang. A similar proposal from the Song engineer Li Chun concerning flooding the lower reaches of the river to protect the central plains from the Khitai was overruled in 1020: the Chanyuan Treaty between the two states had explicitly forbidden the Song from establishing new moats or changing river courses.

Breaches occurred regardless: one at Henglong in 1034 divided the course into three and repeatedly flooded the northern regions of Dezhou and Bozhou. The Song worked for five years futilely attempting to restore the previous course – using over 35,000 employees, 100,000 conscripts, and 220,000 tons of wood and bamboo in a single year – before abandoning the project in 1041. The more sluggish river then occasioned a breach at Shanghu that sent the main outlet north towards Tianjin in 1048.

=== Southern course period ===
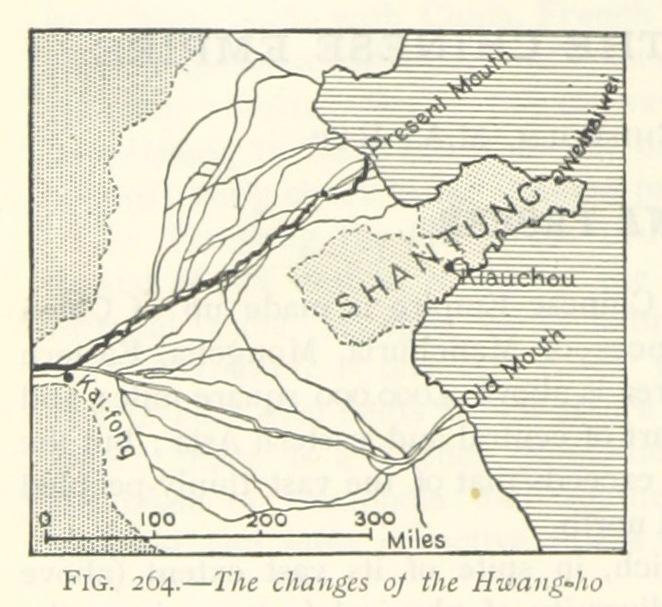
Map of old and current mouths of Yellow River

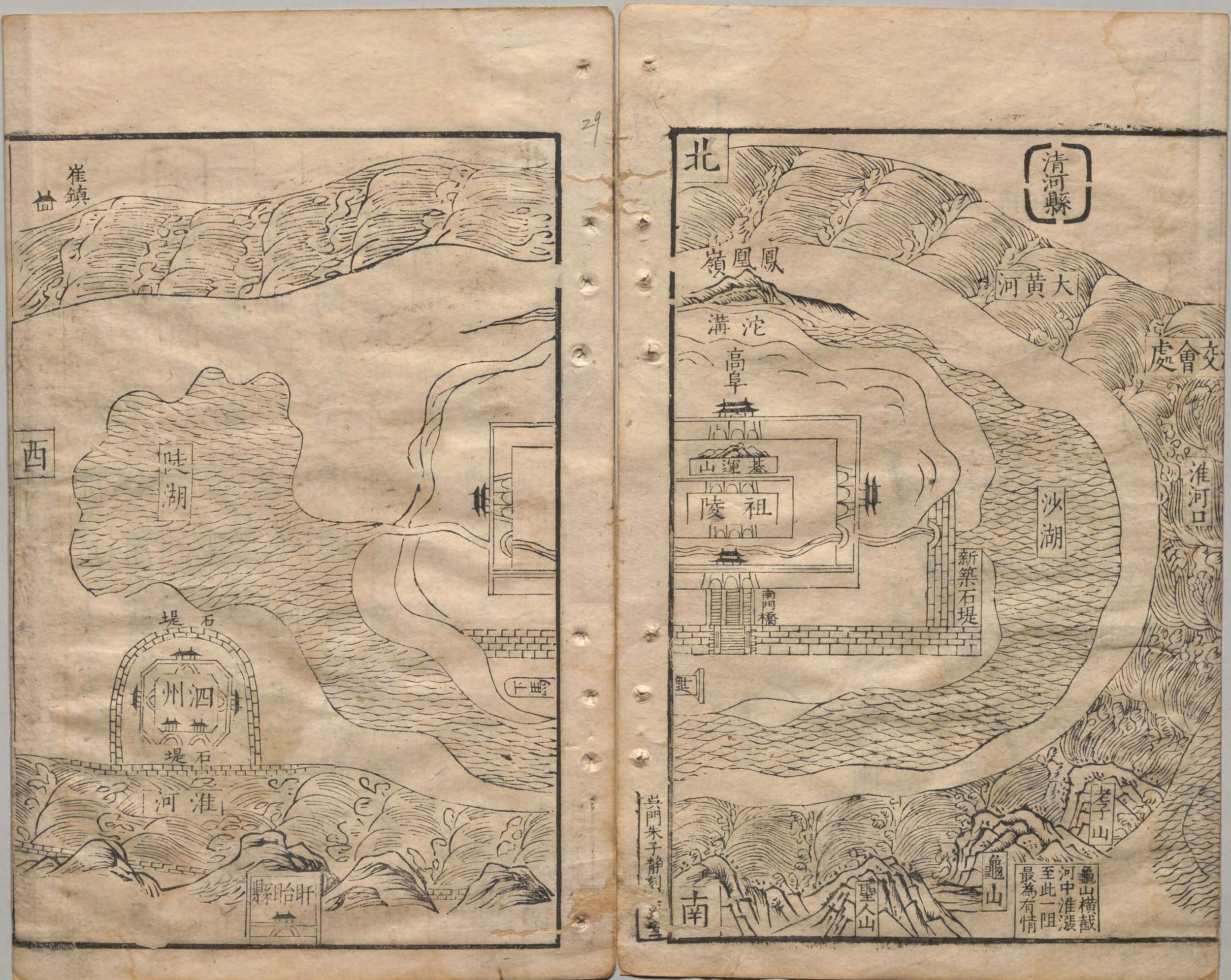
The Yellow River and Huai surrounding Sizhou and the Ming Zuling in the Complete Library of the Four Treasuries edition of Pan Jixun's Overview of River Maintenance. By the time of the Qing-era edition, both had been entirely lost during the 1680 flood

From 1128 to 1855, the Yellow River did not flow in today's course towards Bohai Sea, instead, it flowed southward, merging with the Huai River and emptying into the Yellow Sea off the coast of present-day northern Jiangsu Province. In 1128, Song troops under the Kaifeng governor Du Chong (杜充, Dù Chōng, d. 1141) breached the southern dikes of the Yellow River in an effort to stop the advancing Jin army. The resulting major river avulsion allowed the Yellow to capture the Si and other tributaries of the Huai River. For the first time in recorded history, the Yellow River shifted completely south of Shandong Peninsula and flowed into the Yellow Sea. By 1194, the mouth of the Huai had been blocked. The buildup of silt deposits was such that even after the Yellow River later shifted its course, the Huai could no longer flow along its historic course, but instead, its water pools into Hongze Lake and then runs southward toward the Yangtze River.

A flood in 1344 returned the Yellow River south of Shandong. The Yuan dynasty was waning, and the emperor forced enormous teams to build new embankments for the river. The terrible conditions helped to fuel rebellions that led to the founding of the Ming dynasty. The course changed again in 1391 when the river flooded from Kaifeng to Fengyang in Anhui. It was finally stabilized by the eunuch Li Xing during the public works projects following the 1494 flood. The river flooded multiple times in the 16th century, including in 1526, 1534, 1558, and 1587. Each flood affected the river's lower course.

The 1642 flood was man-made, caused by the attempt of the Ming governor of Kaifeng to use the river to destroy the peasant rebels under Li Zicheng who had been besieging the city for the past six months. He directed his men to break the dikes in an attempt to flood the rebels, but destroyed his own city instead: the flood and the ensuing famine and plague are estimated to have killed 300,000 of the city's previous population of 378,000. The once-prosperous city was nearly abandoned until its rebuilding under the Kangxi Emperor in the Qing dynasty.

The question of how aggressively flooding should be controlled, and whether it should be steered back to its original channels when it migrated, was a topic of controversy in the imperial court. Rival cliques made arguments based on budgetary, technical and strategic criteria. Geographer Charles Greer identifies two competing schools of thought on how to control the Yellow River. One, which he identifies as Confucian, advocated containing the river between higher levees, thus maximizing the amount of river basin land that could be cultivated. The other, which he associates with Taoism, favored lower levees separated by as much as 5–10 kilometers. In one particular long-running debate during the 11th century reigns of the Renzong and Shenzong emperors, when the river repeatedly broke its levees and migrated north and west, officials battled over whether expensive measures should be taken to return the river to its former channels. The Shenzong emperor ultimately decreed that the river be allowed to remain in its new course.

Traditional flood control techniques made use of levees, revetments to absorb the energy of the water, overflow basins, drainage canals and polders. Treatises on traditional flood control techniques were written by officials such as Pan Jixun, who argued that joining branches of the river increased the water's power and this in turn increased its ability to flush sediment. The difficult situation around the confluence of the Yellow River, the Huai, and the Grand Canal, however, still led to a major flood of the regional center Sizhou and Pan's dismissal from court. Subsequently, the river's 1680 flood entirely submerged Sizhou and the nearby Mausoleum to Ming Ancestors beneath Hongze Lake for centuries until modern irrigation and flood control lowered the water level enough to permit their excavation and the tombs' restoration starting from the 1970s.

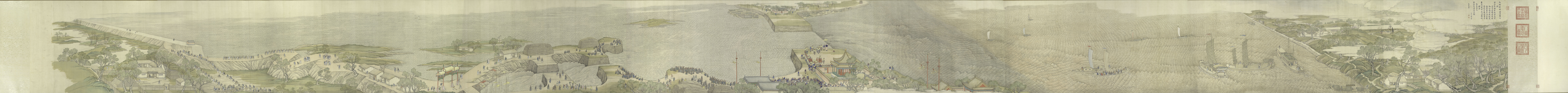
Qianlong Emperor’s Southern Inspection Tour, Scroll Four, which depicts the scene of confluence of the Huai and Yellow River

=== 19th century through present ===
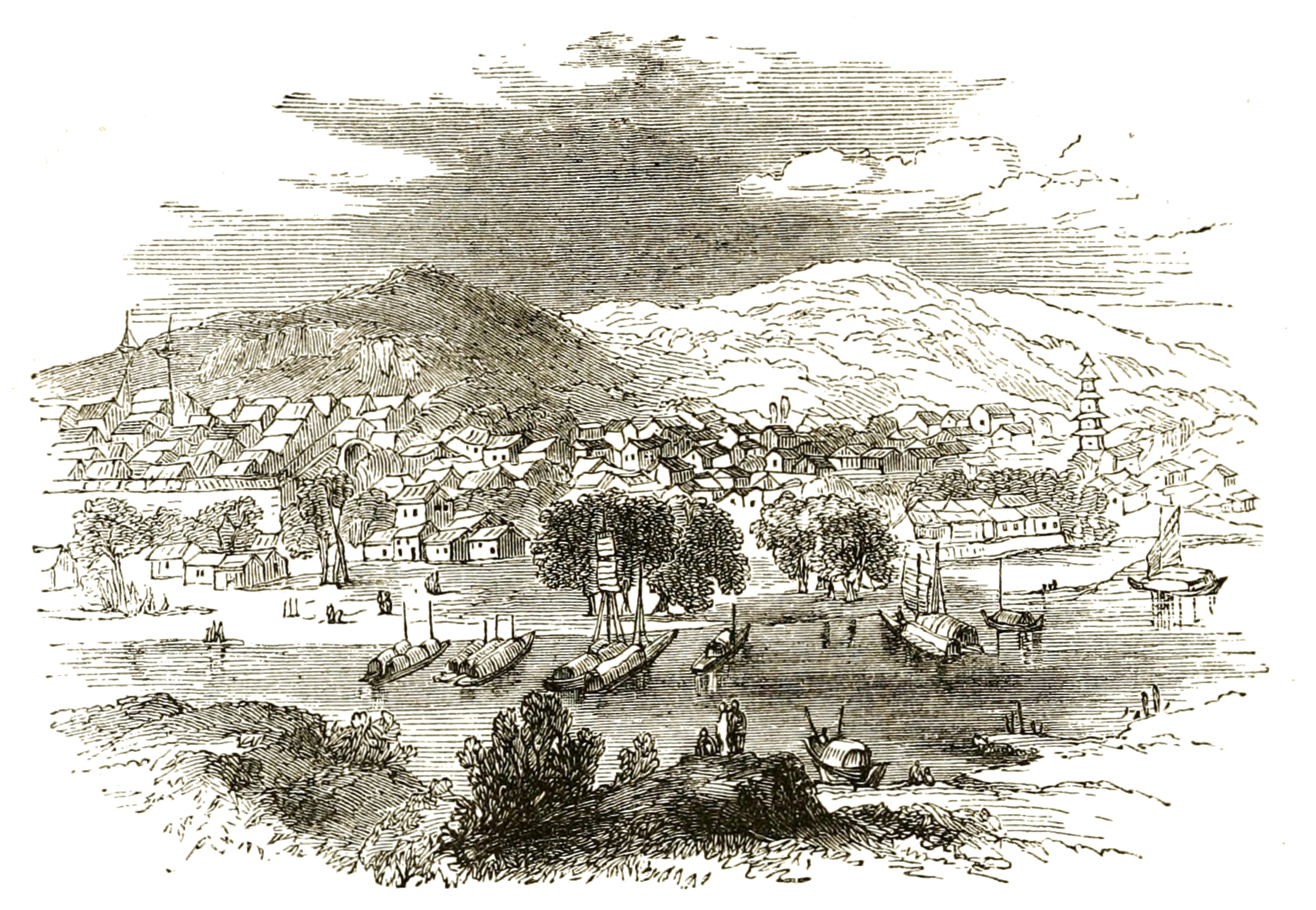
Town of Hekou (in today's Togtoh County, Neimenggu), 1851

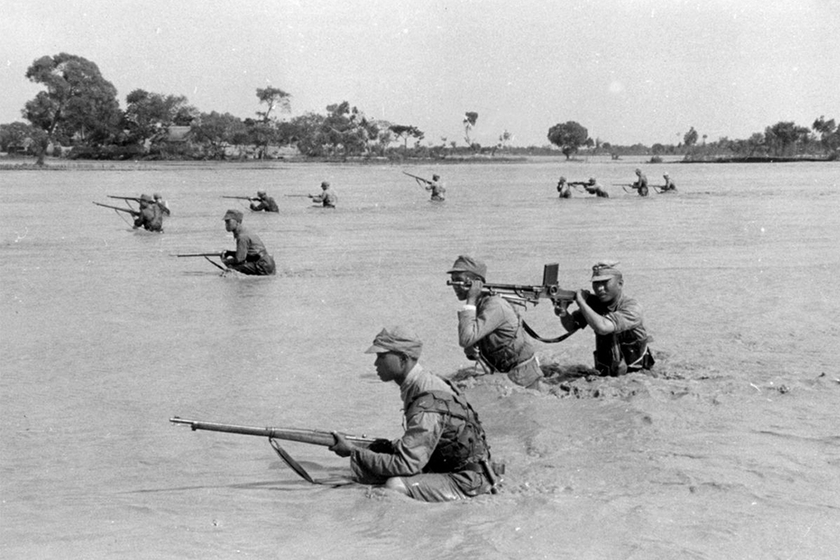
Chinese Nationalist Army soldiers during the 1938 Yellow River flood.

Between 1851 and 1855, the Yellow River returned to the north amid the floods that provoked the Nien and Taiping Rebellions. The 1887 flood has been estimated to have killed between 900,000 and 2 million people, and is the second-worst natural disaster in history (excluding famines and epidemics). The Yellow River more or less adopted its present course during the 1897 flood.

Flooding in 1898 made entire communities in Shandong destitute. Along with the drought that followed and the increase in Christian missionary activity exacerbating social divisions in rural China, the Yellow River flooding was a factor in the rise of the Society of Righteous and Harmonious Fists (Boxer movement) and the Boxer Rebellion.

The 1931 flood killed an estimated 1,000,000 to 4,000,000, and is the worst recorded flood in terms of number of fatalities.

On 9 June 1938, during the Second Sino-Japanese War, Kuomintang (Nationalist) troops under Chiang Kai-shek broke the levees holding back the river near the village of Huayuankou in Henan, causing what has been called by Canadian historian, Diana Lary, a "war-induced natural disaster". The goal of the operation was to stop the advancing Japanese troops by following a strategy of "using water as a substitute for soldiers". The 1938 flood of an area covering 54,000 km^{2} (20,800 sq mi) took some 500,000 to 900,000 Chinese lives, along with an unknown number of Japanese soldiers. The flood prevented the Japanese Army from taking Zhengzhou, on the southern bank of the Yellow River, but did not stop them from reaching their goal of capturing Wuhan, which was the temporary seat of the Chinese government and straddles the Yangtze River.

The Kuomintang government did not acknowledge responsibility for Huayuankou breach and the subsequent disaster, instead blaming Japanese warplanes for bombing the dikes. Both Japan and the international press publicized China's culpability, but China's domestic press, even Communist newspapers, maintained the government's official stance through the duration of the war.

Already in 1940, the Kuomintang government promised to return the river to its northern course when the Japanese were defeated. In late 1944, planning began for the closing of the Huayuankou breach and the restoration of the dikes along the pre-1938 course. This was opposed by people living along the northern course and by local Communist insurgents.

In 1946, the Chinese Communist Party's Central Committee, agreed with the Nationalists on the need to return to river to its former course, but only after dike repairs were made. The Nationalists, however, moved ahead with closing the Huayuankou breach, officially starting the project on 1 March. It was shortly after that the Communists first publicly blamed the nationalists for the breach and its failure to stop the Japanese.

Chaiang Kai-shek had both strategic and tactical reasons to prioritize the closing of the breach related to the ongoing Chinese Civil War and the 1947 Strong Point offensive, and his Nationalists plowed ahead with their work. They finished the closing the 1,500-meter (5,000 ft) breach at Huayuankou on 15 March 1947, with the river fully reverting to its original course the following day. On the 1947 anniversary of the May Fourth Movement, the Kuomintang held a ceremony at Huayuankou to celebrate the achievement.

Agricultural cultivation resumed in the former southern course that same year, while thousands of people along the restored northern course with its unrepaired dikes were forced to flee. In areas under Communist control, mass mobilization efforts involving hundreds of thousands of souls were undertaken by local officials to repair and fortify the dikes.

Xigu, a major industrial district along the Yellow River developed during China's First-Five Year Plan

Following the Communist victory in 1949, the People's Republic of China announced in 1954 its General Plan to Fundamentally Control Yellow River Flood Disasters and Develop Yellow River Waterworks. It sought to address both flooding risks and to convert rainfall-fed fields of the North China Plain to irrigated agriculture. Construction began in earnest in 1957.

From the 1970s to the 1990s, the dry-up trends accelerated, with the Yellow River failing to reach its mouth for an average of approximately 180 days per year in the 1990s. In 1997, the Yellow River did not reach the sea for 226 consecutive days.

On 12 August 2024, according to the Yellow River Water Conservancy Committee of the Ministry of Water Resources, since the implementation of unified water flow regulation for the entire river in 1999, the Yellow River has achieved continuous flow for 25 consecutive years as of August 12. Over the past 25 years, the main stream of the Yellow River has supplied a total of more than 543.6 billion cubic meters of water, with a total of 1.464 billion cubic meters of ecological water replenishment. The number of bird species in the estuarine wetlands and protected areas has increased to 373, and the wetland ecosystem has undergone a positive restoration.

== Geography ==
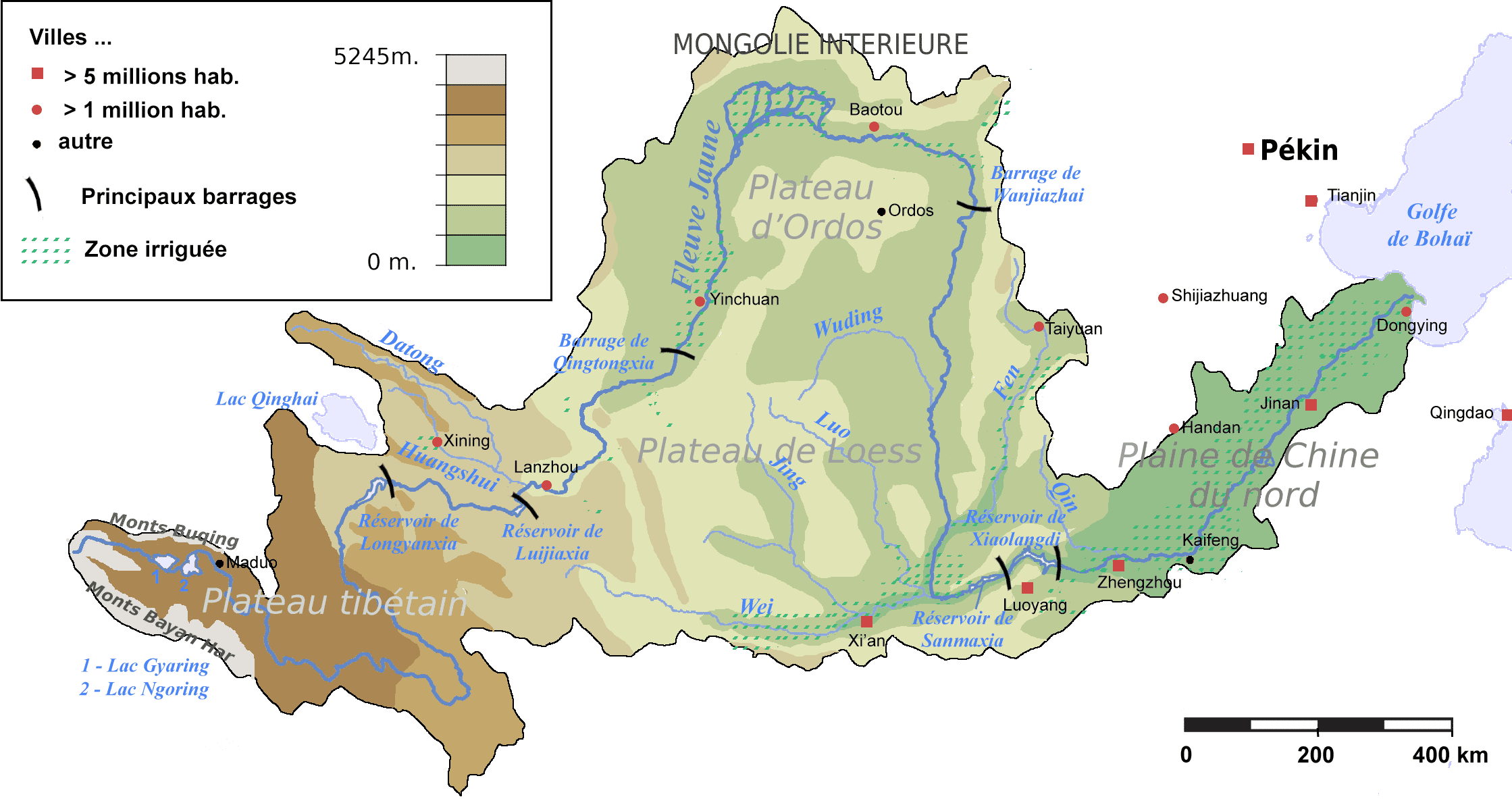
Topological map of Yellow River Basin

The Yellow River basin has an east–west extent of about 1,900 kilometers (1,180 mi) and a north–south extent of about 1,100 km (680 mi). Its total drainage area is about 795,000 square kilometers (307,000 sq mi).

According to the China Exploration and Research Society, the source of the Yellow River is at 34°29′31″N 96°20′25″E in the Bayan Har Mountains near the eastern edge of the Yushu Tibetan Autonomous Prefecture. The source tributaries drain into Gyaring Lake and Ngoring Lake on the western edge of Golog Prefecture high in the Bayan Har Mountains of Qinghai. In the Zoige Basin along the boundary with Gansu, the Yellow River loops northwest and then northeast before turning south, creating the "Ordos Loop", and then flows generally eastward across the North China Plain to the Gulf of Bohai, draining a basin of 752,443 square kilometers (290,520 sq mi) which nourishes 140 million people with drinking water and irrigation.

The Yellow River passes through seven present-day provinces and two autonomous regions, namely (from west to east) Qinghai, Sichuan, Gansu, Ningxia, Inner Mongolia, Shaanxi, Shanxi, Henan, and Shandong. Major cities along the present course of the Yellow River include (from west to east) Lanzhou, Yinchuan, Wuhai, Baotou, Luoyang, Zhengzhou, Kaifeng, and Jinan. The current mouth of the Yellow River is located at Kenli County, Shandong.

The river is commonly divided into three stages. These are roughly the northeast of the mountainous Tibetan Plateau, the Ordos Loop and Loess Plateau, and the North China Plain. However, different scholars have different opinions on how the three stages are divided. This article mainly adopts the division used by the Yellow River Conservancy Commission.

The Yellow River derived sediments have been transported out of the Bohai Sea, all way to the North Yellow Sea and South Yellow Sea, and formed a Distal Depocenter around the Shandong Peninsula.

=== Geology ===
The Yellow River first formed sometime during the Late Miocene, Pliocene or Pleistocene, as a result of the Tibetan Plateau being uplifted.

=== Upper reaches ===
The upper reaches of the Yellow River constitute a segment starting from its source in the Bayan Har Mountains and ending at Hekou Town (Togtoh County), Inner Mongolia just before it turns sharply to the south. This segment has a total length of 3,472 kilometers (2,157 mi) and total basin area of 386,000 square kilometers (149,000 sq mi), 51.4% of the total basin area. Along this length, the elevation of the Yellow River drops 3,496 meters (11,470 ft), with an average grade of 0.10%.

The source section flows mainly through pastures, swamps, and knolls between the Bayan Har Mountains, and the Anemaqen (Amne Machin) Mountains in Qinghai. The river water is clear and flows steadily. Crystal clear lakes are characteristic of this section. The two main lakes along this section are Lake Gyaring (Zhaling) and Lake Ngoring (Eling), with capacities of 4.7 billion and 10.8 billion m^{3} (166 and 381 billion ft^{3}), respectively. At elevations over 4,290 m (14,070 ft) above sea level they are the two largest plateau freshwater lakes nationwide. A significant amount of land in the Yellow River's source area has been designated as the Sanjiangyuan ("'Three Rivers' Sources") National Nature Reserve, to protect the source region of the Yellow River, the Yangtze, and the Mekong.

Flowing east at the eastern edge of the Amne Machin Mountains, the Yellow River enters Maqu County in Gansu. Here, the river skirts through the high-altitude peat bog known as the Zoigê Wetlands and makes a sharp turn towards the northwest forming the border between Maqu and Zoigê County in Sichuan. Flowing now along the northern edge of Amne Machin, the river reenters Qinghai and gradually curves north towards the Longyang Gorge at Xinghai.

The valley section stretches from Longyang Gorge in Qinghai to Qingtong Gorge in Gansu. Steep cliffs line both sides of the river. The water bed is narrow and the average drop is large, so the flow in this section is extremely turbulent and fast. There are 20 gorges in this section, the most famous of these being the Longyang, Jishi, Liujia, Bapan, and Qingtong gorges. The flow conditions in this section makes it the best location for hydroelectric plants. The Yellow River exits Qinghai for the second and final time in these gorges and enters Gansu for the second time just before Liujia Gorge. Downstream from the Yanguo Gorge, the provincial capital of Lanzhou is built upon the Yellow River's banks. The Yellow River flows northeasterly out of Gansu and into Ningxia before the Qingtong Gorge.

After emerging from the Qingtong Gorge, the river comes into a section of vast alluvial plains, the Yinchuan Plain and Hetao Plain. In this section, the regions along the river are mostly deserts and grasslands, with very few tributaries. The flow is slow. The Hetao Plain has a length of 900 km (560 mi) and width of 30 to 50 km (19 to 31 mi). It is historically the most important irrigation plain along the Yellow River.

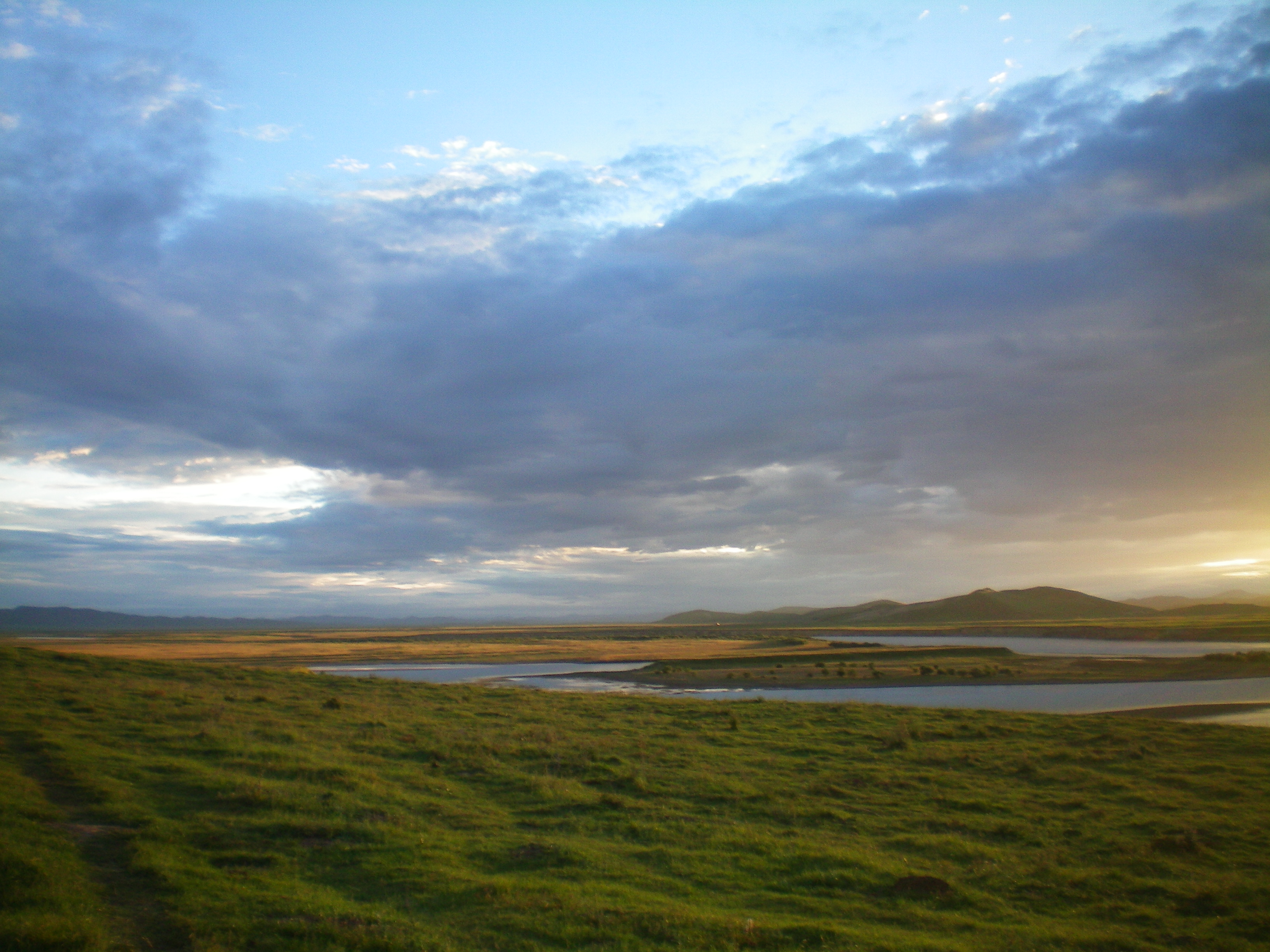
Zoigê County, Sichuan.

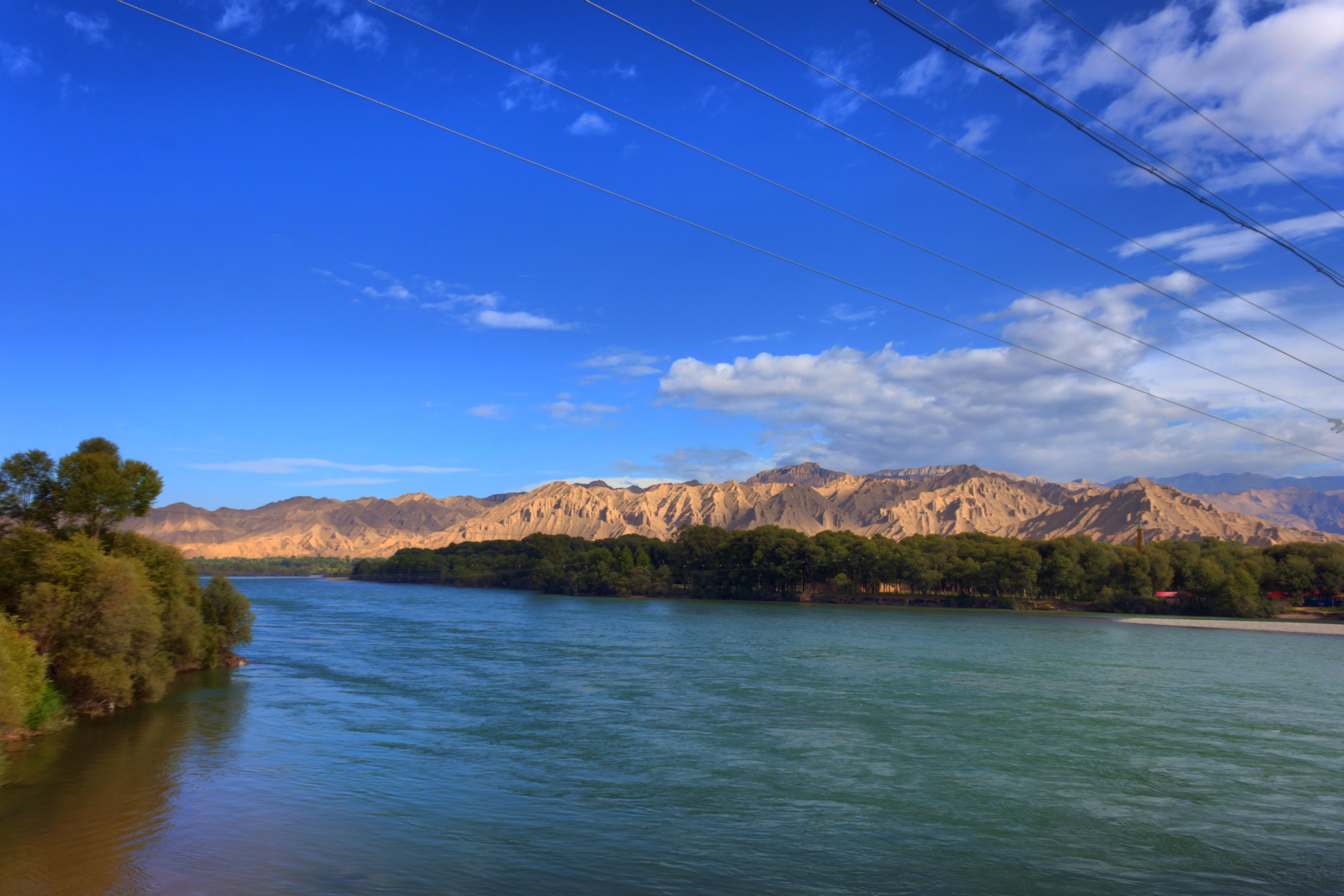
Guide County, Qinghai in the Tibetan Plateau, upstream from the Loess Plateau.

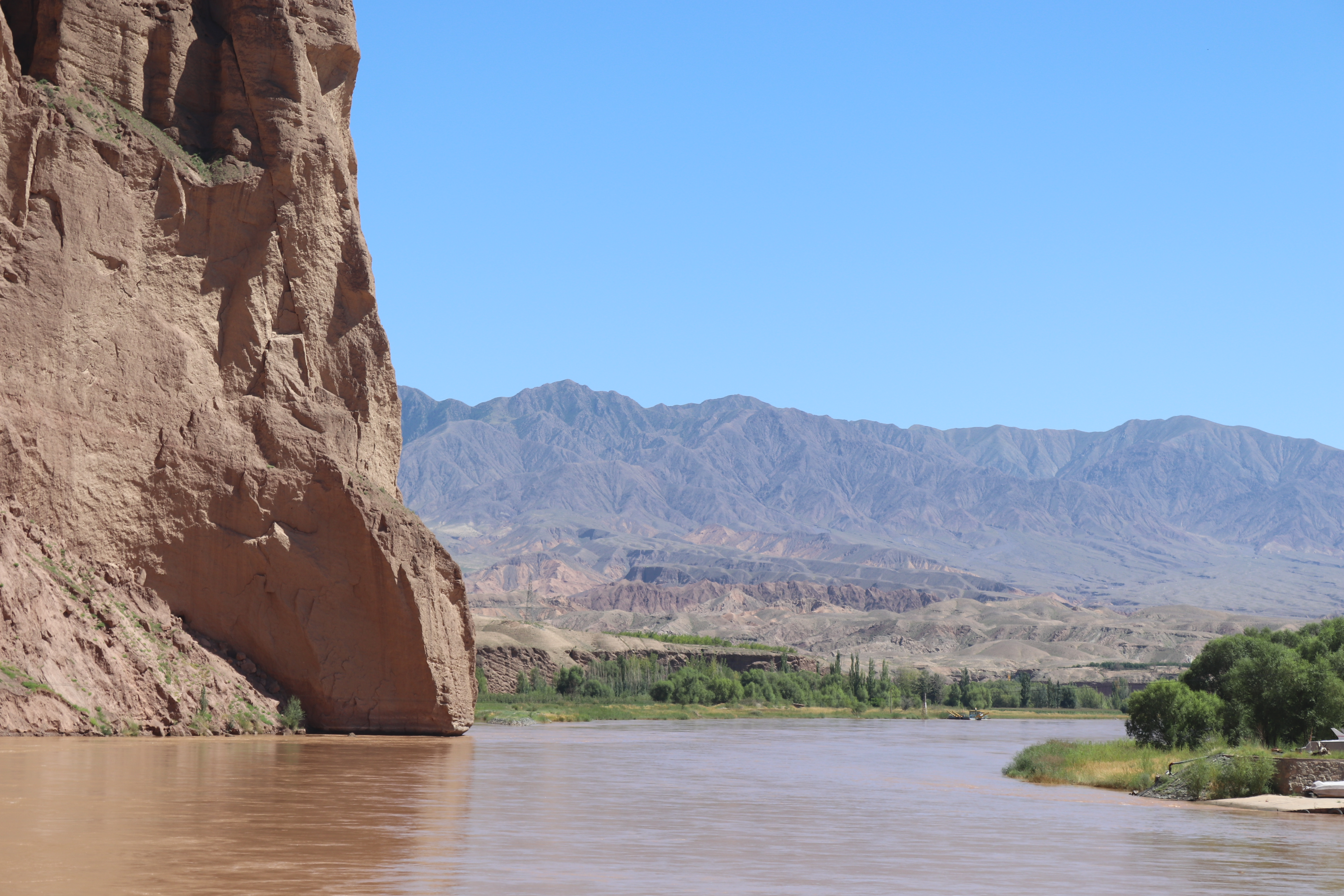
At Jingtai, Gansu

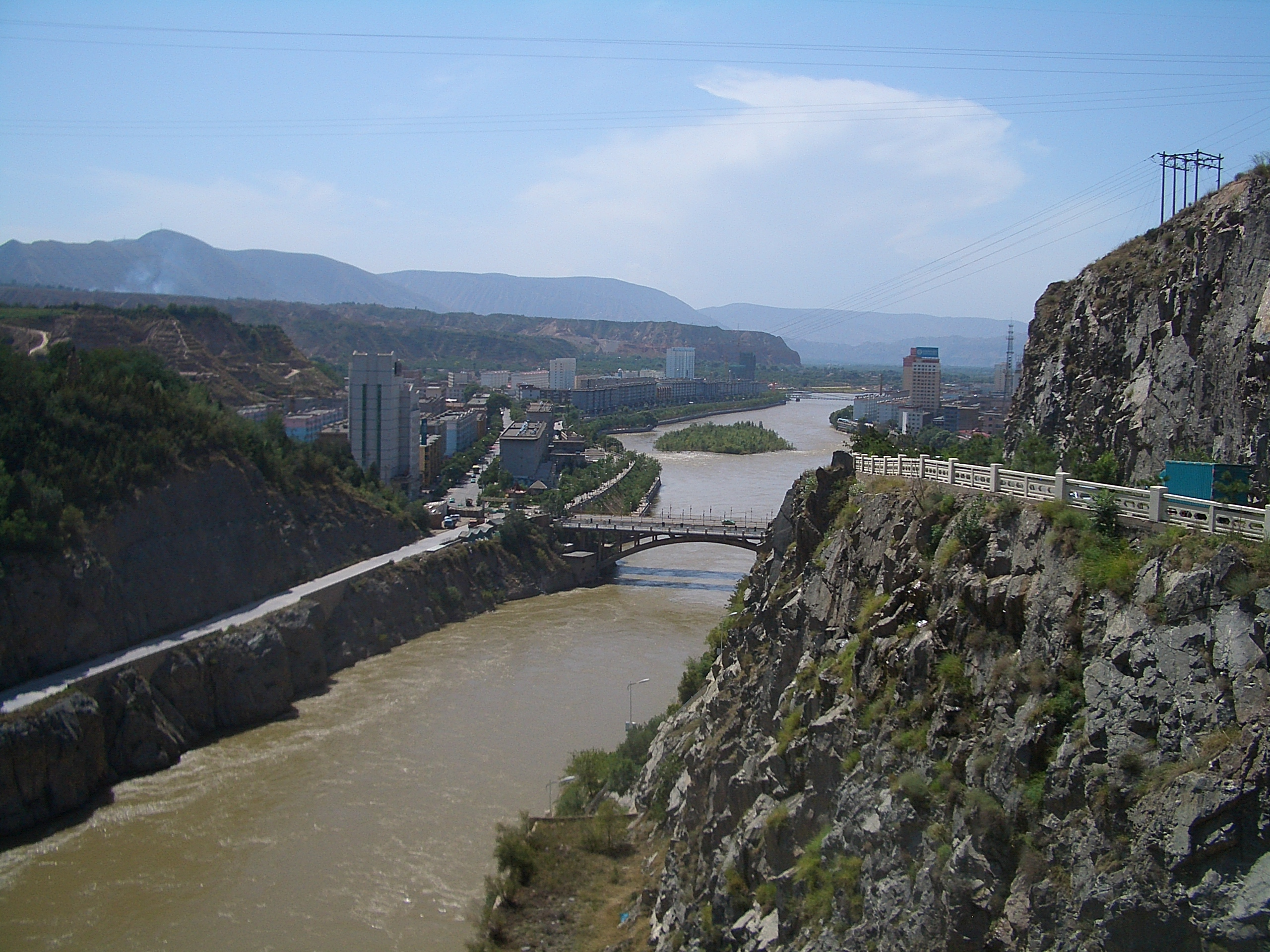
Liujiaxia, Gansu

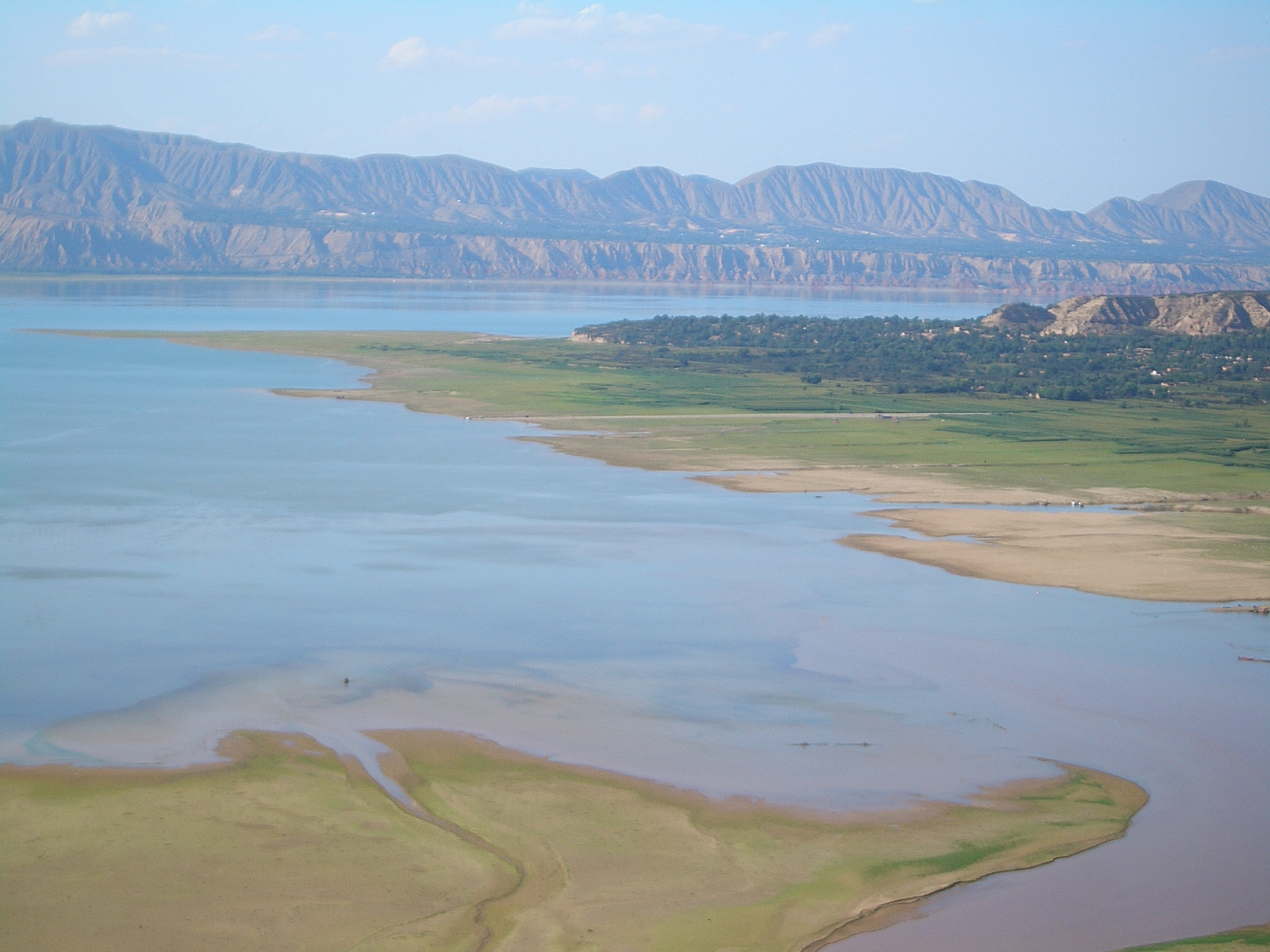
The mouth of the Daxia River (coming from bottom right), flowing into the Yellow River's Liujiaxia Reservoir in Linxia, Gansu

=== Middle reaches ===
The Ordos Loop formed by an enormous twist of the Yellow River, beginning at Zhongning County in Ningxia and ending with a drastic eastward turn at its confluence with the Wei at Tongguan in Shaanxi. However, the official division for the middle reaches of the river run from Hekou in Togtoh County, Inner Mongolia, to Zhengzhou, Henan. The middle reaches are 1,206 km (749 mi) long, with a basin area of 344,000 square kilometers (133,000 sq mi), 45.7% of the total, with a total elevation drop of 890 m (2,920 ft), an average drop of 0.074%. There are 30 large tributaries along the middle reaches, and the water flow is increased by 43.5% on this stage. The middle reaches contribute 92% of the river's silts.

The middle stream of the Yellow River passes through the Loess Plateau, where substantial erosion takes place. The large amount of mud and sand discharged into the river makes the Yellow River the most sediment-laden river in the world. The highest recorded annual level of silts discharged into the Yellow River is 3.91 billion tons in 1933. The highest silt concentration level was recorded in 1977 at 920 kg/m^{3} (57.4 lb/ft^{3}). These sediments later deposit in the slower lower reaches of the river, elevating the river bed and creating the famous "river above ground". From Hekou to Yumenkou, the river passes through the longest series of continuous valleys on its main course, collectively called the Jinshan Valley. The abundant hydrodynamic resources stored in this section make it the second most suitable area to build hydroelectric power plants. The famous Hukou Waterfall is in the lower part of this valley on the border of Shanxi and Shaanxi.

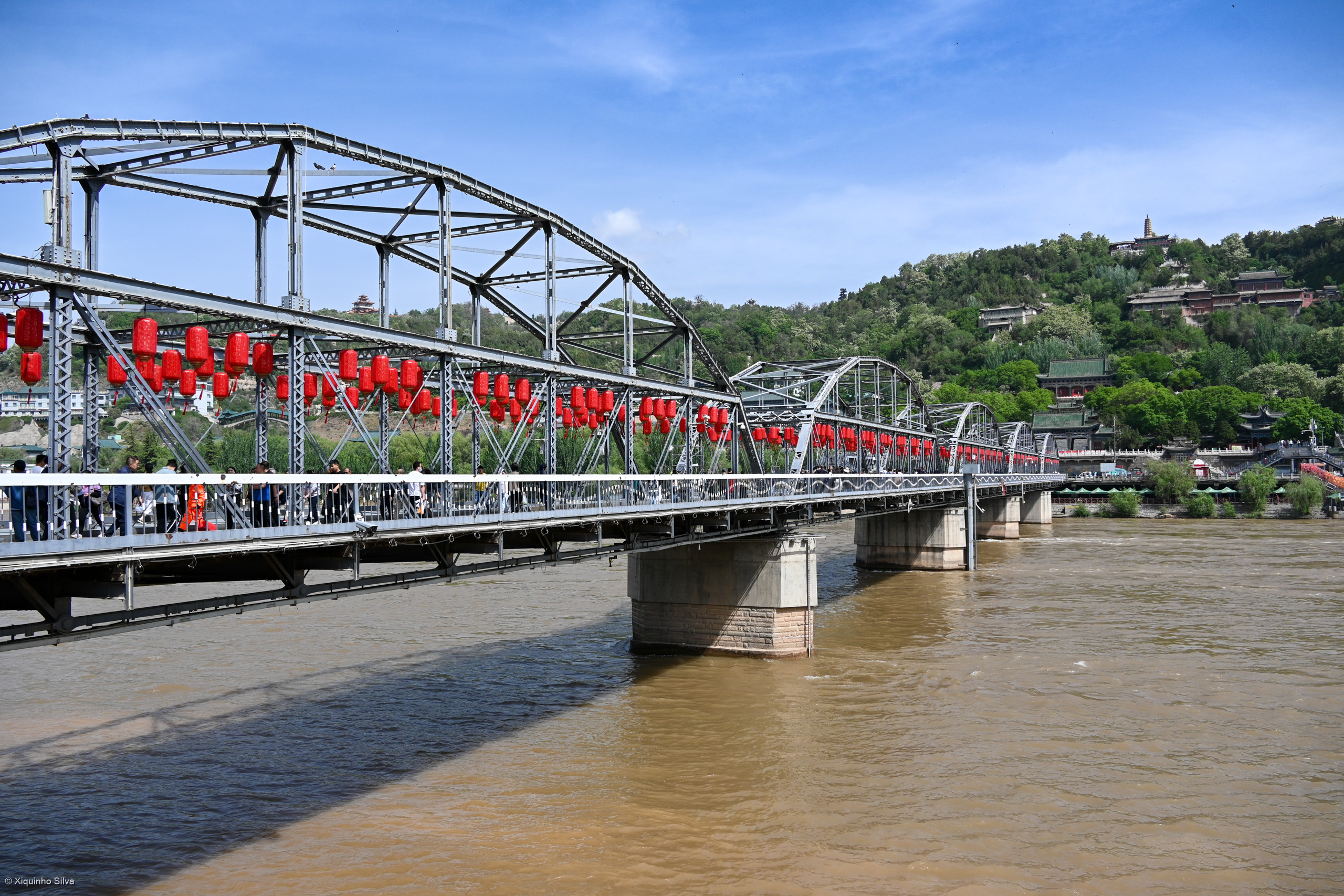
At Lanzhou, Gansu

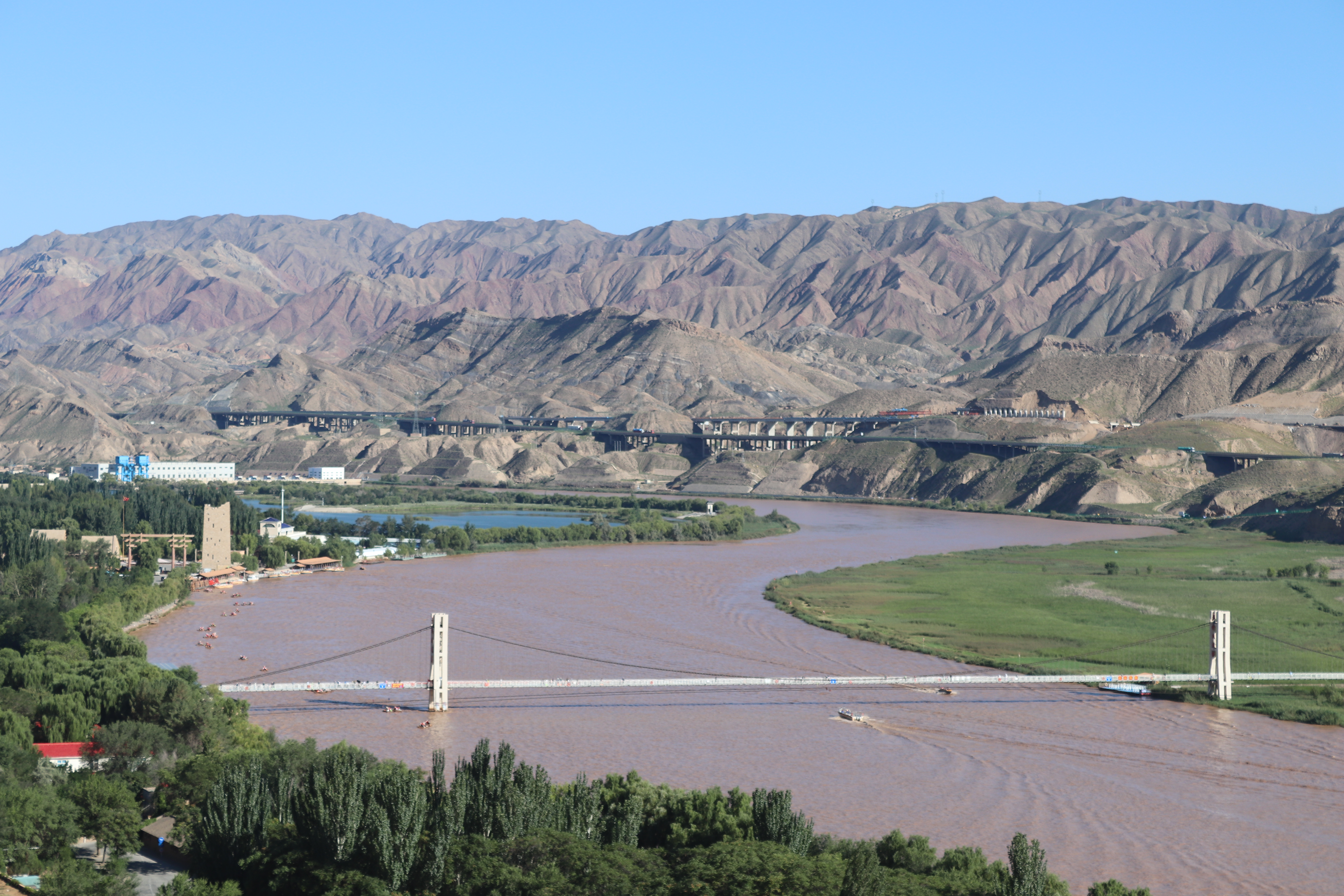
At Shapotou, Ningxia, with desert surrounding it

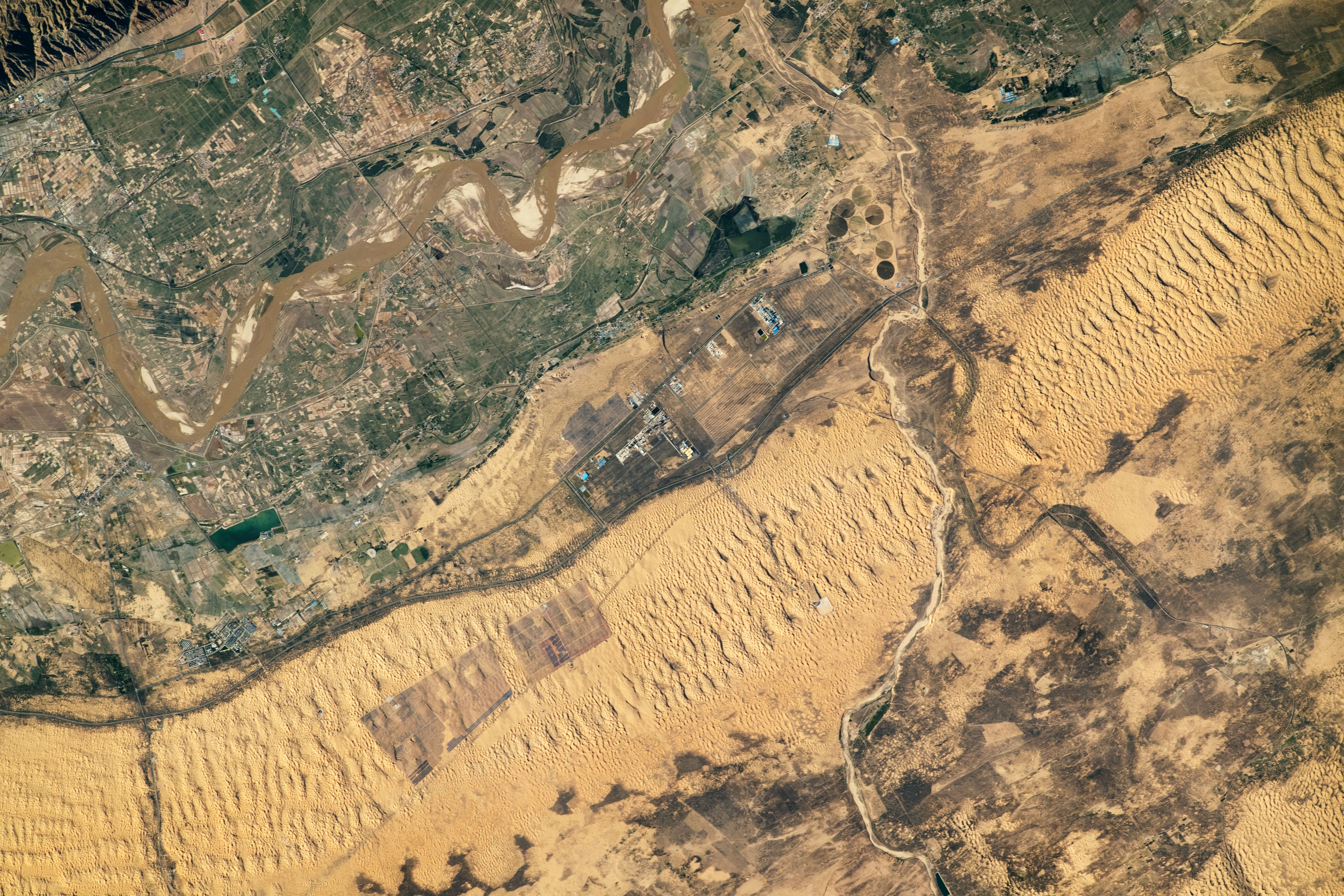
At Dalad, Baotou, Inner Mongolia

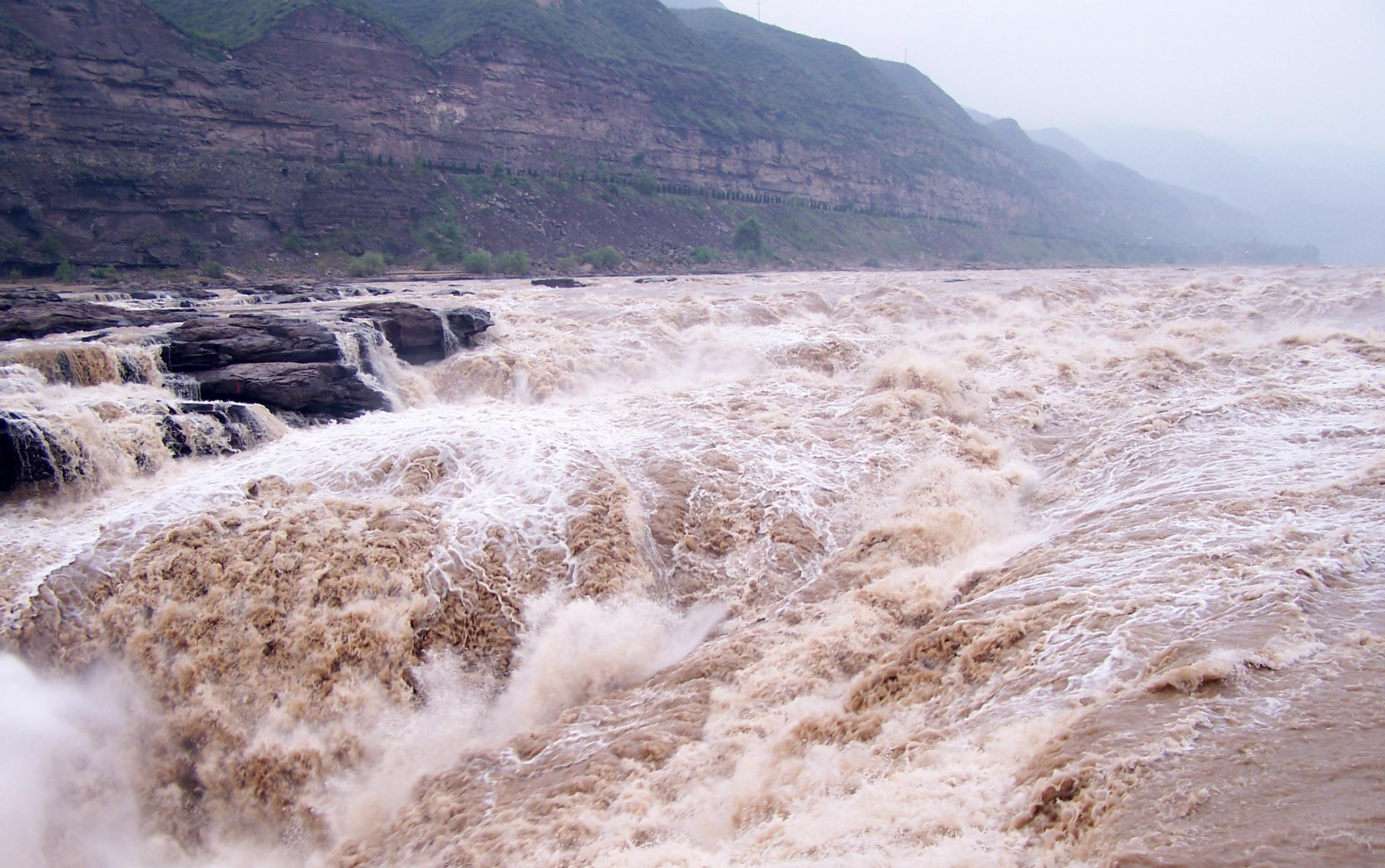
Hukou Waterfalls in Yichuan, Shaanxi

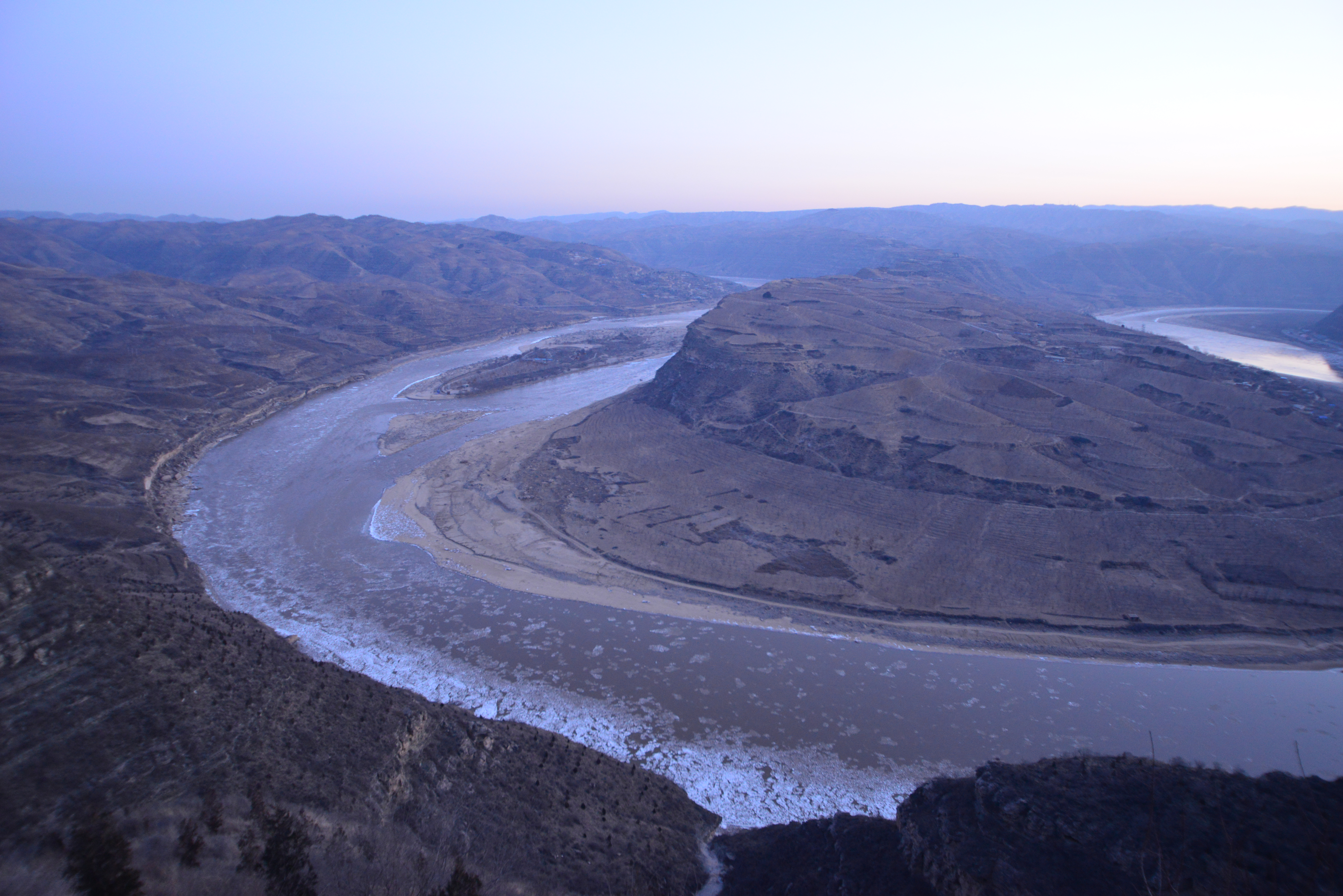
Qiankun bend in Yonghe, Shanxi

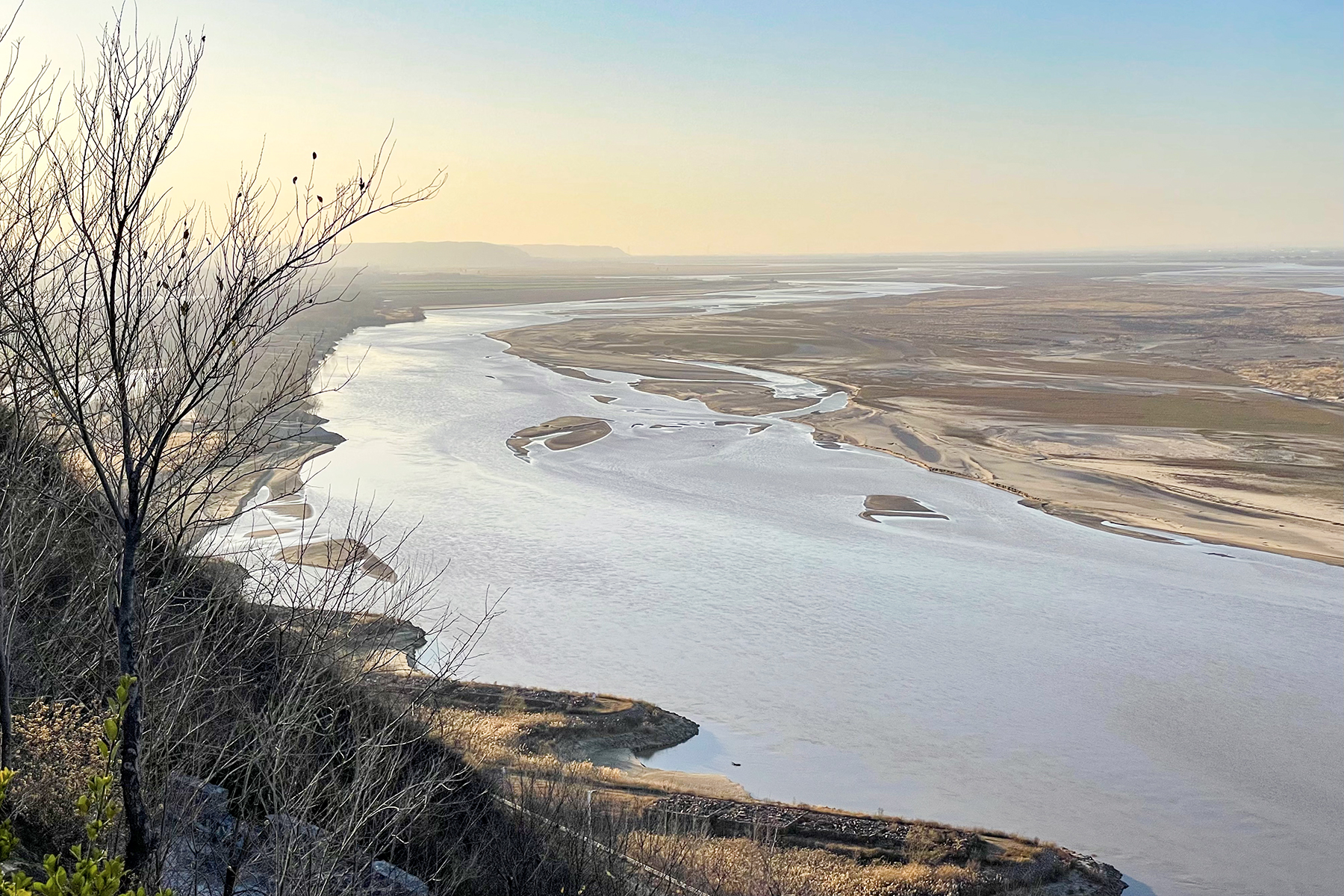
At Xingyang, Henan

=== Lower reaches ===
In the lower reaches, from Zhengzhou to its mouth, a distance of 786 km (488 mi), the river is confined to a levee-lined course as it flows to the northeast across the North China Plain before emptying into the Bohai Sea. The basin area in this stage is only 23,000 square kilometers (8,900 sq mi), a mere 3% of the total, because few tributaries add to the flow in this stage; nearly all rivers to the south drain into the Huai River, whereas those to the north drain into the Hai River. The Huai River Basin, for example, is separated from the Yellow River Basin by the south dike of the Yellow River. The total drop in elevation of the lower reaches is 93.6 m (307 ft), with an average grade of 0.012%.

The silts received from the middle reaches form sediments here, elevating the river bed. Excessive sediment deposits have raised the riverbed several meters above the surrounding ground. That is why this part of the river is called the 'Earth Suspended River'. At Kaifeng, Henan, the Yellow River is 10 meters (33 ft) above the ground level.

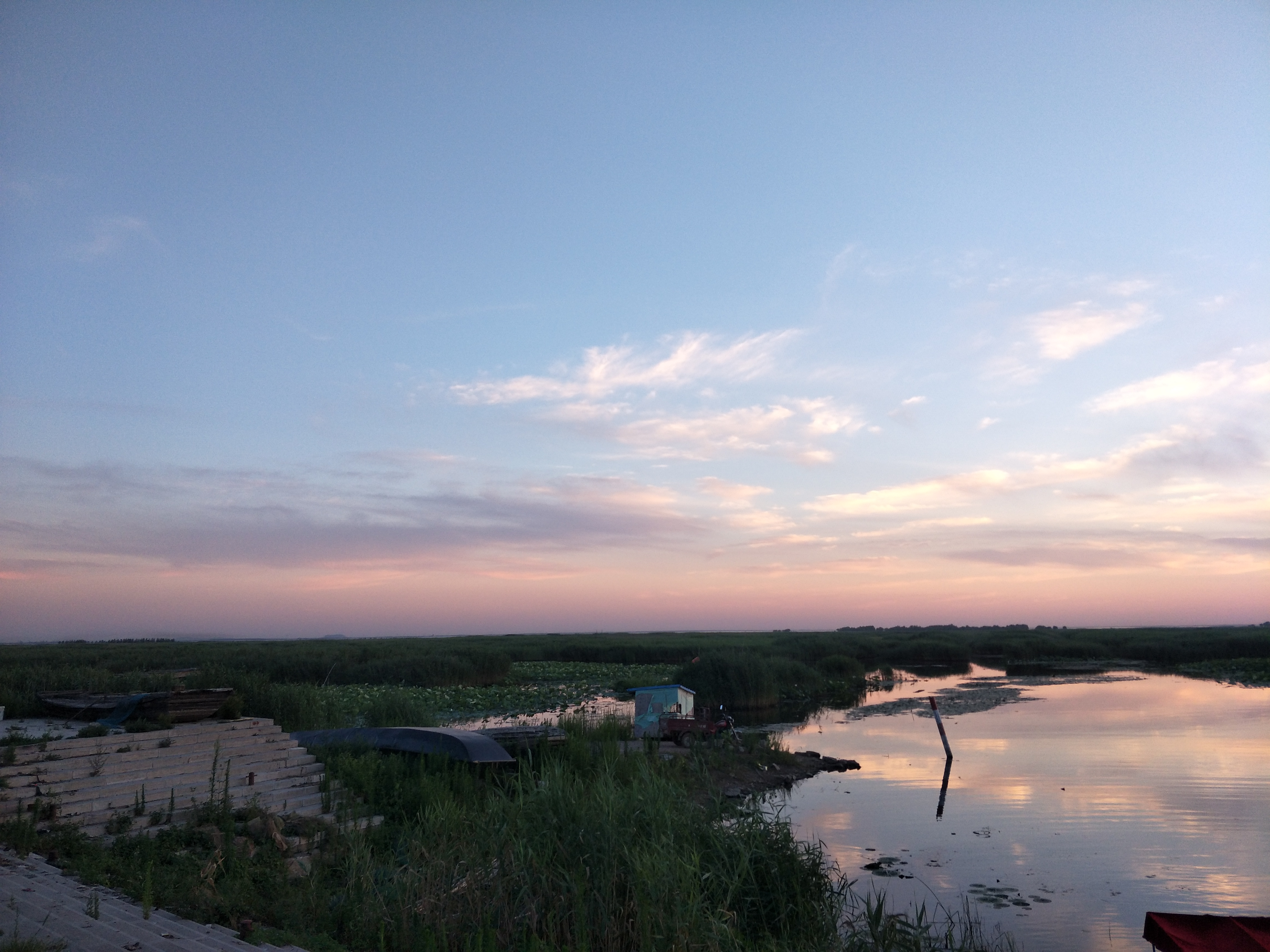
Dongping Lake, the largest tributary in lower reaches of Yellow River

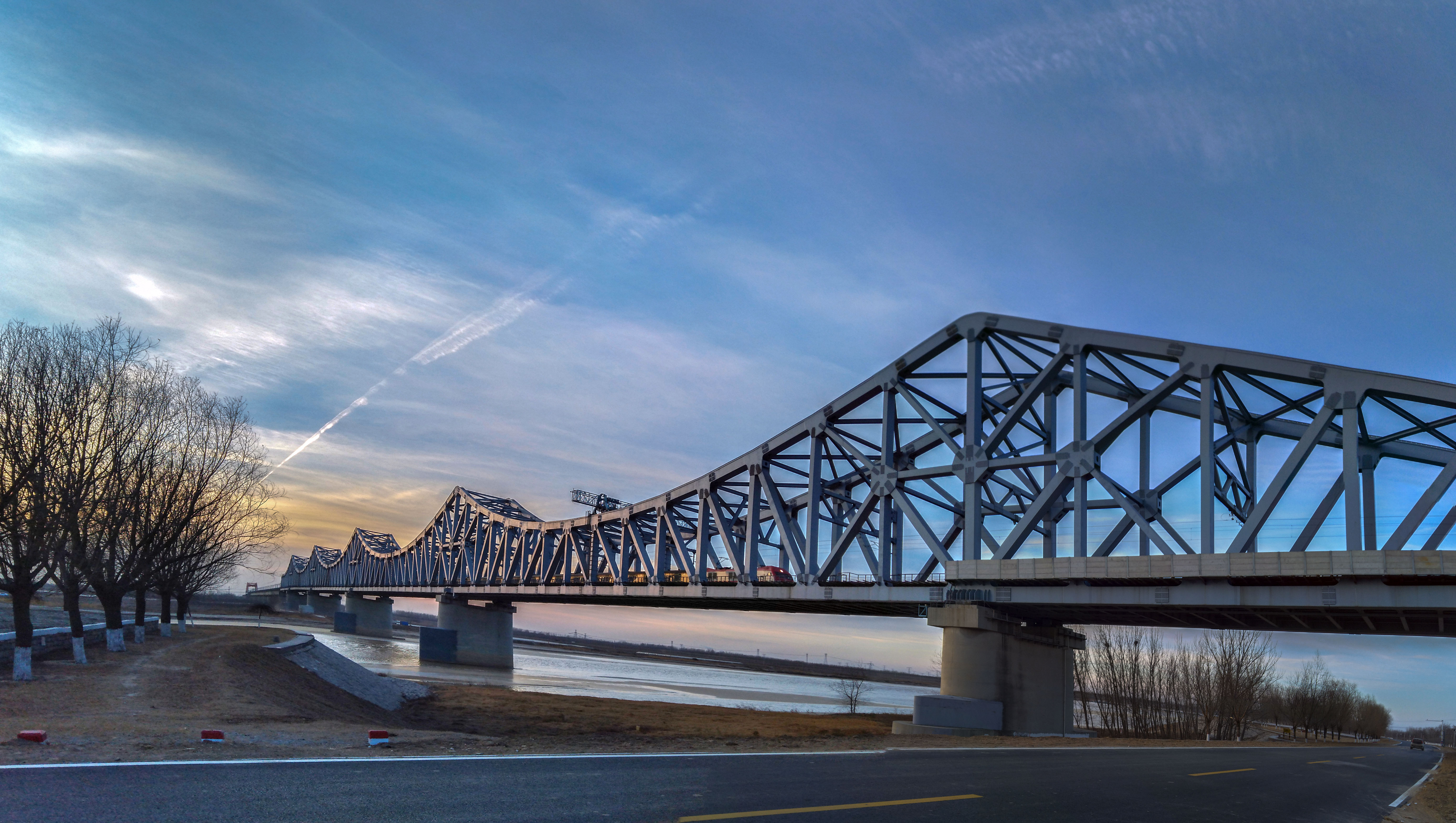
Train No. K1531 passes Longju Bridge over Yellow River near Lijin, Shandong

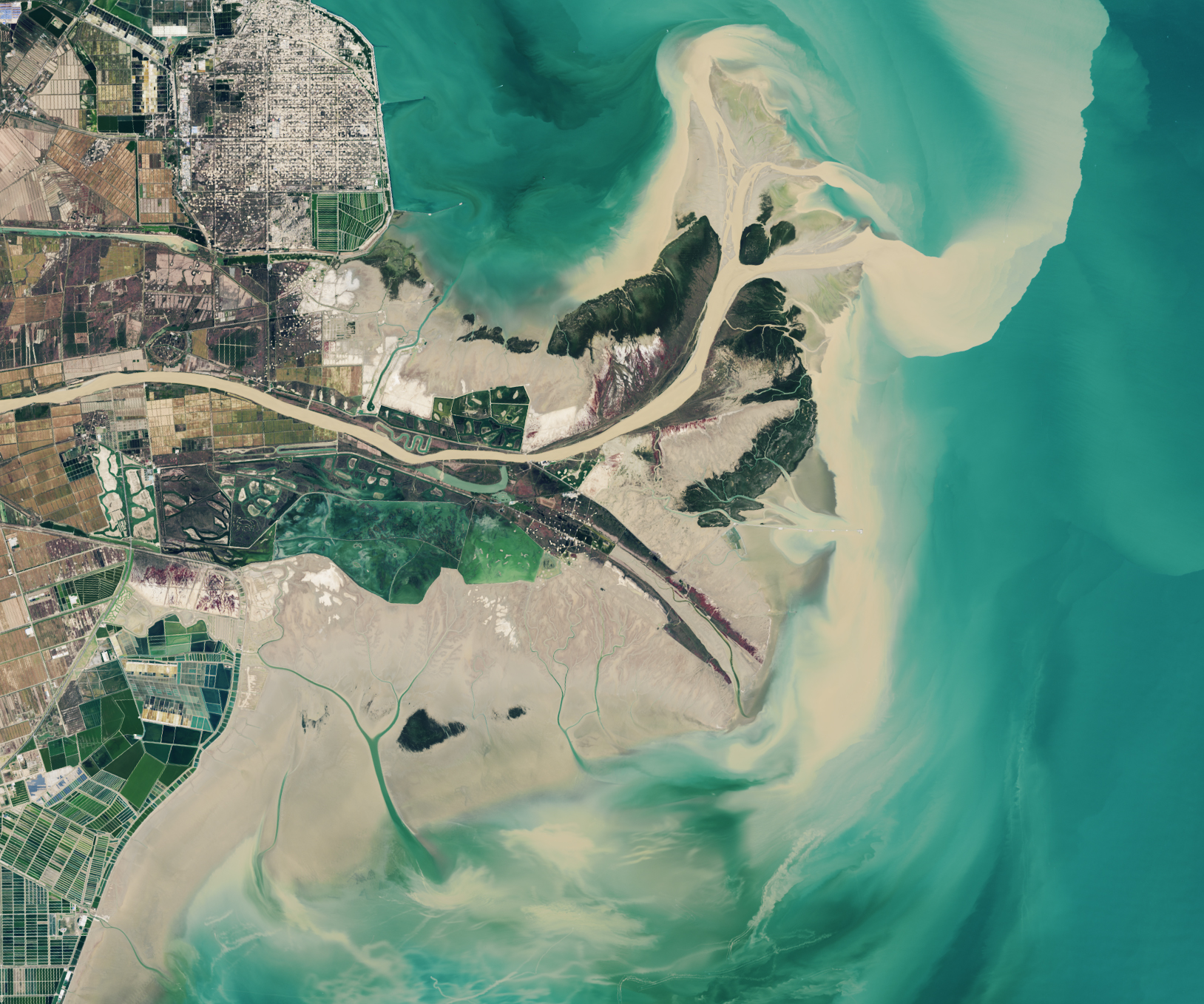
Yellow River Delta

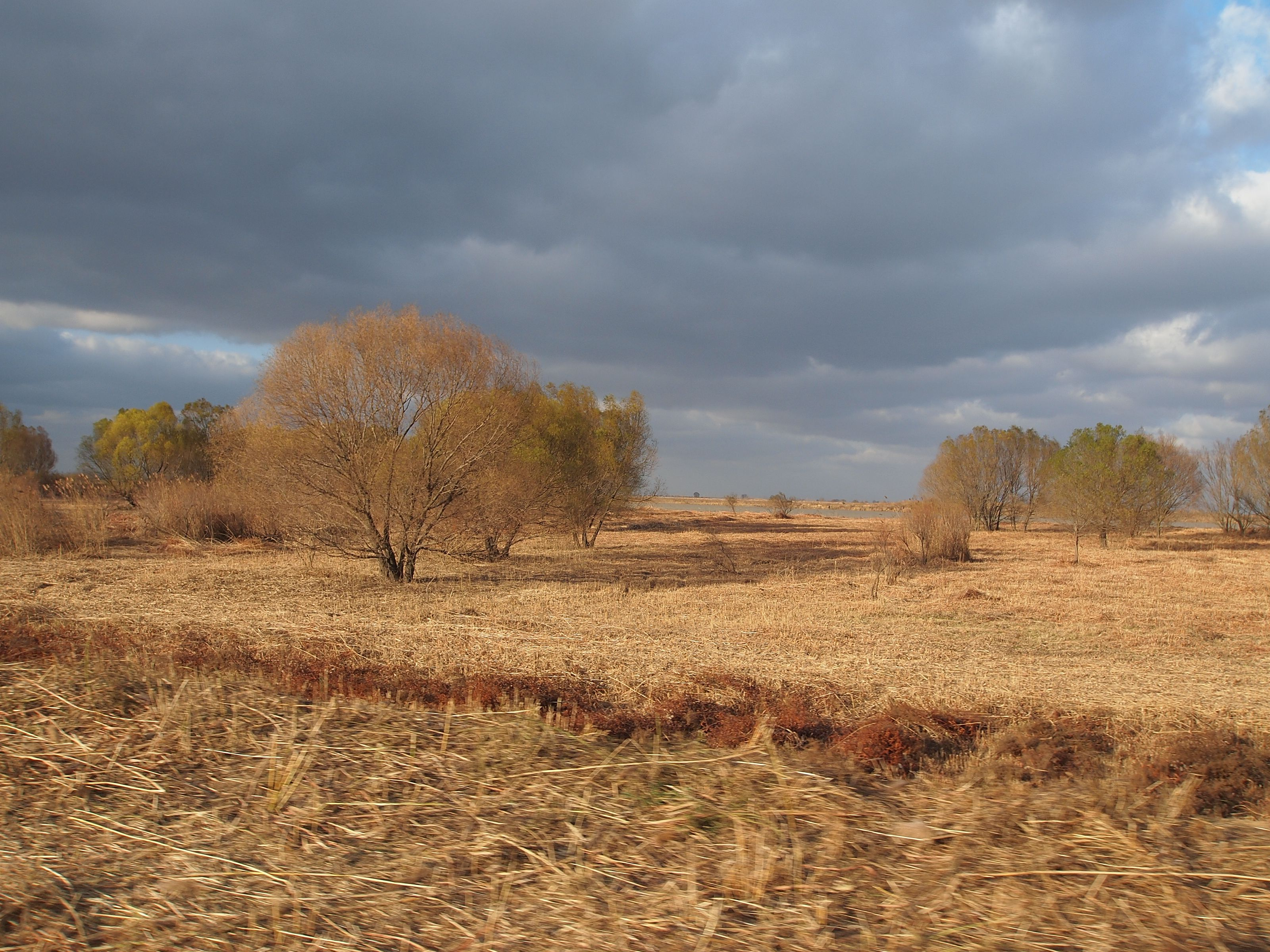
Willows near the delta at Dongying, Shandong

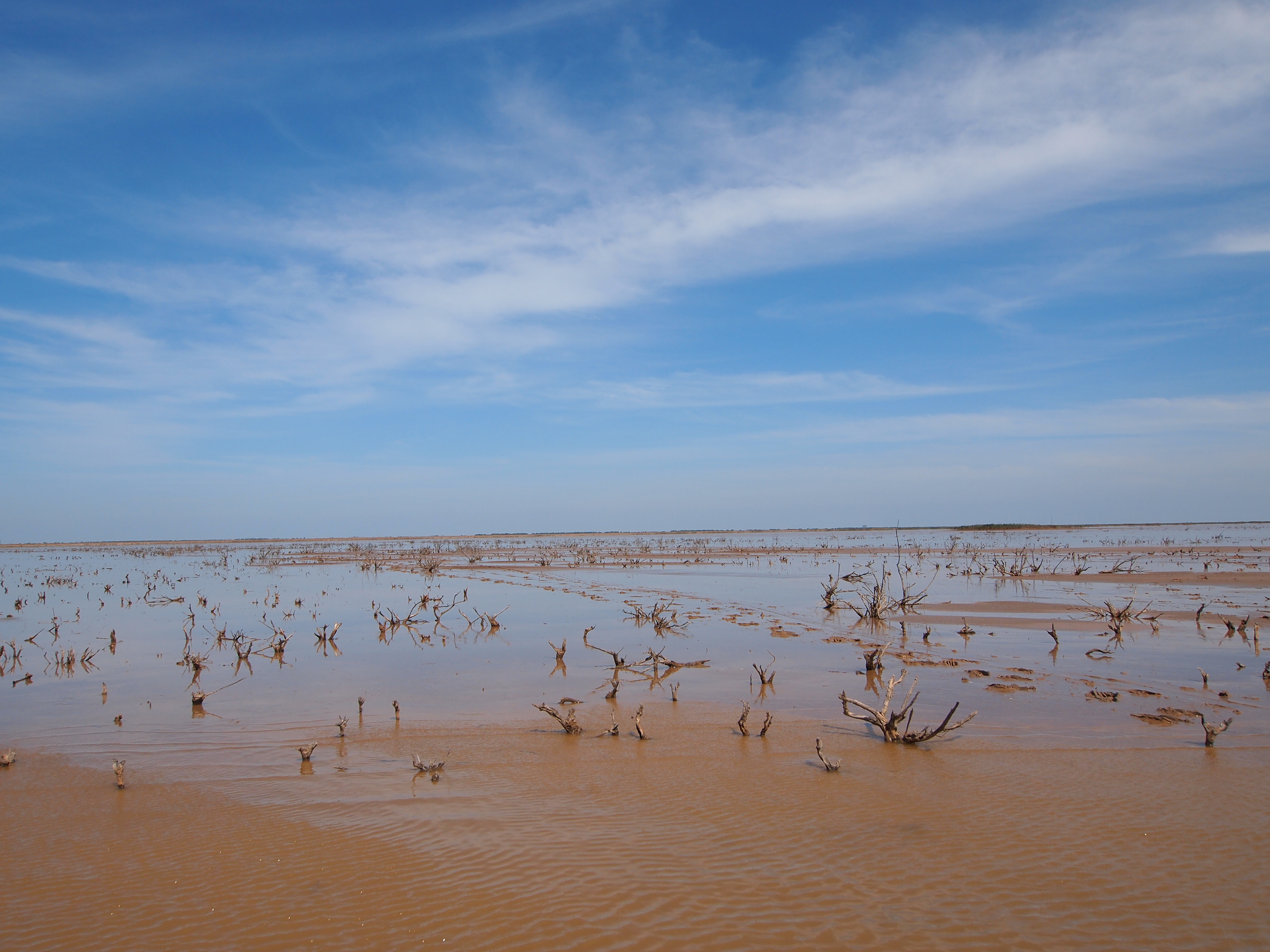
Mudflat near the delta

=== Tributaries ===
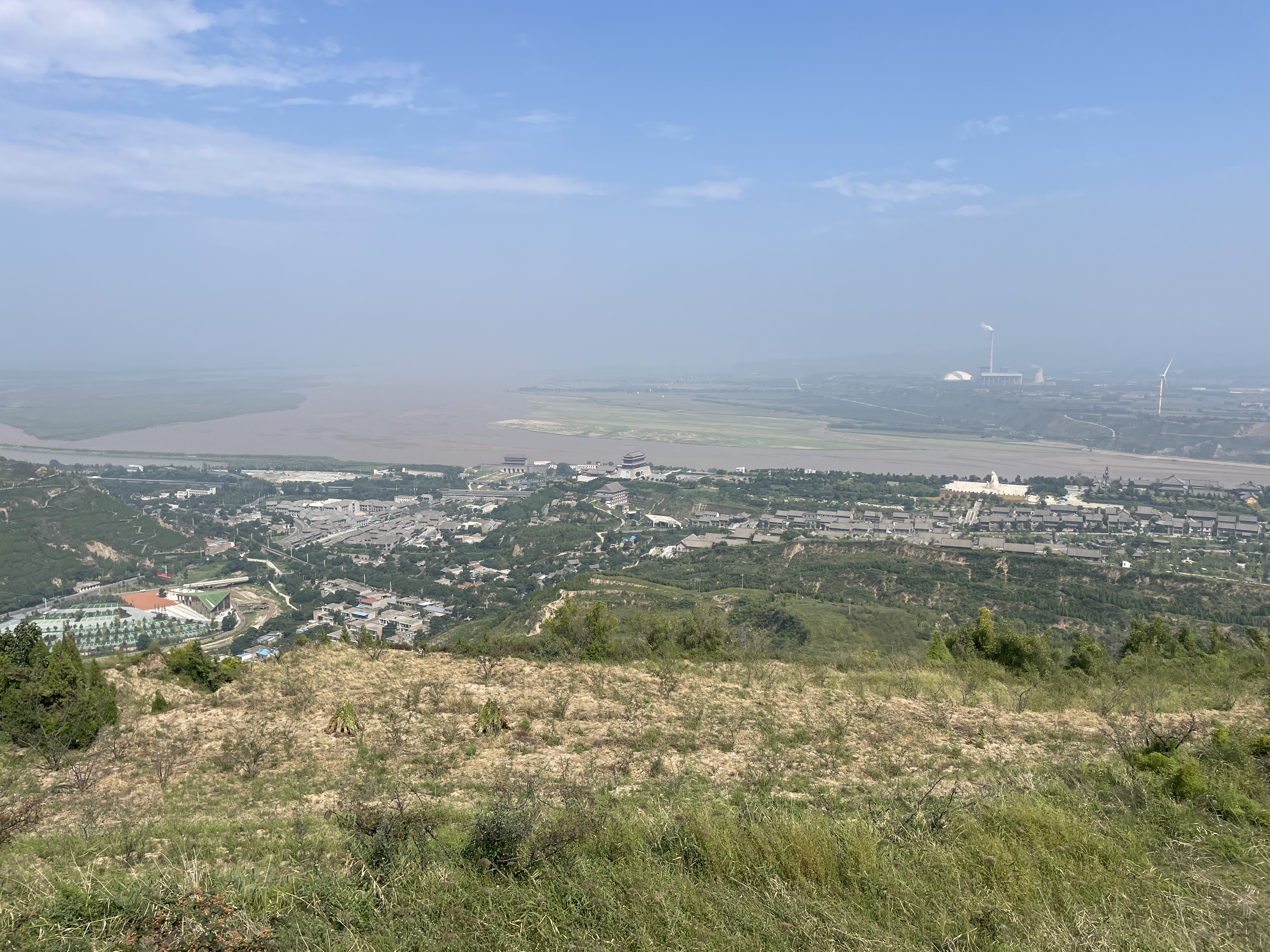
The confluence of the Yellow River and the Wei River, the largest tributary of the Yellow River, has long been a strategically significant location in Chinese history. The Tong Pass was built here, which can be seen in the front of the image

Tributaries of the Yellow River listed from its source to its mouth include:

- White River
- Daxia River
- Tao River
- Huang Shui
  - Datong River
- Zhuanglang River
- Zuli River
- Qingshui River
- Dahei River
- Kuye River
- Wuding River
- Fen River
- Wei River (the Wei River is the largest of these tributaries)
- Luo River
- Qin River
- Dawen River

The lower reaches of the Yellow River have no tributaries.

== Characteristics ==
Expansion of the Yellow River Delta from 1989 to 2009 in five-year intervals.

The Yellow River is notable for the large amount of silt it carries—1.6 billion tons annually at the point where it descends from the Loess Plateau. If it is running to the sea with sufficient volume, 1.4 billion tons are carried to the sea per year. One estimate gives 34 kilograms of silt per cubic meter, as opposed to 10 for the Colorado and 1 for the Nile.

Its average discharge is said to be 2,110 cubic meters per second (32,000 for the Yangtze), with a maximum of 25,000 and minimum of 245. However, since 1972, it often runs dry before it reaches the sea. The low volume is due to increased agricultural irrigation, increased by a factor of five since 1950. Water diverted from the river as of 1999 served 140 million people and irrigated 74,000 km^{2} (29,000 sq mi) of land. The Yellow River delta totals 8,000 square kilometers (3,100 square miles). However, with the decrease in silt reaching the sea, it has been reported to be shrinking slightly each year since 1996 through erosion.

The highest volume occurs during the rainy season from July to October, when 60% of the annual volume of the river flows. Maximum demand for irrigation is needed between March and June. In order to capture excess water for use when needed and for flood control and electricity generation, several dams have been built, but their expected life is limited due to the high silt load. A proposed South–North Water Transfer Project involves several schemes to divert water from the Yangtze: one in the western headwaters of the rivers where they are closest to one another, another from the upper reaches of the Han River, and a third using the route of the old Grand Canal.

Due to its heavy load of silt the Yellow River is a depositing stream – that is, it deposits part of its carried burden of soil in its bed in stretches where it is flowing slowly. These deposits elevate the riverbed which flows between natural levees in its lower reaches. Should a flood occur, the river may break out of the levees into the surrounding lower flood plain and take a new channel. Historically this has occurred about once every hundred years. In modern times, considerable effort has been made to strengthen levees and control floods.

== Hydroelectric power dams ==
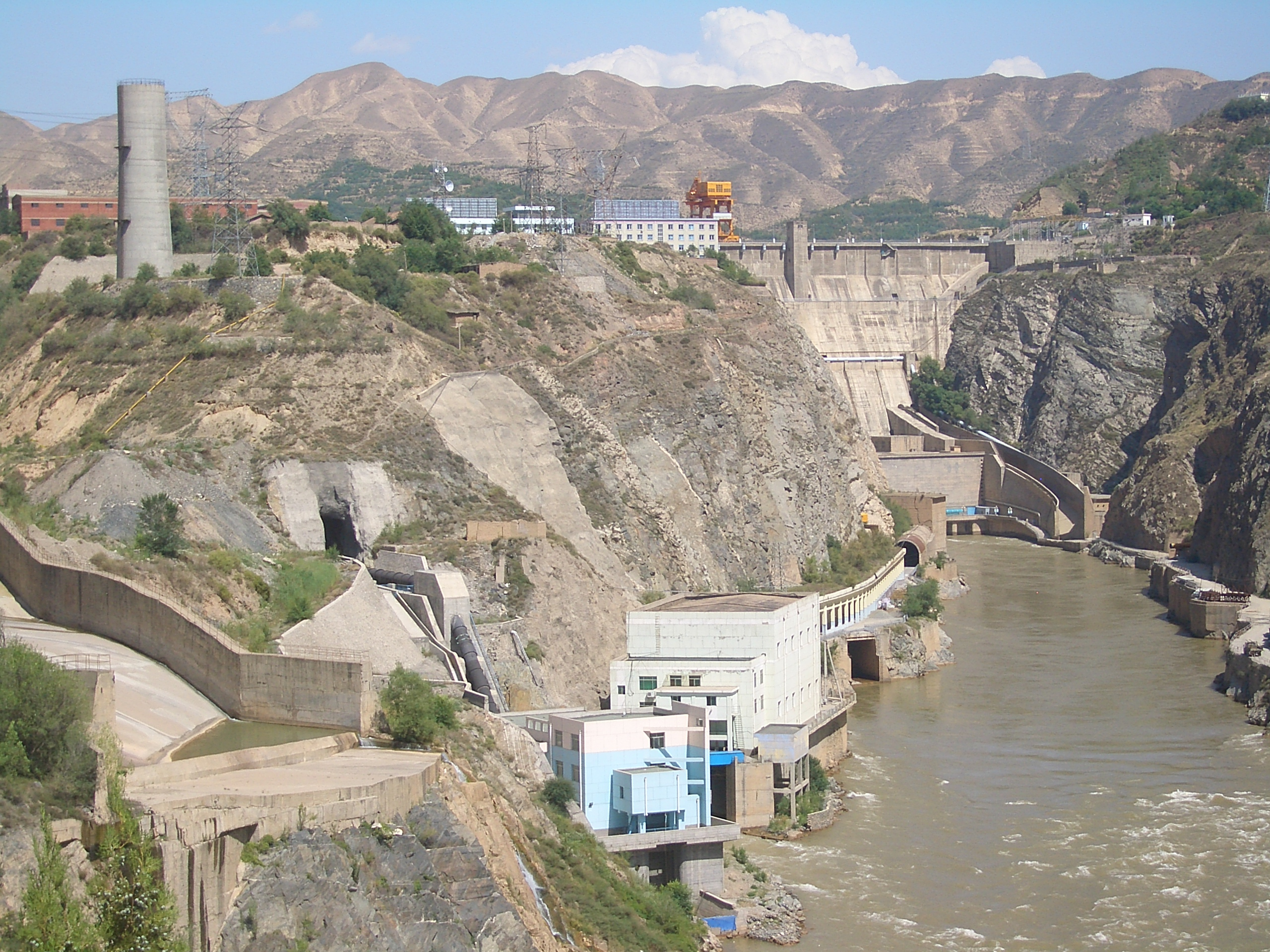
Liujiaxia Dam, Gansu

Below is an incomplete list of hydroelectric power stations built on the Yellow River, arranged according to the first year of operation (in brackets):

- Sanmenxia Dam (1960; Sanmenxia, Henan)
- Sanshenggong Dam (1966; Dengkou County part of Bayannur, Inner Mongolia)
- Qingtong Gorge Hydroelectric Power Station (1968; Qingtongxia, Ningxia)
- Liujiaxia Dam (Liujia Gorge) (1974; Yongjing County, Gansu)
- Lijiaxia Dam (1997) (Jainca County, Qinghai)
- Yanguoxia Dam (Yanguo Gorge) hydroelectric power station (1975; Yongjing County, Gansu)
- Tianqiao Dam (1977, Border at Baode County, Shanxi and Fugu County, Shaanxi)
- Bapanxia Dam (Bapan Gorge) (1980; Xigu District, Lanzhou, Gansu)
- Longyangxia Dam (1992; Gonghe County, Qinghai)
- Da Gorge hydroelectric power station (1998, Lanzhou, Gansu)
- Li Gorge hydroelectric power station (1999, Hualong County, Haidong, Qinghai)
- Wanjiazhai Dam (1999; Pianguan County, Shaanxi and Inner Mongolia)
- Xiaolangdi Dam (2001) (Jiyuan, Henan)
- Laxiwa Dam (2010) (Guide County, Qinghai)
- Yangqu Dam (2016) (Xinghai County, Qinghai)
- Maerdang Dam (2018) (Maqên County, Qinghai)

As reported in 2000, the 7 largest hydro power plants (Longyangxia, Lijiaxia, Liujiaxia, Yanguoxia, Bapanxia, Daxia and Qinglongxia) had the total installed capacity of 5,618 MW.

== Crossings ==
Major cities along the Yellow River

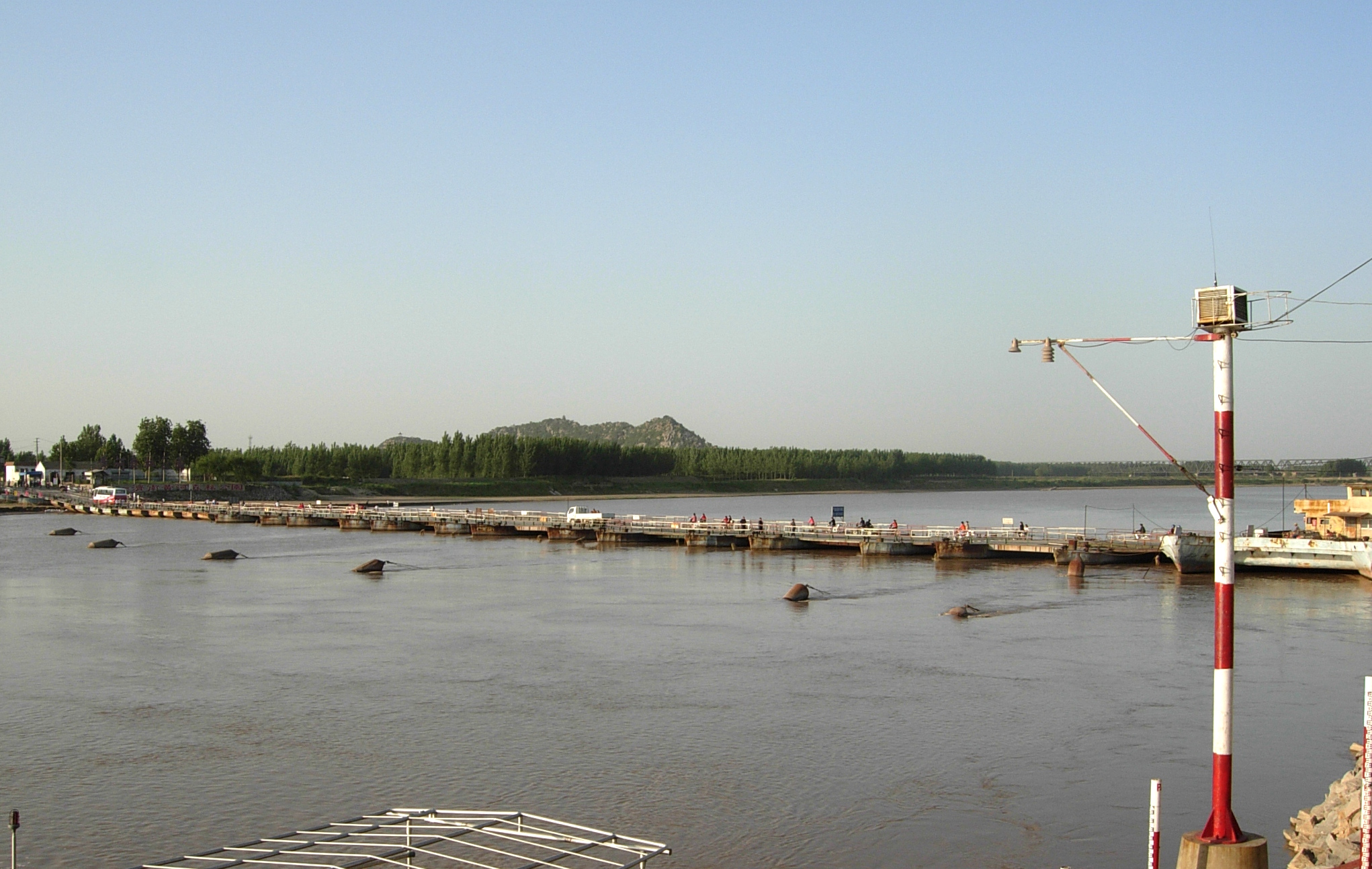
Pontoon bridge (Luokou Pontoon Bridge simplified Chinese: 泺口浮桥; traditional Chinese: 濼口浮橋; pinyin: Luòkǒu Fúqiáo) over the Yellow River in Jinan, Shandong

The main bridges and ferries by the province names in the order of downstream to upstream are:

Shandong

- Dongying Yellow River Bridge
- Shengli Yellow River Bridge (Dongying)
- Lijin Yellow River Bridge (Dongying)
- Binzhou Yellow River Road-Railway Bridge
- Binzhou Yellow River Highway Bridge
- Binzhou–Laiwu Expressway Binzhou Yellow River Bridge (Binzhou–Zibo)
- Huiqing Yellow River Bridge (Binzhou–Zibo)
- Jiyang Yellow River Bridge (Jinan)
- G20 Qingdao–Yinchuan Expressway Jinan Yellow River Bridge (Jinan)
- Jinan Yellow River Bridge
- Luokou Yellow River Railway Bridge (Jinan)
- Jinan Jianbang Yellow River Bridge
- Beijing–Shanghai High-speed Railway Jinan Yellow River Bridge (Jinan–Dezhou)
- Beijing–Taipei Expressway Jinan Yellow River Bridge (Jinan–Dezhou)
- Beijing–Shanghai Railway Jinan Yellow River New Bridge (Jinan–Dezhou)
- Pingyin Yellow River Bridge (Jinan-Liaocheng)

Shandong–Henan

- Beijing–Kowloon Railway Sunkou Yellow River Bridge (Jining–Puyang)
- Juancheng Yellow River Highway Bridge (Heze–Puyang)
- Dongming Yellow River Highway Bridge (Heze–Puyang)

Henan

- Kaifeng Yellow River Bridge (Kaifeng)
- Zhengzhou Yellow River Bridge (Zhengzhou)

Shanxi–Henan

- Sanmen Yellow River Bridge (Sanmenxia)

Shaanxi–Henan

- Hancheng Yumenkou Yellow River Bridge

Ningxia

- Yinchuan Yellow River Bridge (Yinchuan)

Inner Mongolia

- Baotou Yellow River Bridge (Baotou)

Gansu

- Lanzhou Yellow River Bridge
- Zhongshan Bridge (Lanzhou)

Qinghai

- Dari Yellow River Bridge
- Jianzha Yellow River Bridge

== Fauna ==
=== Fish ===
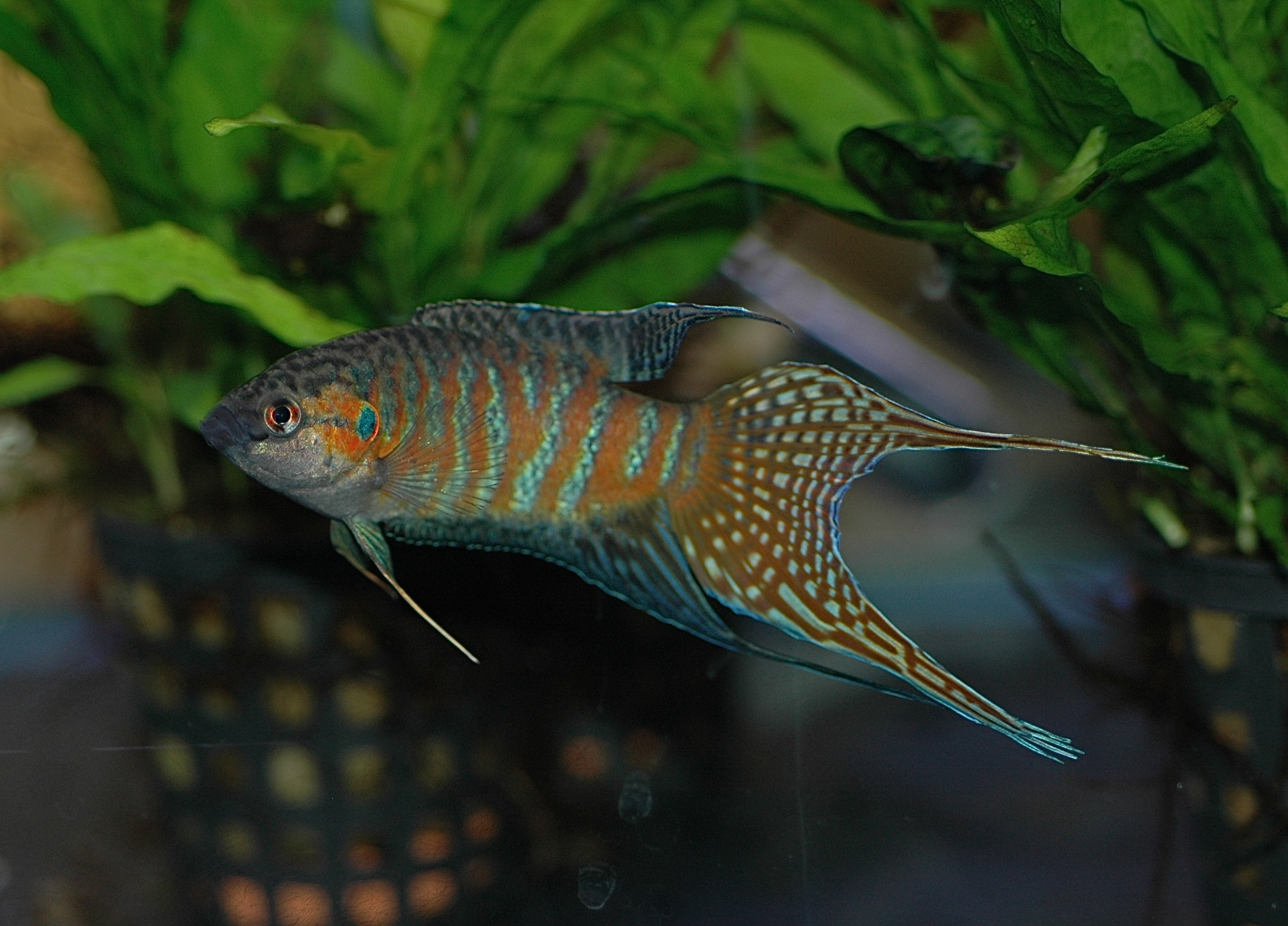
The paradise fish is well known in the aquarium hobby and it originates from East Asian river basins, including the Yellow River

The Yellow River basin is rich in fish, being the home of more than 160 native species in 92 genera and 28 families, including 19 species found nowhere else in the world (endemic). However, due to habitat loss, pollution, introduced species and overfishing many of the natives have declined or disappeared entirely; several are recognized as threatened on China's Red List. Dams and their reservoirs have increased the habitat for species of slow-moving and static waters, while it excluded species of flowing waters and prevented the up- and down-stream breeding migration of others. In the 2000s, only 80 native fish in 63 genera and 18 families were recorded in the Yellow River basin. In contrast, introduced fish have risen in both abundance and number of species; only one introduced fish species was recorded in the 1960s when ichthyologist Li Sizhong published his original survey of fish fauna of the region, but by the 2000s there were 26.

As typical of Asian rivers, Cyprinidae is by far the most diverse family in the Yellow River basin. More than 85 cyprinids have been recorded in this basin, including species that still are present and species that no longer are present. Other highly diverse families are the stone loaches (more than 20 species), gobies (c. 15 species), true loaches (c. 10 species) and bagrid catfish (c. 10 species). Although there are species found throughout much of the river, several have a more restricted range. For example, the uppermost, highest parts on the Qinghai–Tibet Plateau has relatively few native species, notably snowtrout and allies (Gymnocypris, Gymnodiptychus, Platypharodon and Schizopygopsis), and Triplophysa loaches. Of the 18 endemics in the Yellow River basin, 12 are (or were) found in the upper part. These in particular have become threatened and the fish fauna in many headwaters are now dominated by introduced salmonids. In contrast, the lowermost part of the river and its delta are home to a number of brackish water or euryhaline species, like gobies (although there are also true freshwater gobies in the Yellow River), Asian seabasses, flatfish and Takifugu pufferfish.

Fishing remains an important activity, but catches have declined. In 2007, it was noted that 40% fewer fish were caught in the Yellow River compared to earlier catches. Large cyprinids (Asian carp, predatory carp, Wuchang bream and Mongolian redfin) and large catfish (Amur and Lanzhou catfish) are still present, but the largest species, the Chinese paddlefish, kaluga sturgeon and Yangtze sturgeon, have not been reported from the Yellow River basin in about 50 years. Other species that support important fisheries include white Amur bream, ayu, mandarin fish, Protosalanx icefish, northern snakehead, Asian swamp eel and others.

An annual fishing ban has been implemented since 2018, covering the entire Yellow River basin from 1 April to 30 June each year. A total ban of fishing of natural fishes is being implemented in the upper reaches of the Yellow River starting 1 April 2022, covering Qinghai, Sichuan and Gansu provinces, until the end of 2025. For the rest of the basin, the annual ban is extended to a period from 1 April to 31 July.

=== Aquaculture ===
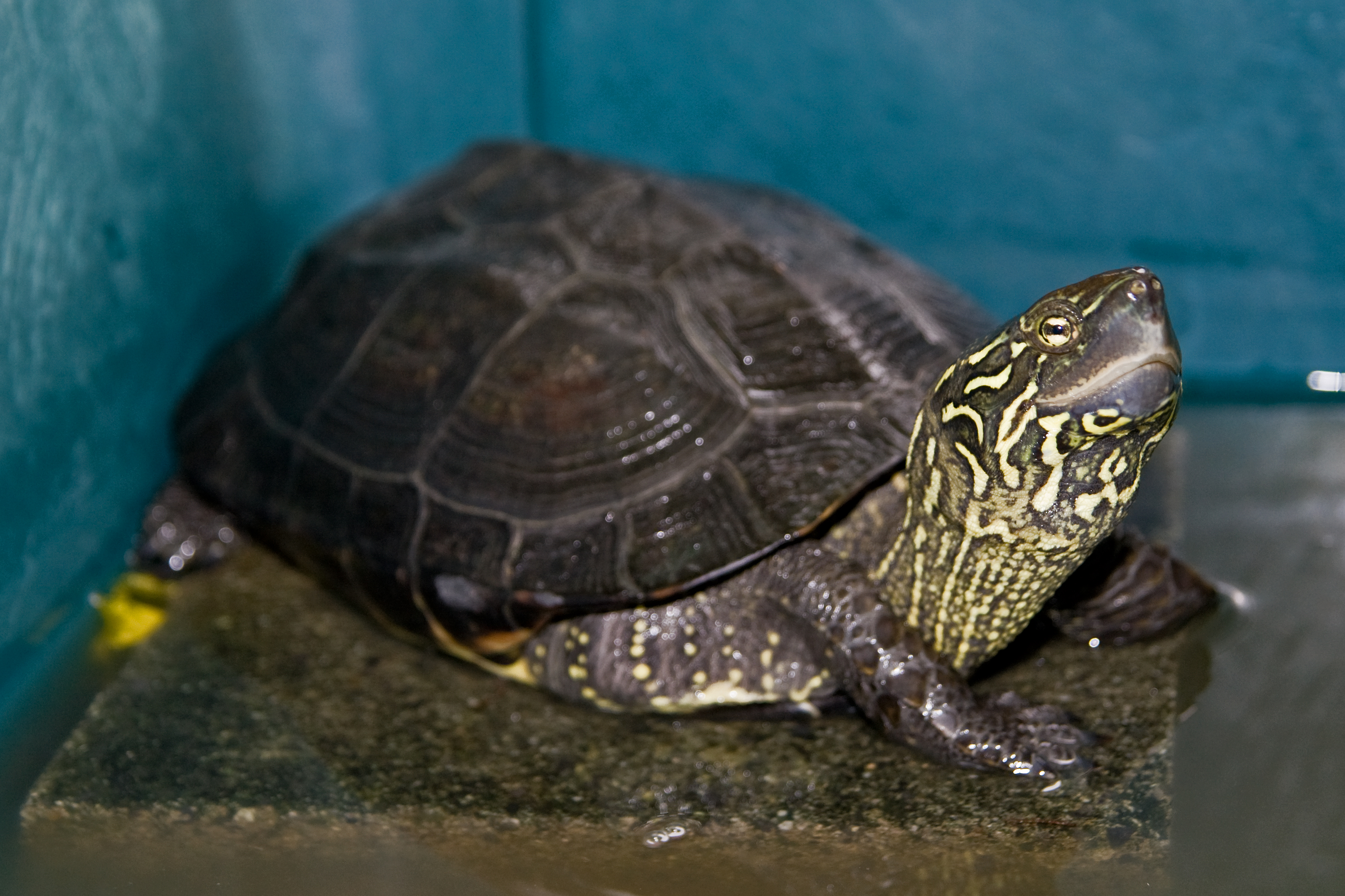
The Chinese pond turtle (shown) and Chinese softshell turtle are both native to the Yellow River, but also farmed in large numbers

The Yellow River is generally less suitable for aquaculture than the rivers of central and southern China, such as the Yangtze or Pearl rivers, but aquaculture is also practiced in some areas along the Yellow River. An important aquaculture area is the riverside plain in Xingyang, upstream from Zhengzhou. Since the development of fish ponds started in Xingyang's riverside Wangcun Town in 1986, the pond systems in Wangcun have grown to the total size of 15,000 mu (10 km^{2}), making the town the largest aquaculture center in north China.

Two turtle species are native to the Yellow River basin: the Chinese pond turtle and Chinese softshell turtle. Both species—but especially the softshell—are widely farmed for food. A variety of the Chinese softshell turtle popular in Chinese gourmets is called the Yellow River turtle (黄河鳖). Nowadays most of the Yellow River turtles eaten in China's restaurants comes from turtle farms, which may or may not be near the Yellow River. In 2007, construction started in Wangcun, Henan on a large farm for raising this turtle variety. With the capacity for raising 5 million turtles a year, the facility was expected to become Henan's largest farm of this kind.

The huge, entirely aquatic Chinese giant salamander, a species that has declined drastically due primarily to persecution for food and traditional medicine, is native to the Yellow River and other Chinese rivers. It is farmed in large numbers in several parts of China and genetic studies have revealed that the captive stock mostly is of Yellow River origin. As these often are released back into the wild, the Yellow River type of the Chinese giant salamander has spread to other parts of China, which represents a problem to the other types.

== Flora ==
The Yellow River extends through several ecological regions, including alpine shrubland, steppe, forest, desert, grassland, and saline meadow. Plant life varies greatly depending on location. In the lower regions impacted by human development plant diversity is relatively low, with the flora consisting primarily of seepweed, phragmites, foxtails, kunai grass, and tamerisk.

=== Vegetation changes ===
In abandoned parts of the river delta, woody plant encroachment leads to a decline in herbaceous plant diversity, altering soil characteristics, and potentially impacting the ecological balance and functioning of these wetland ecosystems.

=== Conservation efforts ===
The Shangqiu Yellow River Ancient Course National Forest Park is a man-made forest outside of Shangqiu, cultivated to restore some of the biodiversity of the Yellow River region. The park maintains a rich biodiversity and acts as a resource for research into man-made forests, and provides sanctuary to some endangered species.

== Pollution ==
On 25 November 2008, Tania Branigan of The Guardian filed a report "China's Mother River: the Yellow River", claiming that severe pollution has made one-third of China's Yellow River unusable even for agricultural or industrial use, due to factory discharges and sewage from fast-expanding cities. After reaching the first major city, Xining, the river is heavily polluted. The Yellow River Conservancy Commission had surveyed more than 8,384 mi (13,493 km) of the river in 2007 and said 33.8% of the river system registered worse than "level five" according to the criteria used by the UN Environment Program. Level five is unfit for drinking, aquaculture, industrial use, or even agriculture. The report said waste and sewage discharged into the system last year totaled 4.29b tons. Industry and manufacturing made up 70% of the discharge into the river with households accounting for 23% and just over 6% coming from other sources.

== In culture ==
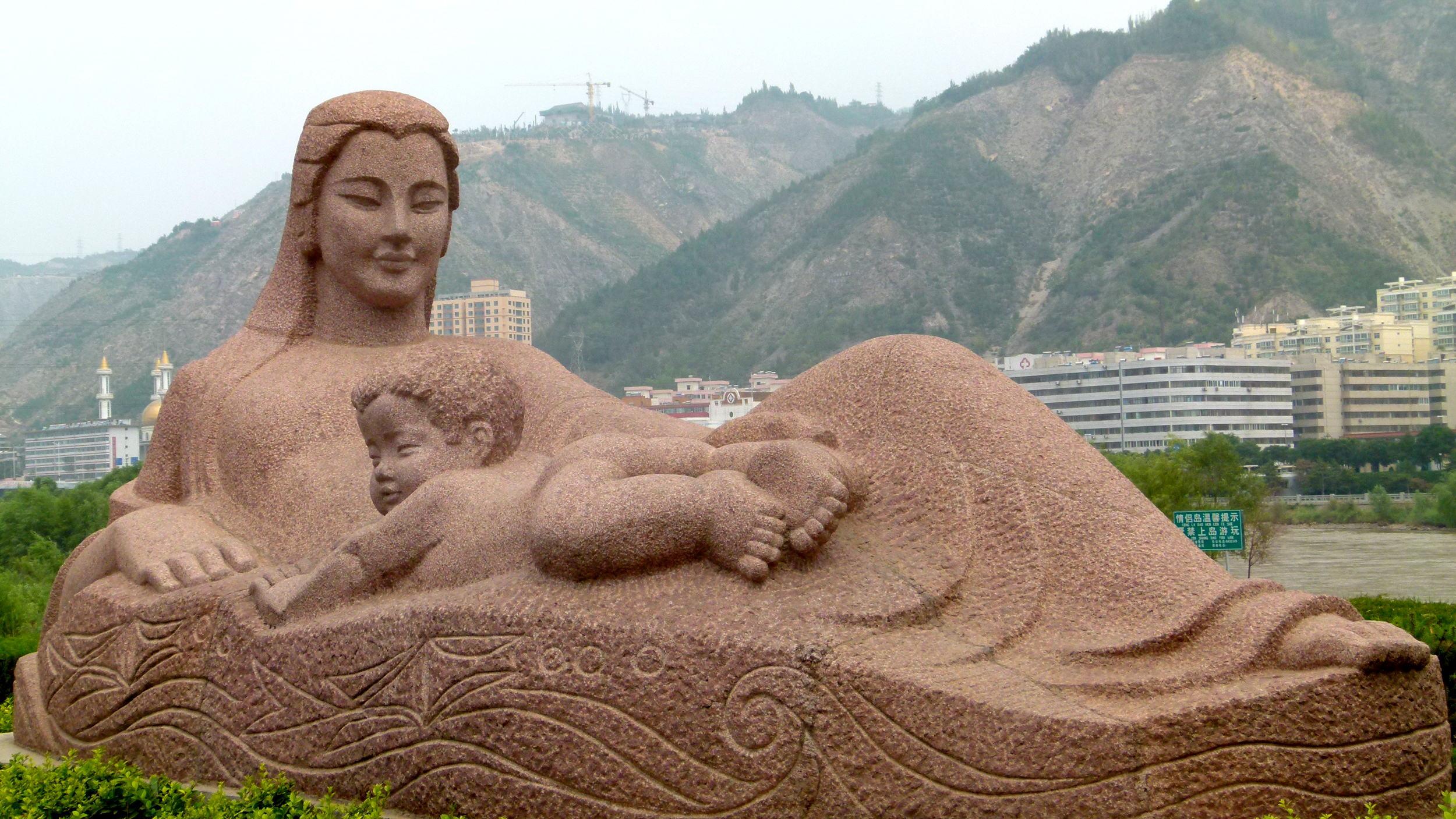
Statue of Mother Yellow River (黄河母亲雕塑) in Lanzhou

The wind is howling, the horses are neighing,
Yellow River is roaring, Yellow River is roaring!
...
In the mountains there are millions of brave soldiers!
And fields are full of heroic guerillas!
All gathered to fight the Japanese invaders!
Take up all pistols and guns.
Hold tight to all swords and lances!
Defend Yellow River!
Defend the North!
Defend the Country!
Defend our Motherland!

— Guang Weiran and Xian Xinghai, Yellow River Cantata, 1939

A traditional belief was that the Yellow River flowed from Heaven as a continuation of the Milky Way. In a Chinese legend, Zhang Qian is said to have been commissioned to find the source of the Yellow River. After sailing up-river for many days, he saw a girl spinning and a cow herd. Upon asking the girl where he was, she presented him with her shuttle with instructions to show it to the astrologer Yan Junping (嚴君平). When he returned, the astrologer recognized it as the shuttle of the Weaving Girl (Vega), and, moreover, said that at the time Zhang received the shuttle, he had seen a wandering star interpose itself between the Weaving Girl and the cow herd (Altair).

The provinces of Hebei and Henan derive their names from the Yellow River. Their names mean, respectively, "North of the River" and "South of the River", although the border between them historically has never been stable, and currently the border between Hebei and Henan is not the Yellow River, but the Zhang River instead.

Mother river and the cradle of Chinese civilization

Traditionally, it is believed that the Chinese civilization originated in the Yellow River basin. The Chinese refer to the river as "the Mother River" and "the cradle of the Chinese civilization". During the long history of China, the Yellow River has been considered a blessing as well as a curse and has been nicknamed both "China's Pride" and "China's Sorrow". In the twentieth-century, the river became a symbol of the rising Chinese nation in the face of Western and Japanese imperialism. Even before the twentieth-century civilizations have passed down via word-of-mouth poems and folktales involving the Yellow River showing the Yellow River itself has been an "emblem of the Chinese spirit".

River of disaster

Despite the Yellow River having a central role in the development of Chinese civilization on the North China Plain, flooding and constant rerouting of the river has also caused great disasters to populations along the river, hence it is also known as a River of disaster (Chinese: 灾难河). The management of the Yellow River has been a great political trouble to various Chinese dynasties throughout history.

When the Yellow River flows clear

Sometimes the Yellow River is poetically called the "Muddy Flow" (濁流; 浊流; Zhuó Liú). The Chinese idiom "when the Yellow River flows clear" is used to refer to an event that will never happen and is similar to the English expression "when pigs fly".

"The Yellow River running clear" was reported as a good omen during the reign of the Yongle Emperor, along with the appearance of such auspicious legendary beasts as qilin (an African giraffe brought to China by a Bengal embassy aboard Zheng He's ships in 1414) and zouyu (not positively identified) and other strange natural phenomena.

== Tourism ==
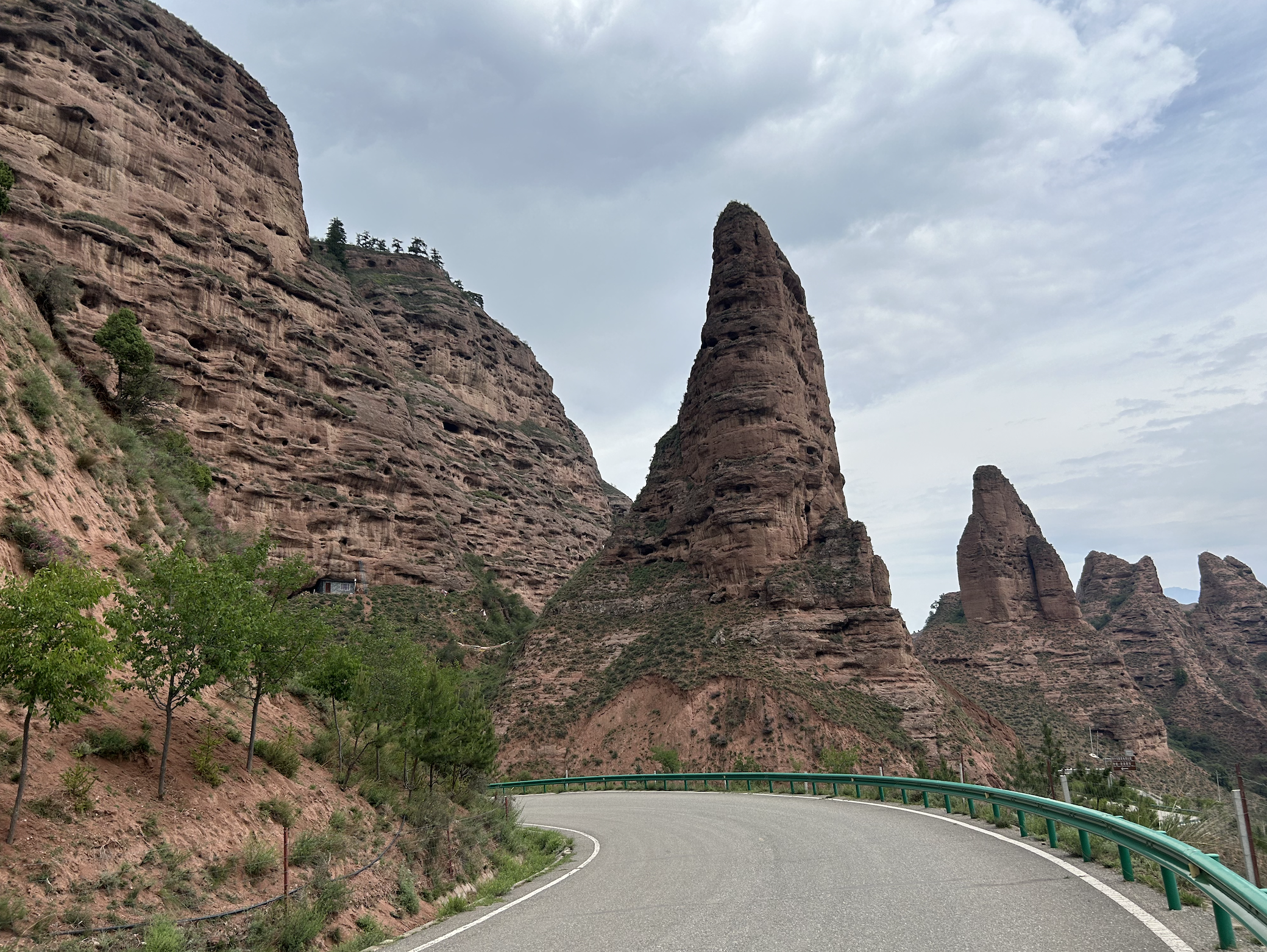
Kanbula National Geopark, Qinghai

The Yellow River has several major tourist attractions such as the Kanbula UNESCO Global Geopark in Qinghai, the Bingling Grottoes at Liujiaxia Dam and the Yellow River Stone Forest in Gansu, and the Hukou Waterfall in Shanxi.

The river was first travelled in its entirety by Chinese rafting teams in 1986. There have been successful attempts to walk and cycle the entire length of the Yellow River, although there some sections of the upper reaches the river where the bank is inaccessible.

== See also ==
- Central Plain (China)
- Geography of China
- He Bo
- List of rivers in China
- List of most-polluted rivers
- North China Plain
- North China University of Water Conservancy and Electric Power
- Water resources of China
- Yellow River Cantata
- Yellow River floods
- Yellow River management
- Yellow River Map
- Yellow River Delta National Nature Reserve
- Yellow River Piano Concerto
- Yellow Sea
- Red River (disambiguation)
