= Yellow River flood =

Yellow River flood may refer to:

- Jishi Gorge outburst flood (c. 1920 BC)
- 39 BC Yellow River flood
- 29 BC Yellow River flood
- 1034 Yellow River flood
- 1048 Yellow River flood
- 1194 Yellow River flood
- 1344 Yellow River flood
- 1375 Yellow River flood
- 1384 Yellow River flood
- 1390 Yellow River flood
- 1391 Yellow River flood
- 1416 Yellow River flood
- 1448 Yellow River flood
- 1452 Yellow River floods
- 1453 Yellow River flood
- 1494 Yellow River flood
- 1642 Yellow River flood
- 1851–1855 Yellow River floods
- 1887 Yellow River flood
- 1897 Yellow River flood
- 1931 Yellow River flood
- 1938 Yellow River flood
- 1958 Yellow River flood

== See also ==
- List of floods
- List of floods in China
