= 1642 Yellow River flood =

Man-made disaster in China

The 1642 Yellow River flood or Kaifeng flood was a man-made disaster in October, 1642, that principally affected Kaifeng and Xuzhou.

Kaifeng is located on the south bank of the Yellow River, prone to violent flooding throughout its history. During the early Ming dynasty, the town was the site of major floods in 1375, 1384, 1390, 1410, and 1416. By the mid-15th century, the Ming had completed restoration of the area's flood-control system and operated it with general success for over a century.

The 1642 flood, however, was not natural, but directed by the Ming governor of the city in the hopes of using the floodwaters to break the six-month siege the city had endured from the peasant rebels led by Li Zicheng.

The dikes were burst in an attempt to flood the rebels, but the water destroyed Kaifeng. According to another account, the rebels under Li Zicheng intended to use the river to flood the imperial forces. "Both the defenders and Li then tried using the Yellow River against each other," John W. Dardess of the University of Kansas wrote, "the defenders attempted to breach the dikes and wash away Li's army, while Li did the same to flood the city and destroy it. Li won. On October 8, 1642, Li's men cut the dikes, and a rain-swollen Yellow River burst through with a tremendous war, flooding Kaifeng..." Harry Miller of the University of South Alabama wrote that "Both sides tried to puncture the dikes on the Yellow River, in order to enlist flood as an ally. Finally, on October 7, the rain-swelled river burst through the weakened dikes in two places."

In any event, 300,000 of the 378,000 residents were killed by the flood and ensuing peripheral disasters such as famine and plague. If treated as a natural disaster, it would be one of the deadliest floods in history.

After this disaster the city was abandoned until 1662 when it was rebuilt under the rule of the Kangxi Emperor in the Qing dynasty. Archaeological research in the city has provided evidence for the 1642 flood and subsequent occupation in 1662. It remained a rural backwater city of diminished importance and experienced several other less devastating floods.

The flood also brought an end to the "golden age" of the Jewish settlement of China, said to span about 1300–1642. China's small Jewish population, estimated at around 5,000 people, was centered at Kaifeng. Furthermore, the flood destroyed the synagogue and most of the community's irreplaceable Torah.

== See also ==
- Floods in Xuzhou's history
- 1938 Yellow River flood, a similar tactic of environmental warfare
