= 1344 Yellow River flood =

Natural disaster in China

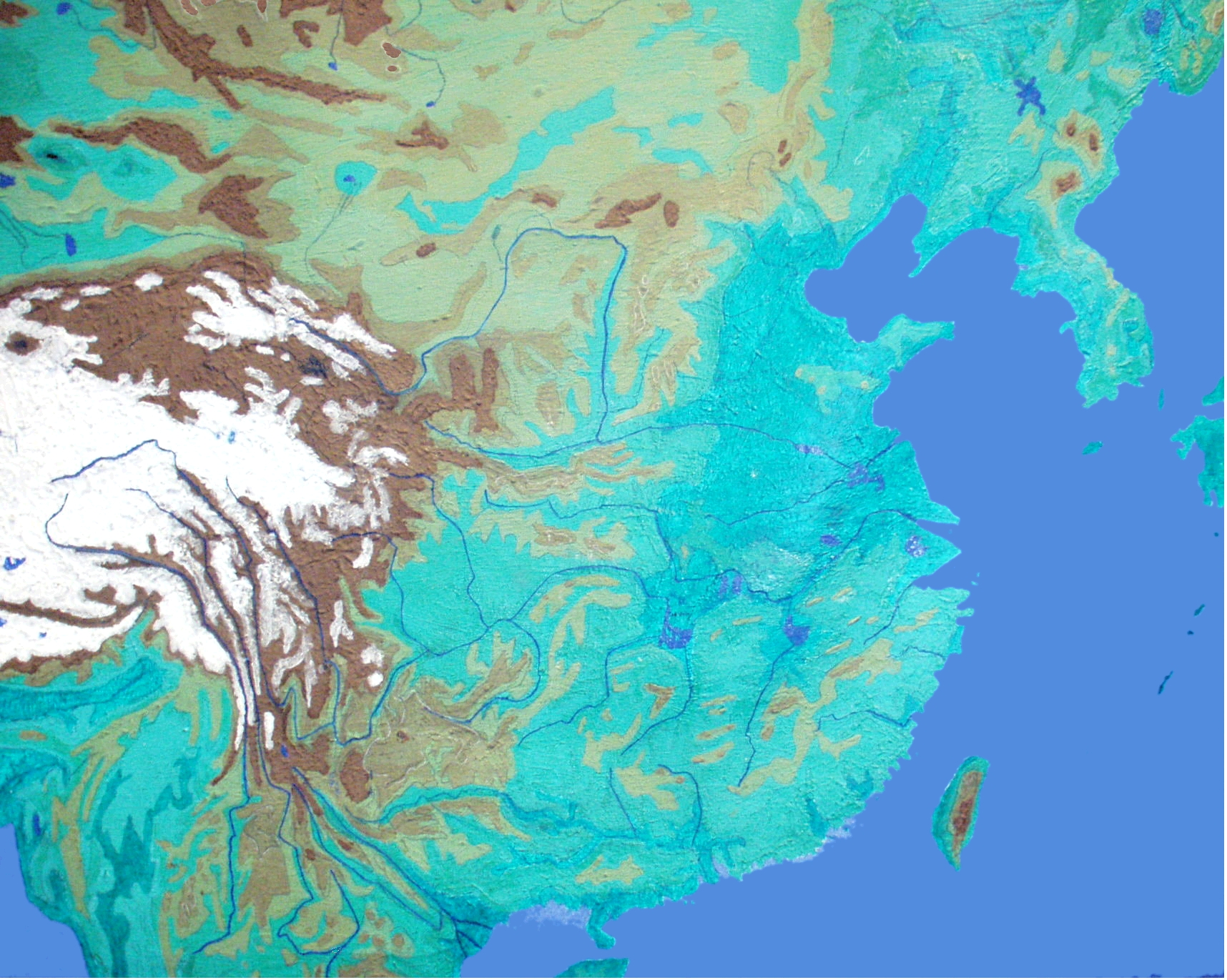
A map of China depicting the Yellow River's new path, after it stabilized following Li Xing's public works during the 1494 flood.

The 1344 Yellow River flood was a major natural disaster during the Yuan dynasty of Imperial China. The impact was devastating both for the peasants of the area as well as the leaders of the empire. The Yuan dynasty was waning, and the emperor conscripted enormous teams to build new embankments for the river. The harsh working conditions helped fuel rebellions that led to the founding of the Ming dynasty.

The Yellow River had shifted south of the Shandong Peninsula during the 1194 flood near the end of the Jin, but this flood shifted it from the course of one previous river to another's. The river remained on various courses south of Shandong for the next five hundred years until floods in the 1850s returned it to its more northerly course.

== See also ==
- Floods of the Yellow River
