= Wang Lu =

Wang Lu may refer to:

- Wang Lü (1332–1391), painter during the Yuan/Ming dynasties
- Wang Lu (composer) (born 1982), Chinese composer
- Wang Lu (footballer) (1930–2007), Chinese association footballer
- Wang Lu (beach volleyball) (born 1982), Chinese beach volleyball player
- Wang Lu, fictional character in the 1959 Indian film Neel Akasher Neechey
- Wang Lu (politician), Chinese engineer and politician

== See also ==
- Wanglu, a town in Yutai County, Shandong, China
- Lu Wang (disambiguation)
