= Dongyu River =

Location
- Country: China
- Province: Shandong

Physical characteristics
- Mouth: Zhaoyang Lake
  - coordinates: 35°00′43″N 116°45′04″E
- Length: 172.1 kilometres

Dongyu River
- Simplified Chinese: 东鱼河
- Traditional Chinese: 東魚河
- Hanyu Pinyin: Dōng yú hé

The Dongyu River (Chinese: 东鱼河), formerly known as the Hongwei River (红卫河), is a river in the Shandong Province of the People's Republic of China, is the largest artificial river in southwestern Shandong, with a length of 172.1 kilometres a basin area of 5,923 square kilometers.

Dongyu River stretches from Dongming County of Heze City in the west, reaches Yutai County of Jining City in the east, and enters Zhaoyang Lake (昭阳湖).

Dongyu River was excavated during the Cultural Revolution of the PRC, and was called the Hongwei River at that time. In October 1985, "Hongwei River" was renamed "Dongyu River".
