= Si River =

River in Shandong, China

Coordinates: 35°13′31.01″N 116°39′13.00″E

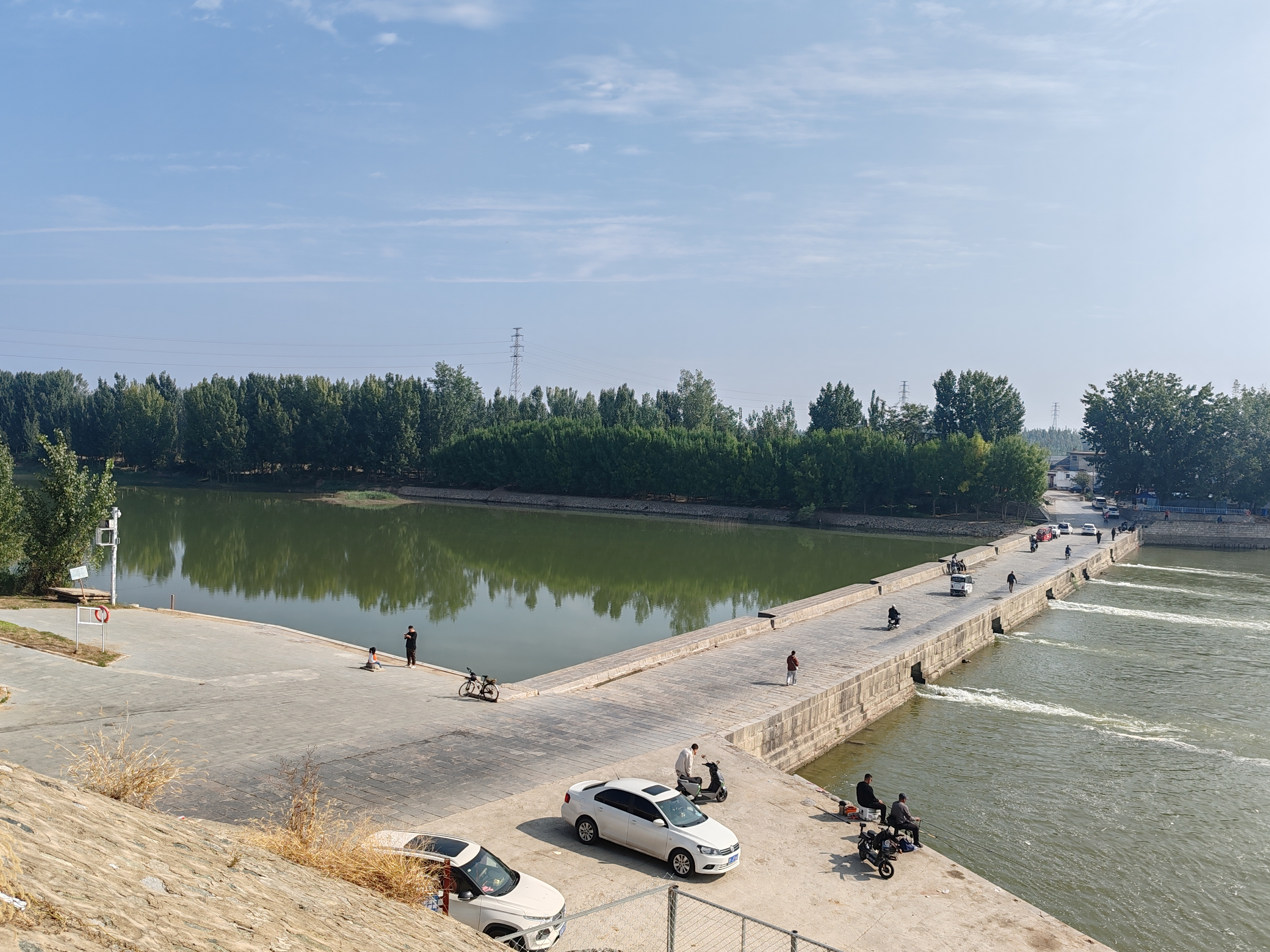
Jinkou Dam on Si River in Yanzhou, Jining

The Si River (Chinese: 泗河, pinyin: Sì Hé; formerly 泗水, pinyin: Sì Shuǐ) is a river in Shandong Province, eastern China. It also ran through the area of modern Jiangsu Province until floods changed its course in 1194.

== Course ==
The Si rises in the southern foothills of the Mengshan Mountains (蒙山), then flows through Sishui County and the cities of Qufu and Yanzhou before emptying into Lake Nanyang (南阳湖).

== History ==
In antiquity, the river was a major tributary of the Huai River in central China. Tributaries such as the Fan (反), Sui (睢), Tong (潼) and Yi (沂) swelled its banks as it passed through present-day Yutai, Pei, Xuzhou, Suqian, and Siyang counties in Shandong and Jiangsu. Its confluence with the Huai occurred at Sikou (泗口) or Qingkou (清口) at present-day Huai'an in Jiangsu.

From a very early date, the Huai was connected with the Yellow River through the Honggou Canal (t 鴻溝, s 鸿沟, Hónggōu, "Canal of the Wild Geese"). In 486 BC, King Fuchai of Wu built the Hangou Canal (t 邗溝, s 邗沟, Hángōu), connecting the Huai and Honggou to the Yangtze River to their south. Amid his ongoing wars against Qi and Jin, in 483 and 482 BC, he further expanded this network with the Heshui Canal (t 菏水運河, s 菏水运河, Héshuǐ Yùnhé), connecting the Si with the Ji River, which ran parallel to the Yellow River through densely peopled districts in what is now western Shandong.

In 1194, at the time of the Song and Jin Dynasties, the Yellow River altered its course southwards, engulfing the lower reaches of the Si River below Xuzhou City and those of the Huai River below Huai'an. As a result, the Si River no longer exists in Jiangsu Province.

During the 1851–1855 Yellow River floods, the Yellow River once more altered its course northwards, assuming the course of the former Ji River and again passing north of the Shandong Peninsula in 1852. However, due to the large amount of silt carried by the river, it left behind a 4-to-6-metre (13 to 20 ft) high layer of mud in the lower reaches of the Si River's former course.

== Legacy ==
The philosopher Confucius is buried on the north bank of the Si River where it passes through Qufu. The river was also traditionally regarded as a place where the Nine Cauldrons were lost. Its name was preserved in the imperial Si Prefecture and Subprefecture and the present-day Si County in Anhui.

== See also ==
- List of rivers in China
