= Lu Wang =

Lu Wang may refer to:

- Philosophies of Lu Jiuyuan (1139–1192) and Wang Yangming (1472–1529)
- Jiang Ziya (fl. 11th century BC), also known as Lü Wang
- Lu Wang (biostatistician), Chinese-American biostatistician

== See also ==
- Luwang, a clan of Meetei in India
- Prince of Lu (disambiguation) or Lu Wang
- Wang Lu (disambiguation) for a list of people with the surname Wang
