= Ji River =

Former river in Shandong, China

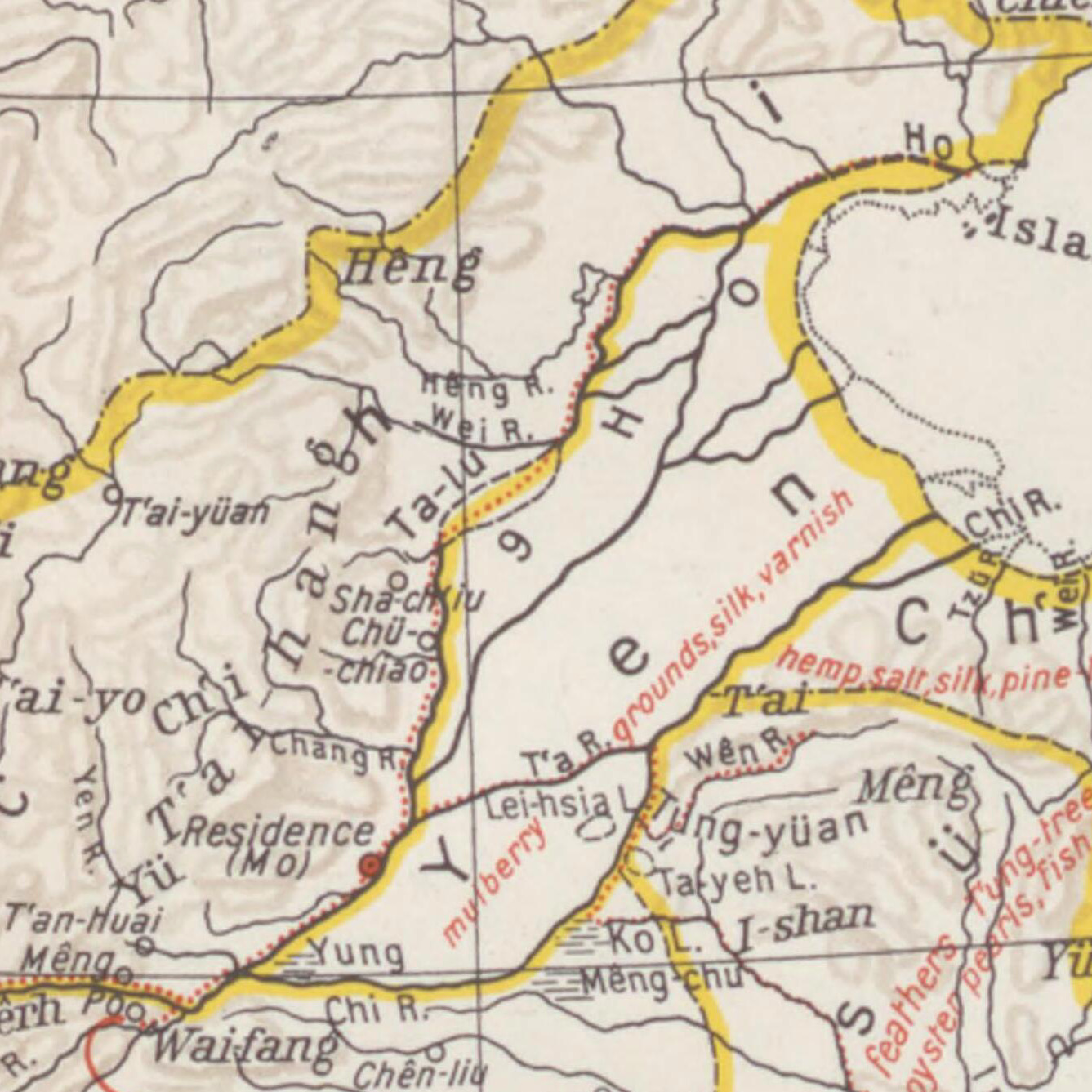
- A map of Yanzhou (labelled as "Yen"), one of the Nine Provinces of Ancient China, c. 1110 BC. Yanzhou was bounded by the Ji River ("Chi R.") to the south, the Yellow River ("Ho") to the north, and the Bohai Sea to the east (the dotted line indicates the modern coastline).
- Traditional Chinese: 濟河
- Simplified Chinese: 济河
Transcriptions
Standard Mandarin
- Hanyu Pinyin: Jǐ Hé
- Wade–Giles: Chi Ho

Alternative Chinese name
- Traditional Chinese: 濟水
- Simplified Chinese: 济水
Transcriptions
Standard Mandarin
- Hanyu Pinyin: Jǐ Shuǐ
- Wade–Giles: Chi Shui

Second alternative Chinese name
- Traditional Chinese: 濟水河
- Simplified Chinese: 济水河
Transcriptions
Standard Mandarin
- Hanyu Pinyin: Jǐshuǐ Hé
- Wade–Giles: Chi-shui Ho

Other names

Ji River
- Chinese: 泲水
Transcriptions
Standard Mandarin
- Hanyu Pinyin: Jǐ Shuǐ
- Wade–Giles: Chi Shui

Yuan River
- Chinese: 冤水
- Literal meaning: Bendy River
Transcriptions
Standard Mandarin
- Hanyu Pinyin: Yuān Shuǐ
- Wade–Giles: Yüan Shui

The Ji River was a former river in north-eastern China which gave its name to the towns of Jiyuan and Jinan. In one of the massive Yellow River floods of 1852, the Yellow River shifted its course from below the Shandong Peninsula to north of it, taking over what was then the Ji River's main channel below Dongping Lake.

== Name ==
Jǐ is the pinyin romanization of the present-day Mandarin pronunciation of the Chinese name written 濟 in traditional characters and 济 in the simplified form used in mainland China. The river's Old Chinese pronunciation has been reconstructed as /*[ts]ˤəjʔ/ or /*ʔsliːlʔ/. Ancient Chinese accounts also wrote the name with the character 泲, and Lin Chuanjia considered this to be identical with the Yuan River that gave Yuanqu County its name.

== Geography ==
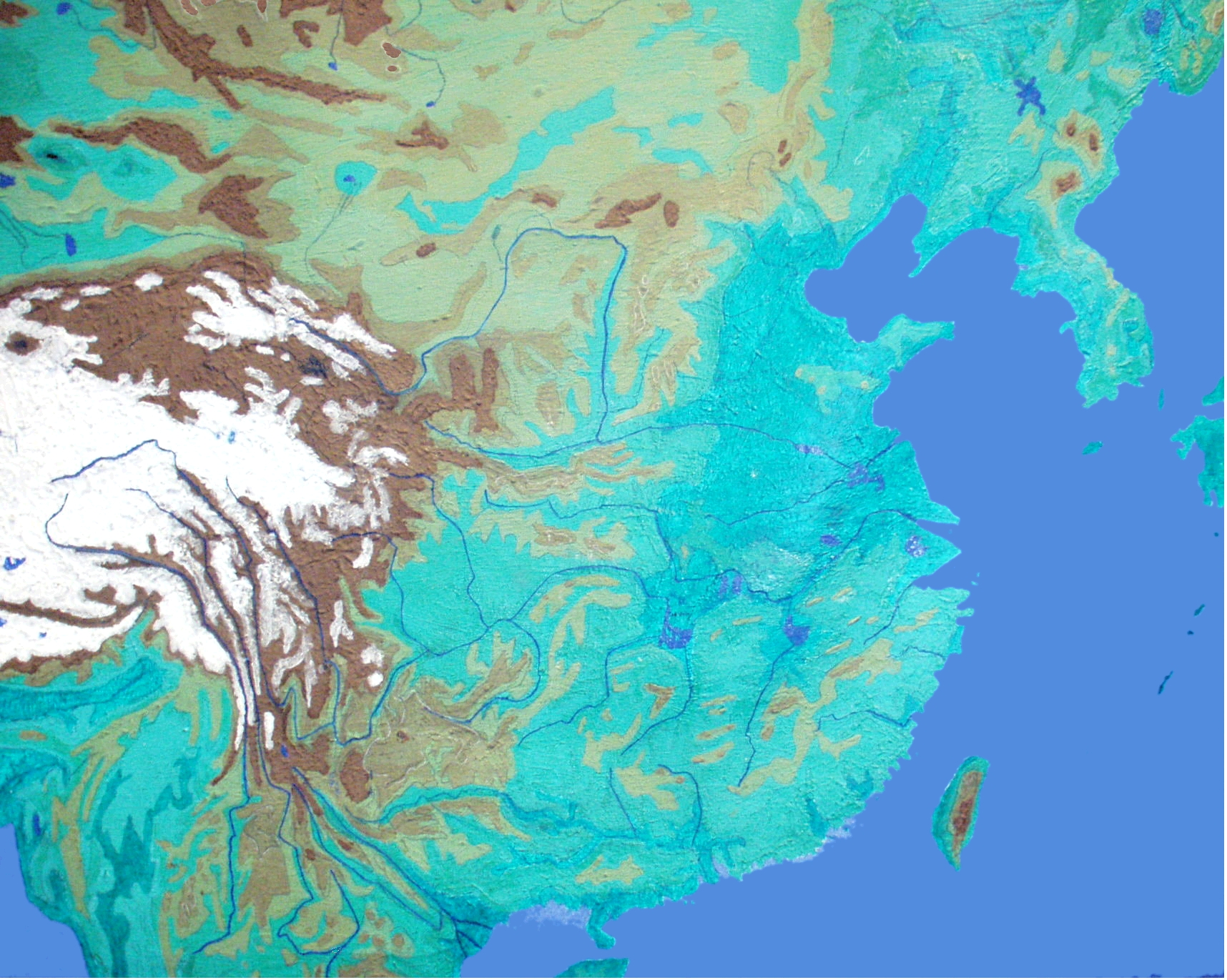
A map of China depicting the Yellow River's path between the floods of 1494 and those of the early 1850s

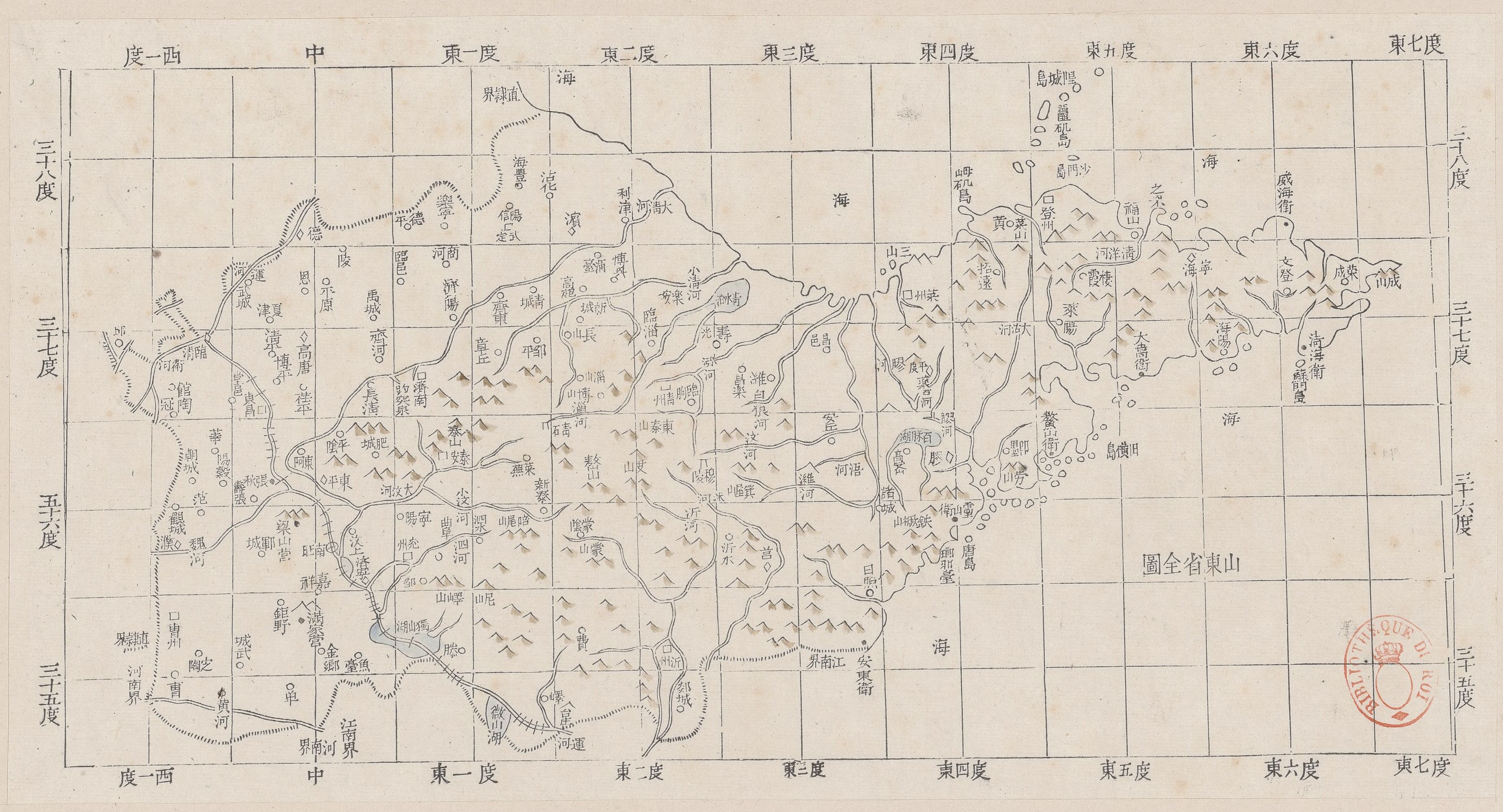
An 1808 map of Shandong depicts the Daqing and Xiaoqing Rivers. Both the Daqing and Xiaoqing channels were historically used by the Ji River. The Yellow River today follows the course of the Daqing River.
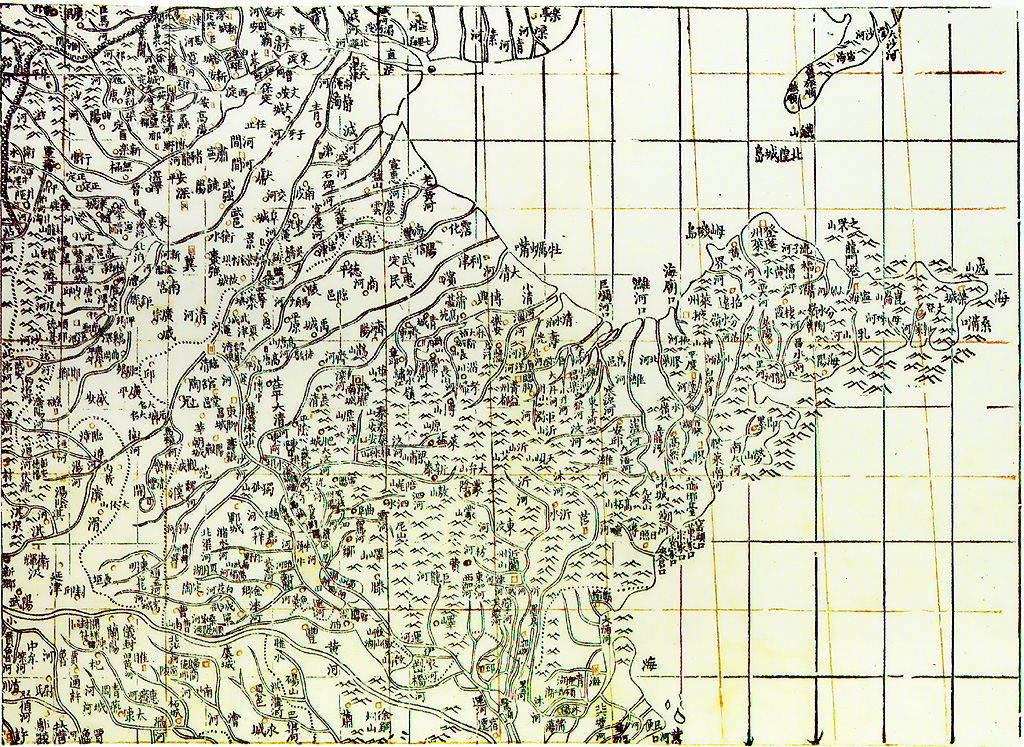
Imperial Complete Map of All under Heaven (皇朝一統輿地全圖), Li Zhaoluo, 1832, also depicting the Daqing and Xiaoqing Rivers

The Ji River changed its precise course several times over the historical period before its disappearance. Generally, it traced its course from an origin near Jiyuan in what is now Henan Province through Shandong to the Bohai Sea.

During the Neolithic, the Ji was probably a distributary of the Yellow River, merging with its lower course in the North China Plain.

At some point, its flooding shifted the lower course of the Yellow River into a separate channel, while the Ji continued to occupy its earlier path. The two rivers ran parallel to one another under the Zhou, Qin, and Han.

Under the Han, the Ji River's central course passed through Daye Marsh (t 大野澤, s 大野泽, Dàyězé) and its mouth was in Qiansheng Commandery (千乘郡, Qiānchéng Jùn).

== History ==
The area around the Ji River was among the most densely populated in China during the Neolithic Age, when its plains were a center for the Longshan and Yueshi cultures. It was honored as a god in ancient Chinese religion.

Sima Qian lists the Ji among the rivers connected by the Honggou Canal (t 鴻溝, s 鸿沟, Hónggōu, "Canal of the Wild Geese"), whose remote antiquity caused him to place it next after the works of the legendary figure Yu the Great. In fact, the Heshui Canal (t 荷水運河, s 荷水运河, Héshuǐ Yùnhé) connecting the Ji to the Si was completed by soldiers under the command of King Fuchai of Wu in 483 and 482 BC in order to improve their supply lines while at war with the northern states of Qi and Jin. From the Si, the Ji River then had access to the Huai River, which connected to the new course of the Yellow River through the Hongguo Canal and with the Yangtze River through the Hangou Canal just completed by Fuchai's men in 486 BC.

Under the Zhou, the state of Qi was centered on the broad floodplain of the Ji. It also used the "clear Ji" along with the "muddy Yellow River" as part of its borders with and defenses against the states of Yan and Zhao. During antiquity, the river was a center of salt production.

The river went dry during the Wei and Jin period (3rd–4th century AD).

The present-day Xiaoqing River roughly follows the channel of the lower Ji River as documented in the Tang-era Yuanhe Maps and Records of Prefectures and Counties.

Through the Qing dynasty, the channel of the Ji River below Dongping Lake remained fed by its longtime tributary the Dawen River, and was known as the Daqing River. During one of the massive Yellow River floods of 1852, the Yellow River shifted its course from below the Shandong Peninsula to north of it. In the process, it assumed the course of the Daqing River.

== Legacy ==
The Ji River was the namesake of Jiyuan ("Source of the Ji") and Jinan ("South of the Ji").
