= Shanghu =

Shanghu (Note: Chinese: s 商胡, p Shānghú.) is a former city of China.

A burst fascine there shifted the course of the Yellow River north towards modern Tianjin in 1048. The damage occasioned by the 1034 flood had not yet been repaired, and the new flood was even worse, reducing the income of the rich northern provinces to one-fifth their pre-1034 level.

== See also ==
- 1048 Yellow River flood
