= Nansi Lake =

Lake in Shandong, China

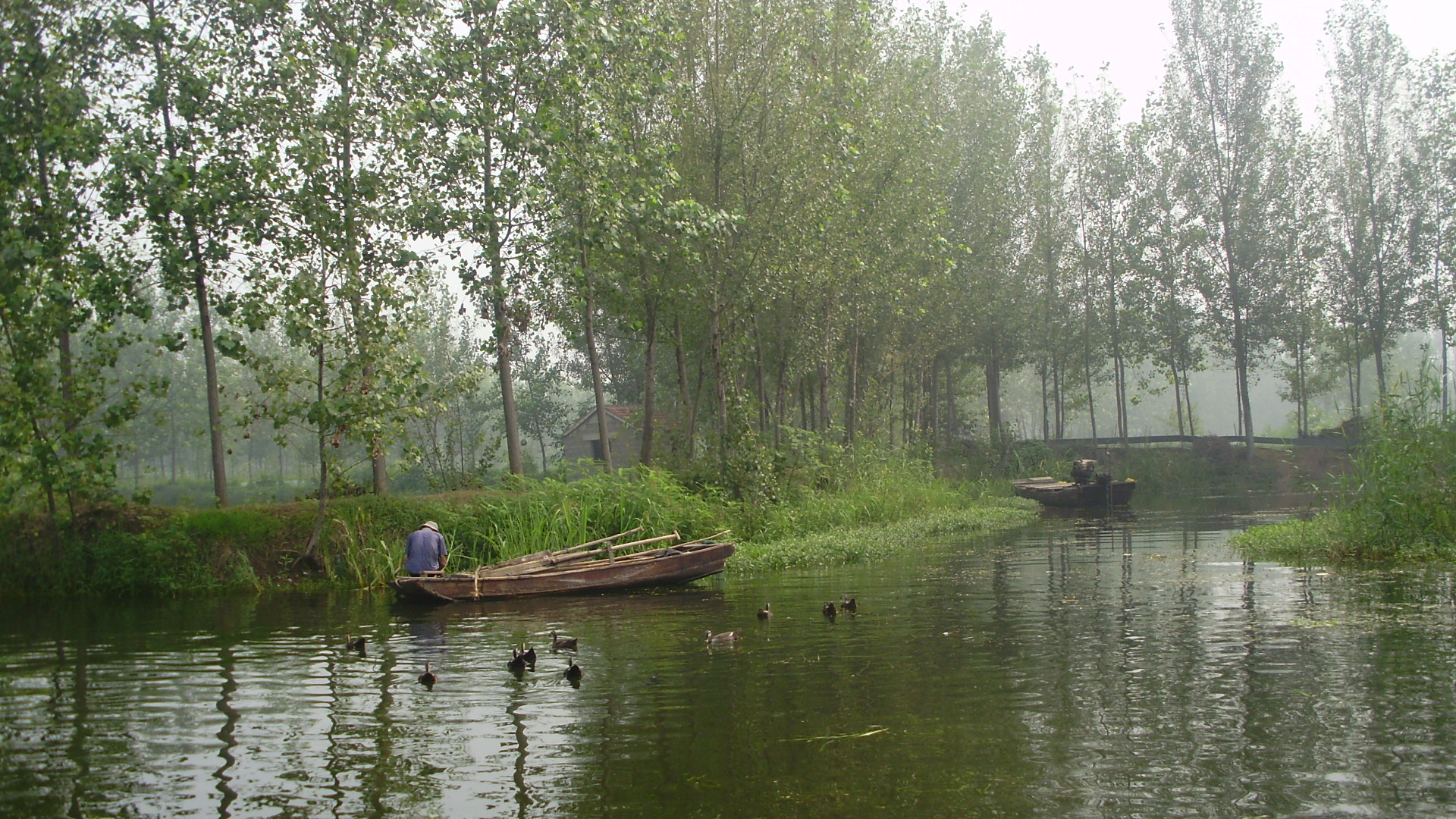
- A corner of Weishan Lake, China

- Location within Shandong
- Location: Jining and Zaozhuang, Shandong, China
- Coordinates: 34°36′N 117°12′E
- Basin countries: China

Ramsar Wetland
- Official name: Shandong Jining Nansi Lake
- Designated: 8 January 2018
- Reference no.: 2346

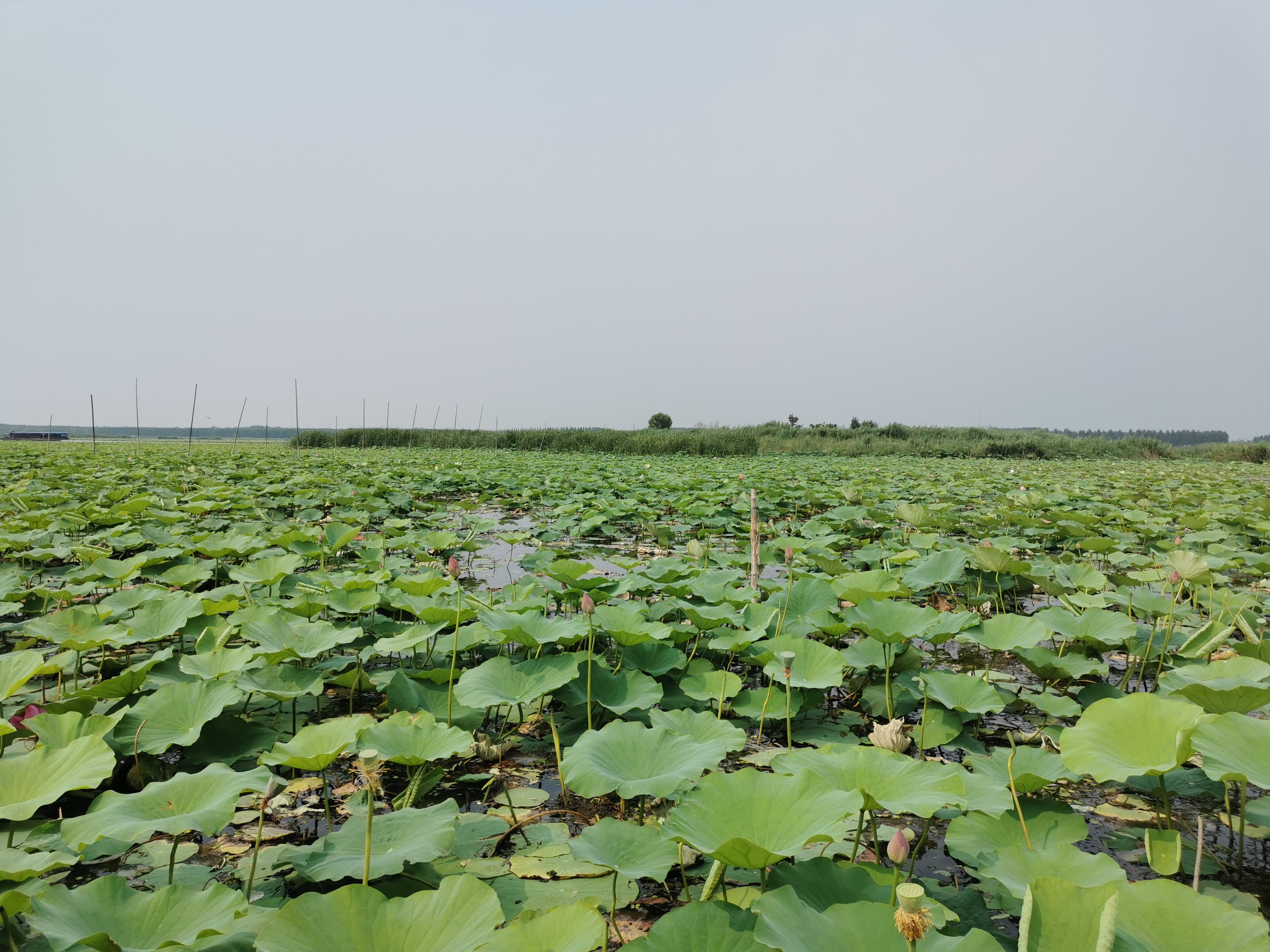
Weishan Lake

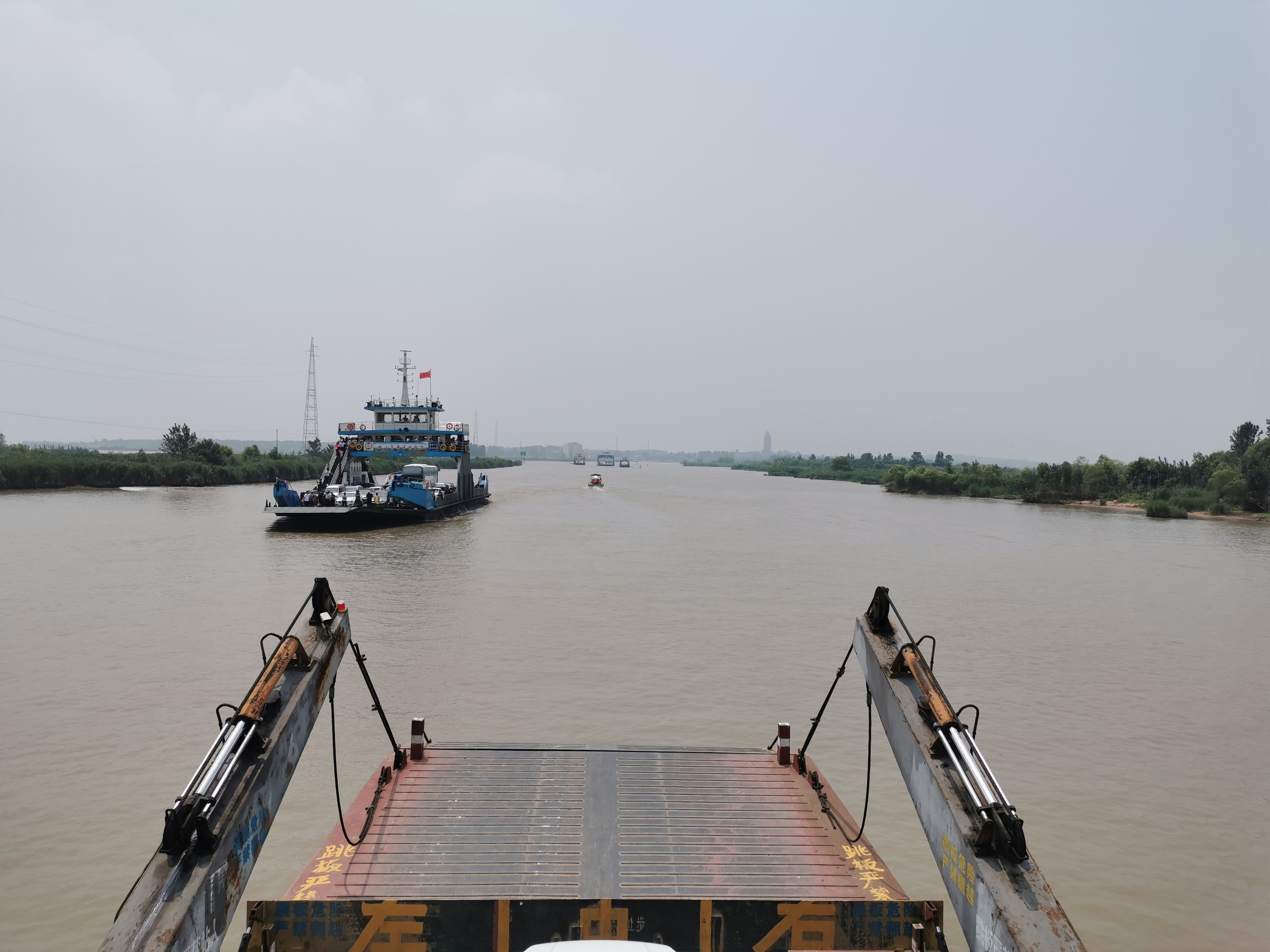
Ferries in Weishan Lake

Nansi Lake (Chinese: 南四湖; pinyin: Nánsì Hú; lit. 'Southern Four Lakes'), or Weishan Lake, administrated by Weishan County and located in Shandong Province in China, is the largest freshwater lake in the north of the country. It consists of four connected lakes: Weishan (Chinese: 微山湖; pinyin: Wēishān Hú), Zhaoyang (Chinese: 昭阳湖; pinyin: Zhāoyáng Hú), Nanyang (Chinese: 南阳湖; pinyin: Nányáng Hú), Dushan (Chinese: 独山湖; pinyin: Dúshān Hú). It is 120 km long and 1266 square km in area.

== History ==
=== Early records: Zhaoyang Lake alone ===
The first of the four lakes to appear in contemporary sources is Zhaoyang Lake, which Zou Yilin identifies with the Yuan-era Shanyang Lake (山阳湖) or Diaoyang Lake (刁阳湖). It was one of four major reservoirs dredged by the early Ming, and it was described as being 80 li long, and lying between Teng County (now Tengzhou county-level city) in the north and Pei County in the south. It was apparently located on the east side of the canal, and on higher ground than the canal itself, making it ideal as a natural reservoir. Sluices were built at the lake mouths in 1410 and rebuilt in 1494. In 1528, a major flood of the Yellow River overflowed into Zhaoyang Lake, filling it with sediment and damaging the sluice gate at the mouth so that less water came in to replenish the lake. The lake shrank in size, and the dried-up area was converted into farmland. The Jiajing Pei County Annals (嘉靖 沛县志) described it during this period as only 10 li long; it said the lake's beauty was comparable to that of Little West Lake and that it was considered one of the "eight scenic spots" of Pei County. In 1542, a new embankment was built at the behest of Wang Yiqi, the deputy minister of war, in order to restore water flow. It apparently worked, but another major Yellow River flood swamped Zhaoyang Lake in July 1565. According to Han Zhaoqing, silting from this flood is probably what caused Zhaoyang Lake to be divided in two, into what were later referred to as "Big" and "Little" Zhaoyang Lake.

=== 1560s: shift in canal course and the formation of Dushan and Weishan lakes ===
The situation changed in May 1567, when construction finished on a new section of the Grand Canal, which was diverted 15 km to the east of its former course. With the completion of this new section (the "Nanyang New Canal"), Zhaoyang Lake was left on the west side of the canal, and its water source now became solely the smaller streams coming from the west, such as the Honggou. It was also used as a retention basin to contain Yellow River floodwaters.

Meanwhile, Dushan Lake appears to have come into existence at the same time as the 1567 canal shift. It was apparently dug as an artificial reservoir to help control stormwater runoff from the Shandong hills to the east, much as Zhaoyang Lake had done for the old course of the canal. It was also used to store water for canal transportation. Confusingly, contemporary sources also refer to Dushan Lake as Nanyang Lake, after the nearby town of Nanyang (20 km northeast of present-day Yutai County), although according to Han Zhaoqing, the contemporary descriptions of this lake's location match today's Dushan Lake rather than today's Nanyang Lake. Moreover, several contemporary sources also identify Dushan and Nanyang as alternate names for the same lake, with Dushan coming from the nearby Dushan hills. The first definite mention of today's Nanyang Lake is in 1746, when it and Dushan Lake are mentioned as separate lakes.

Meanwhile, several new lakes were also formed in the 1560s as a consequence of the new canal construction: Weishan, Chishan (赤山), and Lümeng (吕孟). Originally, Lümeng Lake appears to have been the most prominent. The first mention of the four lakes as they exist today (Nanyang, Zhaoyang, Dushan, and Weishan) is in 1746. The merging of Weishan, Chishan, and Lümeng into one lake had probably taken place by this point. It had certainly taken place by the reign of the Jiaqing Emperor (1796-1820), since the Jiaqing Yitongzhi described the three as "actually one lake... now generally called Lümeng". The name "Weishan Lake" was after Weishan Island, which was located in the lake.

=== Late 1600s to late 1800s: progressive merging of the four lakes ===
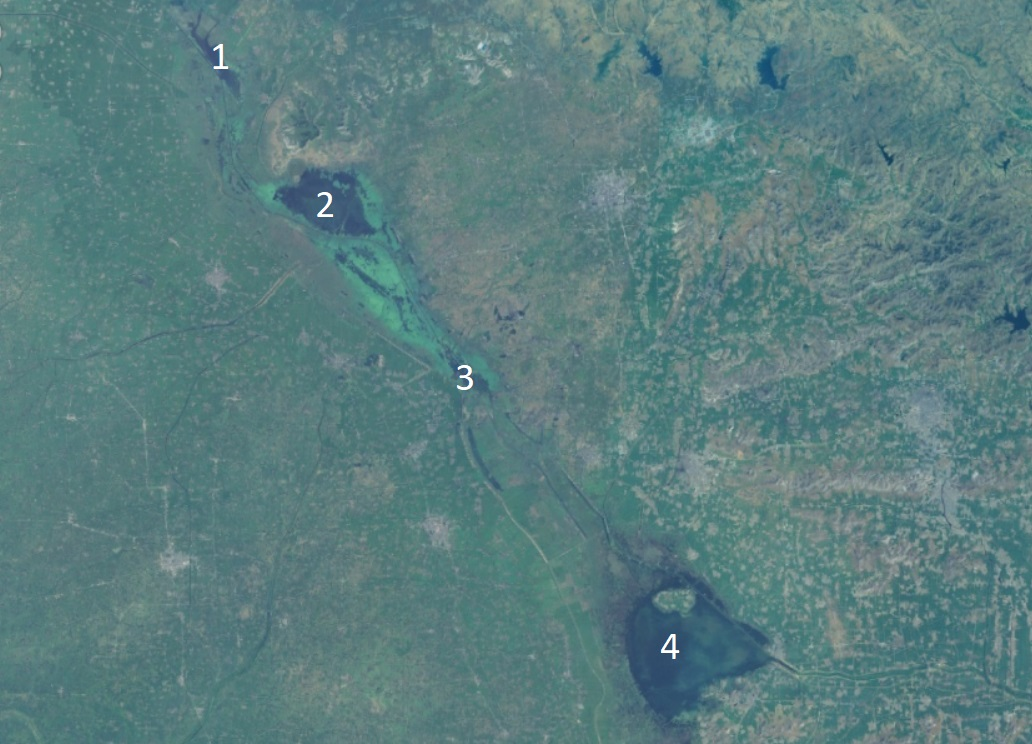
Satellite image of Nansi Lake's four constituent lakes: Nanyang (1), Dushan (2), Zhaoyang (3), and Weishan (4)

By the late 1600s, a united Lake Weishan-Zhaoyang-Nanyang had formed, and it gradually expanded northward over the course of the next century. Between 1684 and 1755, its northern boundary had shifted 3 km to the north.

By the late 1700s, Zhaoyang Lake had silted up considerably and often dried up altogether during periods of low rainfall. Along with Nanyang and Dushan Lakes, it served to convey slope water downstream to Weishan Lake.

Prolonged drought in 1810-14 caused the lakes to dry up, prompting regular monthly water level measurements to begin in 1814. The 1851–1855 Yellow River floods caused a major northward expansion of the united Lake Weishan-Zhaoyang-Nanyang. Another period of repeated flooding, in 1871-73, caused the united lake to merge with Dushan Lake, thus forming today's Nansi Lake.

Prior to the merging of Nansi Lake, the area was swampy, with relatively shallow and slow-moving water. Its plant life was dominated by emergent plants, with floating-leaved and rootless submerged plants also common. These plants all prefer stagnant or slow-moving water. After the merging of the lakes, water levels rose, and swampy areas gave way to a pelagic ecosystem dominated by rooted submerged plants, while emergent and floating-leaved plants were relegated to the edges of the lake.

=== Modern times: conflict over water resources ===
Since 1805, there have been 53 violent disputes over Nansi Lake's water resources. Of these, 12 happened between 1805 and 1953; these largely involved local "lake regiments", which were local militias formed by farmers reclaiming shoal land in various parts of the lake. In 1953, Weishan County was formed, and at the same time, an agreement between Jiangsu and Shandong Provinces was signed, defining shoal land as the provincial boundary. However, the rising and falling of the lake's water level meant that the "shoal land" was constantly fluctuating, resulting in ambiguous boundaries and property rights and causing frequent conflict. Between 1953 and 1980, there were 19 violent disputes (mostly between people from Pei County and people from Weishan County), during which 31 people were killed. Most of this happened during the so-called Dianzi Incident in 1973, when 30 people were killed and 57 were injured. A resolution was reached in 1980, when the official boundary was redrawn to be right down the middle of the lake. However, conflict has continued; in addition to land rights, there has also been dispute over water resources, since opening the dam on the lake during the rainy season to let off excess water could cause flooding downstream, while keeping the dam closed during the dry season could cause crop failure downstream.

Until the mid-1980s, Nansi Lake's water quality was generally within drinking standards; however, since the late 1980s, widespread dumping of untreated industrial and agricultural sewage into the lake's drainage basin caused a deterioration in water quality.

== Description ==
Nansi Lake is the largest freshwater lake in northern China, with a surface area of 1266 km^{2}. The lake's average water depth is 1.46 m, while its maximum depth is 2.76 m. Its drainage basin covers an area of 30,453 km^{2}; all the streams in this area flow radially toward the lake. In general, the surrounding terrain is higher in the north and lower in the south, and there are hills to the east while there are plains to the west.

A dam was constructed on the lake in 1960, dividing it into upper and lower parts. Nanyang, Dushan, and most of Zhaoyang Lake comprise the lake's upper part, while Weishan Lake and a small part of Zhaoyang Lake make up the lower part. The upper and lower parts of Nansi Lake have similar surface area (602 km^{2} for the upper and 664 km^{2} for the lower lake), but almost 90% of the drainage basin flows to the upper part. A total of 53 streams flow into Nansi Lake (29 into the upper part, and 24 into the lower part).

Historically, the lake has frequently flooded, but since the 1980s, water diversion upstream and high water consumption have resulted in drought being more common.

=== Weishan Lake ===
The largest of the four lakes is Weishan Lake, the southernmost, with an approximate area of 660 km^{2}. It has an average water depth of about 2.5 m. Compared to the other three lakes, Weishan also has the highest water quality. About 89.9% of its surface is covered by aquatic macrophyte plants, primarily Potamogeton lucens, Myriophillum spicatum, and Potamogeton crispus. Its alkalinity is relatively neutral, with a pH of about 8.627. Its dissolved oxygen content is about 9.351 mg/L, and its water hardness is about 60.05 mg_{CaO}/L.

== Human use ==
Nansi Lake is one of the most important freshwater fisheries in Shandong Province. It also plays a key role as a water reservoir for the eastern route of the South-North Water Diversion Project.
