= Nanchenjiazhuang =

Village in Shandong, China

Nanchenjiazhuang (simplified Chinese: 南陈家庄; traditional Chinese: 南陳家莊) is a small village in Sishui County, in the Chinese province of Shandong. It has a population of about 2,000.

The county seat is north of Nanchenjiazhuang.

Nanchenjiazhuang is an important production base of pesticide- and fertilizer-free cereals and vegetables.

This village, though small, has a cultural history dating back more than 3000 years. A Han dynasty tomb, roughly two millennia old, was excavated in 1984, at the foot of the sacred Zhaoyang Hill. To the west of the village is the mausoleum of a Song dynasty princess.
