= Henglong (former city) =

Former city in northern China

Henglong (traditional Chinese: 橫隴; simplified Chinese: 横陇; pinyin: Hénglǒng is a former city in northern China.

A burst fascine there in 1034 diverted the Yellow River north into three separate courses east of Daming, one terminating in the Chi River, another in the You, the last in the Jin. The flood was recorded as reducing the revenues of the northern provinces by half, damage that had not been repaired before the even larger flood and course change in 1048.

== See also ==
- 1034 Yellow River flood
