= Weishan County, Shandong =

Weishan County 微山县
- County
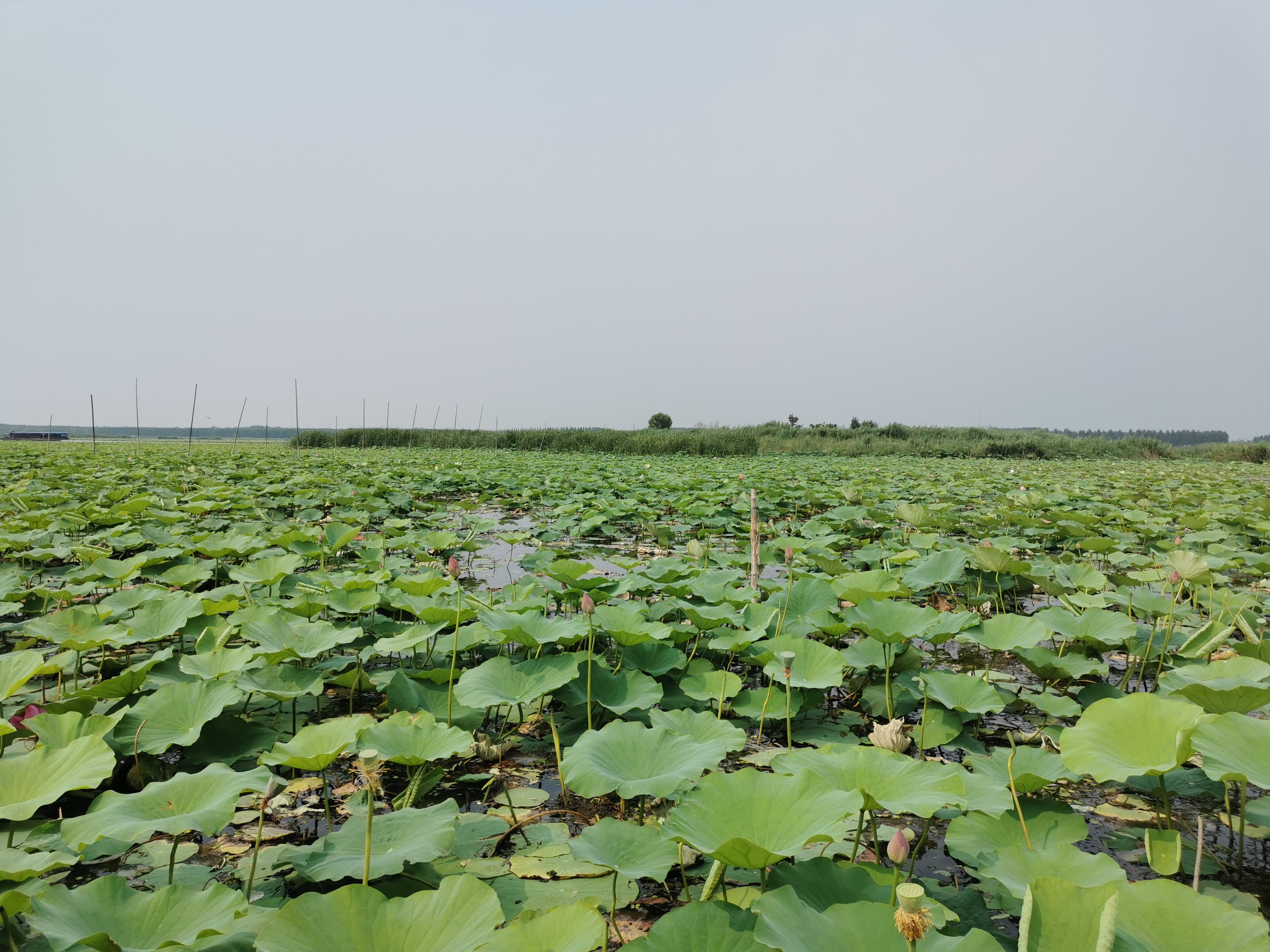
- Weishan Lake, which occupies the majority of the county.

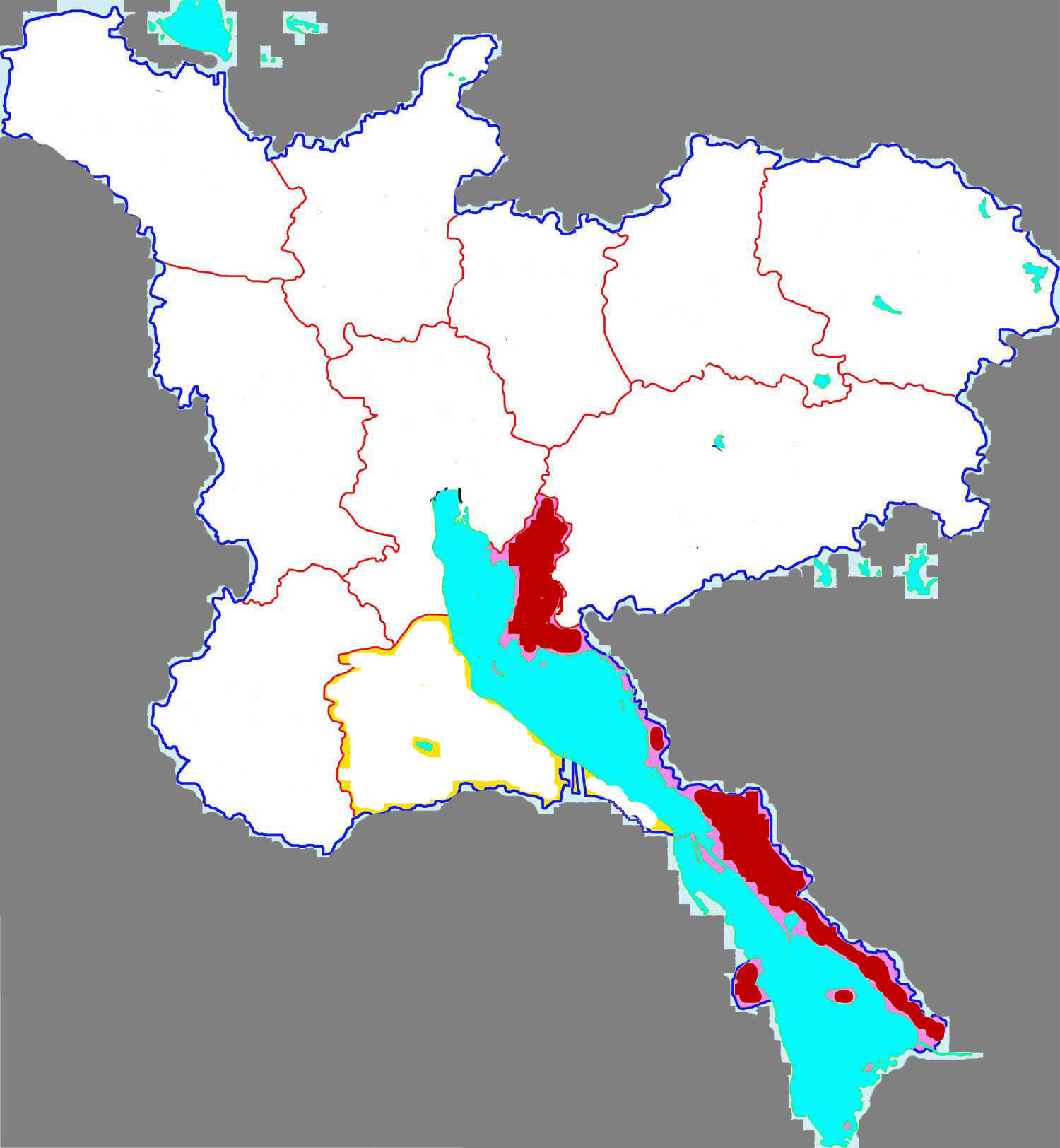
- Location in Jining

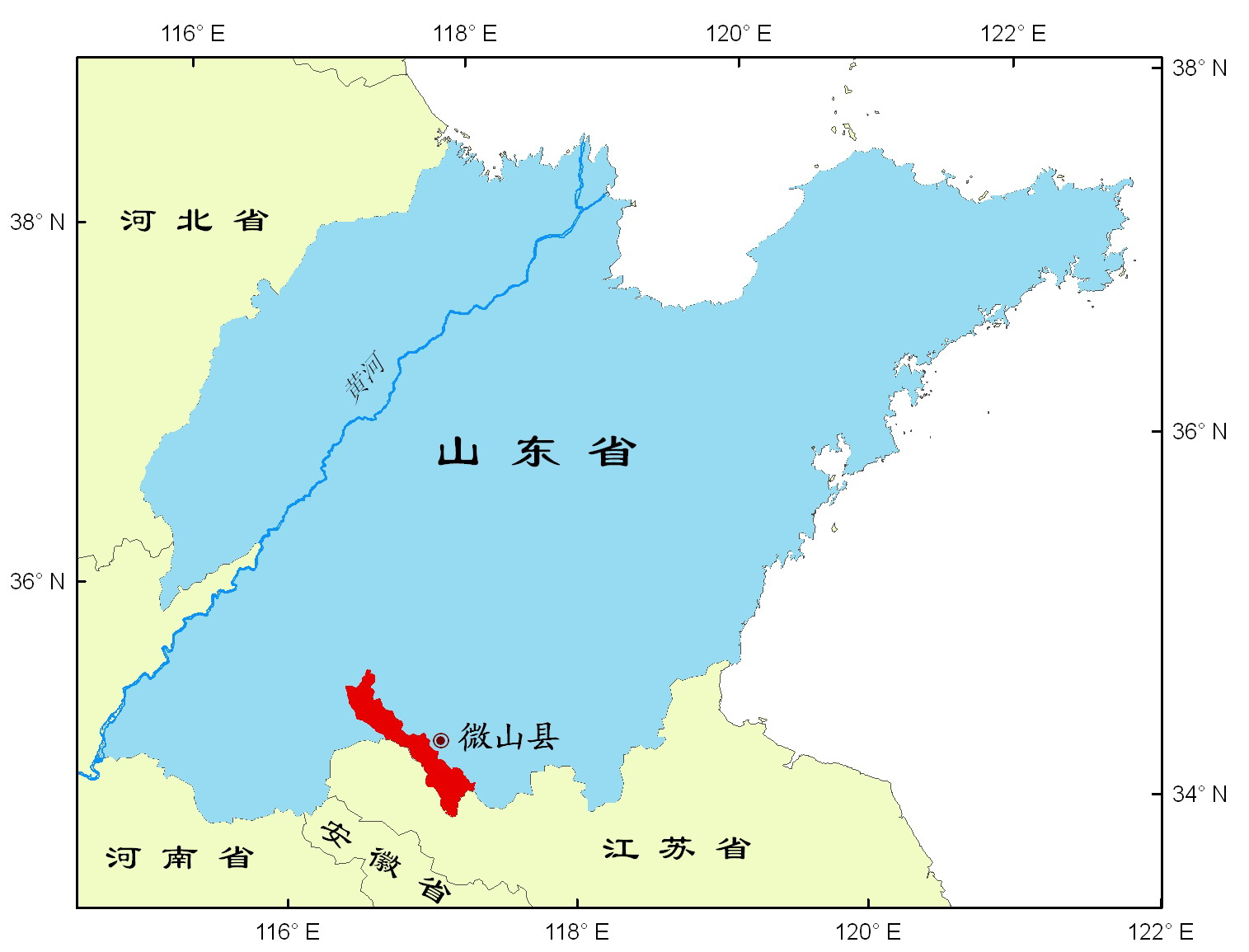
- Location of the seat relative to Weishan Lake and in Shandong
- Coordinates: 34°48′N 117°08′E
- Country: People's Republic of China
- Province: Shandong
- Prefecture-level city: Jining

Area
  - Total: 1,780 km^{2} (690 sq mi)
- Elevation: 46 m (151 ft)

Population (2019)
  - Total: 736,729
  - Density: 414/km^{2} (1,070/sq mi)
- Time zone: UTC+8 (China Standard)
- Postal code: 277600
- Area code: 0537
- Website: www.weishan.gov.cn

Weishan County (simplified Chinese: 微山县; traditional Chinese: 微山縣; pinyin: Wēishān Xiàn) is a county of southwestern Shandong province, People's Republic of China, bordering Jiangsu province to the south. It is under the administration of Jining City, and much of its area is occupied by Nansi, or Weishan Lake.

== History ==
The formation of the county was quite recent, in December 1949, the Communist Party authorities of the Central and Southern Shandong established the Lakes Region Office to manage the four southern lakes (or Nansi Lake)—Weishan, Dushan, Zhaoyang, and Nanyang—and adjacent villages, under the jurisdiction of the Taizao District. The office was abolished in May 1950 and its territory redistributed among nearby counties. It was reestablished in June 1952 under Teng County, but permanently dissolved in 1953 with the creation of Weishan County under Jining Prefecture. Over the following decades, Weishan County underwent multiple administrative boundary adjustments, absorbing territories from neighboring counties in Shandong and Jiangsu provinces, including villages from Jiaxiang, Yutai, Xuecheng, Yi, and Pei County. Notably, large-scale reassignments occurred in 1956, 1957, 1958, 1960, 1983, and 1984. Since 1983, following the dissolution of Jining Prefecture, Weishan County has been administered under the prefecture-level city of Jining.

== Geography ==
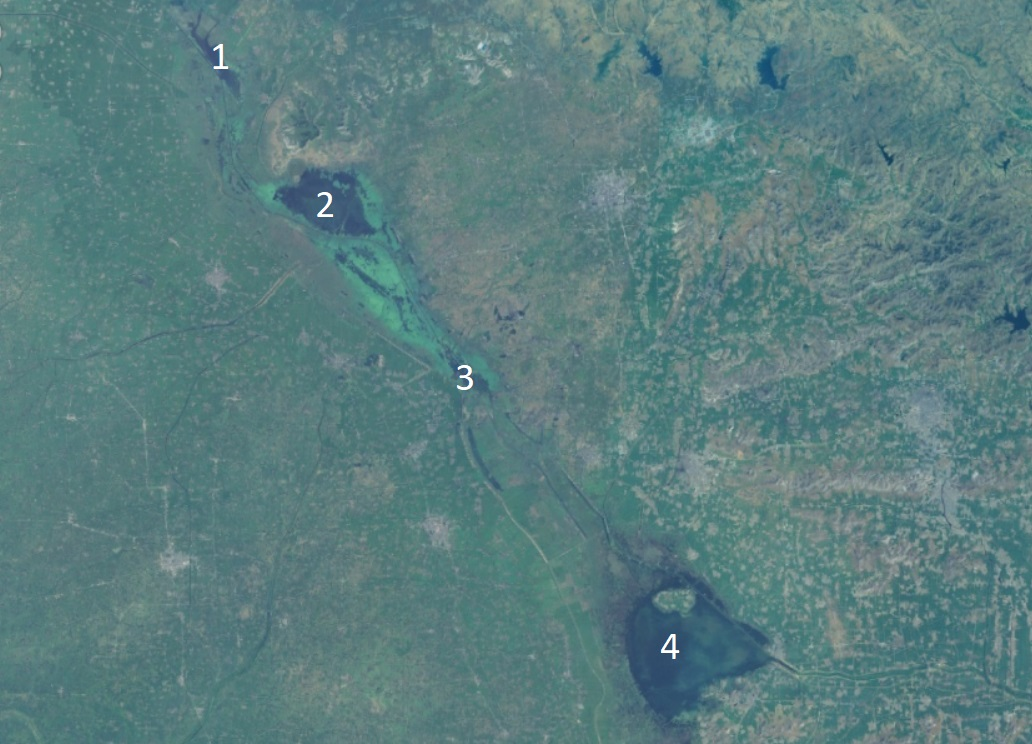
Nansi (lit. Four Southern) Lake

Weishan County is located in the warm temperate zone with four distinct seasons, and its climate is primarily influenced by monsoon conditions. The annual average temperature is 14.3 °C in the Weishan Lake area and 13.8 °C on land. The county has an average frost-free period of 208 days per year and an average annual precipitation of 684 mm. There are 335 days per year with good air quality. The county holds 3.6 billion cubic meters of freshwater resources, accounting for 45% of Shandong Province's total.

Weishan is rich in natural resources. It has 12.7 billion tons of proven coal reserves, mostly shallowly buried with thick seams, consisting largely of high-quality gas and coking coal, making Weishan one of China's key coal production bases. The county also has 12.75 million tons of proven rare earth reserves, located in Xishan, characterized by low levels of impurities such as phosphorus and iron, high grade, and simple smelting processes. It is the only known source in China of typical bastnäsite–cerium resources, making Weishan the country’s second-largest rare earth production base. In addition, there are abundant reserves of limestone, coal gangue, and yellow sand.

Weishan Lake is highly fertile and rich in biological resources, classified as a eutrophic lake. It ranks first among large lakes of its kind in China in terms of biological productivity. The lake hosts 78 species of fish and aquatic animals, including the notable "four-nostril carp," Chinese softshell turtle (Pelodiscus sinensis), Chinese mitten crab (Eriocheir sinensis), Chinese mystery snail (Cipangopaludina chinensis), Neocaridina sinensis, and Macrobrachium nipponense. There are 103 species of economically valuable aquatic plants such as reeds, wild rice stems, lotus roots, foxnuts, and gorgon fruit; 205 species of waterfowl and birds including wild ducks, moorhens, and swans, with the "Weishan domestic duck" being particularly well known; and 364 species of planktonic flora and fauna.

In terms of transportation, Weishan is traversed by the Beijing–Shanghai Railway, the Beijing-Fuzhou Expressway, National Highway 104, and the Grand Canal (a Class III inland waterway).

== Administrative divisions ==
As of 2012, this county is divided to 2 subdistricts, 6 towns and 7 townships.

Subdistricts

- Xiazhen Subdistrict (夏镇街道)
- Zhaoyang Subdistrict (昭阳街道)

Towns

- Hanzhuang, Hebei (韩庄镇)
- Huancheng (欢城镇)
- Nanyang (南阳镇)
- Luqiao (鲁桥镇)
- Fucun (傅村镇)
- Liuzhuang (留庄镇)

Townships

- Weishandao Township (微山岛乡)
- Liangcheng Township (两城乡)
- Mapo Township (马坡乡)
- Gaolou Township (高楼乡)
- Zhanglou Township (张楼乡)
- Zhaomiao Township (赵庙乡)
- Xiping Township (西平乡)

== Climate ==
Climate data for Weishan, elevation 36 m (118 ft), (1991–2020 normals, extremes 1981–present)
Month	Jan	Feb	Mar	Apr	May	Jun	Jul	Aug	Sep	Oct	Nov	Dec	Year
Record high °C (°F)	15.9 (60.6)	24.2 (75.6)	31.4 (88.5)	33.0 (91.4)	37.5 (99.5)	38.6 (101.5)	40.6 (105.1)	37.3 (99.1)	35.5 (95.9)	34.4 (93.9)	26.2 (79.2)	20.9 (69.6)	40.6 (105.1)
Mean daily maximum °C (°F)	5.4 (41.7)	8.9 (48.0)	14.6 (58.3)	21.3 (70.3)	26.6 (79.9)	31.0 (87.8)	32.0 (89.6)	31.0 (87.8)	27.3 (81.1)	21.9 (71.4)	14.1 (57.4)	7.3 (45.1)	20.1 (68.2)
Daily mean °C (°F)	0.7 (33.3)	3.7 (38.7)	9.2 (48.6)	15.7 (60.3)	21.2 (70.2)	25.7 (78.3)	27.7 (81.9)	26.7 (80.1)	22.5 (72.5)	16.6 (61.9)	9.0 (48.2)	2.7 (36.9)	15.1 (59.2)
Mean daily minimum °C (°F)	−3.0 (26.6)	−0.4 (31.3)	4.5 (40.1)	10.6 (51.1)	16.0 (60.8)	21.0 (69.8)	24.2 (75.6)	23.4 (74.1)	18.5 (65.3)	12.2 (54.0)	5.1 (41.2)	−0.8 (30.6)	10.9 (51.7)
Record low °C (°F)	−16.1 (3.0)	−19.0 (−2.2)	−12.6 (9.3)	−3.6 (25.5)	2.2 (36.0)	10.5 (50.9)	16.5 (61.7)	12.8 (55.0)	5.5 (41.9)	−3.0 (26.6)	−10.1 (13.8)	−16.0 (3.2)	−19.0 (−2.2)
Average precipitation mm (inches)	12.5 (0.49)	18.4 (0.72)	23.4 (0.92)	37.4 (1.47)	64.6 (2.54)	85.1 (3.35)	211.5 (8.33)	193.5 (7.62)	68.3 (2.69)	33.0 (1.30)	32.6 (1.28)	14.7 (0.58)	795 (31.29)
Average precipitation days (≥ 0.1 mm)	3.9	4.5	5.2	6.0	7.0	7.1	12.3	11.4	7.0	5.5	5.3	3.9	79.1
Average snowy days	2.7	2.3	0.6	0	0	0	0	0	0	0	0.5	1.3	7.4
Average relative humidity (%)	63	60	58	61	65	65	78	79	73	67	68	65	67
Mean monthly sunshine hours	138.0	144.2	189.0	214.8	229.2	205.0	186.9	186.7	177.4	177.0	152.2	142.1	2,142.5
Percentage possible sunshine	44	46	51	55	53	47	43	45	48	51	50	47	48
Source: China Meteorological Administration

== Notable people ==
- Liu Biao (151-208), military general, politician, and warlord who lived in the late Eastern Han dynasty of China.
- Qi Jiguang (1528-1588), military general and writer of the Ming dynasty.
- Zhang Zhongxian (1926-2022), lieutenant general (zhongjiang) of the People's Liberation Army.
