= 1048 Yellow River flood =

Natural disaster in China (1048 - 1194)

- Date: 1048 - 1198
- Cause: Failure of a fascine at Shanghu
- Deaths: Approximately a million people

The 1048 Yellow River flood was a natural disaster along the Yellow River in China that was caused by the failure of a fascine in Shanghu in 1048 AD. It caused over a million people to be killed and many displaced, and was a major cause of the Song dynasty's eventual decline in power.

== Background ==
After five years of failed efforts to restore the river to its previous course following the 1034 flood, the dynasty attempted to change their strategy and adjust their flood control efforts along the river's new paths in 1041.

== Damage ==
The new path was not complete when the flood went and shifted the river's main course sharply, overtaking the Hai River and further damaging the empire's northern provinces. Their revenues were reduced to about one-fifth their pre-1034 level. This course lasted until 1194 when another flood shifted the river's course to the far south, which would last for several centuries. During this century and a half, the coast around modern Tianjin moved forward about 23 kilometers.

== See also ==
- Floods of the Yellow River
- 1034 Yellow River flood
