= 1897 Yellow River flood =

Natural disaster in China

The 1897 Yellow River flood was a major natural disaster during the late Qing dynasty in China. In that year, 50,000 square miles of the river's floodplain where inundated and more than a million people were drowned.

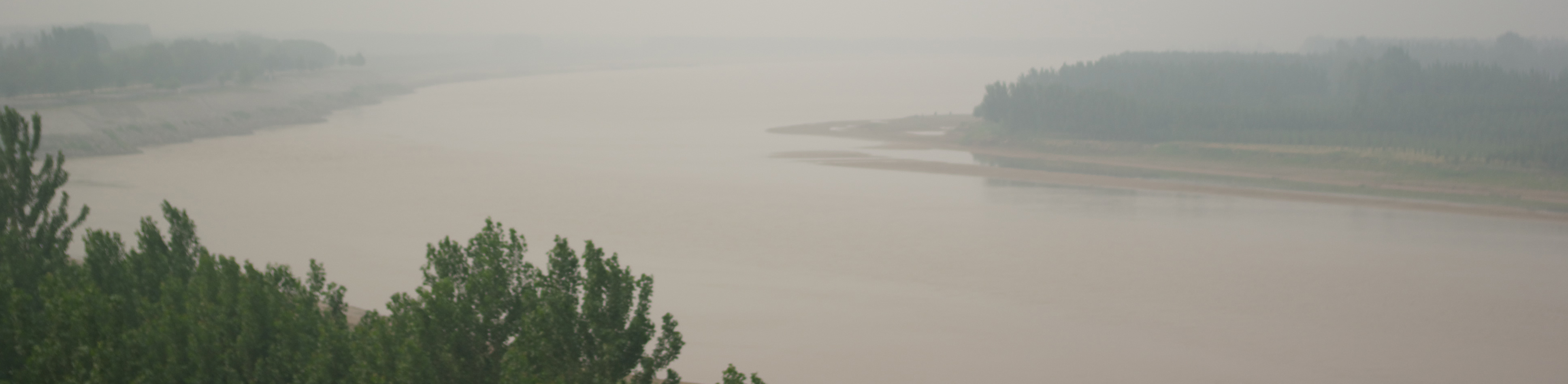
The Yellow River today
