= Prince of Lu =

Prince of Lu is a title in imperial China. It may refer to:

- Princes of Lu during the Han dynasty and Cao Wei dynasty
- Li Congke (885–937), Later Tang emperor, earlier known as Prince of Lu (潞王)
- Zhu Yihai (1618–1662), Southern Ming emperor, earlier known as Prince of Lu (魯王)
- Ren Zhu (died 1867), prince or King of the Nien Rebellion
