= 1453 Yellow River flood =

Natural disaster in China

The 1453 Yellow River flood was a natural disaster in the area surrounding Shawan in Shandong, China, during the Ming dynasty. The banks – repaired just the year before – burst again in the fourth lunar month and again in the fifth.

== See also ==
- 1452 Yellow River floods
