= 1448 Yellow River flood =

Natural disaster

The 1448 Yellow River flood was a major natural disaster affecting over 2000 li (about 700 miles) of the Yellow River. The flood threatened to destroy the Grand Canal port of Linqing and led to the Ming dynasty constructing major public works in Shawan to prevent a recurrence. The banks and dikes only lasted four years until the 1452 flood.
