= Zou Yilin =

Chinese historical geographer and educator (1935–2020)

- 邹逸麟
- Born: August 31, 1935; Shanghai, China
- Died: June 19, 2020 (aged 84); Shanghai, China
- Education: Shandong University
- Scientific career
- Fields: Historical geography
- Workplaces: Fudan University
- Doctoral advisor: Tan Qixiang

Chinese name
- Traditional Chinese: 鄒逸麟
- Simplified Chinese: 邹逸麟
Transcriptions
Standard Mandarin
- Hanyu Pinyin: Zōu Yìlín

Zou Yilin (Chinese: 邹逸麟; pinyin: Zōu Yìlín; 31 August 1935 – 19 June 2020) was a Chinese historical geographer and educator who was a professor at Fudan University. He was a member of the 8th, 9th, 10th National Committee of the Chinese People's Political Consultative Conference. He was a member of the Association of Chinese Historians and the Geographical Society of China.

== Biography ==
Zou was born in Shanghai, on August 31, 1935, while his ancestral home is in Shaoxing, Zhejiang. He secondary studied at Jinke High School (金科中学), which was a private high school run by Catholic Church. In 1952, he was accepted by Shandong University, where he studied historical geography under Tan Qixiang. After university in 1956, he was assigned to the Institute of history, Chinese Academy of Sciences as a researcher. In 1962, he moved to Fudan University as an assistant, he was promoted to instructor in 1978 and to associate professor in 1980. He served as deputy director of its Institute of Historical Geography in 1982, and four years later promoted to the Director position. In 1994, he joined the China Democratic League and once served as a member of its 7th and 8th Central Committee. He died of illness at Xinhua Hospital, in Shanghai, on June 19, 2020. He is survived by two granddaughters and two grandsons.

== Works ==
- 中国历史地理十讲 [Historical Geography of China] (in Chinese). Shanghai: Fudan University Press. 2019. ISBN 9787309144567.
- 舟楫往来通南北 中国大运河 [The Grand Canal of China] (in Chinese). Suzhou, Jiangsu: Jiangsu Science and Technology Press. 2018. ISBN 9787553788203.
- 邹逸麟口述历史 [Zou Yilin's Oral History] (in Chinese). Shanghai: Shanghai Bookstore Publishing House. 2016. ISBN 9787545812817.
- 中国历史人文地理 [Historical Humanities Geography of China] (in Chinese). Beijing: Science Press. 2019. ISBN 9787030090652.
- 明清以来长江三角洲地区城镇地理与环境研究 [A Study on the Urban Geography and Environment of the Yangtze River Delta since the Ming and Qing Dynasties] (in Chinese). Shanghai: Commercial Press. 2013. ISBN 9787100098014.
- 椿庐史地论稿续编 (in Chinese). Shanghai: Shanghai People's Publishing House. 2014. ISBN 9787208119727.
- 中国历史地理概述 [An Overview of the Historical Geography of China] (in Chinese). Shanghai: Shanghai Education Press. 2007. ISBN 9787544413534.
- 千古黄河 [Ancient Yellow River] (in Chinese). Shanghai: Shanghai Far East Publishers. ISBN 9787547606315.
- Hua Linfu; Zou Yilin (2014). 清代地理志书研究 [A Study of Geographical Records in the Qing Dynasty] (in Chinese). Beijing: Renmin University Press of China. ISBN 9787300185637.
