= 1194 Yellow River flood =

1194 flood in China

The 1194 Yellow River flood was a series of natural disasters along the Yellow River in China during the Jurchen Jin dynasty.

The Grand Canal was used to provide extensive disaster relief, but the flood devastated large swathes of the north China plain, wrecked the regional economy, and created many thousands of refugees. It altered the course of the Yellow River from that taken along the Hai River past modern Tianjin during the 1048 flood and also permanently shifted (and shrank) the course of the Si River in Shandong. The former course into the Huai was no longer available once the Yellow River shifted again, as it had left behind 4–6 meters of mud.

== See also ==
- Floods of the Yellow River
