= Lu Wang (biostatistician) =

Chinese-American biostatistician

Lu Wang is a Chinese-American biostatistician whose research topics have included causal inference, dynamic decision-making for medical treatments, missing data, and environmental health. She has also studied the correlation between mercury from seafood and autoimmune disease, and the benefits of providing improved transportation services for healthcare, as a member of the Michigan Institute for Healthcare Policy & Innovation. She is a professor of biostatistics and associate chair for research in biostatistics in the University of Michigan School of Public Health.

== Education and career ==
Wang studied statistics as an undergraduate at Peking University, graduating in 2002. She came to the US for a master's degree in biostatistics at the University of Michigan in 2004, advised by Jeremy Taylor. Next, she continued her studies in biostatistics in the Harvard T.H. Chan School of Public Health, where she earned a second master's degree in 2007 and completed her Ph.D. in 2008. Her doctoral dissertation, Nonparametric and Semiparametric Regression with Missing Data, was jointly supervised by Xihong Lin and Andrea Rotnitzky.

She returned to the University of Michigan as an assistant professor of biostatistics in 2008, and was named John G. Searle Assistant Professor in 2015. She was promoted to associate professor in 2015 and full professor in 2020. She has been associate chair for research since 2021.

== Recognition ==
Wang was named a Fellow of the American Statistical Association in 2023, "for novel contributions to missing data analysis, longitudinal data analysis, and dynamic treatment regimens for personalized health care; for outstanding interdisciplinary research; for leadership in biostatistics education and training; and for excellent service to the profession".
