= Floods in Xuzhou's history =

The Yellow River has been recognized by Chinese as "the mother river". But in ancient times, people living by the Yellow River often suffered its floods. Xuzhou was one such city.

Located by the after-bay of the Yellow River, Xuzhou suffered from Yellow River floods since the Han dynasty until the Yellow River changed its course in 1855, the 5th Year of Xianfeng in the Qing dynasty (清代咸丰五年).

During the years that the Yellow River passed Xuzhou, the city was flooded more than 400 times, ten times in the Qin and Han dynasty, 19 times in the Wei and Jin (晋) dynasty, 20 times in the Sui and Tang dynasty, 50 times in the Liao, Song and Yuan dynasty, 120 times, and two hundred and three times in the Qin dynasty.

== Five heaviest floods recorded ==
The earliest flood recorded happened in 132 B.C., the 3rd Year of Yuanguang (元光三年) in the West Han dynasty (206–9 B.C.). One of the major dams built in Hu Zi (瓠子), Puyang, Henan was suddenly burst and the river flooded 16 cities by the after-bay. Due to the blocked watercourse in Hu Zi in the 2nd Year of Yuanfeng (元封二年), the Yellow River changed its course to flow through Xuzhou. The flood continued for 24 years. Worried about the terrible situation, Emperor Han Wudi (156–87 B.C.) wrote down "Huzi ge" (瓠子歌) to express his sorrow and deep concern for the people in the flooded areas.

In 1077 A.D., the 10th Year of Xining, Song dynasty (宋熙宁十年), the river broke its banks in Tanzhou (檀州). The flood was just surrounding the city wall of Xuzhou and the depth of the water reached two Zhang and eight Chi (两丈八尺). Owing to the efforts of the official head Su Shi (苏轼), solidifying the dam and keeping the city in order, the water didn't rise above the wall and flow into the city; no one was hurt.

The other heaviest floods all happened in the Ming dynasty. The floods of the Ming dynasty have been more severe than in other dynasties. In the 5th Year of Longqing (隆庆五年), the river broke and poured into the city from the west gate, which resulted in thousands of houses ruined and countless citizens killed.

In 1590 A.D., the 18th Year of Wanli (万历十八年), undulated by the pouring Autumn rain, Xuzhou city was flooded again. Houses were all submerged and the flood continued for two years. After that the city was advised to move somewhere else, but the central government did not approved of it.

The most serious flood in Xuzhou's history happened on 16 July 1624 A.D., the 4th Year of Tianqi (天启四年). Happening at midnight, the flood poured into the city and the southeast wall of the city collapsed. The depth of the water in the city reached more than four meters. Not being prepared for the sudden flood, citizens had to leave the flooded houses and move to Mountain Yunlong (云龙山) to escape the flood. Since the Yellow River is the river which has the greatest concentration of sediment in the world, Xuzhou was buried completely by the sand of the Yellow River after the flood went back down, with the height of the sand accumulation ranging from one to ten meters. The relocation of the city was proposed again but was still denied by the central government. People had to rebuild the city right above the buried one.

== Influence of the floods ==
The loss of agricultural production and the loss of public and private possessions were inevitable.

=== The Abandoned Yellow River ===
The Yellow River changed its course in the 5th Year of Xianfeng, Qing dynasty and never passed Xuzhou again, so the river course in Xuzhou was abandoned. Now the Abandoned Yellow River has become a famous tourist attraction in Xuzhou. In the Abandoned River park, there are five posts standing by the shore with the flood history recorded on them called Shui Jing Shi Zhu Ji (水经石柱记).

=== The underground city ===
After the flood in 1624, people in Xuzhou built a new city resembling to the buried one. In the 1950s, part of the buried one was found. The old city was gradually exposed in the following 50 years’ excavation. The underground city has an essential meaning to the origin, development and evolution of Xuzhou City.
