= 1034 Yellow River flood =

Natural disaster in China

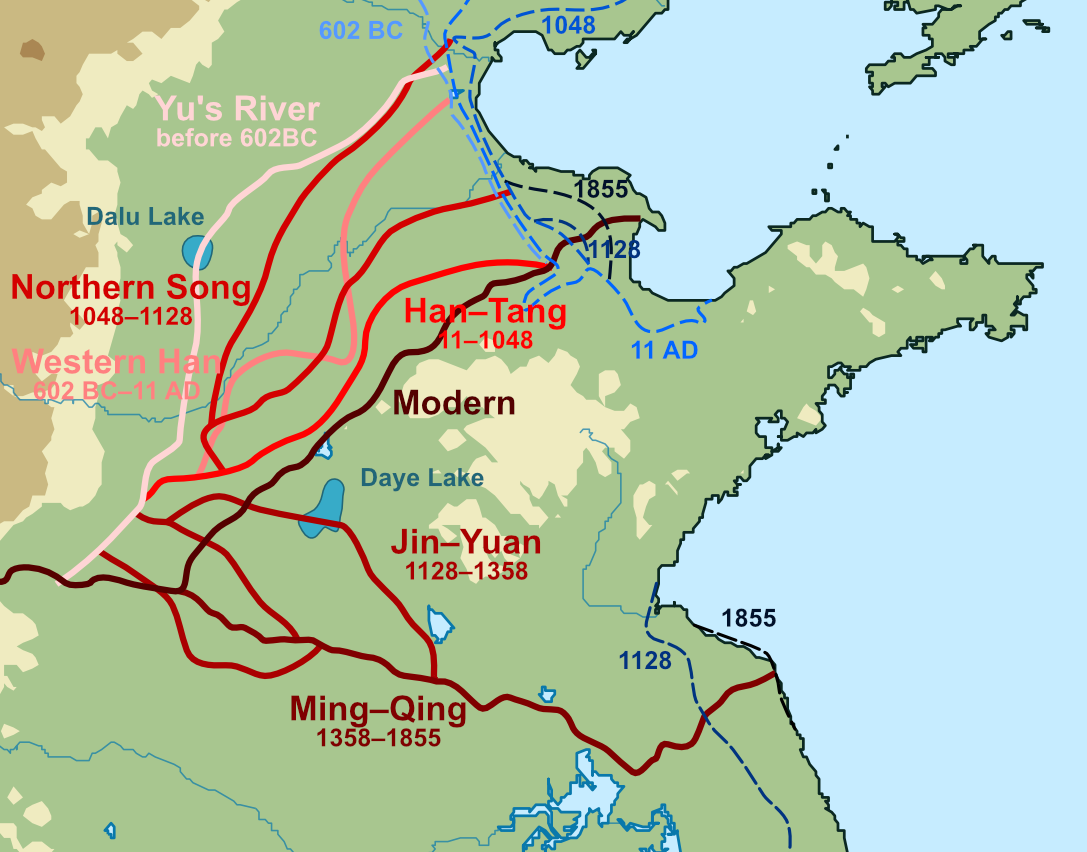
- Date: July 1034
- Location: Modern-day northern Shandong and southern Hebei
- Cause: Heavy rainfall leading to the bursting of a fascine
- Deaths: unknown
- Property damage: Significant damage to agricultural regions around Dezhou and Bozhou; decreased revenues in northern provinces of the Northern Song

1034 Yellow River flood
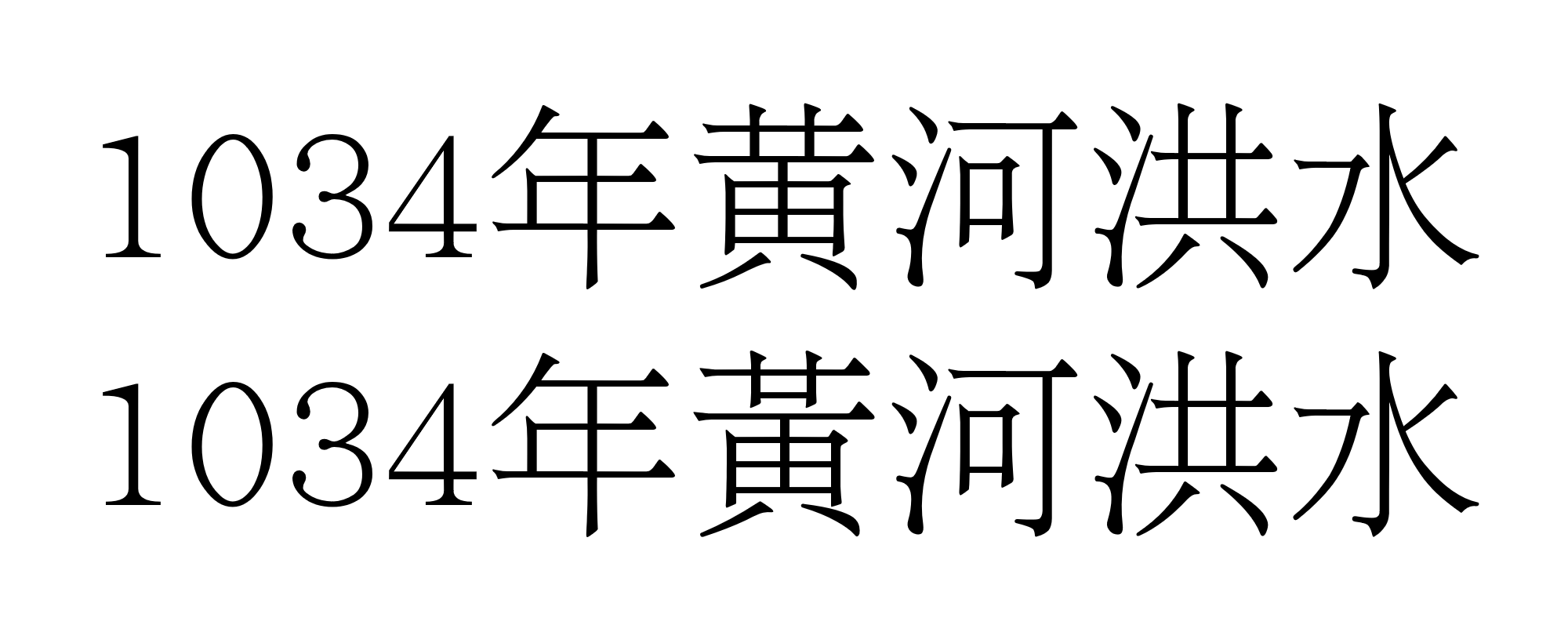
- "1034 Yellow River flood" in Simplified (top) Chinese characters, and Traditional (bottom) Chinese characters
- Traditional Chinese: 1034年黃河洪水
- Simplified Chinese: 1034年黄河洪水
Transcriptions
Standard Mandarin
- Hanyu Pinyin: 1034 nián Huánghé hóngshuǐ
- Wade–Giles: 1034 nien^{2} Huang^{2} Ho^{2} hung^{2}-shui^{3}
- IPA: [njɛ̌nxwǎŋxɤ̌xʊ̌ŋʂwèɪ]
Yue: Cantonese
- Jyutping: 1034 nin^{4} wong^{4}-ho^{4} hung^{4}-seoi^{2}
Southern Min
- Hokkien POJ: 1034 nî n̂g-hô âng-súi

The AD 1034 Yellow River flood was a natural disaster along China's Yellow River originating in a burst fascine following heavy rainfall at Henglong in the territory of the Northern Song. The flood divided the Yellow River from its previous course into three more northerly channels meeting the Chihe, You, and Jin.

The Yellow River's new channels caused flooding in the rich northern regions of Dezhou and Bozhou, as well as reducing revenues in the northern regions of the Northern Song. The Yellow River flooded once again in 1048, causing the river's course to move northward past the southern Hebei-Shandong region, where it had led into the sea before. The period of time surrounding both the 1034 Yellow River flood and the succeeding 1048 Yellow River flood is generally referred to as the "Song Dynasty period of two rivers".

== Background ==
In the rule of the Northern Song dynasty over China, there were four major floods of the Yellow River to note. The first one of these floods occurred before the year in 983, while the other three occurred after AD 1000 in 1019, 1034, and 1048 respectively. Before the 1034 flood, the Yellow River followed the same route it had since the year 11. In order to maintain protection from the heavy annual rains around July, a system of fascines were constructed along much of the river's path in areas controlled by the Northern Song.

== Flood ==
During a period of intense rainfall in July 1034, a fascine outside at Henglong burst, causing a massive flow of water from the Yellow River away from the course it had previously followed and been directed into. This diversion created three new channels that connected into the Chihe, You, and Jin rivers alongside the river's original outlet into the Bohai Sea. The amount of water brought into the Chihe, You, and Jin rivers stirred up massive amounts of sediment that were carried downriver.

== Aftermath ==
Unlike the controlled path of the Yellow River previously, the river's newly diverted path caused extensive flooding in the Dezhou and Bozhou regions (of modern-day Shandong). The large amounts of sediment picked up when the Yellow River's waters entered the Chihe, You, and Jin rivers also caused major economic damage to the northern provinces of the Northern Song where the tributary rivers led to. Under the rule of Renzong, an emperor known for his modesty, the Song worked for five years futilely attempting to restore the Yellow River's previous course. The period of time surrounding both the 1034 Yellow River flood and the succeeding 1048 Yellow River flood is generally referred to as the "Song Dynasty period of two rivers".

This project used over 35,000 employees, 100,000 conscripts, and 220,000 tons of wood and bamboo in a single year – before the project was abandoned in 1041. Only seven years after the project to restore the river's course was ended, the Yellow River flood of 1048 caused the river to move much further north, meaning that the Chihe, You, and Jin rivers were no longer a threat to agriculture around modern-day Hebei and Shandong. Due to the flooding of agriculture in Dezhou and Bozhou, as well as the sediments carried along the Yellow River's three new tributary rivers, the 1034 flood was recorded as reducing the revenues of the northern provinces by half. The economic consequences of the first flood however were not fully repaired by the time that the second flood came, leading to yet more devastation in the northern provinces of the Northern Song.

== See also ==
- 1048 & 1494 Yellow River floods
- History & Economy of the Song dynasty
