= 1452 Yellow River floods =

Natural disasters in China

The 1452 Yellow River floods were major natural disasters affecting hundreds of thousands of farmers along the Yellow River in Shandong and Henan, as well as the Huai River valley.

The first flood destroyed the extensive public works created at Shawan just four years before as a result of the 1448 flood at Linqing. The silt flooded into the Grand Canal in Shandong required major effort to repair. After the earthworks had been repaired, the Jingtai Emperor ordered the construction of two temples – one at Heiyangshan and the other at Shawan – and committed himself to praying personally to the river gods for flood prevention.

By the sixth lunar month, the northern bank burst at Shawan again and the entire Grand Canal fleet was stranded by the sand thrown into its course.

== See also ==
- 1448 Yellow River flood
- 1453 Yellow River flood
