= Little West Lake =

- Location within Guizhou
- Location: Tongzi, Guizhou
- Coordinates: 28.145°N 106.858°E
- Type: lake

Little West Lake (Chinese: 小西湖; pinyin: Xiǎo Xī Hú) is a lake in Tongzi, Guizhou Province, located in a natural tourist area known as the Northern Guizhou Pearl. Little West Lake, which houses the biggest Hydropower Station in Tongzi, was built in the 1940s. Tn 1944 General Zhang Xueliang was arrested there because of the Xi'an incident.

Fronting water and with a hill at the back, the Little West Lake had a dense growth of evergreen trees and formed a "retreat away from the world". There is a natural cave. The lake can be traveled by boat.
