= Sishui County =

Sishui County 泗水县 Szeshui
- County
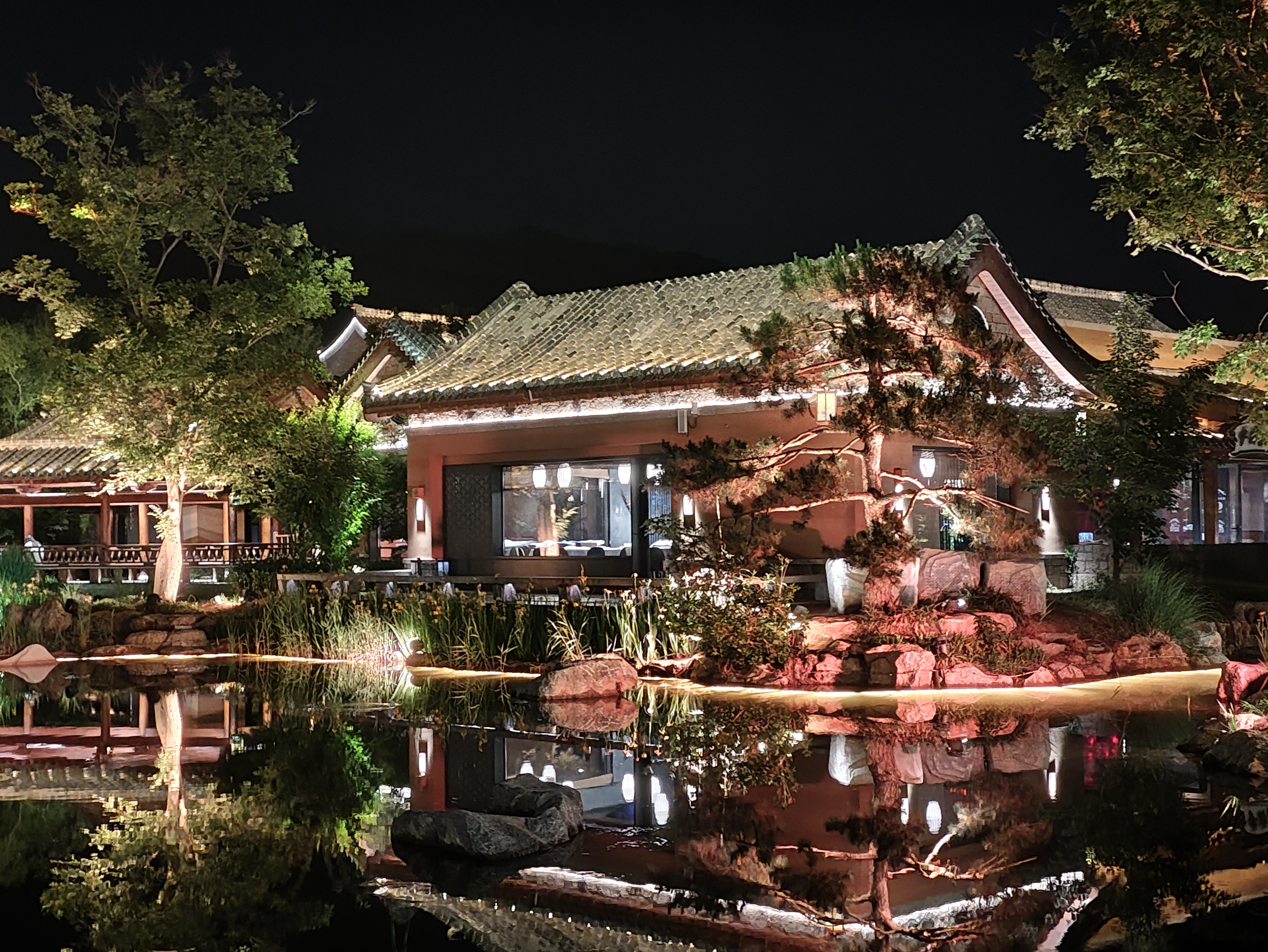
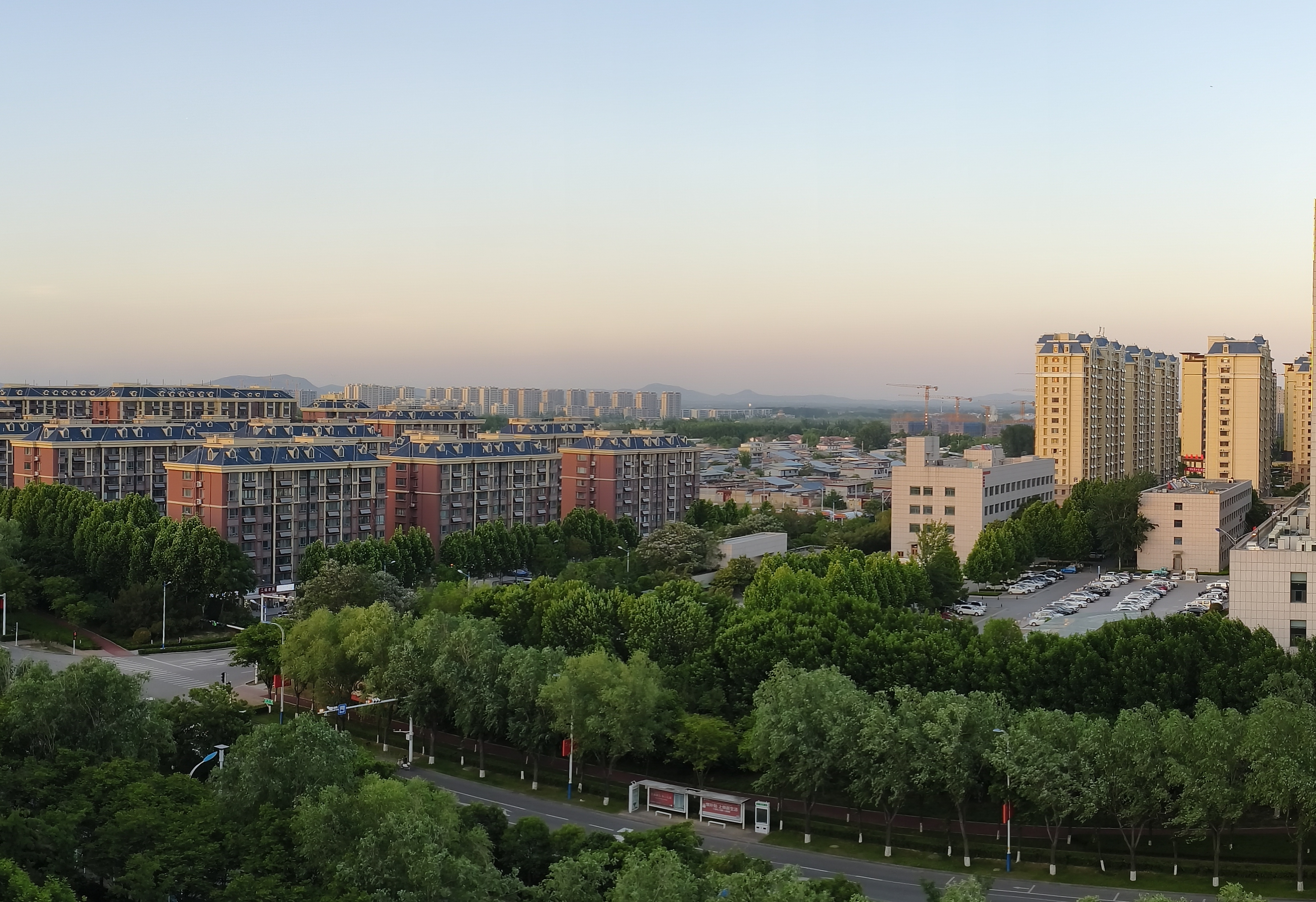
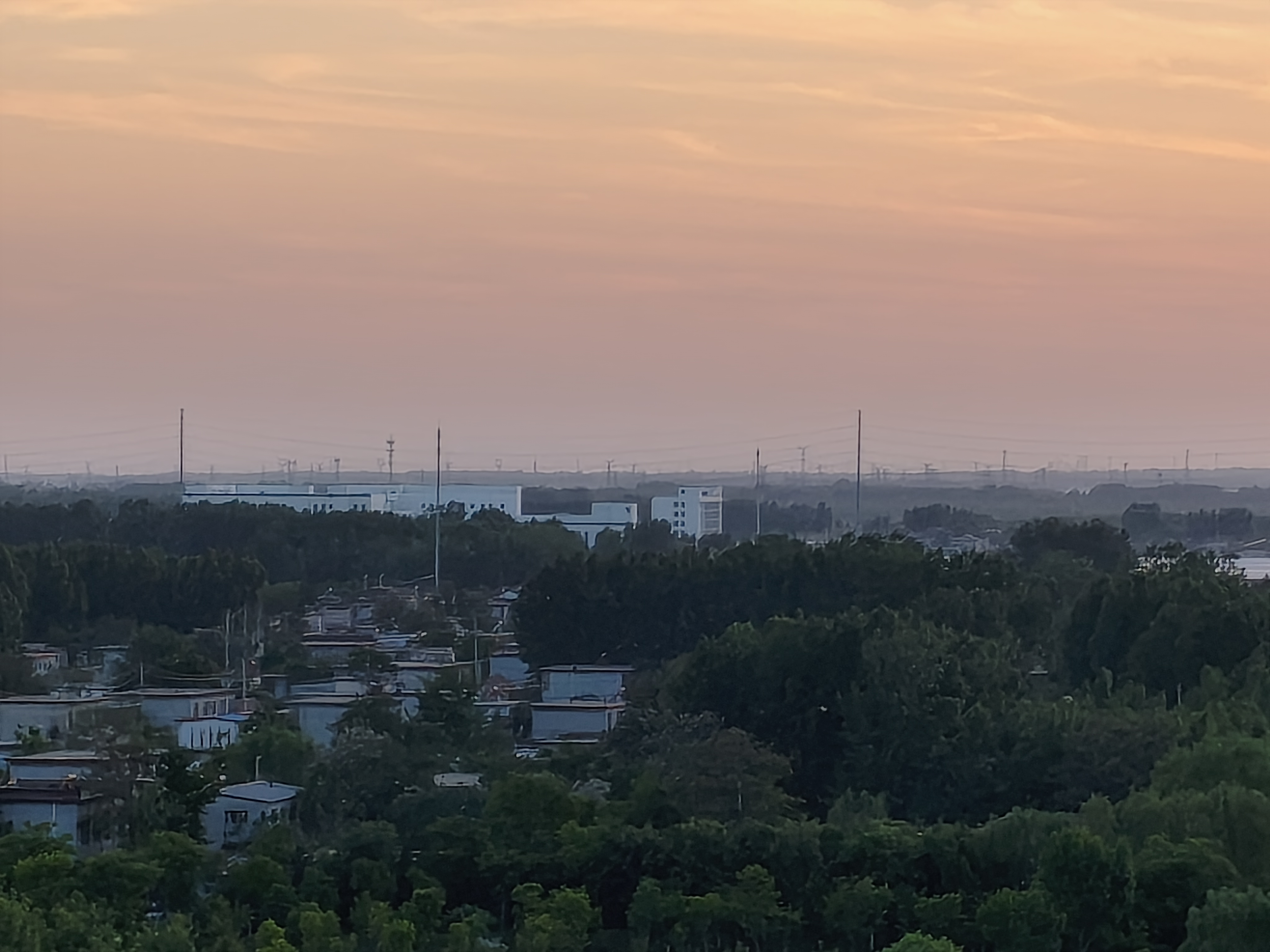
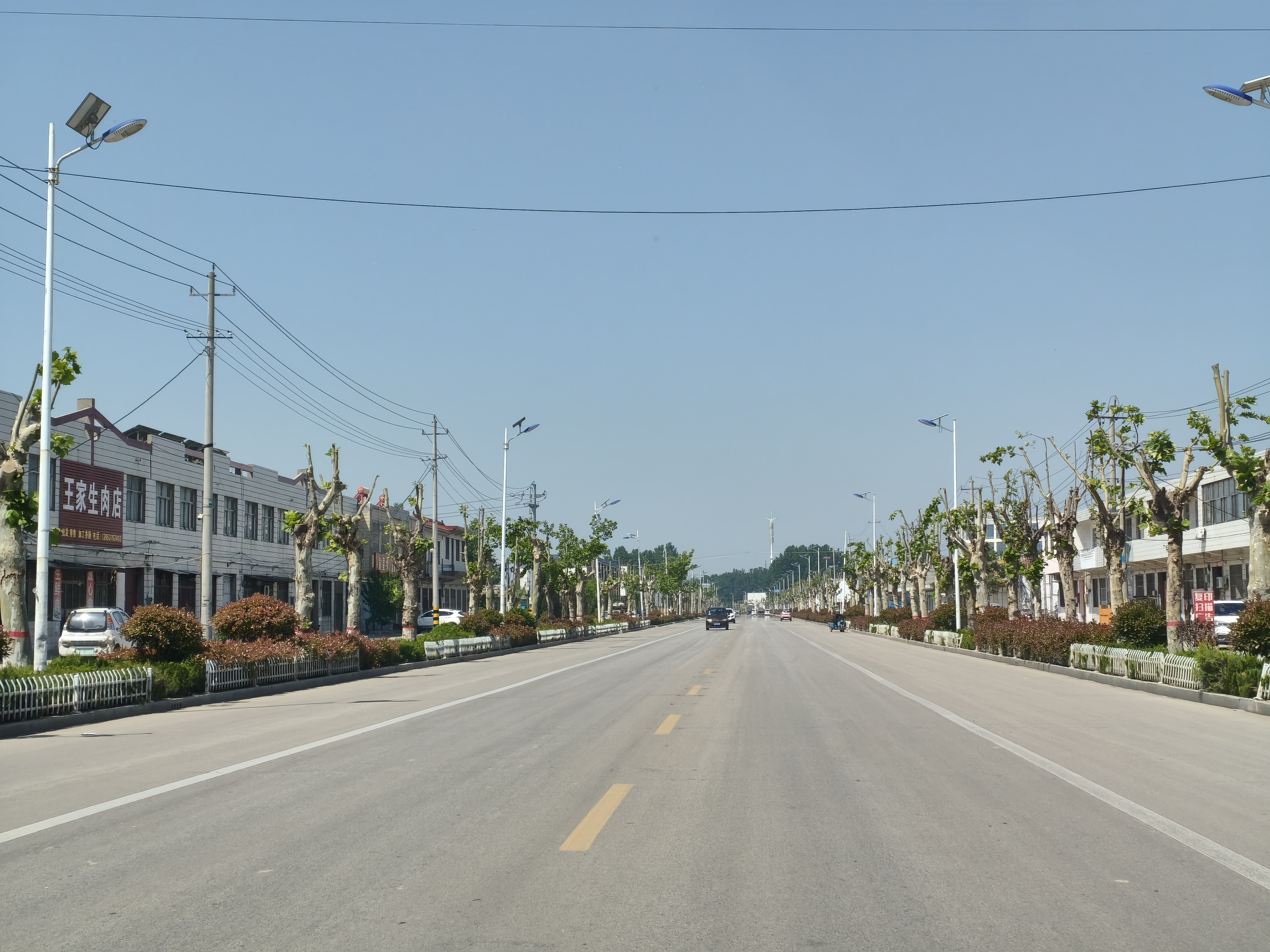
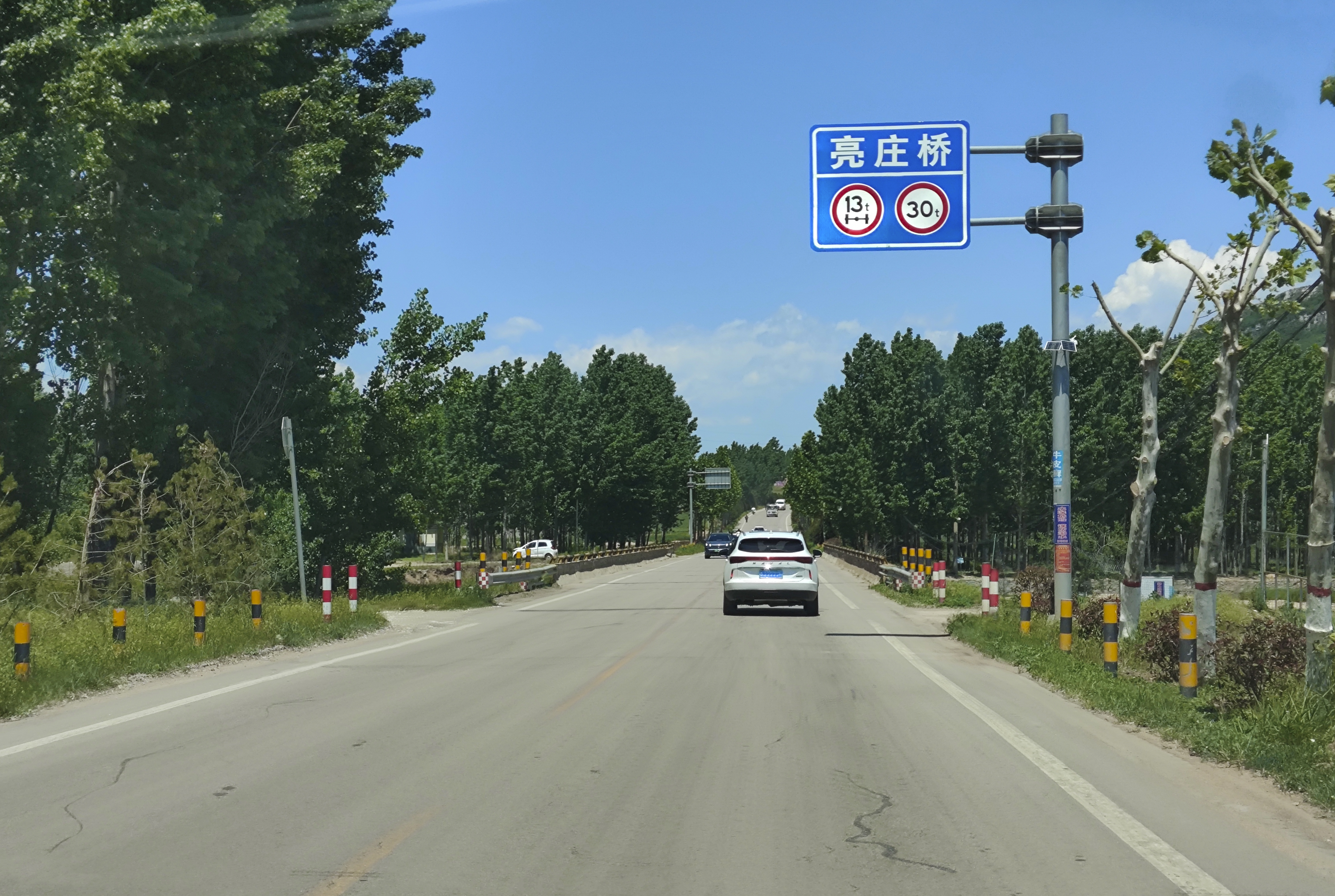
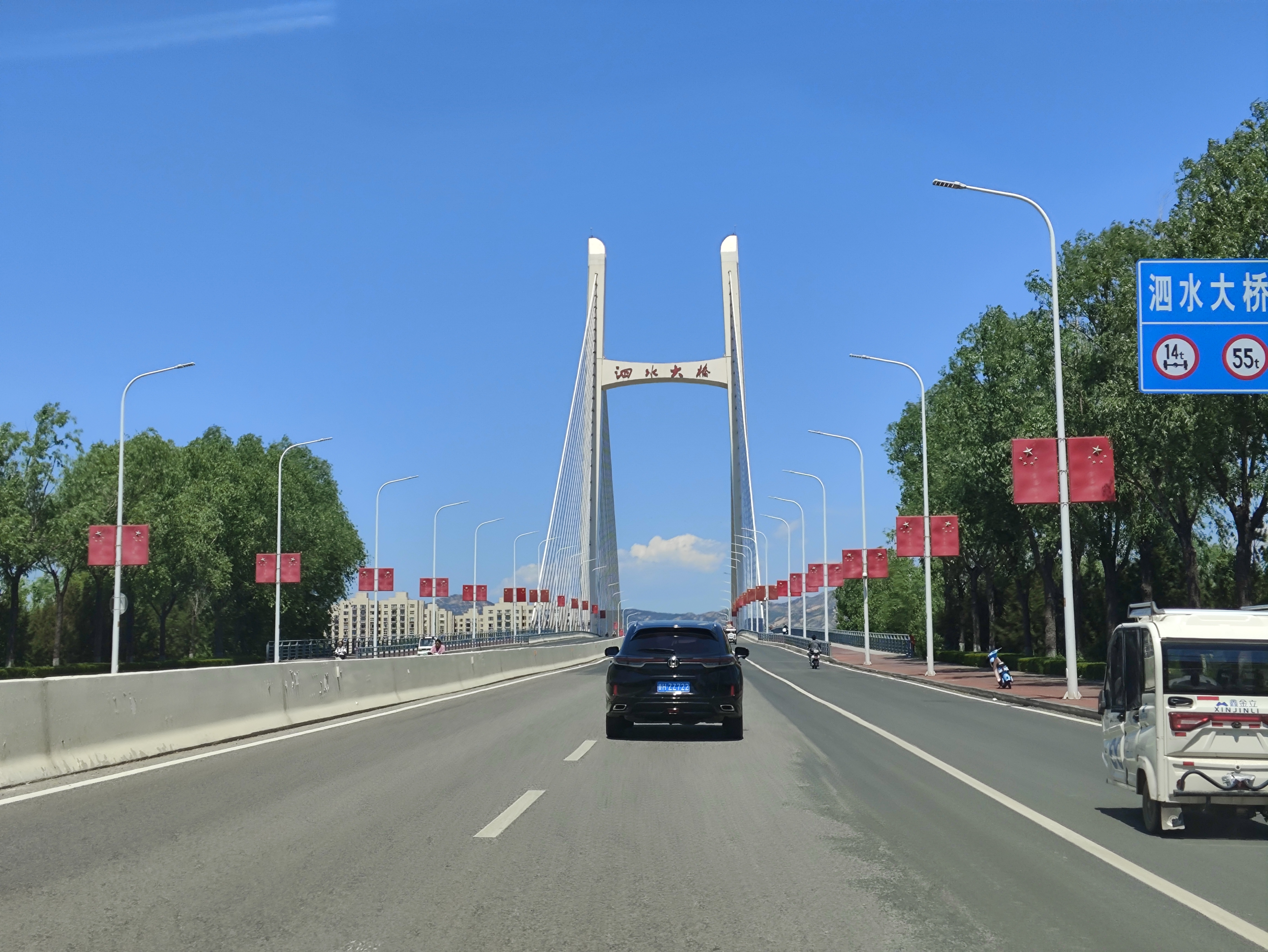
- Luyuan Village countryside scene Skyline viewed from the northeast, Sanfa Mingdi building Panoramic skyline from Sanfa Mingdi rooftop Xing-Wu Road, Gaoyu Town Liangzhuang Bridge on Yaoxin Road, Gaoyu Town Sihe Bridge, Sishui County

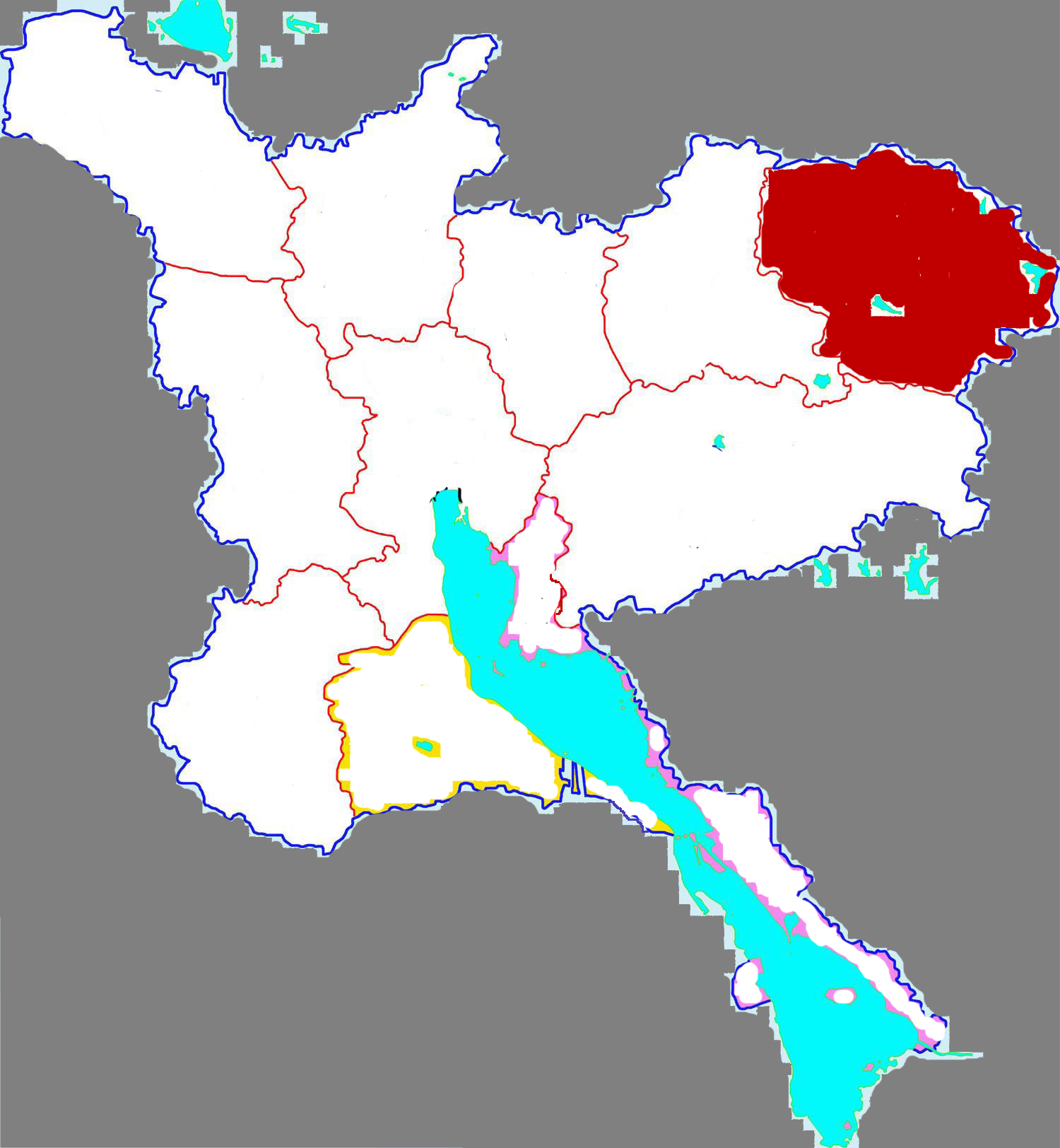
- Location in Jining

- Location of the seat in Shandong
- Coordinates: 35.664°N 117.251°E
- Country: People's Republic of China
- Province: Shandong
- Prefecture-level city: Jining

Area
  - Total: 1,118.11 km^{2} (431.70 sq mi)
- Elevation: 105 m (344 ft)

Population (2017)
  - Total: 552,300
  - Density: 494.0/km^{2} (1,279/sq mi)
- Time zone: UTC+8 (China Standard)
- Postal code: 273200
- Website: www.sishui.gov.cn

Sishui County (simplified Chinese: 泗水县; traditional Chinese: 泗水縣; pinyin: Sìshuǐ Xiàn) is a county of southwestern Shandong province, People's Republic of China. It is the easternmost county-level division of Jining City. It takes its name from the Si River, which flows through the county.

The population was 590,326 in 1999.

== Administrative divisions ==
As of 2012, this county is divided to 2 subdistricts, 8 towns and 3 townships.

Subdistricts

- Sihe Subdistrict (泗河街道)
- Jihe Subdistrict (济河街道)

Towns

- Quanlin (泉林镇)
- Xingcun (星村镇)
- Zhegou (柘沟镇)
- Jinzhuang (金庄镇)
- Miaoguan (苗馆镇)
- Zhongce (中册镇)
- Yangliu (杨柳镇)
- Sizhang (泗张镇)

Townships

- Shengshuiyu Township (圣水峪乡)
- Dahuanggou Township (大黄沟乡)
- Gaoyu Township (高峪乡)

== Climate ==
Climate data for Sishui, elevation 110 m (360 ft), (1991–2020 normals, extremes 1981–2010)
Month	Jan	Feb	Mar	Apr	May	Jun	Jul	Aug	Sep	Oct	Nov	Dec	Year
Record high °C (°F)	18.5 (65.3)	23.2 (73.8)	28.8 (83.8)	33.5 (92.3)	37.5 (99.5)	39.6 (103.3)	41.3 (106.3)	37.5 (99.5)	36.4 (97.5)	34.7 (94.5)	26.1 (79.0)	19.0 (66.2)	41.3 (106.3)
Mean daily maximum °C (°F)	5.0 (41.0)	8.6 (47.5)	14.9 (58.8)	21.8 (71.2)	27.3 (81.1)	31.3 (88.3)	31.9 (89.4)	30.8 (87.4)	27.2 (81.0)	21.5 (70.7)	13.6 (56.5)	6.8 (44.2)	20.1 (68.1)
Daily mean °C (°F)	−0.5 (31.1)	2.8 (37.0)	8.8 (47.8)	15.7 (60.3)	21.4 (70.5)	25.6 (78.1)	27.3 (81.1)	26.1 (79.0)	21.6 (70.9)	15.2 (59.4)	7.8 (46.0)	1.3 (34.3)	14.4 (58.0)
Mean daily minimum °C (°F)	−4.6 (23.7)	−1.8 (28.8)	3.4 (38.1)	9.7 (49.5)	15.4 (59.7)	20.2 (68.4)	23.3 (73.9)	22.2 (72.0)	17.0 (62.6)	10.2 (50.4)	3.2 (37.8)	−2.8 (27.0)	9.6 (49.3)
Record low °C (°F)	−16.7 (1.9)	−14.4 (6.1)	−11.2 (11.8)	−2.4 (27.7)	3.6 (38.5)	9.9 (49.8)	16.7 (62.1)	12.5 (54.5)	6.1 (43.0)	−3.3 (26.1)	−11.4 (11.5)	−15.4 (4.3)	−16.7 (1.9)
Average precipitation mm (inches)	7.2 (0.28)	13.1 (0.52)	15.2 (0.60)	36.4 (1.43)	55.4 (2.18)	88.8 (3.50)	211.6 (8.33)	195.8 (7.71)	69.9 (2.75)	29.9 (1.18)	28.6 (1.13)	10.1 (0.40)	762 (30.01)
Average precipitation days (≥ 0.1 mm)	2.9	3.8	3.7	5.5	6.9	7.7	11.8	11.5	7.4	5.3	5.0	3.4	74.9
Average snowy days	2.7	2.6	0.7	0.2	0	0	0	0	0	0	0.9	1.7	8.8
Average relative humidity (%)	60	56	51	54	58	62	77	79	73	68	66	63	64
Mean monthly sunshine hours	151.9	155.0	198.4	216.5	233.5	203.3	180.7	179.3	180.3	179.7	155.7	153.5	2,187.8
Percentage possible sunshine	49	50	53	55	53	47	41	43	49	52	51	51	50
Source: China Meteorological Administration
