= 1391 Yellow River flood =

Natural disaster in China

The 1391 Yellow River flood was a major natural disaster during the early Ming dynasty in China.

The river flooded from Kaifeng to Fengyang in Anhui and shifted course, with the old route past Xuzhou becoming known as the "Little Yellow River" and the new main artery running into the Huai River becoming the "Big Yellow River".
