= Wang Lü =

Chinese landscape painter, calligrapher, poet and physician

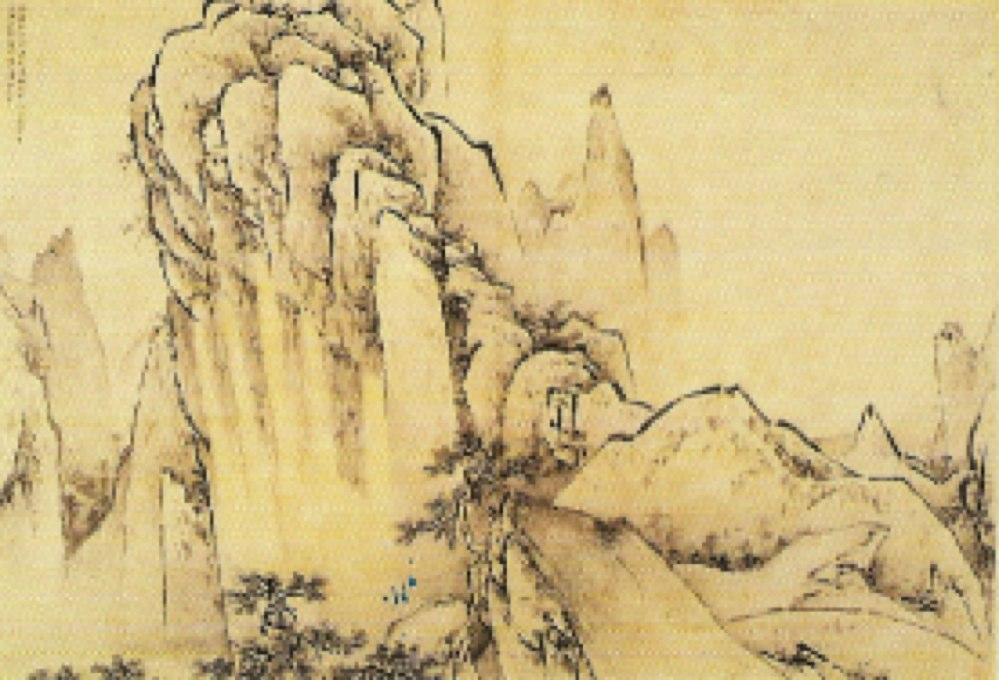
Mount Hua by the Chinese painter Wang Lü (1332-1383), album sheet, ink and light colour on paper, Ming dynasty. Its dimensions in centimetres are: 34.5x50.5. Of the forty executed, only eleven remain in two preserved in the Shanghai Museums and the Imperial Palace Museum in Beijing.

Wang Lü (Chinese: 王履; pinyin: Wáng Lǚ; c. 1332–?) was a Chinese landscape painter, calligrapher, poet and physician who was active during the Ming dynasty (1368–1644). His specific date of death is unknown.

Wang was born in Kunshan in the Jiangsu province. His style name was 'Andao' (安道 Āndào "peaceful way/path") and his sobriquets were 'Jisou and Baodu laoren' (畸叟 jī sǒu "odd old gentleman", and 抱獨老人/抱独老人 bào dú lào rén "old man embraced by solitude"). Wang's painting followed the style of Xia Gui. Some of his works included:

- Album Leaf Paintings of HuaShan
- Shu Hui Album - twenty-one pieces
- Yi Yun Tong - one hundred volumes
