= 1410 Yellow River flood =

Natural disaster in China

A flood of the Yellow River affected the area around Kaifeng, China, during the early Ming dynasty. It struck during the early years of the reign of the usurping Yongle Emperor, damaging thousands of acres of farmland and killing more than 14,000 families.
