= Wanglu =

Wanglu 王鲁镇
- Town
- Location in Shandong Wanglu (China)
- Coordinates: 35°2′16″N 116°35′14″E
- Country: People's Republic of China
- Province: Shandong
- Prefecture-level city: Jining
- County: Yutai County
- Time zone: UTC+8 (China Standard)

Wanglu (Chinese: 王鲁) is a town of Yutai County, Shandong, China. As of 2018, it has 17 villages under its administration.
