= 1384 Yellow River flood =

Natural disaster in China

The 1384 Yellow River flood was a natural disaster affecting the area around Kaifeng, China, during the early Ming dynasty.
