= 1416 Yellow River flood =

15th century natural disaster

The 1416 Yellow River flood was a natural disaster affecting the area around Kaifeng, China, during the early Ming dynasty. The flood spilled over into fourteen other counties and seriously disturbed the Huai River.
