= 1375 Yellow River flood =

Flood event of the Yellow River in China in 1375

The 1375 Yellow River flood was a natural disaster affecting the area around Kaifeng, China during the early Ming dynasty. Contemporary sources mentioned a death toll of between 15,000 and 25,000 people, most of them farmers. The philosopher Wang Yangming mentioned the 1375 Yellow River flood as an example of how even a virtuous man can be destroyed by the power of nature.
