= Yutai County =

Yutai County 鱼台县
- County
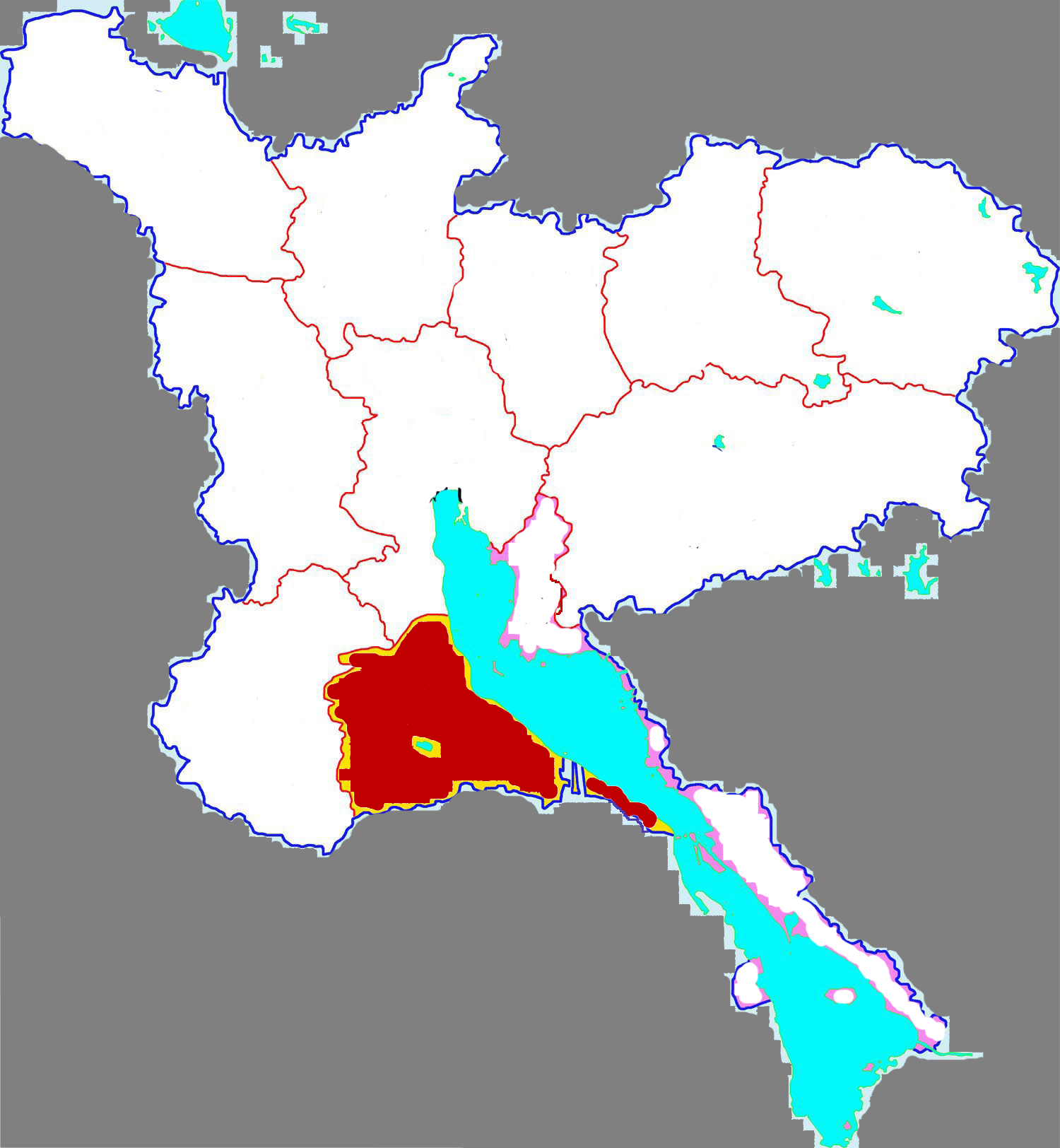
- Location in Jining

- Location of the seat in Shandong
- Coordinates: 35.013°N 116.651°E
- Country: People's Republic of China
- Province: Shandong
- Prefecture-level city: Jining

Area
  - Total: 653.07 km^{2} (252.15 sq mi)

Population (2019)
  - Total: 456,700
  - Density: 699.3/km^{2} (1,811/sq mi)
- Time zone: UTC+8 (China Standard)
- Postal code: 272300

Yutai County
- Traditional Chinese: 魚臺縣
- Simplified Chinese: 鱼台县
- Hanyu Pinyin: Yútái Xiàn
Transcriptions
Standard Mandarin
- Hanyu Pinyin: Yútái Xiàn
- Wade–Giles: Yü²-tʻai² Hsien⁴

Yutai County is a county in the southwest of Shandong province, China. It is under the administration of Jining City and borders the Jiangsu counties of Feng and Pei to the south, Weishan County (and Weishan Lake) to the east, Rencheng District to the north, and Jinxiang County to the west.

== Administrative divisions ==
As of 2012, this county is divided to 7 towns and 3 townships.

Towns

- Guting (谷亭镇)
- Qinghe (清河镇)
- Yucheng (鱼城镇)
- Wanglu (王鲁镇)
- Zhanghuang (张黄镇)
- Wangmiao (王庙镇)
- Lige (李阁镇)

Townships

- Tangma Township (唐马乡)
- Laozhai Township (老砦乡)
- Luotun Township (罗屯乡)

== Climate ==
Climate data for Yutai, elevation 34 m (112 ft), (1991–2020 normals, extremes 1981–2010)
Month	Jan	Feb	Mar	Apr	May	Jun	Jul	Aug	Sep	Oct	Nov	Dec	Year
Record high °C (°F)	16.2 (61.2)	23.7 (74.7)	28.0 (82.4)	31.8 (89.2)	36.6 (97.9)	38.4 (101.1)	40.1 (104.2)	36.0 (96.8)	34.4 (93.9)	34.3 (93.7)	26.3 (79.3)	20.1 (68.2)	40.1 (104.2)
Mean daily maximum °C (°F)	5.1 (41.2)	8.9 (48.0)	14.7 (58.5)	21.1 (70.0)	26.4 (79.5)	30.9 (87.6)	31.4 (88.5)	30.4 (86.7)	26.8 (80.2)	21.5 (70.7)	13.7 (56.7)	7.0 (44.6)	19.8 (67.7)
Daily mean °C (°F)	0.0 (32.0)	3.2 (37.8)	8.8 (47.8)	15.1 (59.2)	20.7 (69.3)	25.5 (77.9)	27.3 (81.1)	26.3 (79.3)	21.8 (71.2)	15.8 (60.4)	8.3 (46.9)	1.9 (35.4)	14.6 (58.2)
Mean daily minimum °C (°F)	−3.9 (25.0)	−1.2 (29.8)	3.8 (38.8)	9.6 (49.3)	15.3 (59.5)	20.6 (69.1)	23.9 (75.0)	23.1 (73.6)	17.9 (64.2)	11.3 (52.3)	4.2 (39.6)	−2.0 (28.4)	10.2 (50.4)
Record low °C (°F)	−15.9 (3.4)	−17.0 (1.4)	−9.6 (14.7)	−2.1 (28.2)	3.7 (38.7)	11.6 (52.9)	17.6 (63.7)	13.2 (55.8)	6.6 (43.9)	−2.0 (28.4)	−10.8 (12.6)	−15.8 (3.6)	−17.0 (1.4)
Average precipitation mm (inches)	10.1 (0.40)	16.0 (0.63)	20.2 (0.80)	35.0 (1.38)	56.7 (2.23)	96.9 (3.81)	191.8 (7.55)	172.1 (6.78)	67.7 (2.67)	31.2 (1.23)	30.4 (1.20)	12.1 (0.48)	740.2 (29.16)
Average precipitation days (≥ 0.1 mm)	3.1	4.0	3.9	5.6	6.8	7.4	11.3	10.3	7.2	5.6	5.0	3.4	73.6
Average snowy days	2.7	2.2	0.5	0.1	0	0	0	0	0	0	0.7	1.2	7.4
Average relative humidity (%)	67	64	62	65	68	67	81	83	79	73	72	70	71
Mean monthly sunshine hours	153.6	160.2	205.2	229.7	248.0	229.6	213.2	208.5	190.6	184.2	159.8	151.9	2,334.5
Percentage possible sunshine	49	52	55	58	57	53	49	51	52	53	52	50	53
Source: China Meteorological Administration
