= 1851–1855 Yellow River floods =

Yellow River floods, 1851–1855

Historical evolution of the course of the Yellow River

The 1851–1855 Yellow River floods were a series of natural disasters along the Yellow River in China, culminating in the 1855 channel change event. Some data is missing from this period, especially 1854. But it seems that water levels were high for most of 1851-1855.

The Yellow River had flowed along various courses south of the Shandong Peninsula since the disastrous floods of 1194. These mid-19th century floods reversed that, shifting the river into a path north of Shandong once again, and causing it to empty into the Bohai Sea near Tianjin, rather than the Yellow Sea on the Jiangsu coast.

This natural disaster is thought to have been a major cause of the Taiping and Nian rebellions.

== See also ==
- Floods of the Yellow River
