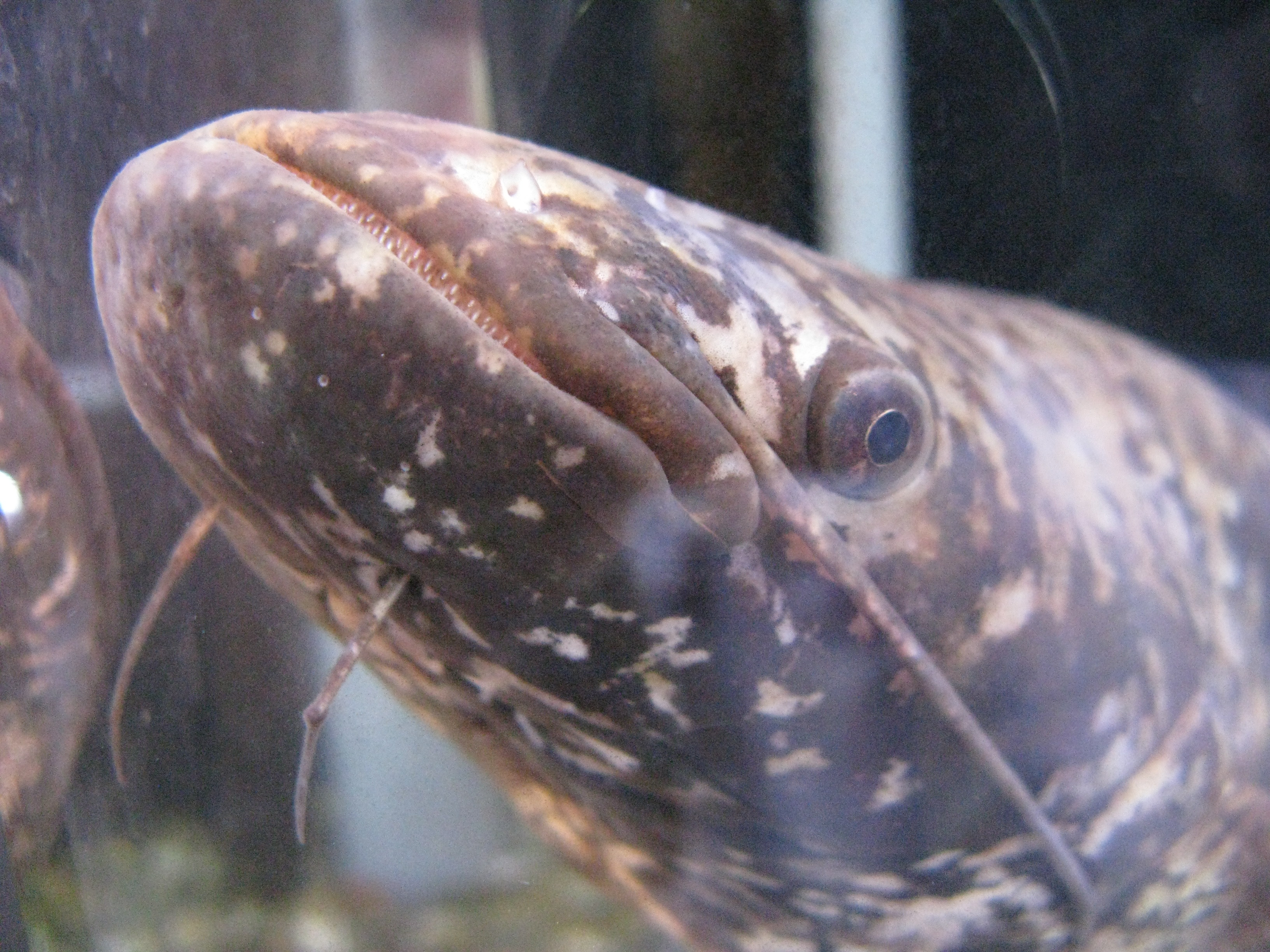

Conservation status
- Vulnerable (IUCN 3.1)

Scientific classification
- Kingdom: Animalia
- Phylum: Chordata
- Class: Actinopterygii
- Division: Teleostei
- Order: Siluriformes
- Family: Siluridae
- Genus: Silurus
- Species: S. lithophilus

Binomial name
- Silurus lithophilus Tomoda, 1961

Synonyms
- Parasilurus lithophilus Tomoda, 1961

= Silurus lithophilus =

Species of fish

Silurus lithophilus, the rock catfish (in Japanese, イワトコナマズ [iwatoko-namazu]), is a species of catfish that is endemic to the Lake Biwa basin in Japan. It primarily inhabits rocky habitats.

Silurus lithophilus is a predator that feeds on small fishes, crustaceans and insects. It is caught for food around Lake Biwa, but is usually eaten locally in Gifu Prefecture rather than exported. This species reaches a maximum length of 58.0 cm (22.8 in) and maximum weight of 1.5kg (3.3 lbs), although 21.2cm (8.3 in) is more typical.

It is most closely related to the Japanese populations of the Amur catfish, Silurus asotus. A leucistic variation of this species occurs in the wild, and appears to occur with higher frequency than in other catfishes.

Silurus lithophilus spawns in shallow, rocky areas around midnight. It synchronises it's spawning nights with a larger relative, the giant Lake Biwa catfish Silurus biwaensis, but avoids competition for spawning sites with it by spawning away from S. biwaensis, or spawning after S. biwaensis has left the spawning sites. It is thought spawning on the same nights as S. biwaensis reduces predation on S. lithophilus eggs. Unlike most catfishes, the eggs of Silurus lithophilus are non-adhesive.
