= World Freshwater Aquarium Aquatotto Gifu =

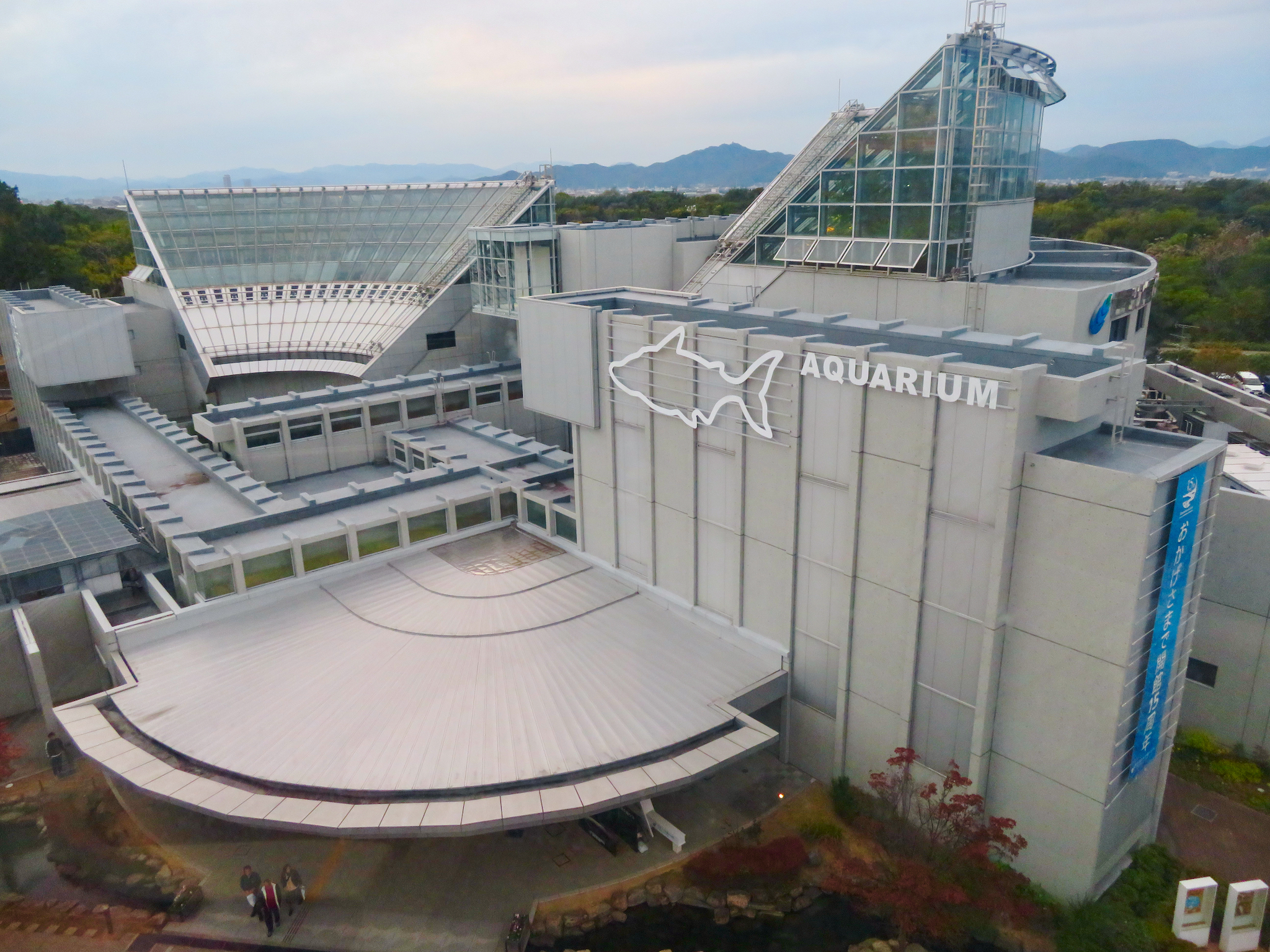
- Exterior of World Freshwater Aquarium
- Interactive map of World Freshwater Aquarium Aquatotto Gifu
- 35.3717°N 136.8105°E
- Date opened: 14 July 2004
- Location: Kakamigahara, Gifu, Japan
- Land area: 8,411 m^{2} (90,540 sq ft)
- No. of animals: 22,000
- No. of species: 250
- Annual visitors: 500,000
- Memberships: JAZA
- Major exhibits: Mekong River Area; Amazon River Area
- Management: Enoshima Marine Corporation
- Website: aquatotto.com

The World Freshwater Aquarium (世界淡水魚園水族館, Sekai tansuigyo en Suizokukan) is a Public aquarium located in Kawashima Kasada-cho, Kakamigahara City, Gifu Prefecture, Japan. It is nicknamed Aquatotto Gifu (アクアトト・ぎふ). It is an inland aquarium, opened on July 14, 2004, and is the largest freshwater aquarium in Japan. The aquarium is accredited as a Museum-equivalent facilities by the Museum Act from Ministry of Education, Culture, Sports, Science and Technology.

== History ==
Aquatotto Gifu is one of the Japan's largest aquariums specializing in freshwater fish, and when combined with the aforementioned River Environment Paradise and surrounding research facilities, it forms "the world's only and largest river environment learning zone.

The aquarium was established by the Gifu Prefecture, but the management of the aquarium was entrusted to Enoshima Marine Corporation, the management company of the former Enoshima Aquarium, which closed in 2003, and the company's chairman, Yukiko Hori, who has certain ties to Gifu Prefecture, is the sister of Takao Fujii, Heigo Fujii's daughter. Director of the Japan Association of Zoos and Aquariums, and Director of the Enoshima Aquarium) serves as honorary director.

The concept of the museum is "a place where children and adults can enjoy learning and thinking about the natural environment and river environment of Gifu Prefecture as a place for practicing environmental education and as a regional exchange center, as well as a facility with healing effects. Prior to the opening of the facility, a nationwide contest was held to select a nickname for the facility, and after a selection process of nearly 5,000 entries, a fourth grader's idea from Ogaki City was selected as the grand prize winner and chosen as the "Aqua Totto Gifu". The name was chosen because it is easy to remember and familiar, even though "aqua" and "totto" are infant words meaning "water" and "fish," respectively.

The World Freshwater Aquarium signed a Declaration of Friendship with the Tennessee Aquarium in Chattanooga.

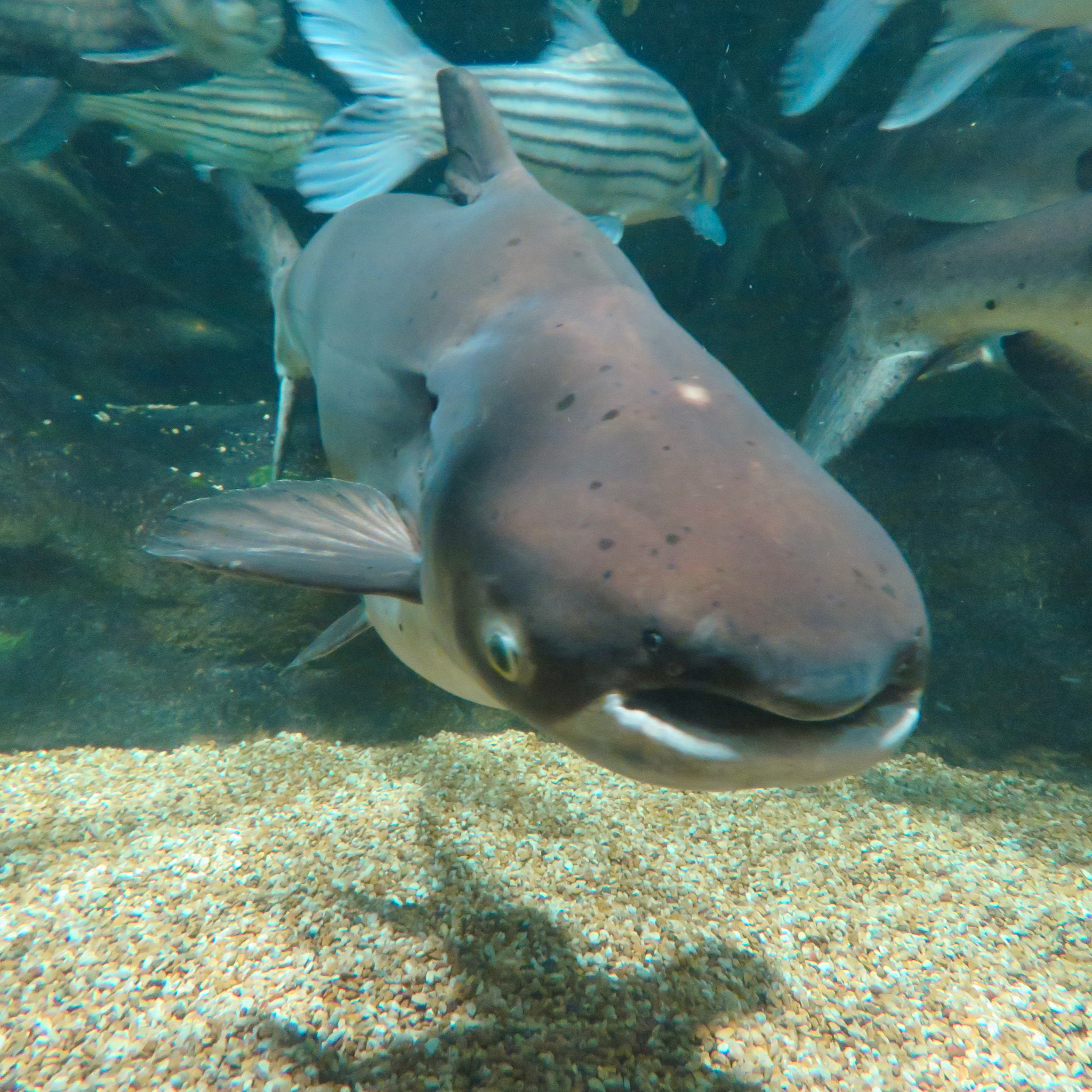
Mekong giant catfish

The aquarium has about 220 species of animals (arthropods and vertebrates) and about 30 species of plants (about 2,000 items) on display. The most popular exhibits include the Mekong giant catfish, Giant freshwater stingray, otter, and capybara.

The number of annual visitors to the museum was approximately 747,000 in 2004 (the first year of its opening) and 506,000 in 2005 (the second year of its opening), and has been hovering around the 400,000 mark since, but recovered to the 500,000 mark in 2014 (2014), with 500,044 visitors. 45.4%, Gifu Prefecture 26.8%, and Mie Prefecture 11.6%, with the three Tokai prefectures accounting for over 80%.

In 2018, the park was certified as a "Rare Species Conservation Zoo and Botanical Garden" by the Minister of the Environment for the first time in Japan (No. 1 certification), along with Toyama City Family Park in Toyama City, Toyama Prefecture. The term is for five years.

The park is registered as a Gifu Prefecture Machikado Art Museum and Museum.

=== Timeline ===
- 1999
  - The Gifu World Freshwater Fish Park (nicknamed "Oasis Park") was opened.
- 2002
  - October: Construction of the Aqua Toto Gifu World Freshwater Fish Park Aquarium (nicknamed "Aqua Toto Gifu") began within the Gifu World Freshwater Fish Park.
- 2004
  - March : Construction of the aquarium was completed. July 14: The aquarium's nickname, "Aqua Toto Gifu," was chosen from a nationwide public contest.
  - July 14: Aqua Toto Gifu opens under the management and operation of Enoshima Marine Corporation under the designated manager system.
- 2005
  - March 24: Birth of a female small-clawed otter.
  - July 8: Aldabra giant tortoise exhibition begins.
  - August 1: A designated manager system is introduced for the entire World Freshwater Fish Park (Oasis Park), a comprehensive facility consisting of an aquarium, waterways, a Ferris wheel, convenience stores, and other facilities.
  - August 15: The number of visitors to the aquarium reaches 1 million since its opening.
- 2006
  - January 18: A male and female otter were born.
  - March 31: The number of visitors to the aquarium reached 506,194 for the 2005 fiscal year.
  - April 22: Public rehearsals for the sea lion show began.
  - July 14: Sea lion show begins.
  - October 4 : The number of visitors reached 1.5 million since its opening.
  - Unknown date: The museum receives the "Breeding Award" from the Japanese Association of Zoos and Aquariums for the breeding success of the Lethenteron reissneri.
- 2008
  - March 2: The number of visitors reached 2 million since its opening.
  - March 20 : Capybara exhibit begins.
  - March. 31 : The number of visitors in FY2007 (fiscal year 2007) was 369,240 (the lowest number until FY2014).
  - December. 6: The number of visitors to the sea lion show reached 500,000 since its first show.
- 2009
  - March. 31 : The number of visitors to the aquarium reached 406,427 for the fiscal year 2008.
  - September 25, 2009: The museum received the "Breeding Award" from the Japanese Association of Zoos and Aquariums for its breeding success of the black salamander.
- 2010
  - March 31, 2010 : The number of visitors in FY2009 was 431,151.
  - June 4 : Part of the 3rd and 4th floors were renovated.
  - June 11: The museum received the "Breeding Award" from the Japanese Association of Zoos and Aquariums for the breeding success of the mountain red-legged frog and the nagare toad.
- 2011
  - March 31, 2011 : The number of visitors to the aquarium in FY2010 was 418,620.
  - September 2, 2011: The aquarium was awarded the "Breeding Prize" by the Japanese Association of Zoos and Aquariums for its achievements in the breeding of the Japanese freshwater crab.
- 2012
  - March 31: The number of visitors to the aquarium in FY2011 was 419,447.
  - December: Began exhibiting giant tortoise (transferred from Kobe Oji Zoo).
- 2018
  - September 14: Began exhibiting Silurus tomodai, which was announced as a new species in August of the same year.
- 2021
  - November: will be suspended. However, training is continued as part of the sea lion's health management, and is open to the public as training time.
- 2022
  - May 17: Due to the aging of the sea lions, the sea lion show, which had been temporarily suspended since
- 2023
  - February 28: Training time is suspended and the public is closed to the public due to the aging of the sea lions.
  - October 3: The southern American fur seal (bred privately) is moved to Tobu Zoo for a breeding loan.

== Research and conservation ==
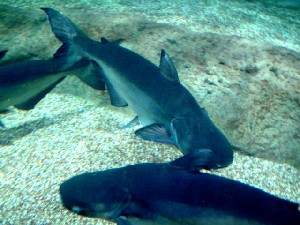
Mekong giant catfish when the aquarium first opened

The aquarium has been focusing its research efforts on the Mekong giant catfish, and based on 13 years of observation records, the aquarium has found that the Mekong giant catfish has the physiological ability to endure long periods of fasting, which can last up to one year, and that it maintains a periodic cycle that matches the local dry and rainy seasons.

The paper was published in the electronic edition of Ichthyological Research, an English-language journal of the Ichthyological Society of Japan.

The aquarium has also organized a Mekong giant catfish scientific research committee with academic experts to report on research and raise public awareness, and holds an annual meeting to exchange information on the habitat and findings from observations in the aquarium.

Researchers, university students, and aquarium staff have conducted distribution surveys as part of joint research, and in the past have held hands-on learning programs, held a symposium on the conservation of Pseudorasbora pugnax, which is considered a rare species in Gifu Prefecture, and displayed Onychodactylus pyrrhonotus, which was newly described as a species in February 2022.

The Minister of the Environment presented him with the "Wildlife Conservation Merit Award" for his efforts to conserve endangered species such as Deepbody bitterling and Hynobius abei, which are listed on the Red List as Endangered species.

Also cooperation with the Gifu Prefectural Fisheries Research Institute, the "River Environment Paradise Environmental Education Network" was established in 2005 to conduct environmental education activities.

== Exhibits ==
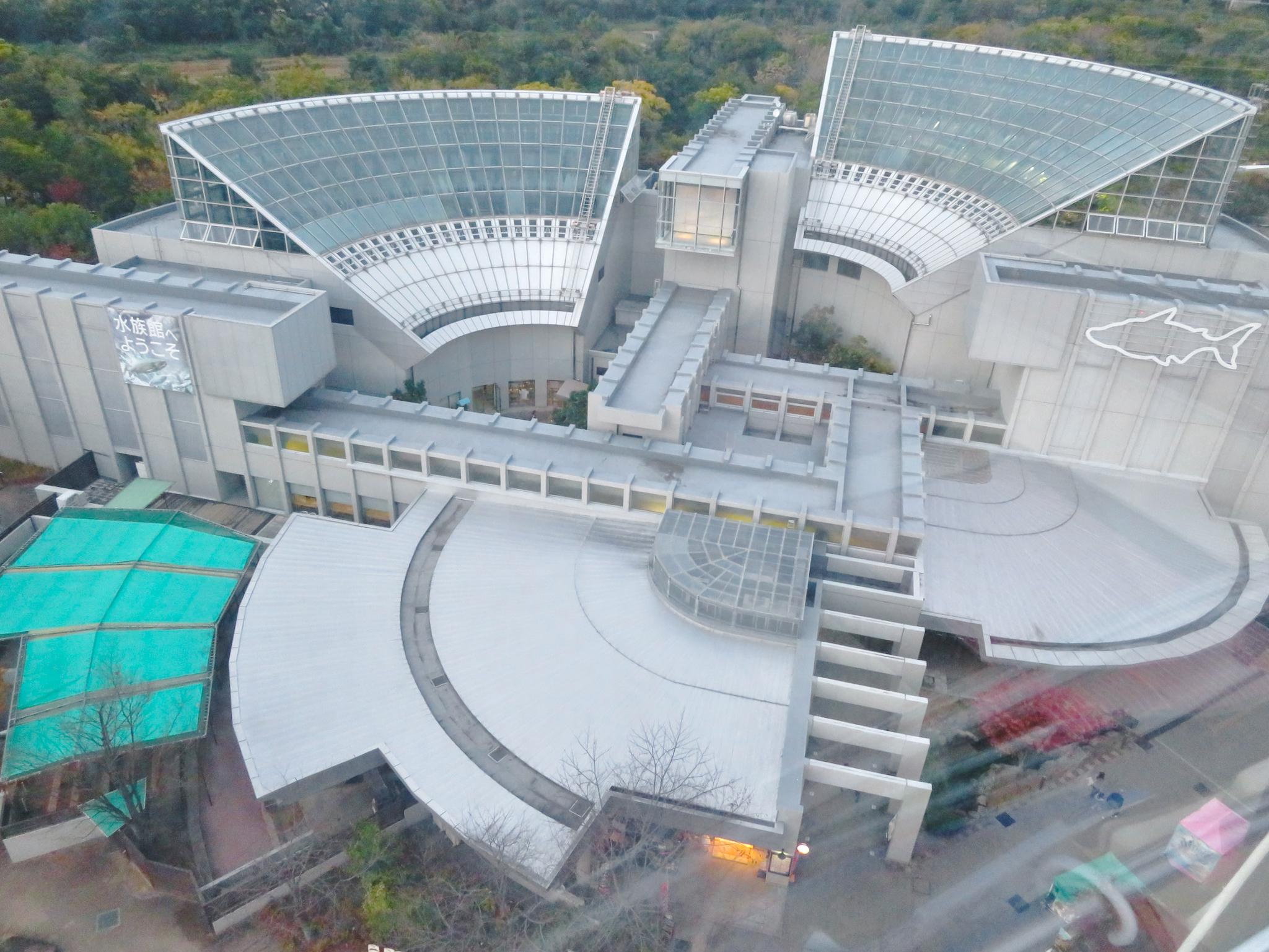
building seen from above

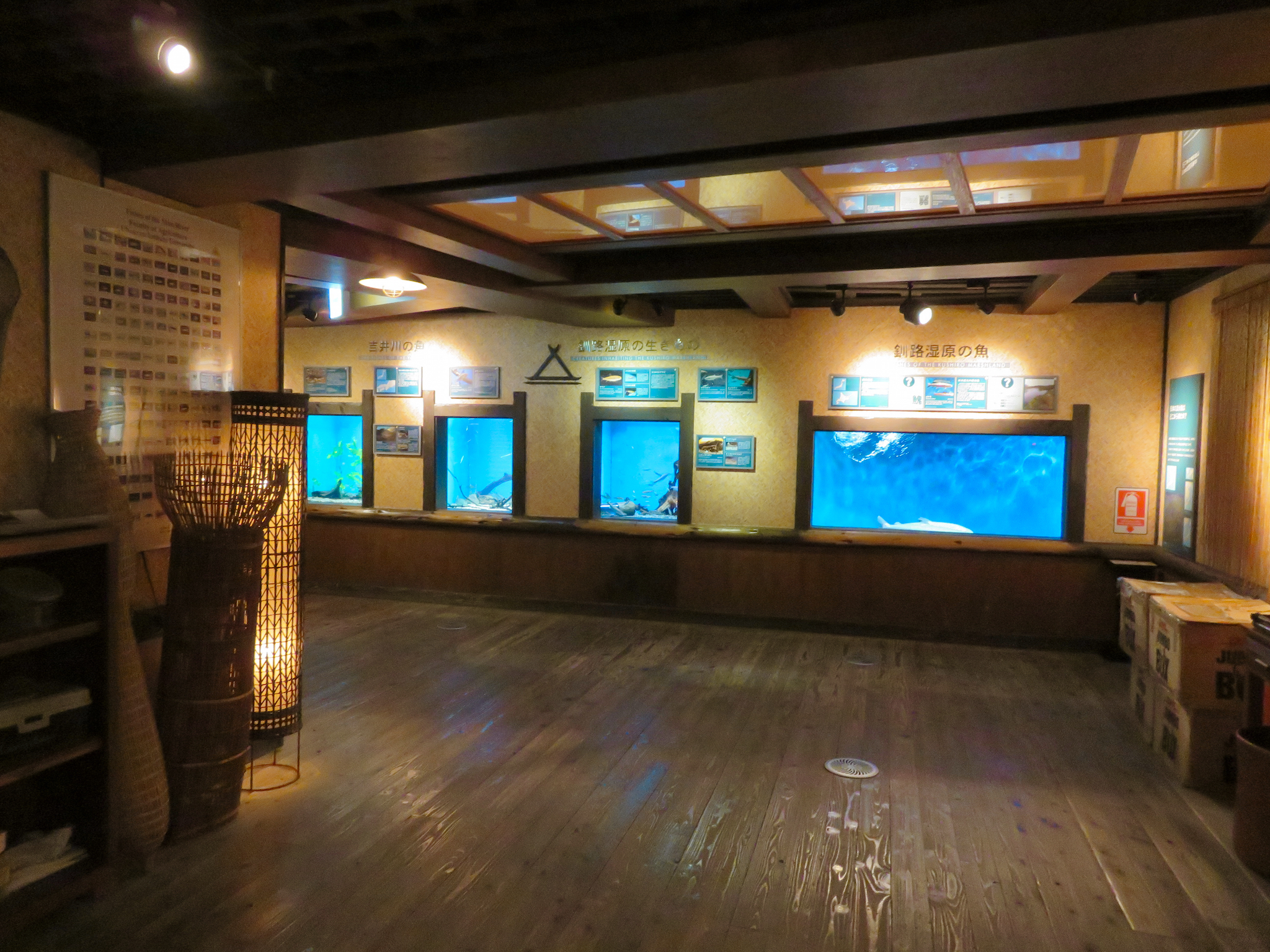
Interior

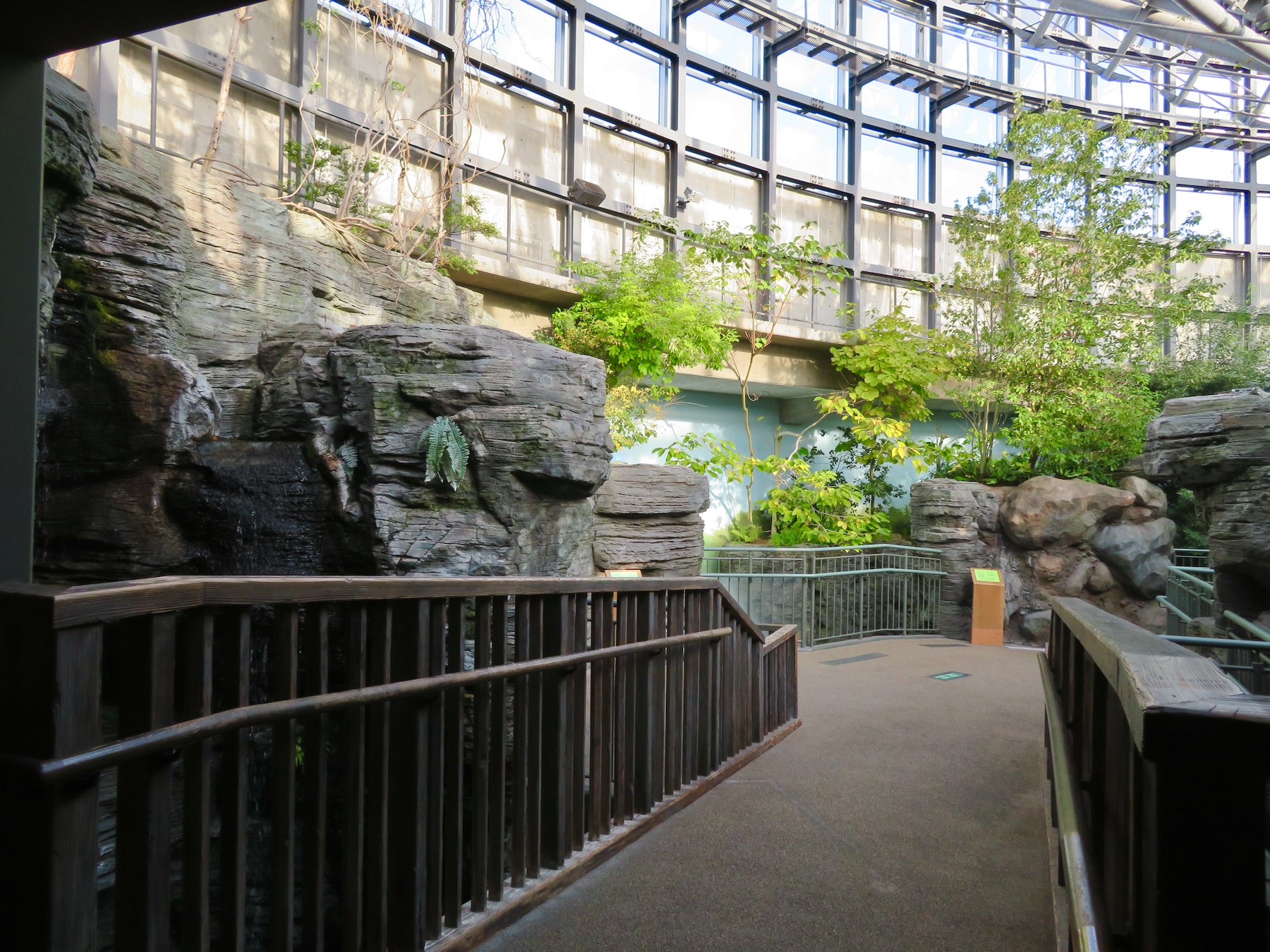
Botanical garden

- 4th floor
  - Nagara River headwaters area
- 3rd floor
  - Upstream to midstream area of the Nagara River
  - Nagara River downstream area
- Second floor
  - Aquatic insects living in Gifu and Satoyama creatures aquarium
  - Freshwater fish doctor's exploration hut
  - Scientists are conducting environmental research on the Mekong River on the banks of the Mekong River.
  - Mekong River Area
  - Lake Tanganyika area
- 1st floor
  - Amazon River Area
  - Special exhibition space
  - Giant Tortoise Plaza
  - Capybara Terrace
  - Outdoor stage
  - Clear stream contact pool
  - Fish area that inhabits the Nagara River
  - Entrance hall
  - Theme aquarium
  - Toto Lab
  - Multipurpose hall
  - AROWANA GARDEN (cafe/restaurant)
  - Fish Tank (Museum Shop)

== Gallery ==
Exterior

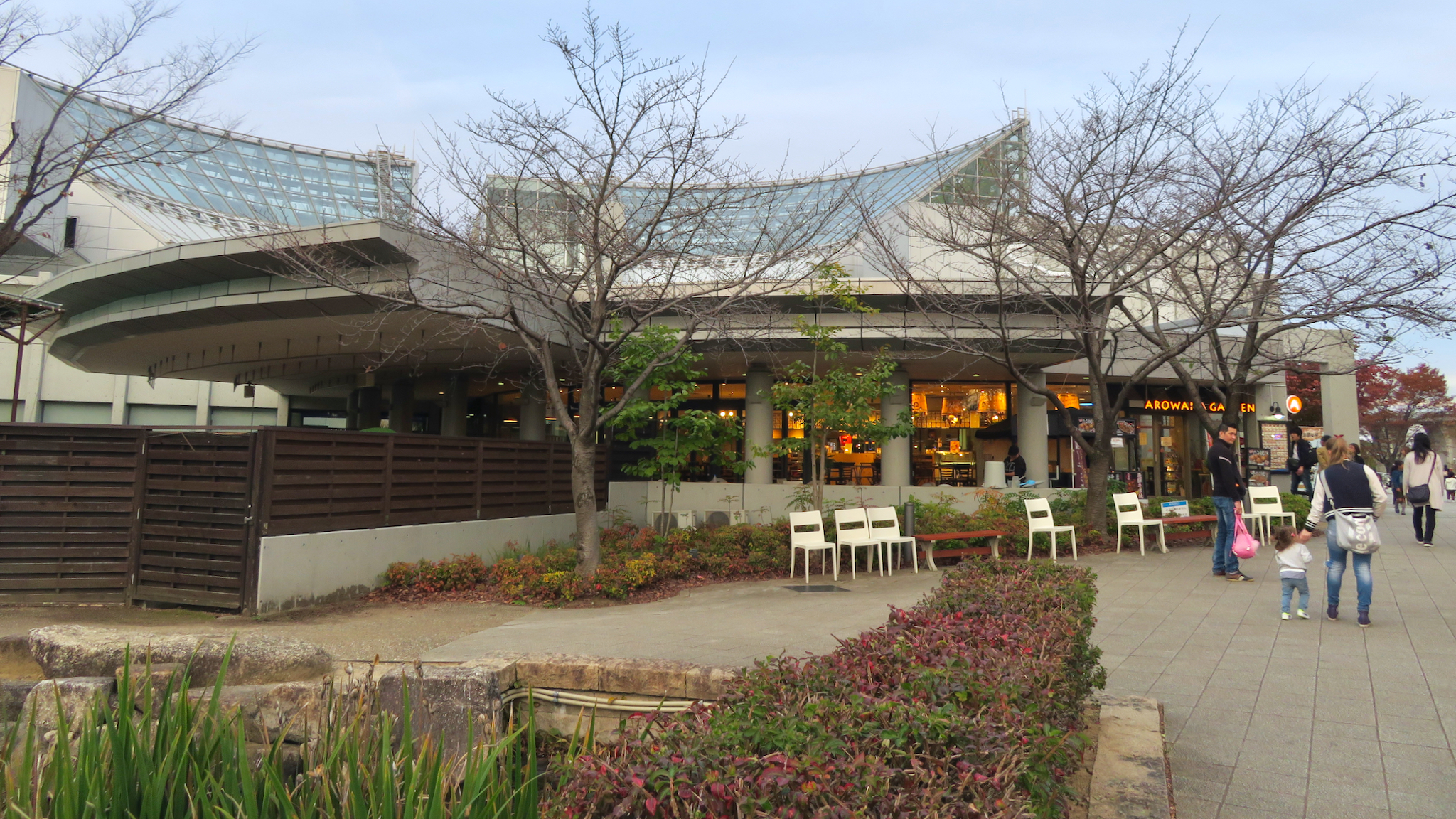

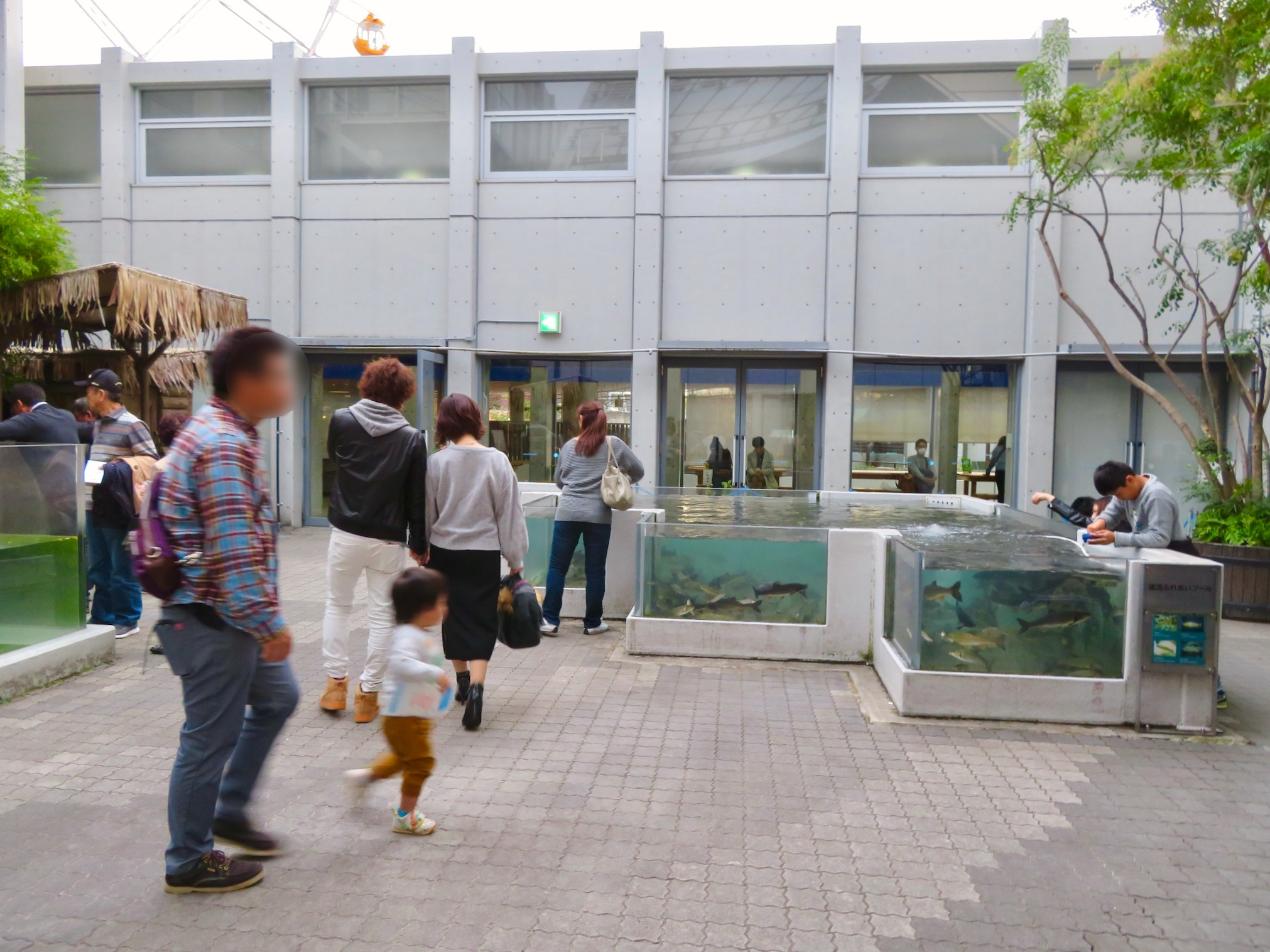

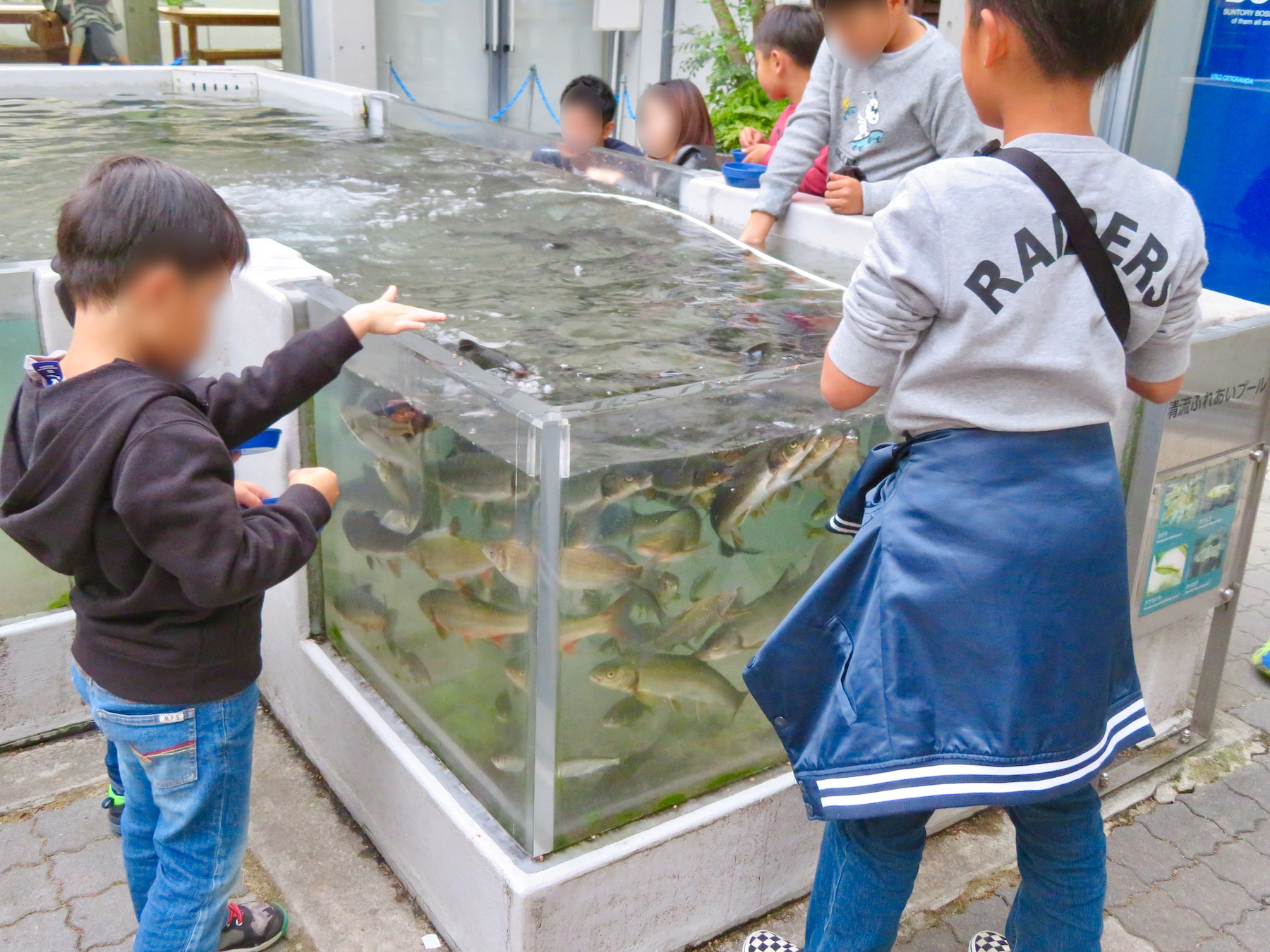

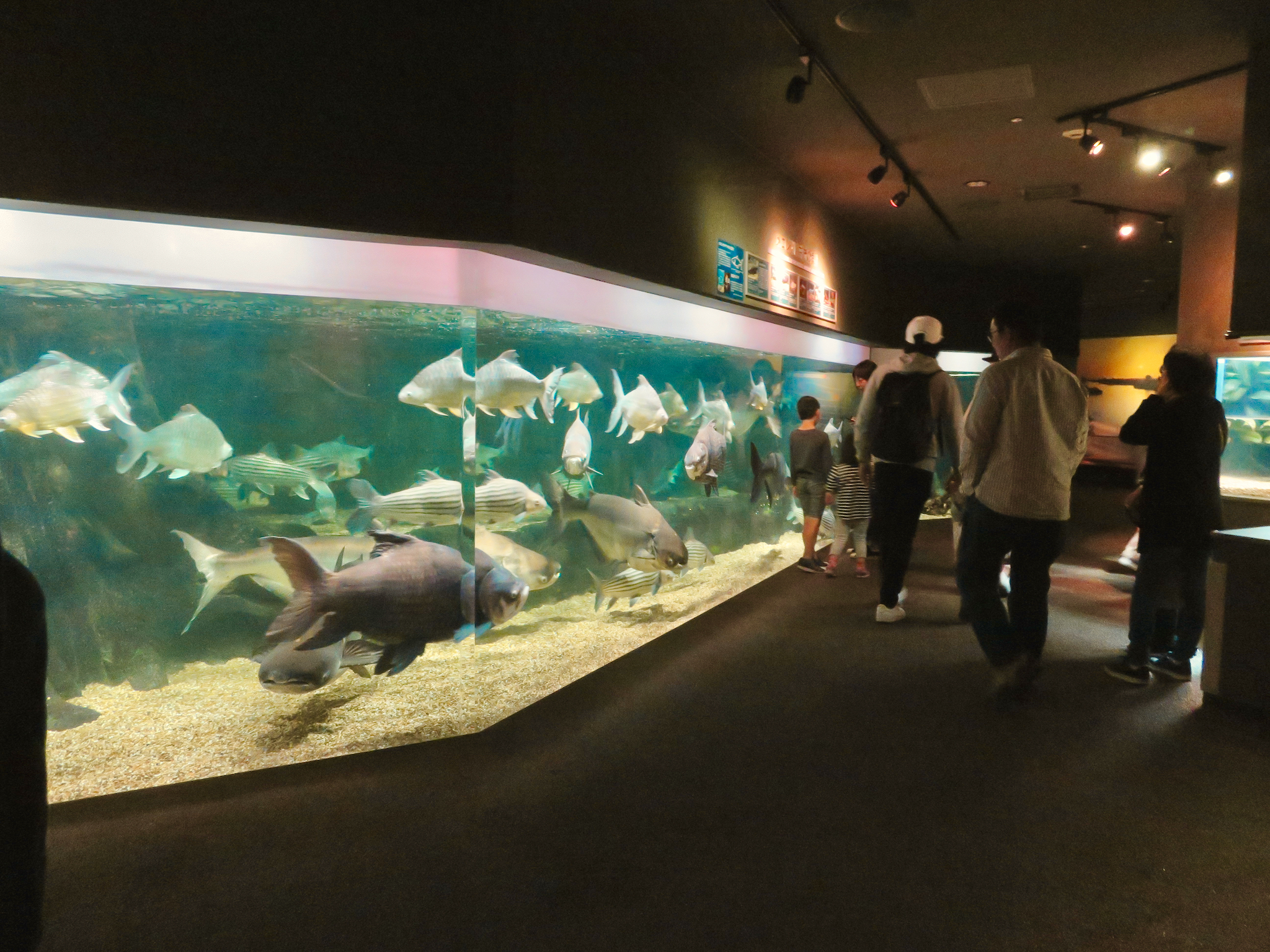

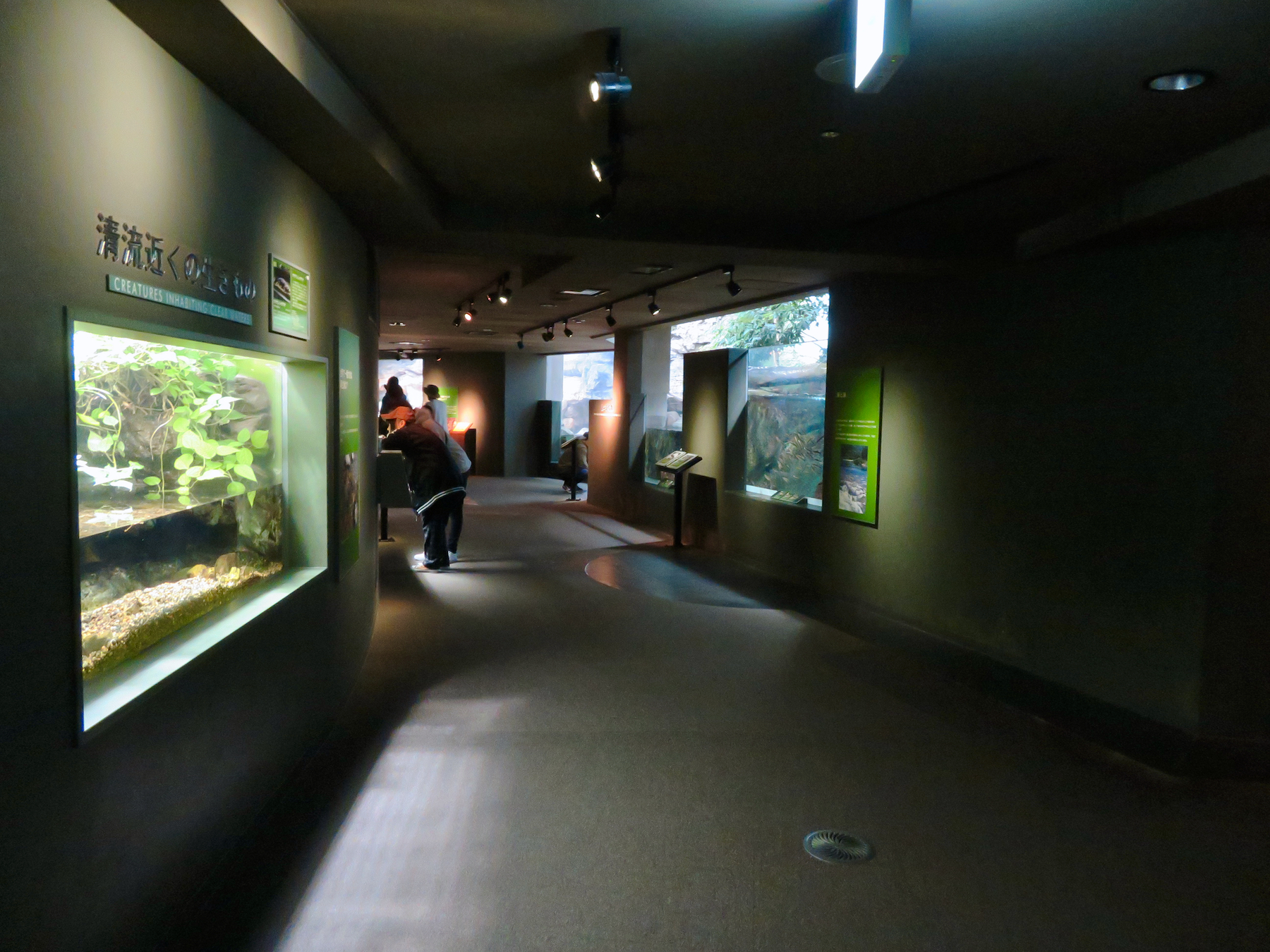

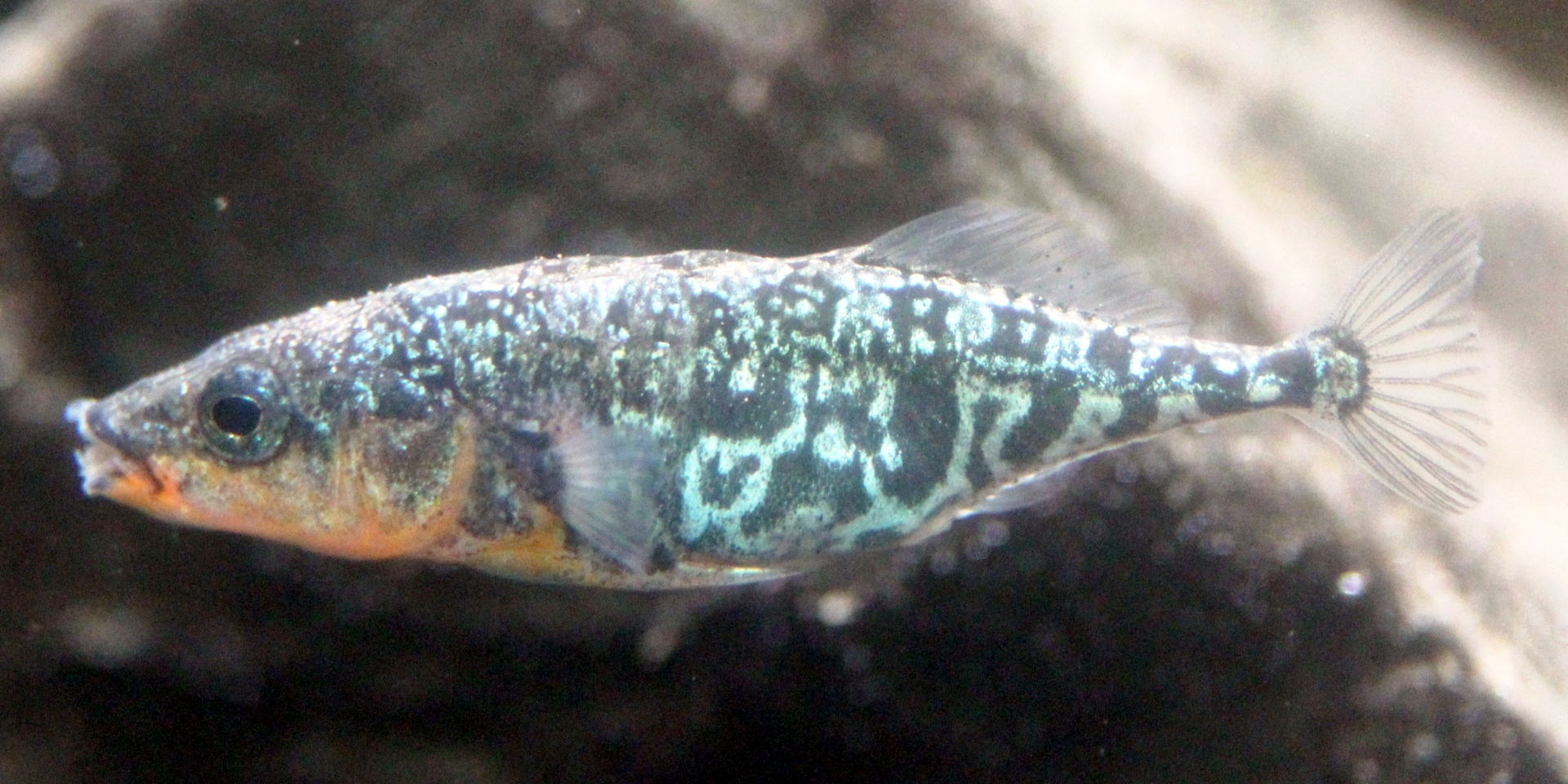

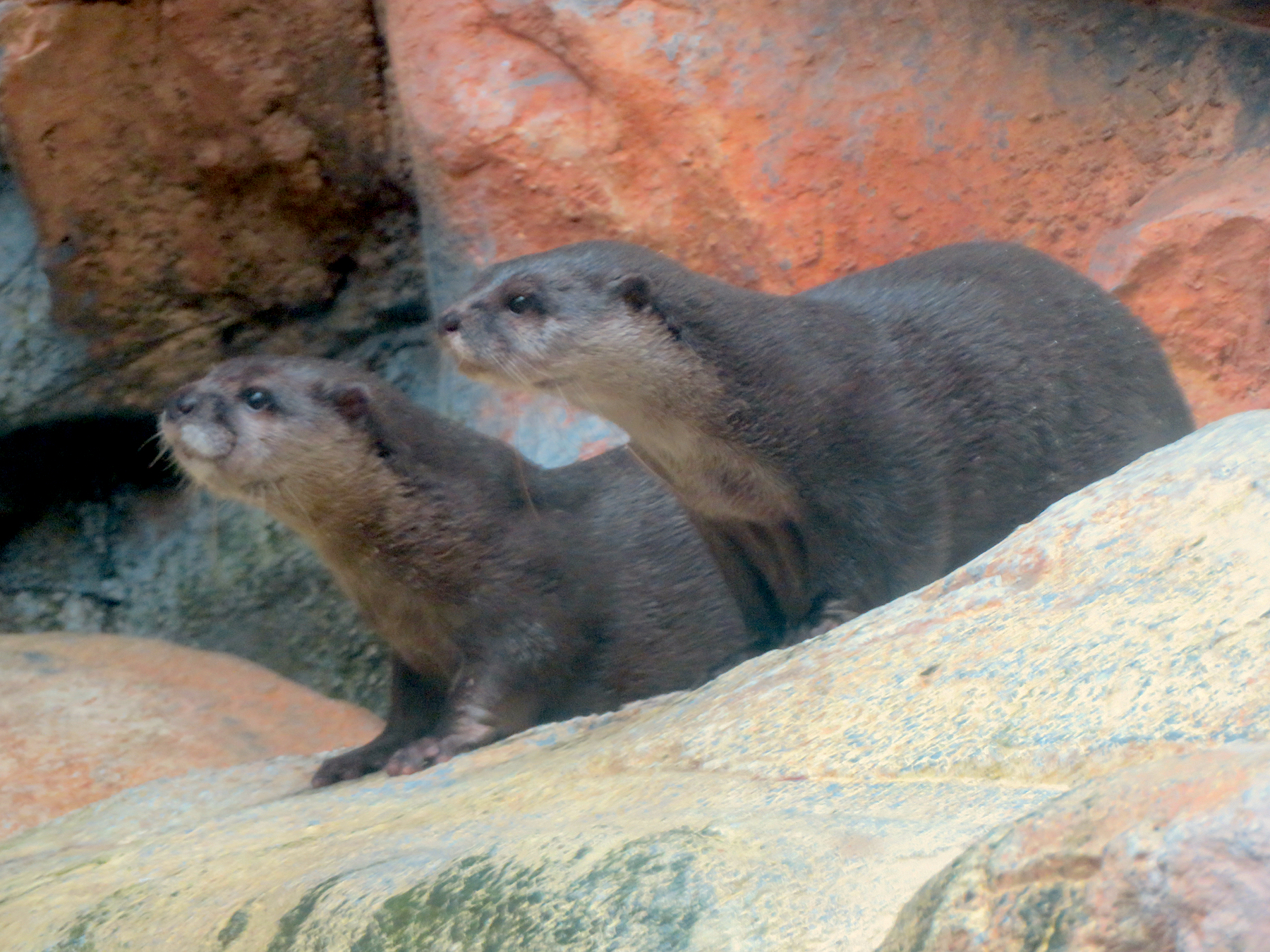

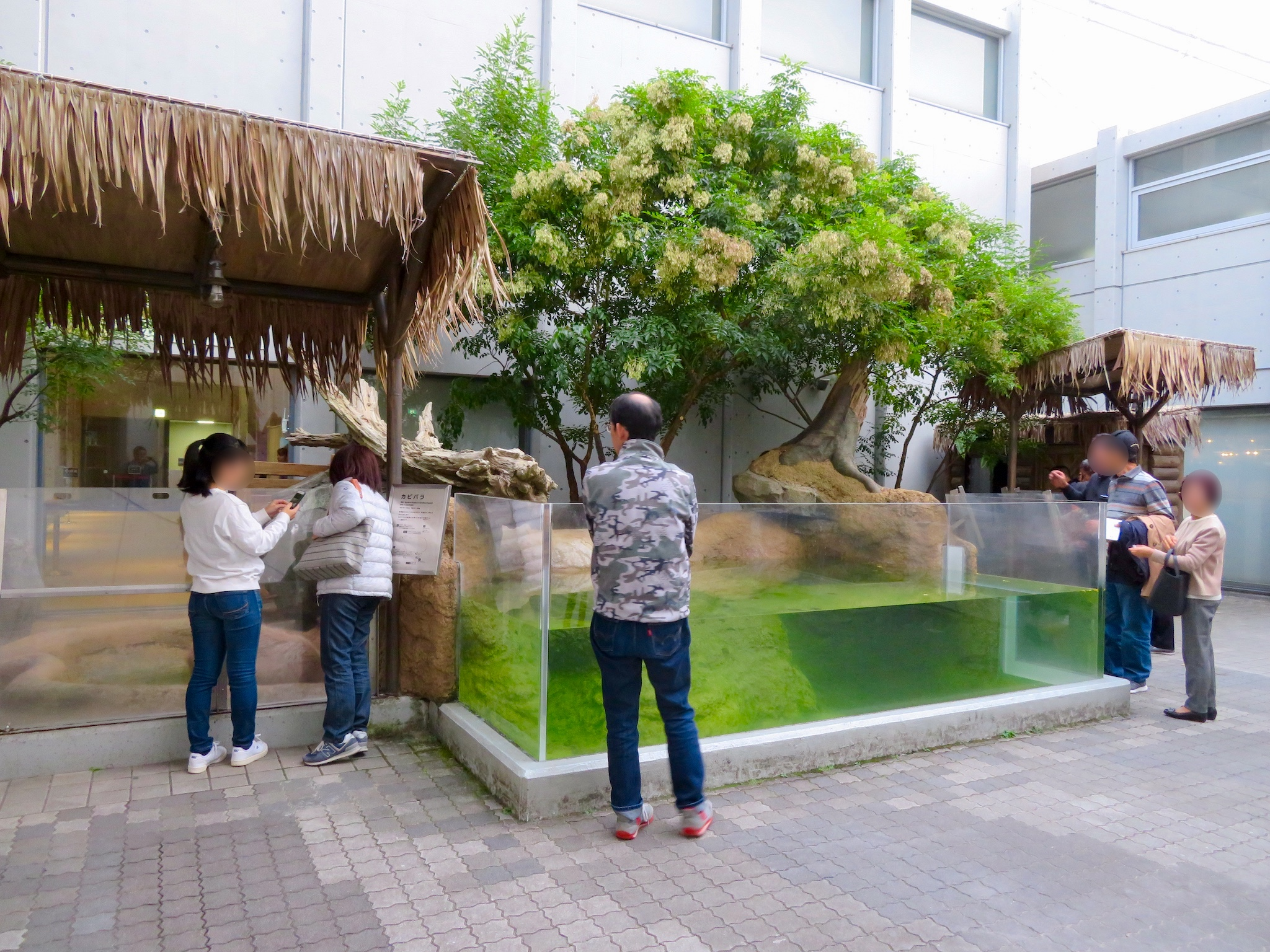

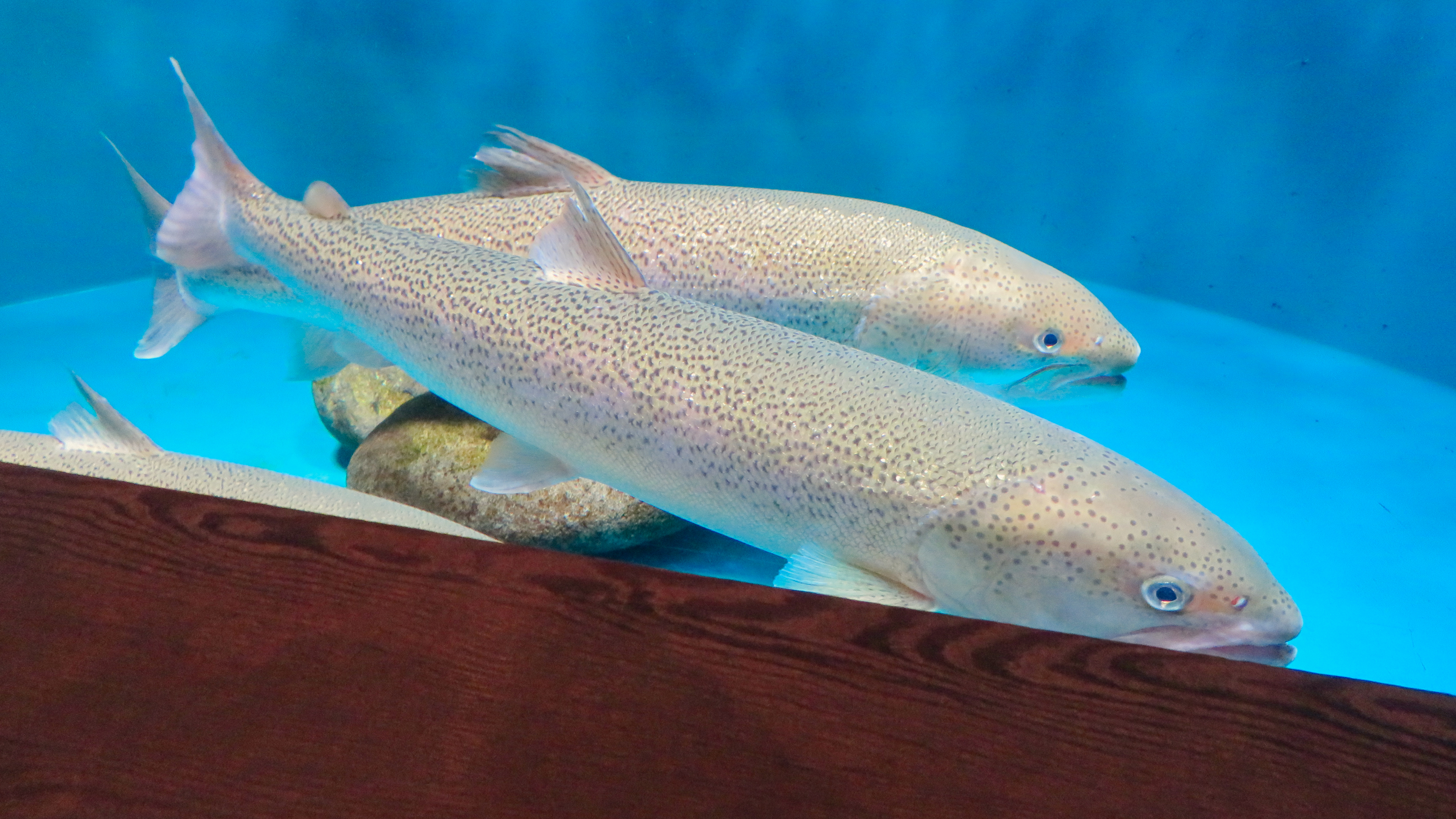

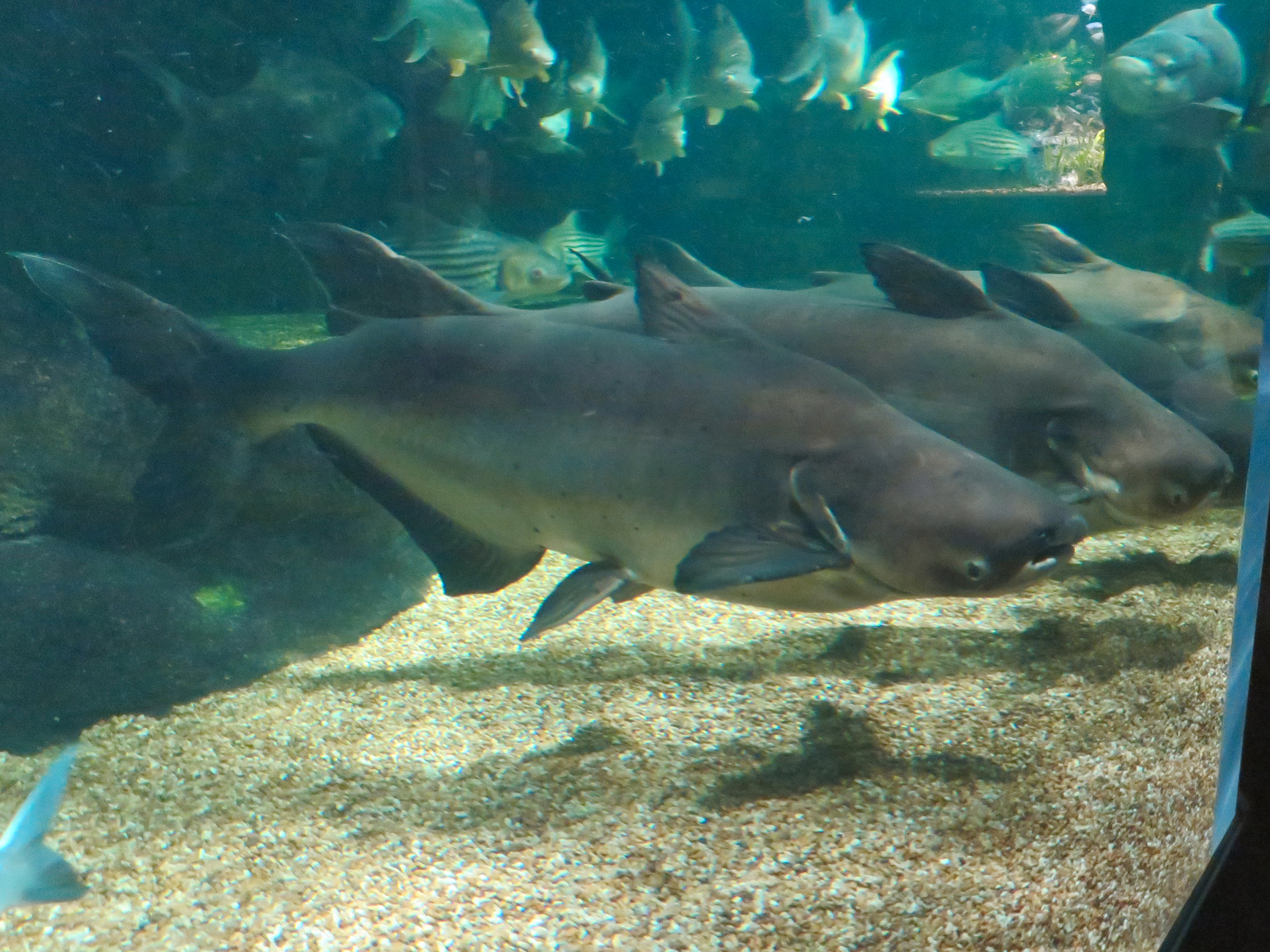

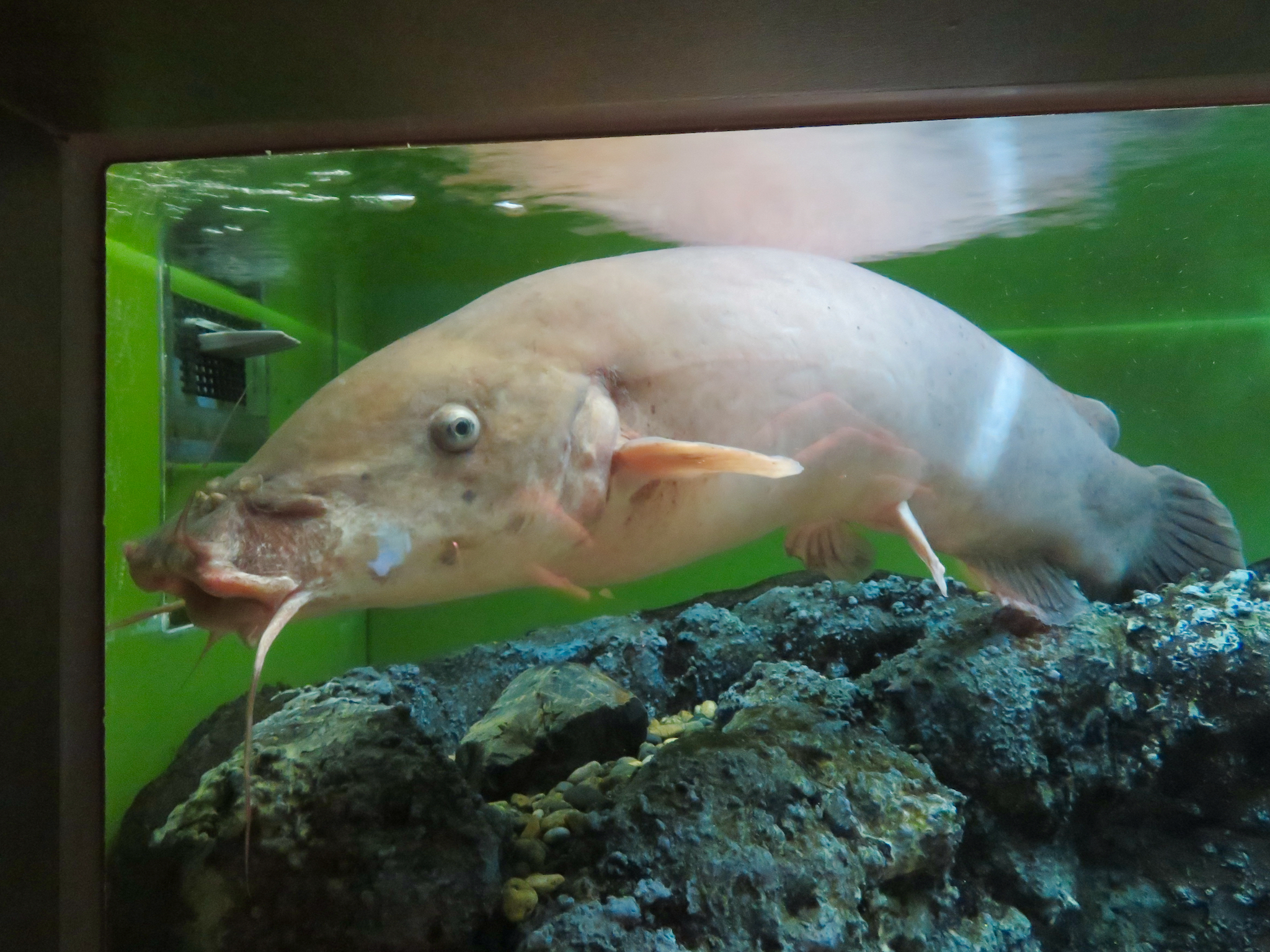

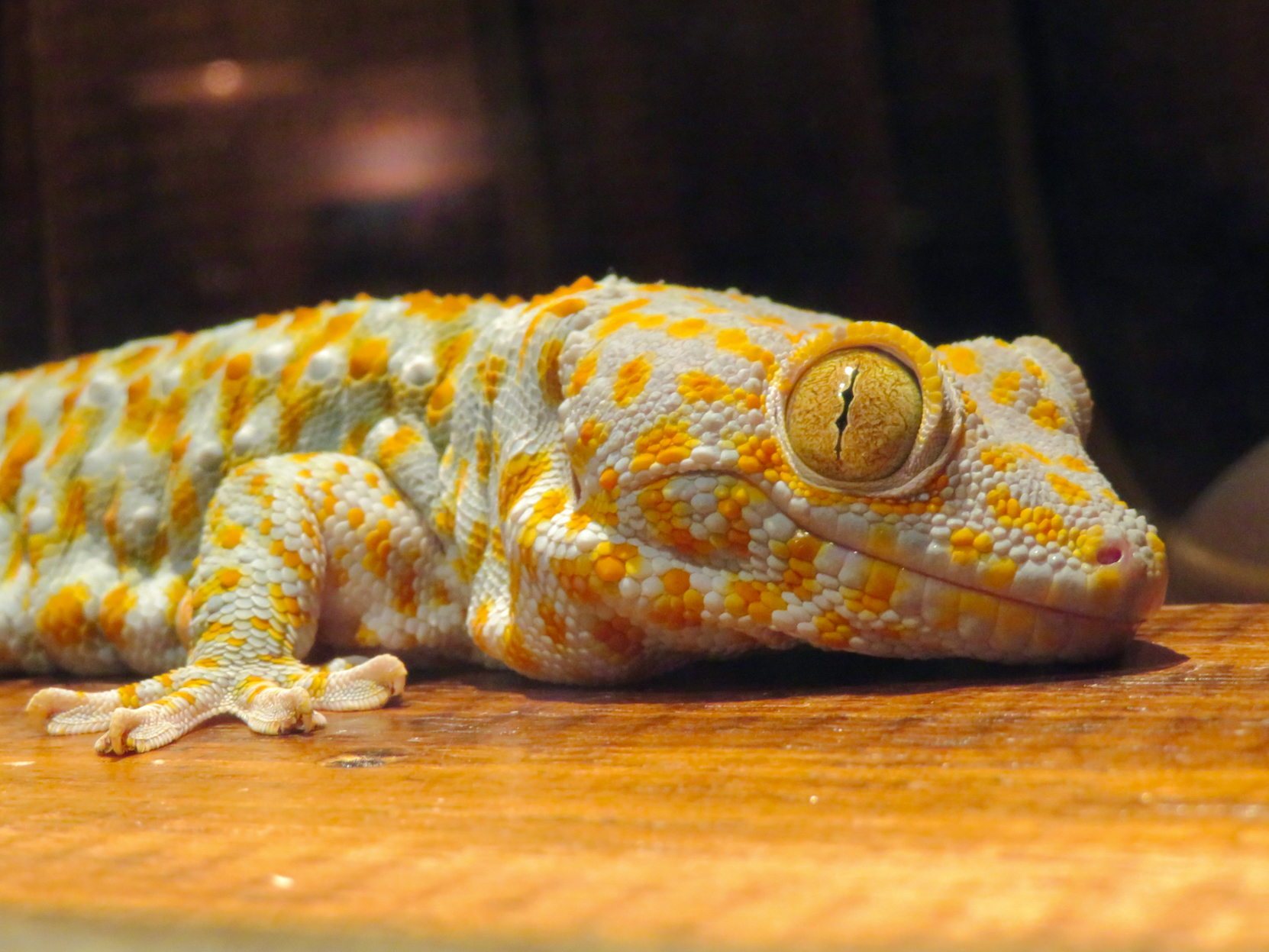

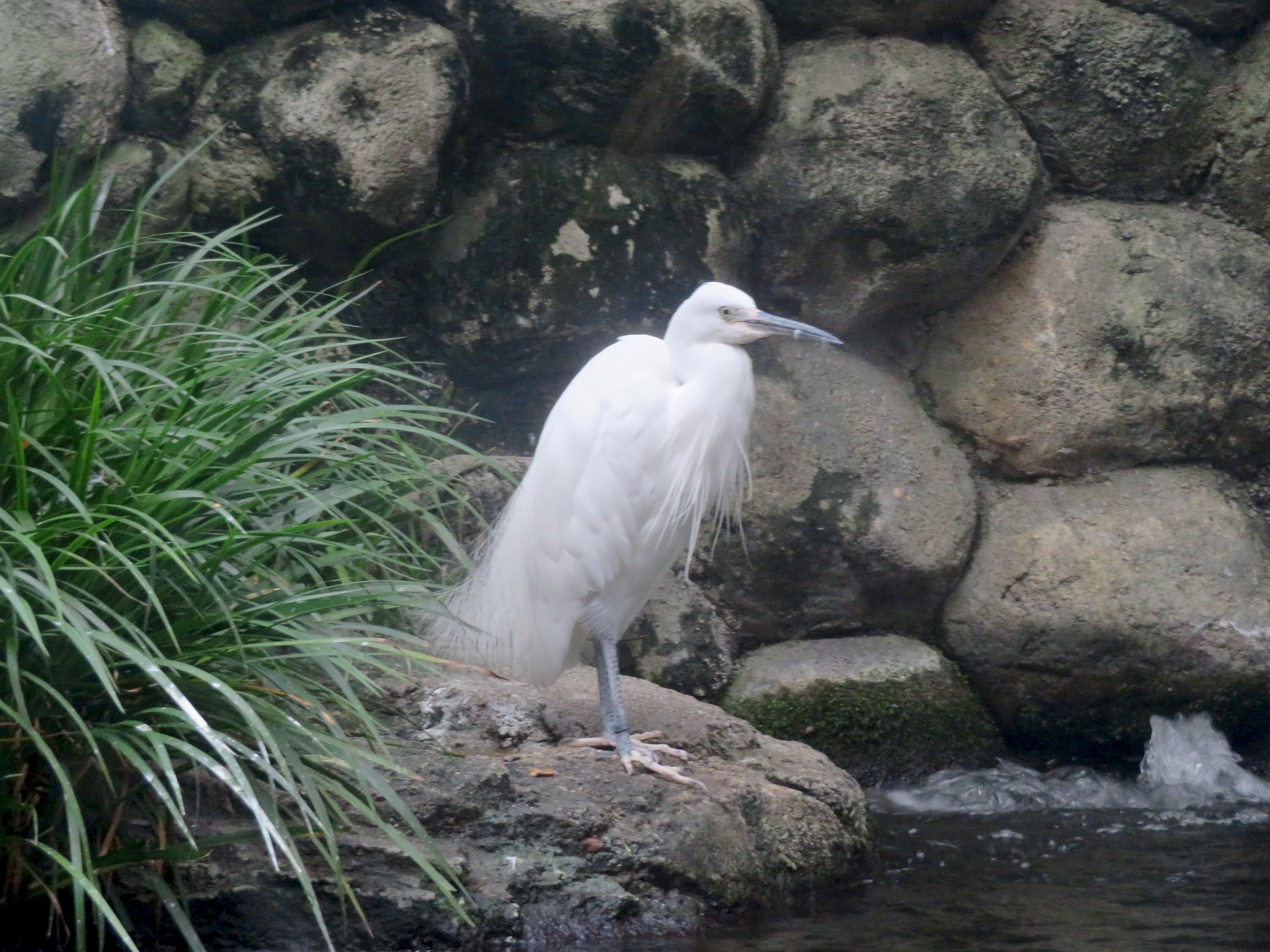

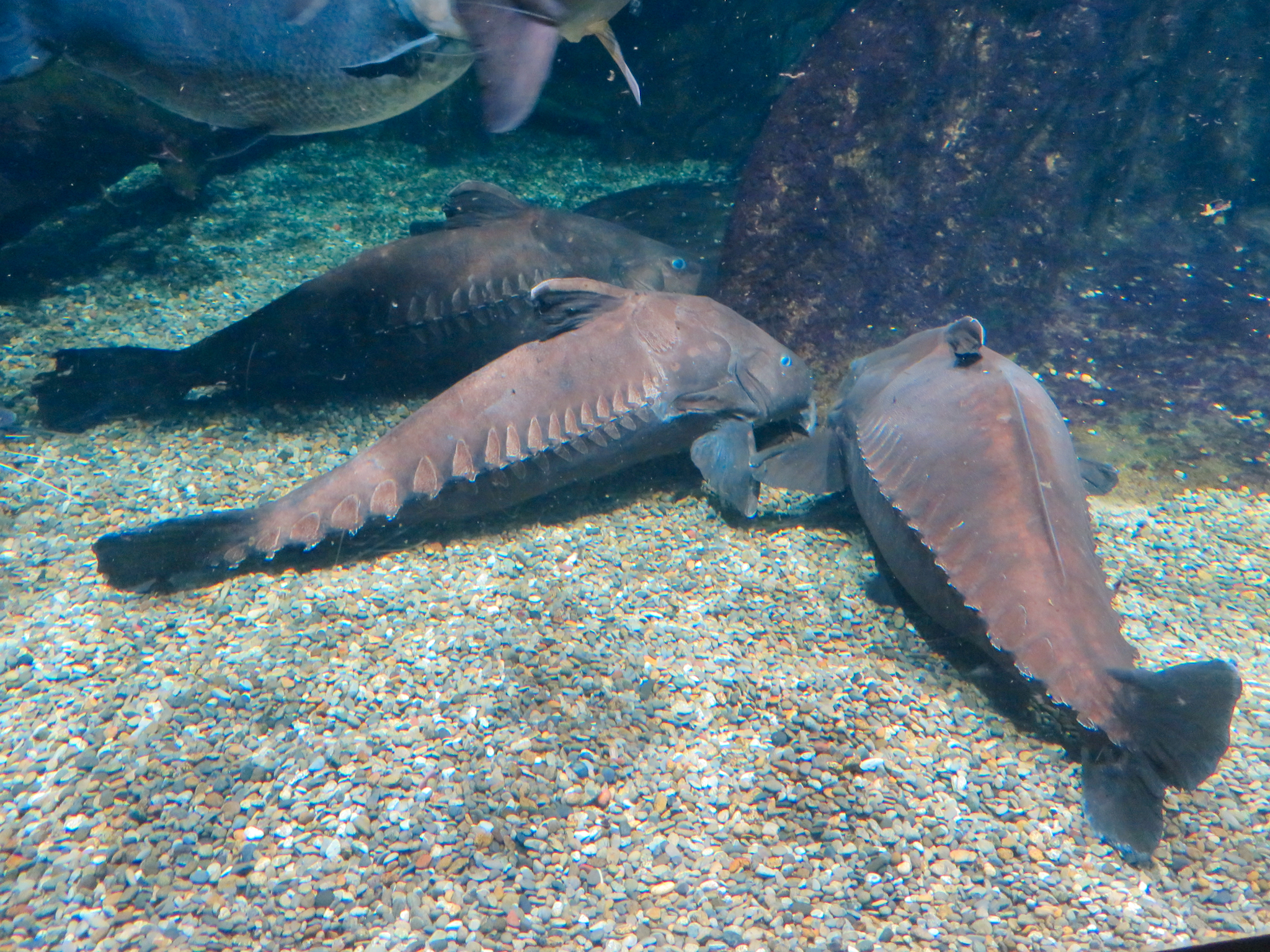

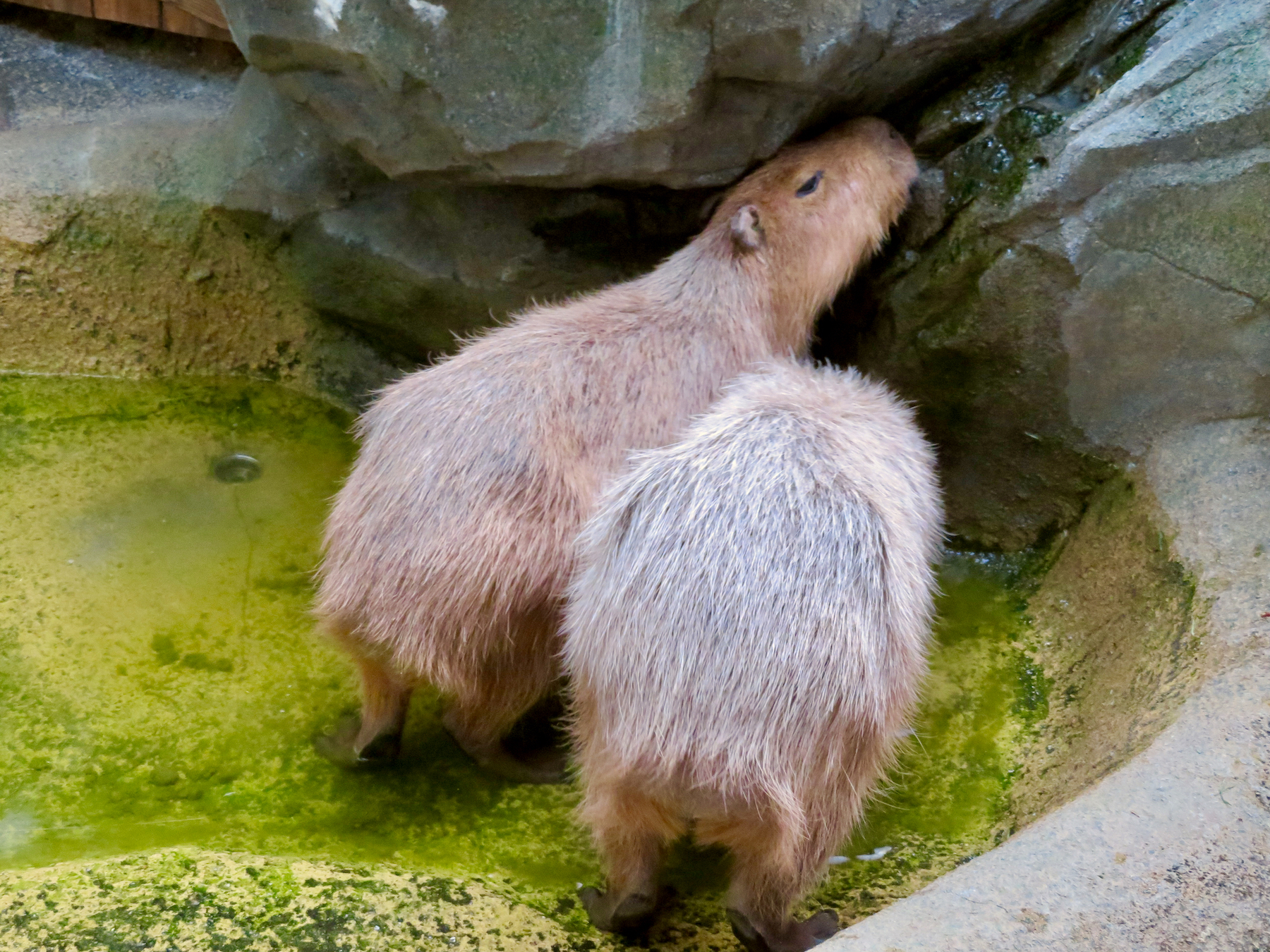

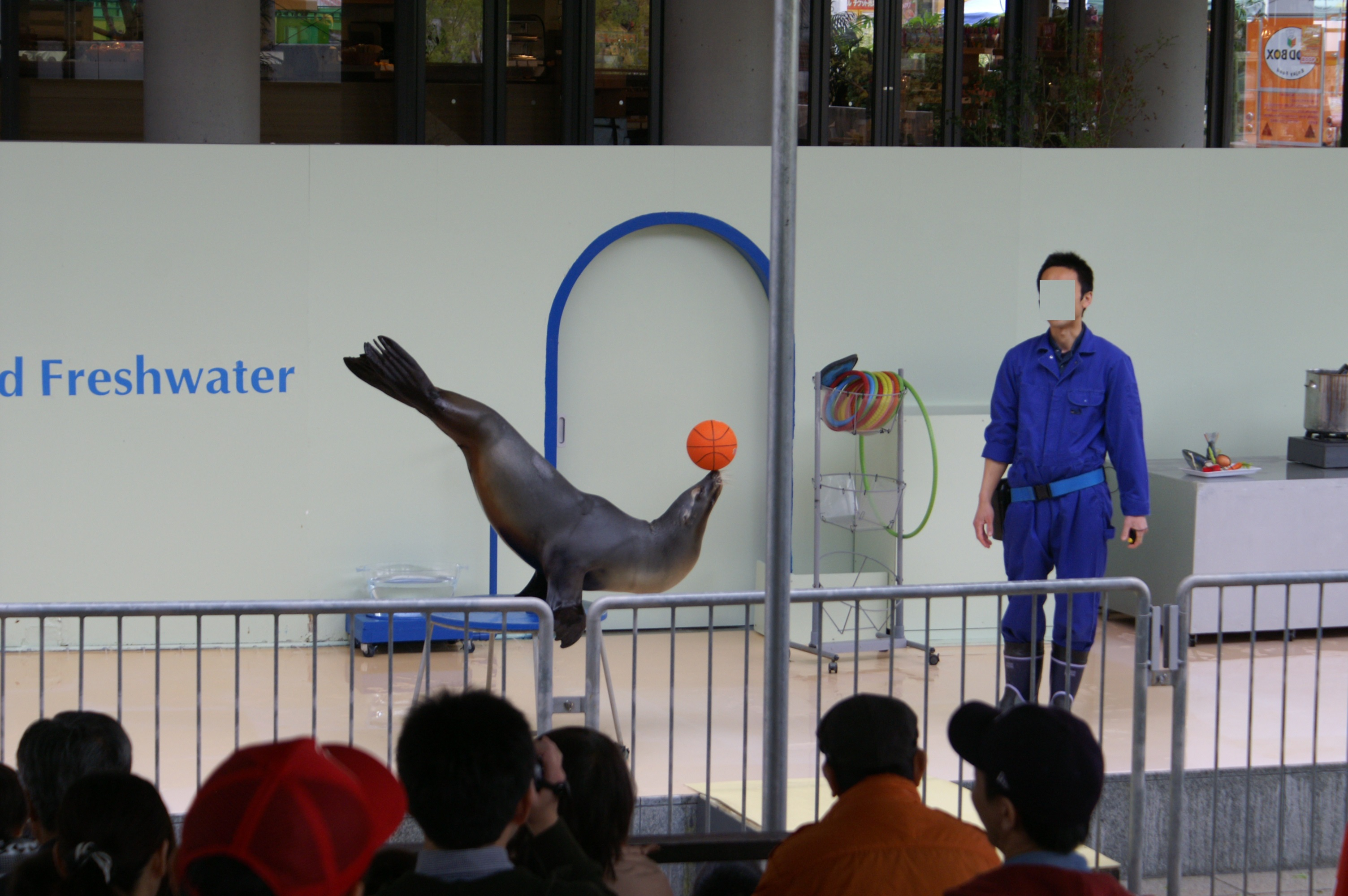
