= Yellow catfish =

A variety of fish species are referred to as the yellow catfish, including:

== North America ==
- Ameiurus natalis, also called the "yellow bullhead"
- Pylodictis olivaris, also called the "flathead catfish"

== Asia ==
- Hemibagrus nemurus
- Horabagrus brachysoma
- Mystus keletius
- Silurus caobangensis
- Tachysurus fulvidraco

== South America ==
- Pseudauchenipterus nodosus
