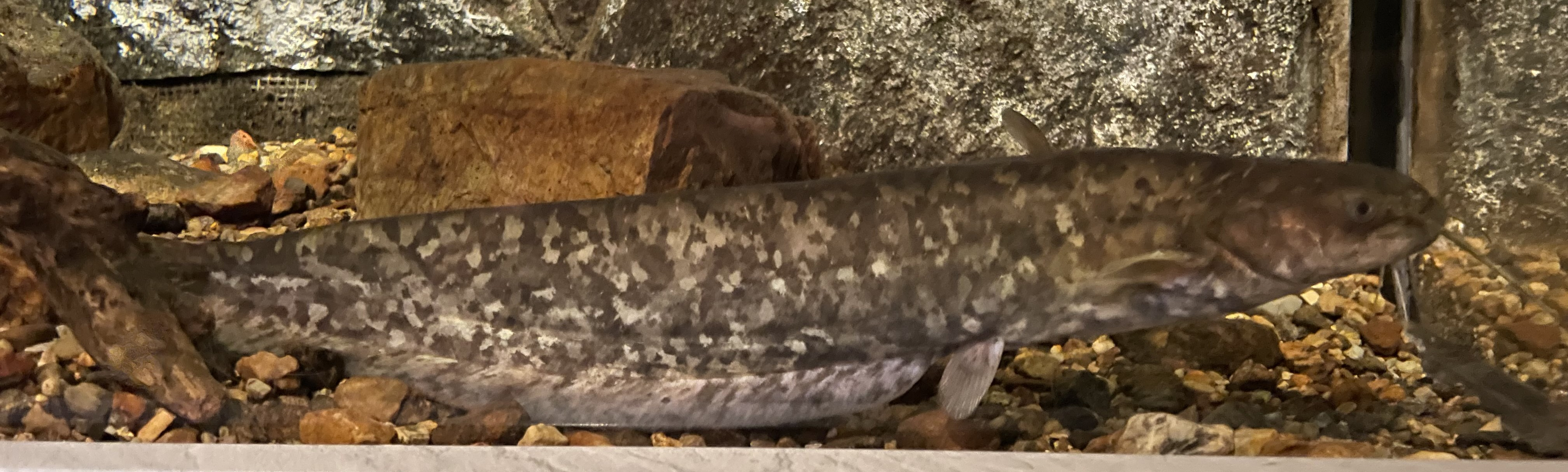

Scientific classification
- Domain: Eukaryota
- Kingdom: Animalia
- Phylum: Chordata
- Class: Actinopterygii
- Order: Siluriformes
- Family: Siluridae
- Genus: Silurus
- Species: S. tomodai

Binomial name
- Silurus tomodai Y. Hibino & Tabata, 2018

= Silurus tomodai =

Species of fish

Silurus tomodai is a species of catfish found in Japan.

This species reaches a length of 51.4 cm (20.2 in).

== Etymology ==
The fish is named in honor of Tomoda Katsuzo, a Japanese ichthyologist who contributed to the study of catfishes in Japan and who described Silurus biwaensis and Silurus lithophilus in 1961.
