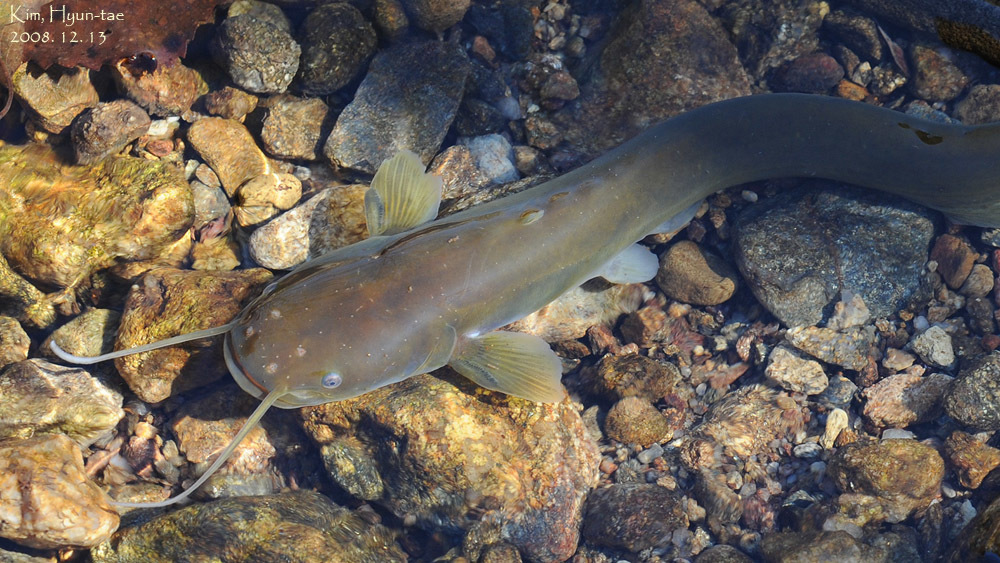

Scientific classification
- Domain: Eukaryota
- Kingdom: Animalia
- Phylum: Chordata
- Class: Actinopterygii
- Order: Siluriformes
- Family: Siluridae
- Genus: Silurus
- Species: S. microdorsalis

Binomial name
- Silurus microdorsalis (Mori, 1936)

Synonyms
- Parasilurus microdorsalis Mori, 1936

= Silurus microdorsalis =

Species of fish

Silurus microdorsalis, the slender catfish, is a species of catfish found in Asia, in the Yalu River in Korea and China.

== Description ==
This species reaches a length of 35.0 cm (13.8 in).

== Etymology ==
The fish's name means small dorsal fin in Latin.
