= Silurus duanensis =

Scientific classification
- Kingdom: Animalia
- Phylum: Chordata
- Class: Actinopterygii
- Order: Siluriformes
- Family: Siluridae
- Genus: Silurus
- Species: S. duanensis

Binomial name
- Silurus duanensis X. Y. Hu, J. H. Lan & C. G. Zhang, 2004

Species of fish

Silurus duanensis is a species of catfish found in China.

== Etymology ==
The fish is named in honor of Du’an County, Guangxi, China, where the fish is endemic.
