= Silurus grahami =

Conservation status
- Endangered (IUCN 3.1)

Scientific classification
- Kingdom: Animalia
- Phylum: Chordata
- Class: Actinopterygii
- Order: Siluriformes
- Family: Siluridae
- Genus: Silurus
- Species: S. grahami

Binomial name
- Silurus grahami Regan, 1907

Species of fish

Silurus grahami is an endangered species of catfish found in Asia and is endemic to Yunnan, China.

This species reaches a length of 42.6 cm (16.8 in).

== Etymology ==
The fish is named in honor of the missionary John Graham (d. 1947), who collected numerous fishes in Yunnan, China, including this type specimen.
