= Silurus dakrongensis =

Scientific classification
- Kingdom: Animalia
- Phylum: Chordata
- Class: Actinopterygii
- Division: Teleostei
- Order: Siluriformes
- Family: Siluridae
- Genus: Silurus
- Species: S. dakrongensis

Binomial name
- Silurus dakrongensis V. H. Nguyễn, T. H. N. Vũ & T. D. P. Nguyễn, 2015

Species of fish

Silurus dakrongensis, the Dakrong catfish, is a species of catfish found in the Đakrông River, Quảng Trị province, in Vietnam.

== Etymology ==
The fish is named after Đakrông River, Vietnam, where the type specimen was found.
