= Silurus lanzhouensis =

Scientific classification
- Kingdom: Animalia
- Phylum: Chordata
- Class: Actinopterygii
- Order: Siluriformes
- Family: Siluridae
- Genus: Silurus
- Species: S. lanzhouensis

Binomial name
- Silurus lanzhouensis H. L. Chen, 1977

Species of fish

Silurus lanzhouensis is a species of catfish found in Asia in the upper Yellow River, China.

== Description ==
This species reaches a length of 100.0 cm (39.4 in).

== Etymology ==
The fish is named in honor of the city of Lanzhou (also spelled Lanchow), in the Gansu Province, China, a city on the Yellow River, where the type specimen was found.
