= Kunming catfish =

Conservation status
- Critically Endangered (IUCN 3.1)

Scientific classification
- Kingdom: Animalia
- Phylum: Chordata
- Class: Actinopterygii
- Order: Siluriformes
- Family: Siluridae
- Genus: Silurus
- Species: S. mento

Binomial name
- Silurus mento Regan, 1904

Species of fish

The Kunming catfish (Silurus mento) is a critically endangered species of catfish in the family Siluridae. It is endemic to Dian Chi Lake, China. There have been no confirmed records in decades and it is feared extinct. S. mento grows to a length of 21.5 centimetres (8.5 in) TL.
