= Silurus joergi =

Silurus joergi Temporal range: Late Miocene

Scientific classification
- Domain: Eukaryota
- Kingdom: Animalia
- Phylum: Chordata
- Class: Actinopterygii
- Order: Siluriformes
- Family: Siluridae
- Genus: Silurus
- Species: †S. joergi

Binomial name
- †Silurus joergi Gaudant, 2015

Extinct species of fish

Silurus joergi is an extinct species of catfish in the genus Silurus that lived during the Late Miocene.

== Distribution ==
Silurus joergi is known from Germany.
