= Silurus longibarbatus =

Scientific classification
- Kingdom: Animalia
- Phylum: Chordata
- Class: Actinopterygii
- Order: Siluriformes
- Family: Siluridae
- Genus: Silurus
- Species: S. longibarbatus

Binomial name
- Silurus longibarbatus Li, J, Li, X. H., Zhang, G, He, Y. J., 2019

Species of fish

Silurus longibarbatus is a species of catfish found in the Qingshuihe stream, near the Yunhuang Village, Xiyan Town, Shanglin County, Guangxi, China, at 23°29'25"N, 108°30'46"E, elevation 164 meters.

== Etymology ==
The fish is named referring to its relatively long barbels. re: longus, long; barbatus, bearded.
