= Silurus langsonensis =

Scientific classification
- Kingdom: Animalia
- Phylum: Chordata
- Class: Actinopterygii
- Order: Siluriformes
- Family: Siluridae
- Genus: Silurus
- Species: S. langsonensis

Binomial name
- Silurus langsonensis V. H. Nguyễn, T. H. N. Vũ & T. D. P. Nguyễn, 2015

Species of fish

Silurus langsonensis, the flower catfish, is a species of catfish found in the Ky Cung River, Lạng Sơn province, Vietnam.

== Etymology ==
The species is named after Lang Son Province, Vietnam, where the type specimen was found.
