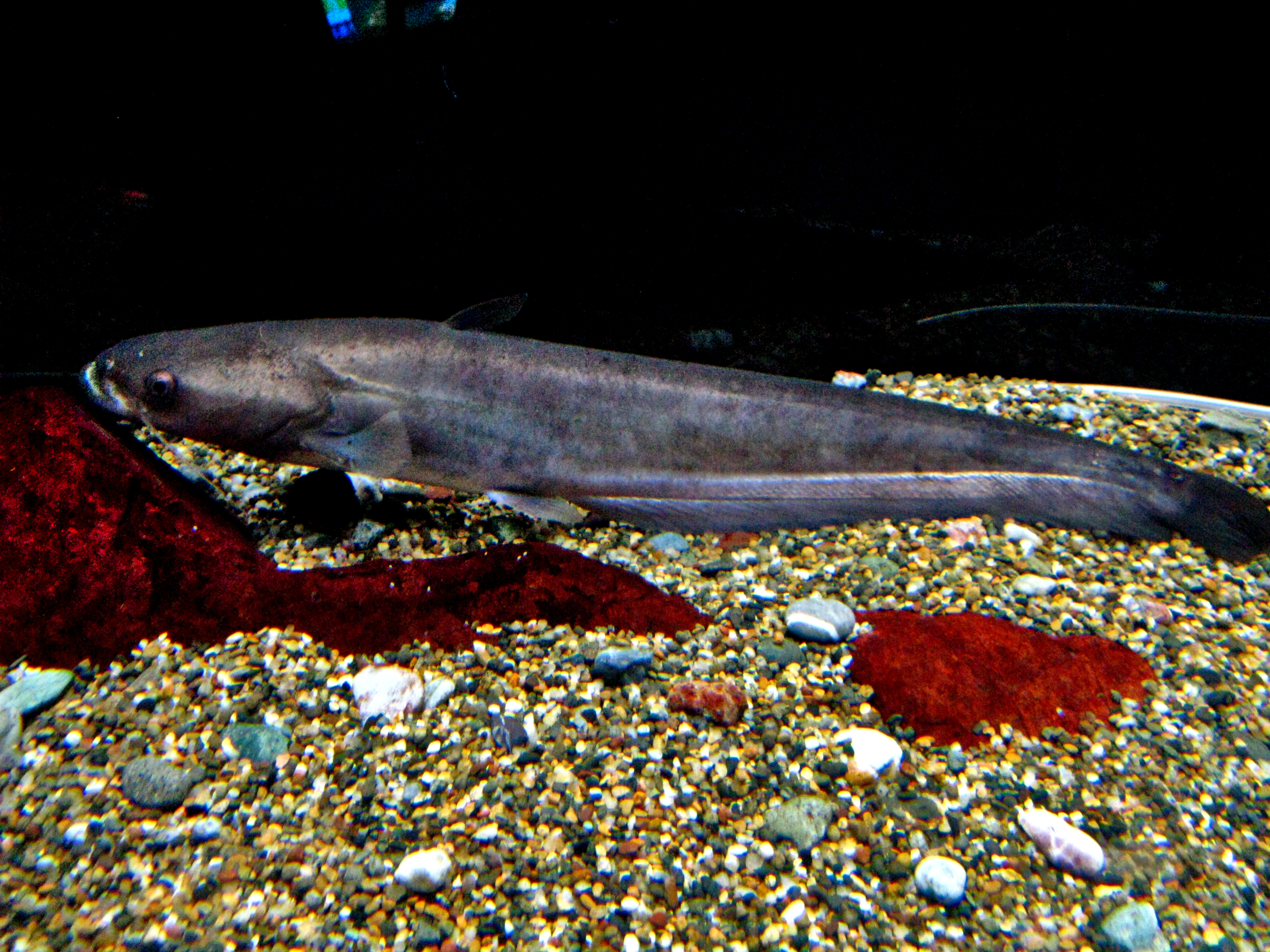
- Silurus biwaensis

Scientific classification
- Kingdom: Animalia
- Phylum: Chordata
- Class: Actinopterygii
- Division: Teleostei
- Order: Siluriformes
- Family: Siluridae
- Genus: Silurus; Linnaeus, 1758

Type species
- Silurus glanis Linnaeus, 1758

Synonyms
- Siluris (misspelling)

= Silurus =

Silurus Temporal range: Late Miocene to present

Genus of fishes

Silurus is a genus of catfishes native to Europe and Asia.

== Species ==
There are currently 20 recognized species in this genus:

- Silurus aristotelis Garman, 1890 (Aristotle's catfish)
- Silurus asotus Linnaeus, 1758 (Amur catfish)
- Silurus biwaensis Tomoda, 1961 (Lake Biwa giant catfish)
- Silurus burmanensis Thant, 1967
- Silurus caobangensis V. H. Nguyễn, T. H. N. Vũ & T. D. P. Nguyễn, 2015 (yellow catfish)
- Silurus chantrei Sauvage, 1882
- Silurus dakrongensis V. H. Nguyễn, T. H. N. Vũ & T. D. P. Nguyễn, 2015 (Dakrong catfish)
- Silurus duanensis X. Y. Hu, J. H. Lan & C. G. Zhang, 2004
- Silurus glanis Linnaeus, 1758 (Wels catfish)
- Silurus grahami Regan, 1907
- Silurus langsonensis V. H. Nguyễn, T. H. N. Vũ & T. D. P. Nguyễn, 2015 (flower catfish)
- Silurus lanzhouensis H. L. Chen, 1977 (Lanzhou catfish)
- Silurus lithophilus Tomoda, 1961 (rock catfish)
- Silurus longibarbatus Li, J, Li, X. H., Zhang, G, He, Y. J., 2019
- Silurus mento Regan, 1904 (Kunming catfish)
- Silurus meridionalis H. L. Chen, 1977 (Yangtze catfish)
- Silurus microdorsalis (Mori, 1936) (slender catfish)
- Silurus soldatovi Nikolskii & Soin, 1948 (Soldatov's catfish)
- Silurus tomodai Y. Hibino & Tabata, 2018
- Silurus triostegus Heckel, 1843 (Mesopotamian catfish)

Fossil species

- Silurus joergi Gaudant, 2015 Late Miocene of Germany.
- Silurus spinosus Kovalchuk & Ferraris, 2016 Late Miocene of Ukraine.
