= Silurus chantrei =

Scientific classification
- Kingdom: Animalia
- Phylum: Chordata
- Class: Actinopterygii
- Order: Siluriformes
- Family: Siluridae
- Genus: Silurus
- Species: S. chantrei

Binomial name
- Silurus chantrei Sauvage, 1882

Species of fish

Silurus chantrei is a species of catfish occurring in Syria and/or the Tigris basin.
