= Silurus burmanensis =

Conservation status
- Data Deficient (IUCN 3.1)

Scientific classification
- Kingdom: Animalia
- Phylum: Chordata
- Class: Actinopterygii
- Order: Siluriformes
- Family: Siluridae
- Genus: Silurus
- Species: S. burmanensis

Binomial name
- Silurus burmanensis Thant, 1967

Synonyms
- Pterocryptis burmanensis (Thant, 1967)

Species of catfish

Silurus burmanensis is a species of catfish found in the Indo-China peninsula.

== Etymology ==
The fish is named in honor of Burma (Myanmar), where this fish is endemic to Inlé Lake.
