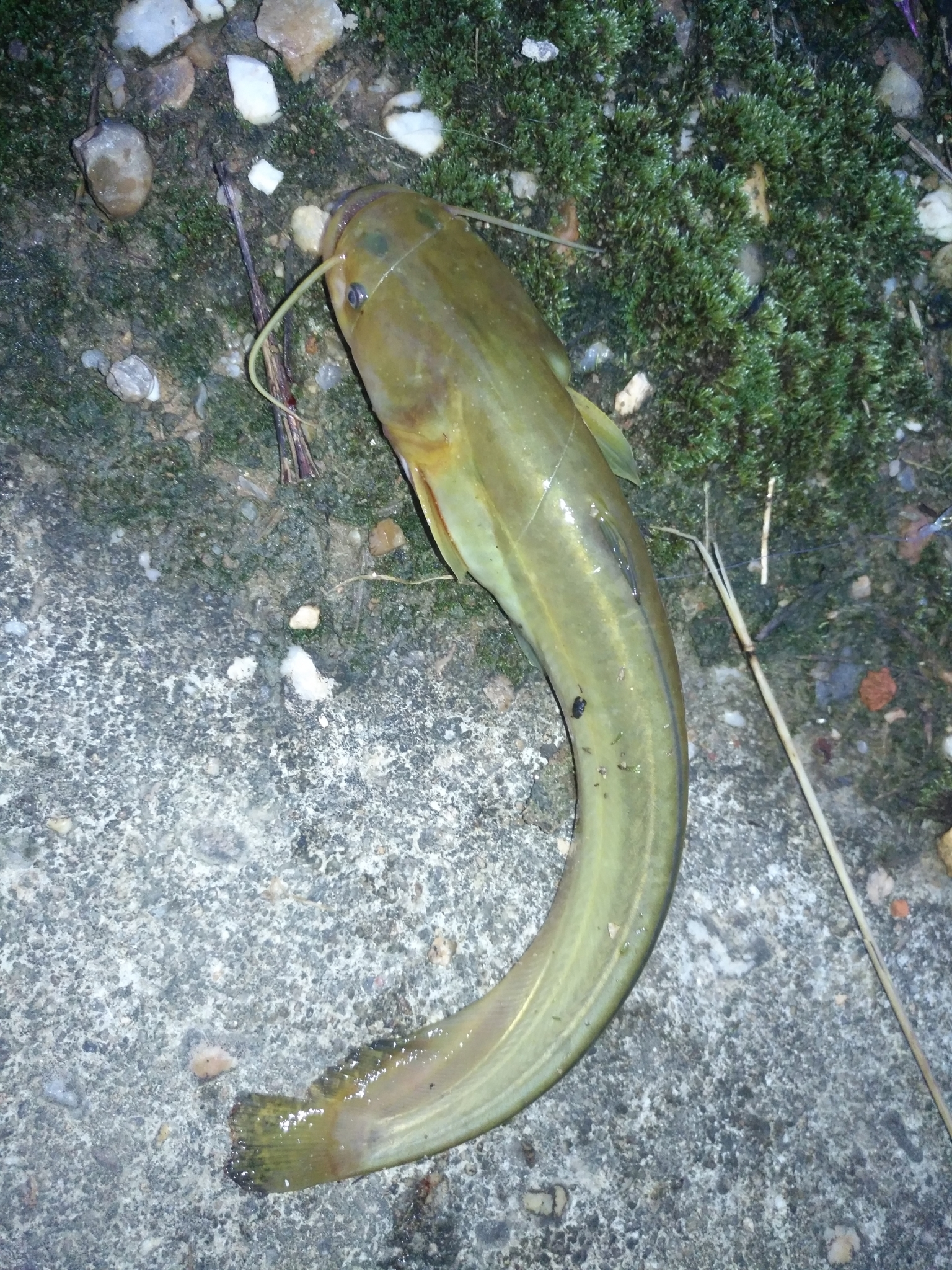

Conservation status
- Least Concern (IUCN 3.1)

Scientific classification
- Kingdom: Animalia
- Phylum: Chordata
- Class: Actinopterygii
- Order: Siluriformes
- Family: Siluridae
- Genus: Silurus
- Species: S. meridionalis

Binomial name
- Silurus meridionalis H. L. Chen, 1977

= Silurus meridionalis =

Species of fish

Silurus meridionalis, the Chinese large-mouth catfish, is a species of catfish found in Asia in the middle Yangtze River basin, China.

== Description ==
This species reaches a length of 114.0 cm (44.9 in).
