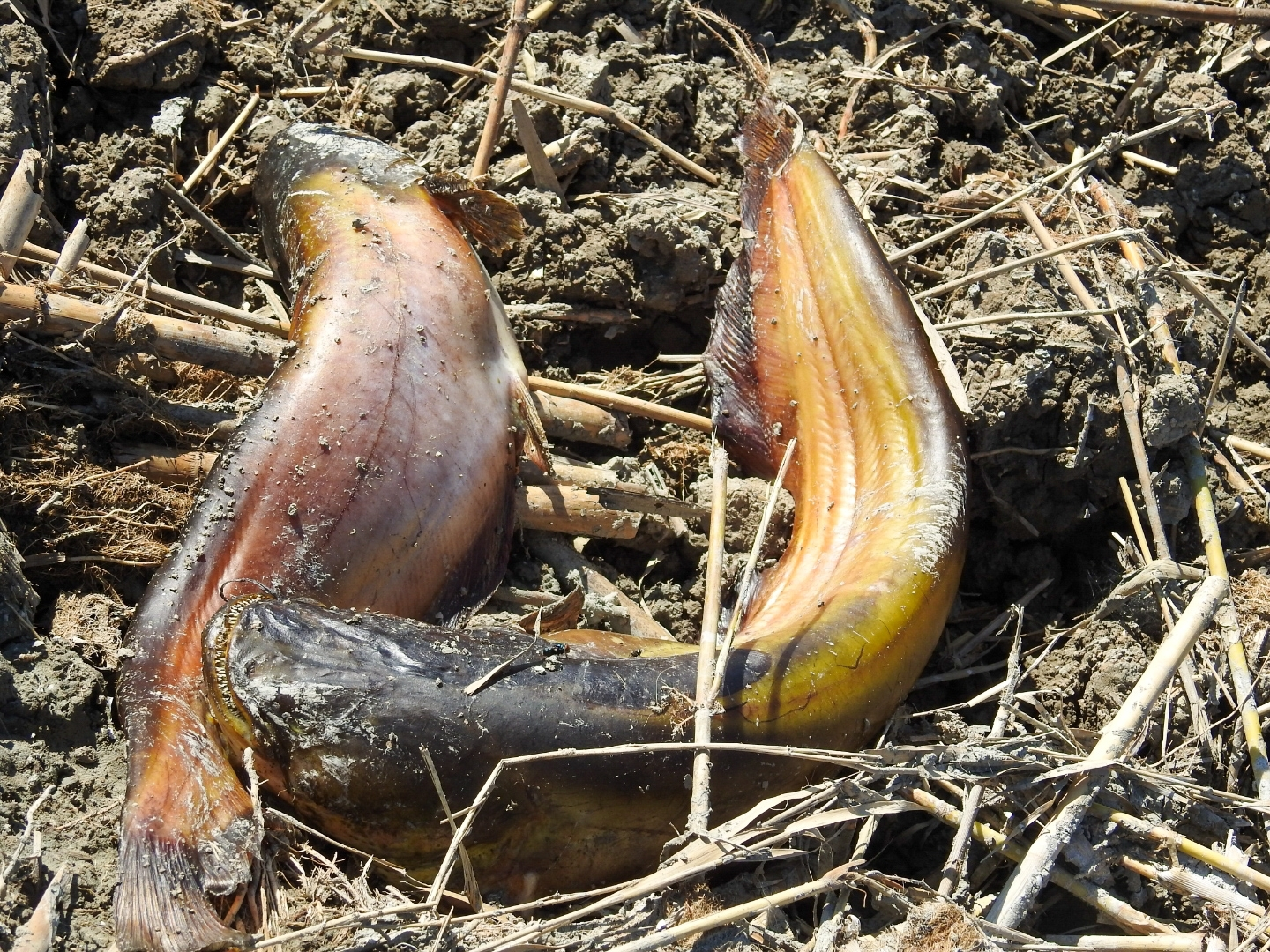

Conservation status
- Least Concern (IUCN 3.1)

Scientific classification
- Kingdom: Animalia
- Phylum: Chordata
- Class: Actinopterygii
- Order: Siluriformes
- Family: Siluridae
- Genus: Silurus
- Species: S. triostegus

Binomial name
- Silurus triostegus Heckel, 1843

= Silurus triostegus =

Species of fish

Silurus triostegus, the Mesopotamian catfish, is a species of catfish found in Iran, Iraq, Syria, and Turkey.

== Description ==
This species reaches a length of 99.0 cm (39.0 in).
