= Silurus caobangensis =

Scientific classification
- Domain: Eukaryota
- Kingdom: Animalia
- Phylum: Chordata
- Class: Actinopterygii
- Order: Siluriformes
- Family: Siluridae
- Genus: Silurus
- Species: S. caobangensis

Binomial name
- Silurus caobangensis V. H. Nguyễn, T. H. N. Vũ & T. D. P. Nguyễn, 2015

Species of fish

Silurus caobangensis, the yellow catfish, is a species of catfish found in the Bang River, Cao Bang Province, Vietnam.

== Etymology ==
The fish is named after Cao Bang province, Viêt Nam, where the type specimen was found.
