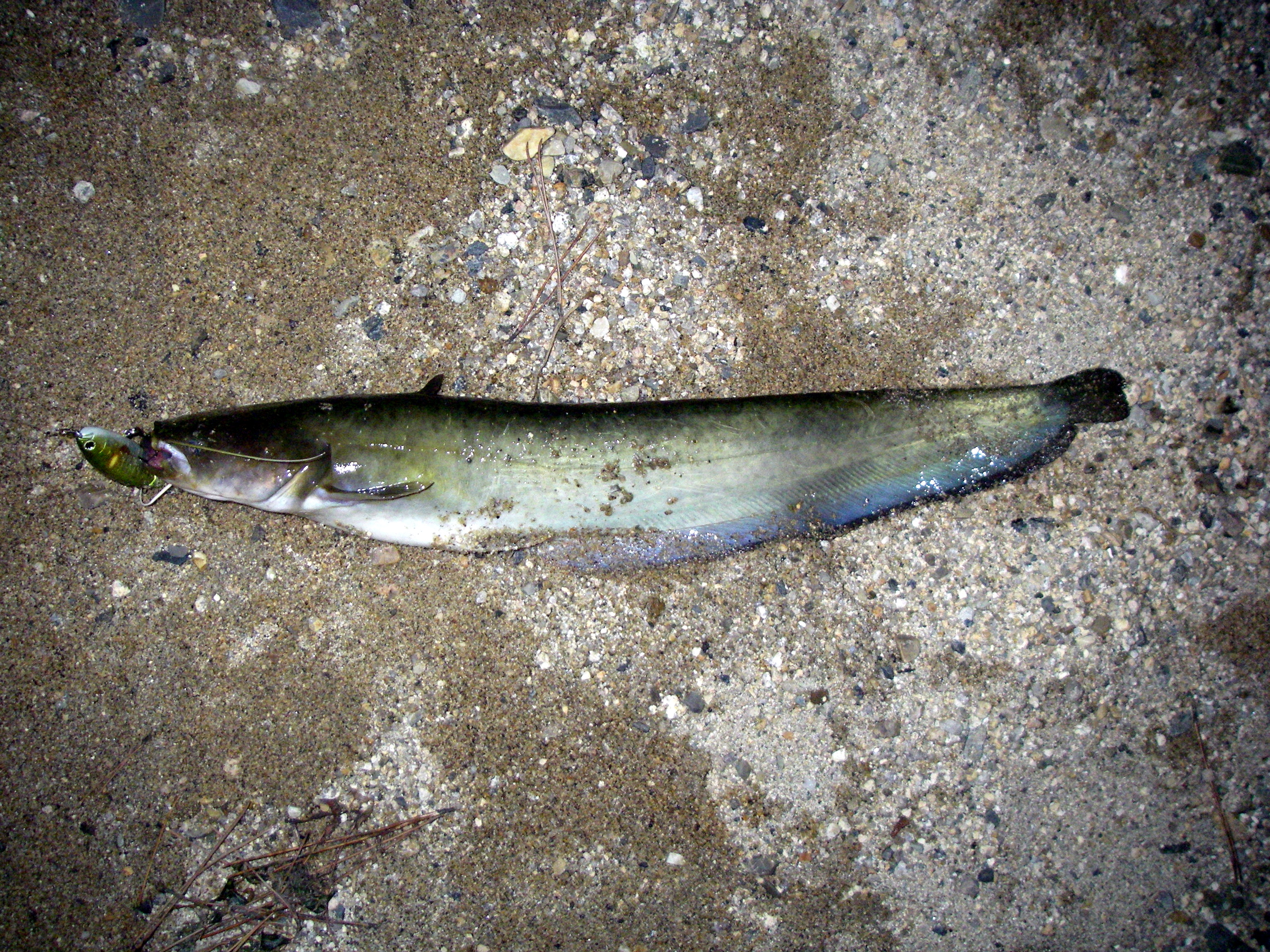
- An Amur catfish caught using a lure at Lake Biwa

Conservation status
- Least Concern (IUCN 3.1)

Scientific classification
- Kingdom: Animalia
- Phylum: Chordata
- Class: Actinopterygii
- Division: Teleostei
- Order: Siluriformes
- Family: Siluridae
- Genus: Silurus
- Species: S. asotus

Binomial name
- Silurus asotus Linnaeus, 1758

Synonyms
- List: Parasilurus asotus (Linnaeus, 1758); Parasilurus asotus subsp. asotus (Linnaeus, 1758); Parasilurus japonicus (Temminck & Schlegel, 1846); Silurus bedfordi Regan, 1908; Silurus cinereus Dabry de Thiersant, 1872; Silurus dahuricus Pallas, 1787; Silurus dauuricus Pallas, 1787; Silurus japonicus Temminck & Schlegel, 1846; Silurus punctatus Cantor, 1842; Centranodon japonicus Lacepède, 1803; Silurus spec Linnaeus, 1758; Silurus xanthosteus Richardson, 1845; Silurichthys basilewskii Bleeker, 1858; Parasilurus asotus subsp. longus Wu, 1930; Siluris imberbis Gmelin, 1789

= Amur catfish =

Species of fish

The Amur catfish (Silurus asotus), also called the Japanese common catfish, Far Eastern catfish, and Chinese catfish, is a carnivorous catfish species belonging to the Siluridae family. It lives in widespread distribution in freshwater habitats across East Asia and is subject to extensive aquaculture. As a freshwater species, it can be found only in the catchments of rivers, ponds, and lakes located in China, Japan, the Korean Peninsula, Taiwan, the Russian Amur Basin and northern Vietnam.

S. asotus features are characteristic of a huge silurid catfish, featuring a white stomach and sporadic white spots on its sides. Fish have one pair of mandibular barbels and one pair of maxillary barbels, which are longer than the head, in both immature and adulthood. The young of this species have an additional pair of mandibular barbels. This species may reach a maximum length of 130 cm, although its typical length is between 30 and 60 cm, and its maximum weight is 30–40 kg.

== Taxonomy ==
Taxonomically, S. asotus is a part of the Actinopterygii class under the Siluridae family. The common names include the Japanese common catfish and Amur catfish. The scientific name Silurus asotus, originates from the Greek word silouros which means a catfish. The Greek term ending -oroudus also means teeth.

== Characteristics ==
This species belongs to the family Siluridae and is characterized by a robust and elongated body that grows approximately 20 – 50 cm per year, which can reach lengths of up to 1.5 meters. S. asotus exhibits a distinctive appearance with a flattened, broad head and a terminal mouth, armed with numerous small, sharp teeth. Its body is covered with smooth, scaleless skin, and its coloration can vary, ranging from olive-green to yellowish-brown, with irregular white dots along the side.

One of the features of S. asotus is its long, filamentous barbels, which extend from the corners of its mouth. These sensitive appendages aid in locating food, as S. asotus is primarily a nocturnal predator. Both immature and mature fish possess a single pair of maxillary barbels that surpass the length of the head, along with a pair of mandibular barbels measuring approximately 20 to 30% of the length of the maxillary barbel. In juvenile fish measuring 6 to 7 cm (2.4 to 2.8 in) in standard length, this species exhibits an additional pair of mandibular barbels. S. asotus is well-adapted to a variety of freshwater aquatic habitats, that range in temperature from 20 to 27 °C (68 to 81 °F), in Taiwan, China, Japan, and in all Korean rivers.

== Ecology ==
S. asotus is a common freshwater fish in Eastern Asia, with a preference for larger bodies of freshwater such as slow-moving rivers, irrigation canals and lakes. It prefers an environment that is dense with grass with a free flow of water and light prevention due to sleeping habits.

=== Common predators ===
Common predators of Amur catfish include various reptiles, including monitor lizards, other fish, otters and birds, such as birds of prey.

=== Migration ===
When placed in alternating environments, the S. asotus is known to migrate downstream to achieve their expected environmental conditions.

== Diet ==
S. asotus are carnivorous fishes and primarily feed on aquatic organisms. Due to the anatomy of S. asotus, the fish have the ability to sink to the bottom of the water and find food more easily. Amur catfish eat aquatic insects, crustaceans, and smaller fishes in their freshwater ecosystem. With the diverse diet selections, S. asotus is able to expand its mouth in order to accommodate larger prey.

S. asotus are nocturnal creatures which affects their feeding times. The fishes feed during the night and go back to their caves during the day. This nocturnal feed is linked to poor floating ability due to bladder enlargement that only allows for swimming in freshwater's floors.

== Sexual reproduction ==
S. asotus typically engages in reproductive activities during the warmer months, often in the spring or early summer, when water temperatures are favorable, typically after a rainy season. The distinct green hue of the eggs serves as a distinctive identifier for the organism, meaning that the egg has been fertilized, and a larger-sized egg displays a higher chance of survival in comparison to smaller eggs. Hatching occurs within approximately 27 hours after egg deposition, a duration influenced by water temperature. In colder environments, the hatching time extends to around 48 hours. S. asotus disperses its eggs during the spawning process, a strategy thought to be designed to minimize mortality among juveniles.

The species exhibits a noticeable imbalance in the apparent sex ratio, heavily favoring females. There is observed intraspecific variation in reproductive ecology, notably in mating behavior, within local populations. For instance, the Biwa population displays a consistent sequence of actions during mating, including chasing, clinging, enfolding with squeezing by the male and circling of the paired fish, where females are consistently enfolded by a single male.

== Consumption and angling ==
Silurus asotus is extensively found in the freshwater bodies of Japan, East China, Korea, and Taiwan. It holds commercial significance in the eastern region of Japan. Nevertheless, the natural populations of this species have undergone a significant decline over the past few decades. In mountain village regions, Japanese catfish serve as a valuable protein source and are consumed as part of the local diet. The cultivation of Japanese catfish is prevalent in these areas. Historically, challenges arose in their cultivation due to cannibalism among the younger fry. However, in recent years, the introduction of new cultivation techniques has significantly increased the production rate of fry.

Anglers pursuing this species often seek out freshwater habitats such as rivers and lakes in East Asia, including Japan, China, Korea, and Taiwan, where the catfish is prevalent. Known for their large size, catching a Silurus asotus has become a popular sport fish (Dulmaa, 1999).

== Conservation ==
While considered to be of "least concern" rangewide by the International Union for Conservation of Nature, S. asotus is listed as "near threatened" in the 2012 Taiwanese Red List of Fresh Water Fishes.
