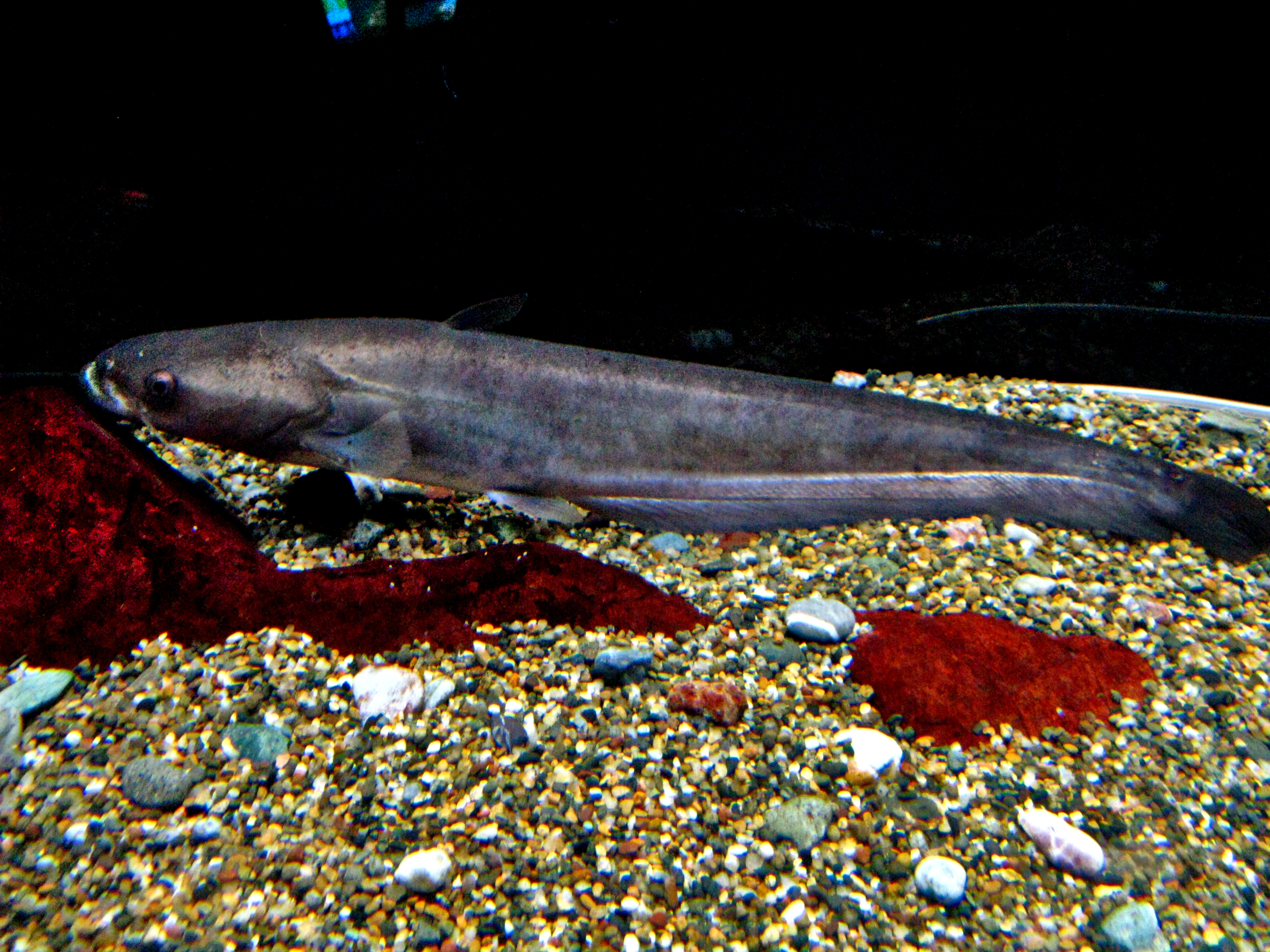

Scientific classification
- Kingdom: Animalia
- Phylum: Chordata
- Class: Actinopterygii
- Division: Teleostei
- Order: Siluriformes
- Family: Siluridae
- Genus: Silurus
- Species: S. biwaensis

Binomial name
- Silurus biwaensis (Tomoda, 1961)

Synonyms
- Parasilurus biwaensis Tomoda, 1961

= Silurus biwaensis =

Species of fish

Silurus biwaensis, the giant Lake Biwa catfish, is a species of freshwater ray-finned fish belonging to the family Siluridae, the sheatfishes. It is a large predatory catfish, resembling the wels catfish (Silurus glanis), which is endemic to Lake Biwa in Japan.

== Taxonomy ==
Silurus biwaensis was first formally described as Parasilurus biwaensis in 1961 by the Japanese ichthyologist Yoshio Tomoda with its type locality given as "Offshore of Onoé, Lake Biwa-ko, Japan". By 1984 this species had been reclassified into the genus Silurus, which has the wels catfish as its type species. The genus Silurus is the type genus of the sheatfish family Siluridae, in the suborder Siluroidei of the order Siluriformes, the catfishes.

== Description ==
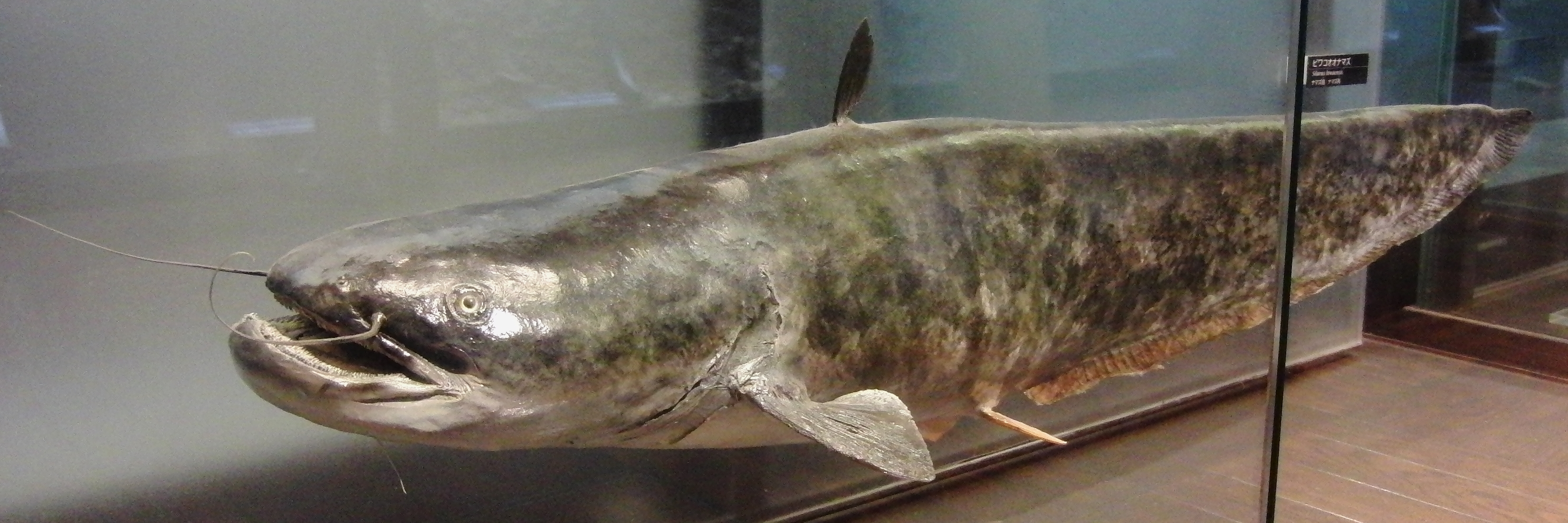
Stuffed specimen

Silurus biwaensis is very similar to wels catfish, which it is closely related to. It has an elongated cylindrical body and can reach up to 1.18 m (3 ft 10 in) in length and weigh as much as 17 kg (37 lb). The top of the body is dark grey to black in colour while the underside is a pale, whitish colour.

== Distribution ==
Silurus biwaensis is endemic to Lake Biwa, Honshu, Japan.

== Life cycle ==
Silurus biwaensis prey on fish and frogs which live in the lake. S. biwaensis is the largest predatory fish in Lake Biwa. Using telemetry methods researchers tried to explain the migratory behaviour of the species. It was found that the fish are more or less site-faithful and mostly stay close to their spawning grounds. Other studies have shown that the sub-populations of the lake hardly mix.

== Relationship to humans ==
Silurus biwaensis features in Japanese mythology. Catfishes have been observed to change their behaviour and become very active when an earthquake is imminent. In Japanese mythology, a giant catfish named Namazu causes earthquakes as he moves below the Earth's surface.
