= Nanwang water division system =

Historical water management system in China

Nanwang water division system (南旺分水; Nánwàng fēnshuǐ or 南旺水利樞紐; Nánwàng shuǐlìshūniǔ) is a historical system for management of the water in the Grand Canal in the Shandong province in China. Nanwang water division system is built in the area around Nanwang in Wenshang County in Jining city that was the highest point of the historical canal

Emperor Yongle (r. 1402–1424) moved the Ming dynasty capital from Nanjing to Beijing which increased the need for traffic along the Grand Canal. The passage through Shandong Peninsula (Huitong Canal) was only to be crossed with great difficulties because the water level was often not high enough and sluices were necessary and passage through sluices. Therefore at the year 1411 the emperor ordered Song Li to renovate the problematic section.

With help from the local expert Bai Ying a water diversion system which included dozens of sluice gates was built. When the system was completed it could adjust the water flow of the canal so the needed transports could be controlled.

The Daicun Dam (戴村壩) diverted water via the "Lesser Wen River" to the reservoirs at Nanwang. In the middle go the 15th century additional sluices was built north and south of Nanwang and levees was erected around the reservoirs. The complete project was carried out in several different phases during the period 1411 to 1505.

Today the Nanwang water division system is an archaeological site and the excavations began in 2008 when 4,000 square meters were excavated.

== See also ==
- Dujiangyan
