= Grand Canal (China) =

System of interconnected canals in China

Coordinates: 30°15′41″N 120°13′26″E

Grand Canal of China
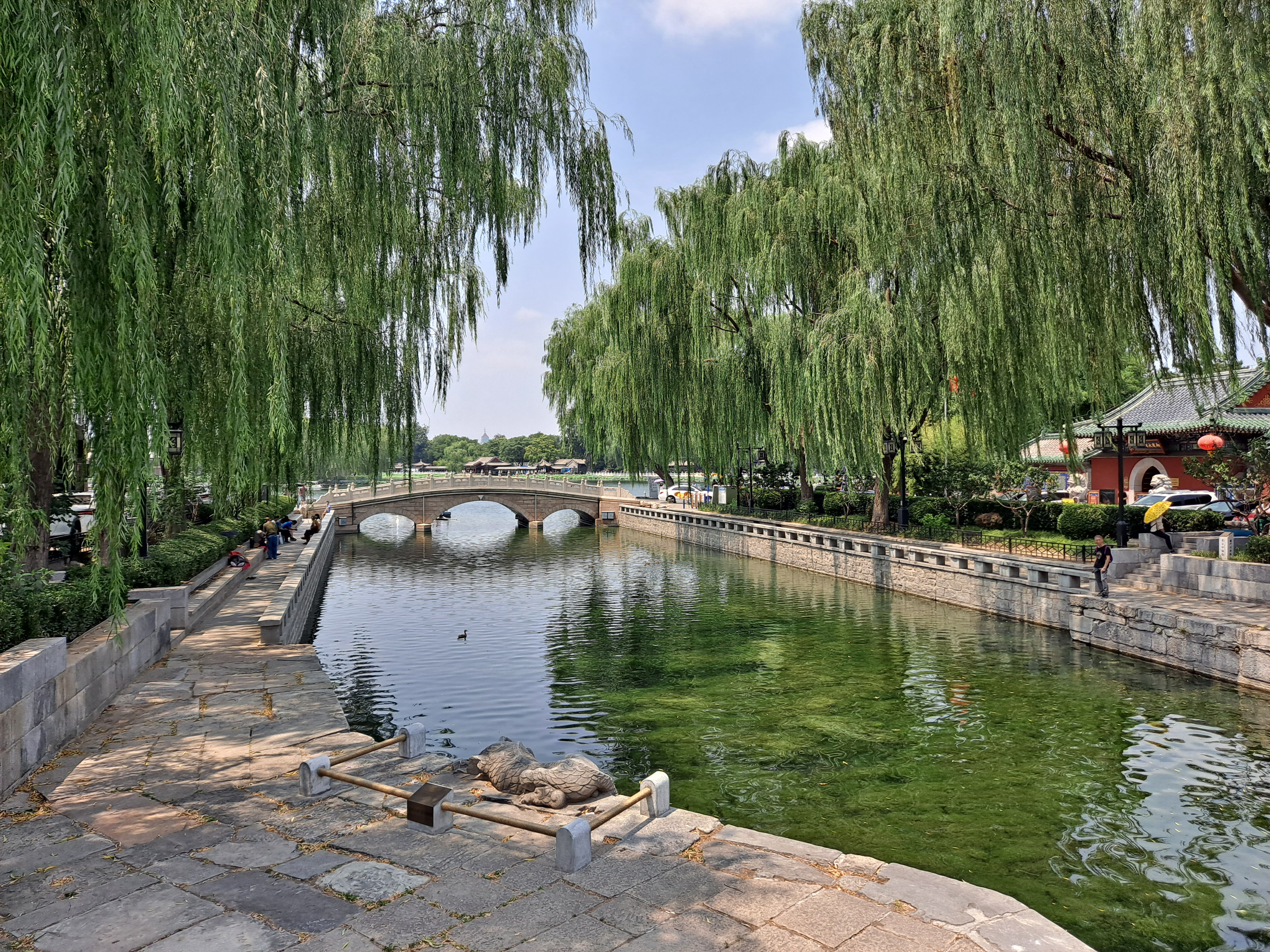
- The canal in Beijing, by the Wanning Bridge

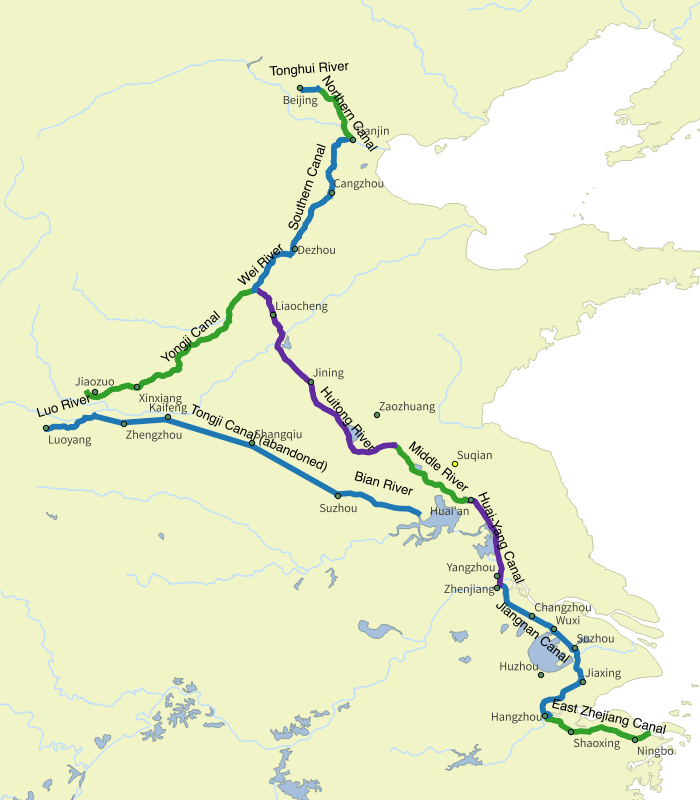
- Courses of the Grand Canal

Specifications
- Length: 1,776 km (1,104 miles)

History
- Construction began: Sui dynasty

Geography
- Start point: Beijing
- End point: Hangzhou
- Connects to: Hai River, Yellow River, Huai River, Yangtze, Qiantang River

UNESCO World Heritage Site
- Official name: The Grand Canal
- Type: Cultural
- Criteria: i, iii, iv, vi
- Designated: 2014 (38th session)
- Reference no.: 1443
- Region: Asia-Pacific

Grand Canal
- "Grand Canal" in simplified (top) and traditional (bottom) Chinese characters
- Simplified Chinese: 大运河
- Traditional Chinese: 大運河
- Literal meaning: "Great Transport River"
Transcriptions
Standard Mandarin
- Hanyu Pinyin: Dà Yùnhé
- Wade–Giles: Ta^{4} Yün^{4}-ho^{2}
- IPA: [tâ ŷn.xɤ̌]
Wu
- Romanization: Du^{平} Yun^{上} Ghu^{平}
Yue: Cantonese
- Yale Romanization: Daaih Wahn-hòh
- Jyutping: Daai6 Wan6-ho4
- IPA: [taj˨ wɐn˨.hɔ˩]
Southern Min
- Hokkien POJ: Tāi-ūn-hô

Beijing-Hangzhou Grand Canal
- Simplified Chinese: 京杭大运河
- Traditional Chinese: 京杭大運河
Transcriptions
Standard Mandarin
- Hanyu Pinyin: Jīng-Háng Dà Yùnhé
- Wade–Giles: Ching^{1}-Hang^{2} Ta^{4} Yün^{4}-he^{2}
- IPA: [tɕíŋxǎŋ tâ ŷnxɤ̌]
Wu
- Romanization: Cin^{平} On^{入} Du^{平} Yun^{上} Ghu^{平}
Yue: Cantonese
- Jyutping: Ging1 Hong4 Daai6 Wan6 Ho4
Southern Min
- Hokkien POJ: Kiaⁿ-hâng-tāi-ūn-hô

The Grand Canal (Chinese: 大运河; pinyin: Dà yùnhé) is a system of interconnected canals linking various major rivers and lakes in North and East China, serving as an important waterborne transport infrastructure between the north and the south during Medieval and premodern China. It is the longest artificial waterway in the world and a World Heritage Site.

The Grand Canal has undergone several route changes throughout history. Its current main stem, known as the Jing–Hang Grand Canal, is thought to extend for 1,776 km (1,104 mi) linking Beijing in the north to Hangzhou in the south, and is divided into 6 main subsections, with the southernmost sections remaining relatively unchanged over time. The Jiangnan Canal starts from the Qiantang River at Hangzhou's Jianggan District, looping around the east side of Lake Tai through Jiaxing, Suzhou and Wuxi, to the Yangtze at Zhenjiang; the Inner Canal from Yangzhou across the Yangtze from Zhenjiang, going through the Gaoyou Lake to join the Huai River at Huai'an, which for centuries was also its junction with the former course of the Yellow River; the Middle Canal from Huai'an to Luoma Lake at Suqian, then to the Nansi Lakes at Weishan; the Lu Canal from the Nansi Lakes at Jining and into the present course of the Yellow River at Liangshan, splitting off downstream at Liaocheng's Dong'e County before continuing to the Wei at Linqing; the Southern Canal (named for its location within Hebei) from Linqing to the Hai River at Tianjin; and the Northern Canal from Tianjin to Tongzhou on the outskirts of Beijing. As such, it passes through the provinces of Zhejiang, Jiangsu, Shandong, Hebei, and the municipalities of Tianjin and Beijing. In 2014, the Chinese government and UNESCO recognized the Eastern Zhejiang Canal from Hangzhou to Ningbo along the former Tongji and Yongji Canals also as official components of the Grand Canal.

The oldest sections of what is now the Grand Canal were completed in the early 5th century BC during the conflicts of China's Spring and Autumn period to provide supplies and transport routes for the states of Wu and Yue. The network was expanded and completed by Emperor Yang of Sui in 609, linking fertile Jiangnan in the south to his capital at Luoyang in the Central Plain and to his armies in the northern frontiers. His unsuccessful and unpopular Goguryeo–Sui War and the massive amounts of civil conscription involved in creating the canals were among the chief factors in the rampant rebellions during his reign and the eventual rapid fall of the Sui, but the connection of major watersheds and population centers proved enormously beneficial during the subsequent Tang dynasty.

Additional canals supplied Chang'an (now Xi'an) even further west were rebuilt under the Tang to better connect the Guanzhong heartland to the Central Plain, while stopover towns along the main course became the economic hubs of the empire. Sections of the canal gradually degraded and faded into ruins during the Five Dynasties and Ten Kingdoms period and the Song dynasty, and periodic flooding of the Yellow River associated with climate changes during the Medieval Warm Period had eroded and threatened the safety and functioning of the canal while, during wartime, the rivers' high dikes were sometimes deliberately breached to delay or sweep away advancing enemy troops. Even so, restoration and improvement of the canal and its associated flood control works was assumed as a duty by each successive dynasty. The canal played a major role in periodically reuniting northern and southern China, and officials in charge of the canal and nearby salt works grew enormously wealthy. Despite damage from floods, rebellions and wars, the canal's importance only grew with the relocation of the national capital to Khanbaliq (now known as Beijing) under Kublai Khan during the Mongol Yuan dynasty, and again later under Yongle Emperor during the Ming dynasty and under Shunzhi Emperor the Manchu Qing dynasty. Despite the importance of railways and highways in modern times, the People's Republic of China has worked to improve the navigability of the canal since the end of the Chinese Civil War and the portion south of the Yellow River remains in heavy use by barges carrying bulk cargo. Increasing concern over pollution in China and particularly the use of the Grand Canal as the eastern path of the South-North Water Diversion Project—intended to provide clean potable water to the north—has led to regulations and several projects to improve water quality along the canals.

The greatest height on the canal is an elevation of 42 m (138 ft) above sea level reached in the foothills of Shandong. Ships in Chinese canals did not have trouble reaching higher elevations after the Song official and engineer Qiao Weiyue (926–1001) invented the pound lock in the 10th century. The canal has been admired by many visitors throughout its history, including the Japanese monk Ennin (794–864), the Persian historian Rashid al-Din Hamadani (1247–1318), the Korean official Choe Bu (1454–1504), and the Italian missionary Matteo Ricci (1552–1610).

== History ==
=== Early periods ===
In the late Spring and Autumn period, King Fuchai of Wu (whose capital was in present-day Suzhou), ventured north to attack the State of Qi. He ordered a canal to be constructed for trading purposes, as well as a means to ship ample supplies north in case his forces should engage the northern states of Song and Lu. This became known as the Han or Hangou Canal (t 邗溝, s 邗沟, Hángōu). Work began in 486 BC, from south of Yangzhou to north of Huai'an in Jiangsu, and within three years the Han Canal had connected the Yangtze with the Huai River utilizing existing waterways, lakes, and marshes.

The Han Canal is known as the second oldest section of the later Grand Canal since the Hong Canal (t 鴻溝, s 鸿沟, Hónggōu, "Canal of the Wild Geese" or "Far-Flung Canal") most likely preceded it. It linked the Yellow River near Kaifeng to the Si and Bian rivers and became the model for the shape of the Grand Canal in the north. The exact date of the Hong Canal's construction is uncertain; it is first mentioned by the diplomat Su Qin in 330 BC when discussing state boundaries. The historian Sima Qian (145–90 BC) knew of no historical date for it, placing his discussion of it just after the legendary works of Yu the Great; modern scholars now consider it to belong to the 6th century BC.

=== Sui dynasty ===
The Grand Canal, under Sui and Tang dynasties.

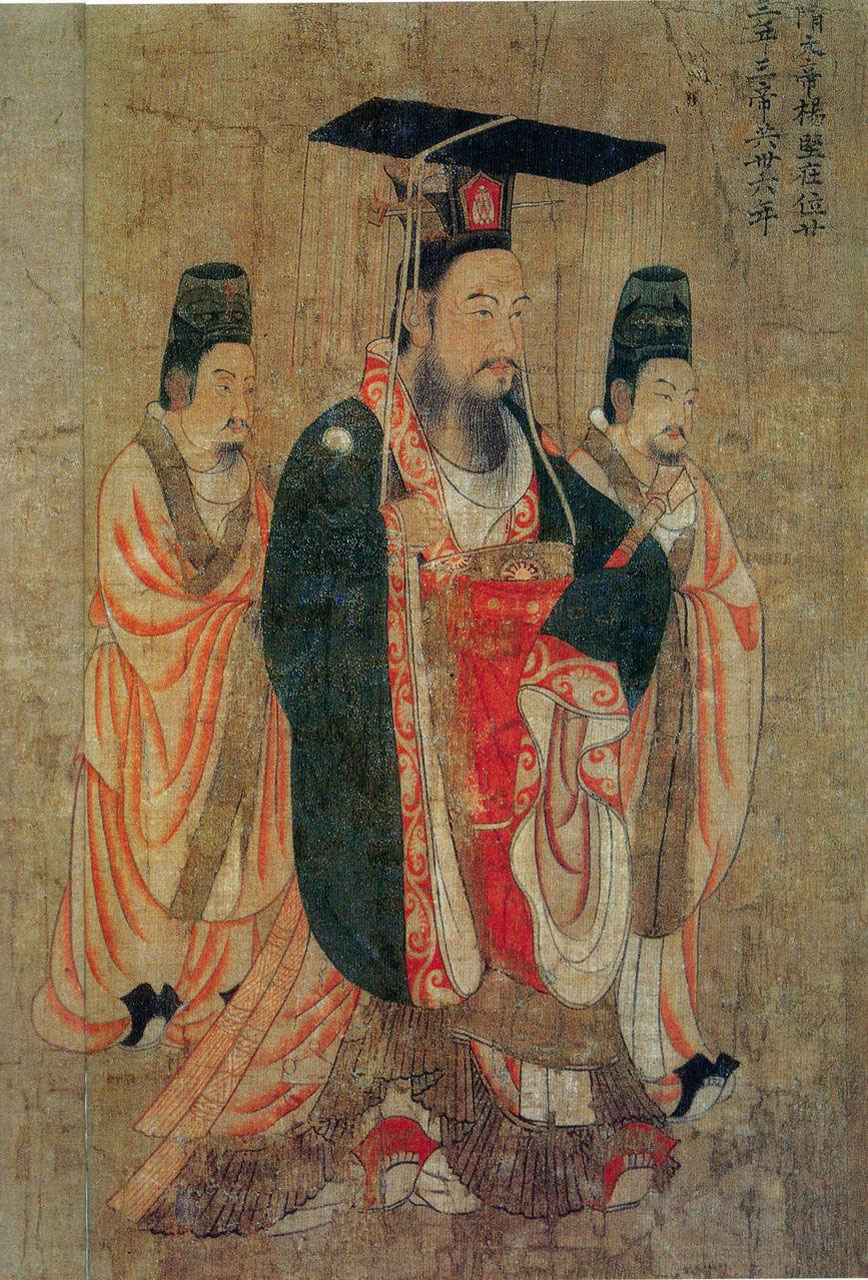
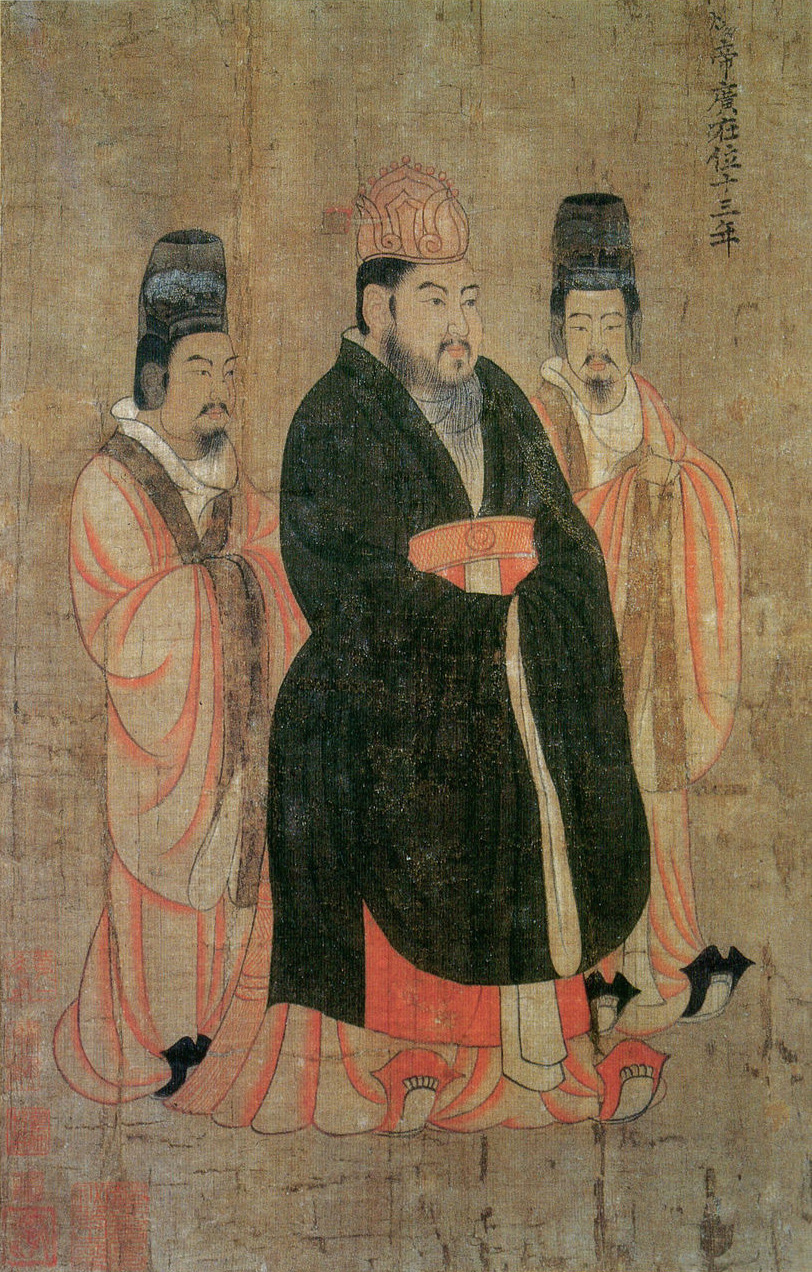
Emperor Wen of Sui, who launched the project of the Grand Canal (left), alongside his son Emperor Yang of Sui, who completed the first stage of the project (right). Both paintings by Yan Liben.

The reunification of China under the Sui dynasty (581–618) ended three centuries of chaos since the Upheaval of the Five Barbarians, and the renewed political stability allowed both the thorough repair of existing canals and flood control systems as well as the construction of new canals. The primary consideration of the Sui canals was the need to tap into the expanding economic and agricultural resources of Jiangnan in the southeast to enrich the capital at Luoyang to the west and to supply the expeditionary Sui armies in the Goguryeo–Sui War to the northeast. The institution of the Grand Canal also obviated the need for army garrisons to become self-sufficient part-time militia-farmers while guarding the dry frontiers between China, Goguryeo, and the First Turkic Khaganate.

A levee-building project in 587 along the Yellow River—overseen by engineer Liang Rui—established canal lock gates to regulate water levels for the canal. Double slipways were installed to haul boats over when the difference in water levels was too great for the flash lock to operate. Similarly, by the year 600, there were major buildups of silt on the bottom of the Hong Canal, obstructing river barges whose drafts were too deep for its waters. The chief engineer of the Sui dynasty, Yuwen Kai, advised the digging of a new canal that would run parallel to the existing canal, diverging from it at Chenliu (Yanzhou). The new canal was to pass not Xuzhou but Suzhou, to avoid connecting with the Si River and instead make a direct connection with the Huai River just west of Hongze Lake. With the recorded labor of five million people under the supervision of Ma Shumou, the first major section of the Grand Canal was completed in the year 605 and was called the Bian Qu.

The Grand Canal was fully completed from the years 604 to 609 under Emperor Yang of Sui, first by linking his southern capital Yangzhou northwest to Luoyang by the Tongji Canal (t 通濟渠, s 通济渠, Tōngjì Qú). He then proceeded to connect Yangzhou southeast to Suzhou and Hangzhou by the Jiangnan Canal and to connect Luoyang northeast to his war with Goguryeo by the Yongji Canal (t 永濟渠, s 永济渠, Yǒngjì Qú). After this network's completion in 609, Emperor Yang was said to have led a flotilla of boats 105 km (65 mi) long from the north down to his southern capital at Yangzhou. This process again involved massive levies of conscripted labor and was detailed at length in the Record of the Opening of the Canal (t 《開河記》, s 《开河记》, Kāihéjì).

At this point, the Grand Canal continued to use noncontiguous artificial channels and both canalized and natural waterways rather than presenting a single continuous manmade canal. However, running alongside and parallel to the course of the canals was an imperial roadway with stables maintained at regular intervals to support a rapid courier system. Enormous lines of trees were also planted along parts of the canal as windbreaks.

=== Tang to Yuan dynasties ===
Although the Tang dynasty (618–907) capital at Chang'an was the most thriving metropolis of China in its day, it was the city of Yangzhou—in proximity to the Grand Canal—that was the economic hub of the Tang era. Besides being the headquarters for the government salt monopoly and the largest pre-modern industrial production center of the empire, Yangzhou was also the geographical midpoint along the north–south trade axis, and so became the major center for southern goods shipped north. One of the greatest benefits of the canal system in the Tang dynasty—and subsequent dynasties—was that it reduced the cost of shipping grain that had been collected in taxes (caoyun) from the Yangtze Delta to northern China. Minor additions to the canal were made after the Sui period to cut down on travel time, but overall no fundamental differences existed between the Sui Grand Canal and the Tang Grand Canal.

By the year 735, it was recorded that about 149,685,400 kilograms (165,000 short tons) of grain were shipped annually along the canal. The Tang government oversaw canal lock efficiency and built granaries along the route in case a flood or other disaster impeded the path of shipment. To ensure smooth travel of grain shipments, Transport Commissioner Liu Yan (in office from 763 to 779) had special river barge ships designed and constructed to fit the depths of each section of the entire canal.

After the An Lushan rebellion (755–763), the economy of North China was greatly damaged and never recovered due to wars and to constant flooding of the Yellow River. Such a case occurred in the year 858 when an enormous flood along the Grand Canal inundated thousands of acres of farmland and killed tens of thousands of people in the North China Plain. Such an unfortunate event could reduce the legitimacy of a ruling dynasty by causing others to perceive it as having lost the Mandate of Heaven; this was a good reason for dynastic authorities to maintain a smooth and efficient canal system.

The invention of the water-level-adjusting pound lock in the 10th century was done in response to the necessity of greater safety for the travel of barge ships along the rougher waters of the Grand Canal.

The city of Kaifeng grew to be a major hub, later becoming the capital of the Song dynasty (960–1279). Although the Tang and Song dynasty international seaports—the greatest being Guangzhou and Quanzhou, respectively—and maritime foreign trade brought merchants great fortune, it was the Grand Canal within China that spurred the greatest amount of economic activity and commercial profit. During the Song and earlier periods, barge ships occasionally crashed and wrecked along the Shanyang Yundao section of the Grand Canal while passing the double slipways, and more often than not those were then robbed of the tax grain by local bandits. This prompted Qiao Weiyue, an Assistant Commissioner of Transport for Huainan, to invent a double-gate system known as the pound lock in the year 984. This allowed ships to wait within a gated space while the water could be drained to appropriate levels; the Chinese also built roofed hangars over the space to add further protection for the ships.

Much of the Grand Canal was ruined for several years after 1128 when Kaifeng's governor Du Chong (杜充, Dù Chōng, d. 1141) decided to break the dykes and dams holding back the waters of the Yellow River in order to decimate the oncoming Jurchen invaders during the Jin–Song wars. Over a series of floods, this entirely shifted the river south of Shandong, capturing the course of the Si River and emptying the Yellow River into Hongze Lake and the East China Sea for centuries. The Jurchen Jin dynasty continually battled with the Song in this region. The warfare led to the dilapidation of the canal until the Mongols invaded in the 13th century and began necessary repairs.

The Chinese invention of the pound lock system allows for water levels to be raised or lowered to improve travel in the canal.

During the Mongol Yuan dynasty (1271–1368) the capital of China was moved to Beijing, eliminating the need for the canal arm flowing west to Kaifeng or Luoyang. A summit section was dug across the foothills of the Shandong massif during the 1280s, shortening the overall length by as much as 700 km (430 mi), making the total length about 1,800 km (1,100 mi) and linking Hangzhou and Beijing with a direct north–south waterway for the first time. As in the Song and Jin era, the canal fell into disuse and dilapidation during the Yuan dynasty's decline.

The Grand Canal as infrastructure has had influence on other architectural works in the west. The Erie Canal in North America is designed and draws inspiration from the Chinese architecture. Many saw the canal as an economic advantage that could bring economic prosperity, like the canal and its benefits. Matteo Ricci's Journals describes the canal in great detail documenting the economic prosperity. The pound lock is one of the more notable features of the Erie canal that is directly connected to the infrastructure of the Grand Canal as it is used in other similar bodies of water.

=== Ming dynasty restoration ===
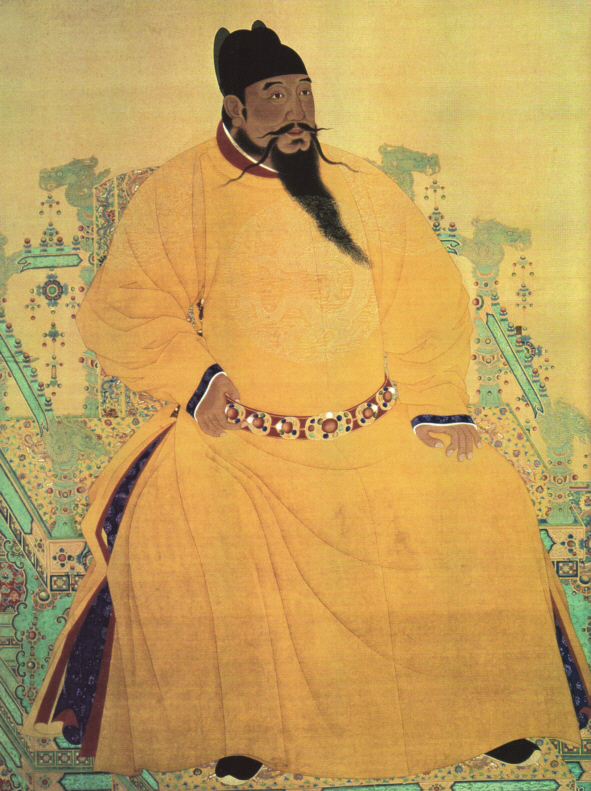
The Yongle Emperor (r. 1402–1424) restored the Grand Canal in the Ming era.

The Grand Canal was renovated almost in its entirety between 1411 and 1415 during the Ming dynasty (1368–1644). A magistrate of Jining, Shandong sent a memorandum to the throne of the Yongle Emperor protesting the current inefficient means of transporting 4,000,000 dan (428,000,000 liters) of grain a year by means of transferring it along several different rivers and canals in barge types that went from deep to shallow after the Huai River, and then transferred back onto deep barges once the shipment of grain reached the Yellow River. Chinese engineers built a dam to divert the Wen River to the southwest in order to feed 60% of its water north into the Grand Canal, with the remainder going south. They dug four large reservoirs in Shandong to regulate water levels, which allowed them to avoid pumping water from local sources and water tables. Between 1411 and 1415 a total of 165,000 laborers dredged the canal bed in Shandong and built new channels, embankments, and canal locks.

The Yongle Emperor moved the Ming capital from Nanjing to Beijing in 1403. This move deprived Nanjing of its status as chief political center of China. The reopening of the Grand Canal also benefited Suzhou over Nanjing since the former was in a better position on the main artery of the Grand Canal, and so it became Ming China's greatest economic center. The only other viable contender with Suzhou in the Jiangnan region was Hangzhou, but it was located 200 km (120 mi) further down the Grand Canal and away from the main delta. Even the shipwrecked Korean Choe Bu (1454–1504)—while traveling for five months throughout China in 1488—acknowledged that Hangzhou served not as a competitor but as an economic feeder into the greater Suzhou market. Therefore, the Grand Canal served to make or break the economic fortunes of certain cities along its route and served as the economic lifeline of indigenous trade within China.

The scholar Gu Yanwu of the early Qing dynasty (1644–1912) estimated that the previous Ming dynasty had to employ 47,004 full-time laborers recruited by the lijia corvée system in order to maintain the entire canal system. It is known that 121,500 soldiers and officers were needed simply to operate the 11,775 government grain barges in the mid-15th century.

Besides its function as a grain shipment route and major vein of river-borne indigenous trade in China, the Grand Canal had long been a government-operated courier route as well. In the Ming dynasty, official courier stations were placed at intervals of 35 to 45 km (22 to 28 mi). Each courier station was assigned a different name, all of which were popularized in travel songs of the period.

=== Qing dynasty ===
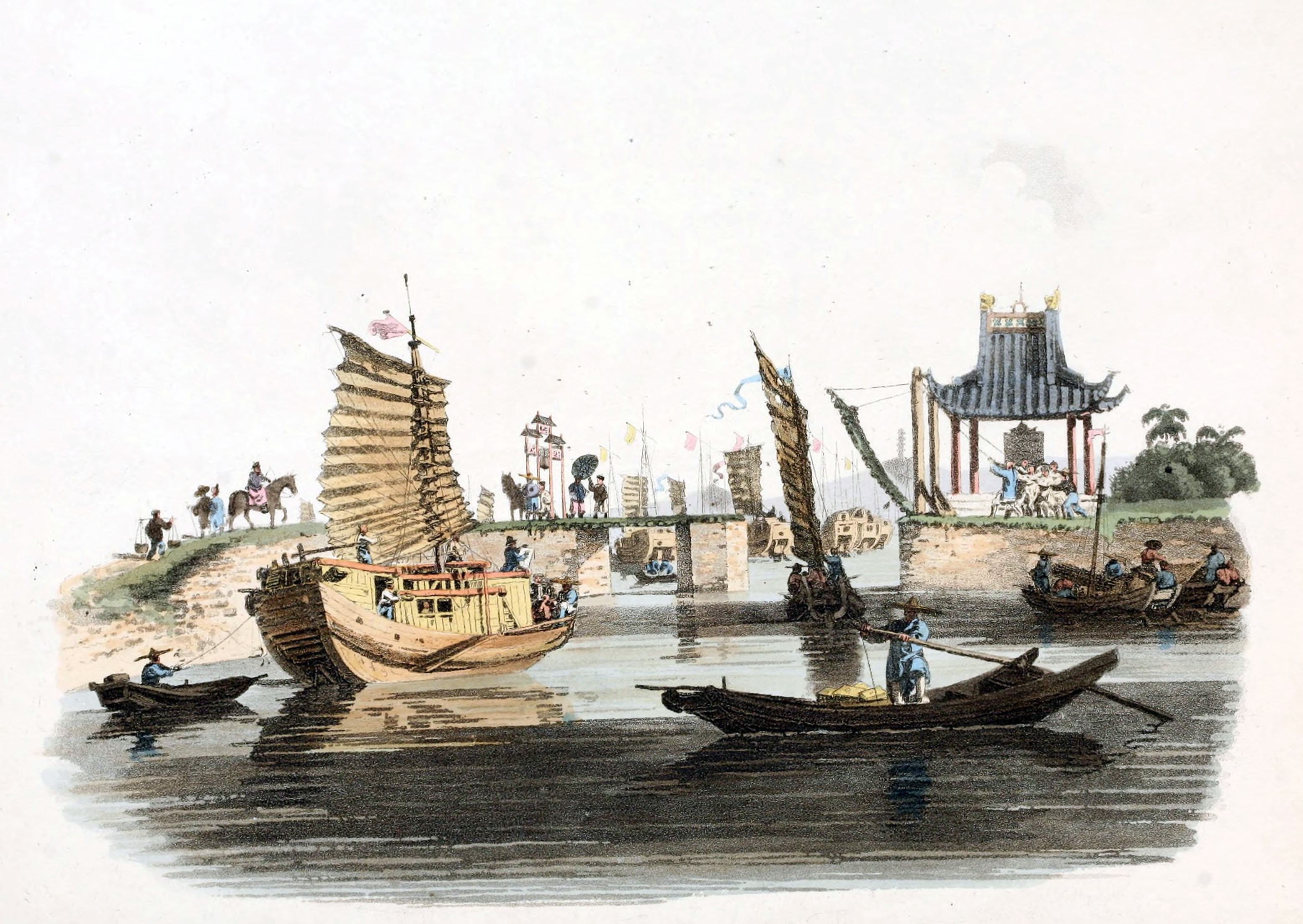
Grand Canal. Drawing by William Alexander, draughtsman of the Macartney Embassy to China in 1793.

The Manchus invaded China in the mid-17th century, allowed through the northern passes by the Chinese general Wu Sangui once the Ming capital at Beijing had fallen into the hands of a rebel army. The Manchus established the Qing dynasty (1644–1912), and under their leadership, the Grand Canal was overseen and maintained just as in earlier times.

In 1855, the Yellow River flooded and changed its course, severing the course of the canal in Shandong. This was foreseen by a Chinese official in 1447, who remarked that the flood-prone Yellow River made the Grand Canal like a throat that could be easily strangled (leading some officials to request restarting the grain shipments through the East China Sea). In 1855 the dikes of the canal were opened to flood advancing troops of the Taiping Rebellion's Northern Expedition.

=== Modern China ===
Because of various factors—the difficulty of crossing the Yellow River, the increased development of an alternative sea route for grain-ships, and the opening of the Tianjin-Pukou Railway and the Beijing-Hankou Railway—the canal languished and for decades the northern and southern parts remained separate. Many of the canal sections fell into disrepair, and some parts were returned to flat fields. Even today, the Grand Canal has not fully recovered its importance prior to the floods of the mid-19th century. After the founding of the People's Republic of China in 1949, the need for economic development led the authorities to order heavy reconstruction work.

The Grand Canal played a major role during Mao Zedong's Great Leap Forward as it provided an efficient way to transport grain. It was further refurbished following Deng Xiaoping's Reform and Opening Up, with improving economic conditions leading to greater infrastructure investment. The economic importance of the canal will likely continue. The provincial governments of Shandong, Jiangsu, and Zhejiang undertook dredging intended to increase shipping capacity by 40 percent by 2012. The central government has also made the main route of the Grand Canal the eastern path of the South-North Water Diversion Project, using enormous pumping stations to redirect water from the Yangtze Delta to the drier north.

The canal became greatly polluted during China's industrialization. By the 1990s, canal barge crews could tell when they neared Hangzhou by the stench of the visibly black water they passed through. Similarly, fishermen on Dongping Lake in Shandong objected to the introduction of water from the Yangtze as part of the South-North Water Diversion Project when they saw it noticeably killing fish and affecting their catch. During the 21st century, increasing efforts have been made to improve environmental conditions along the canal. Around Hangzhou, for instance, a $250 million restoration project begun in 2001 improved water quality to the point where it no longer produces a noticeable odor and is once again capable of supporting some fauna.

On 22 June 2014, UNESCO's Conference on World Heritage listed the Grand Canal as a World Heritage Site. In 2021, the China Grand Canal Museum was opened.

=== Historical sections ===
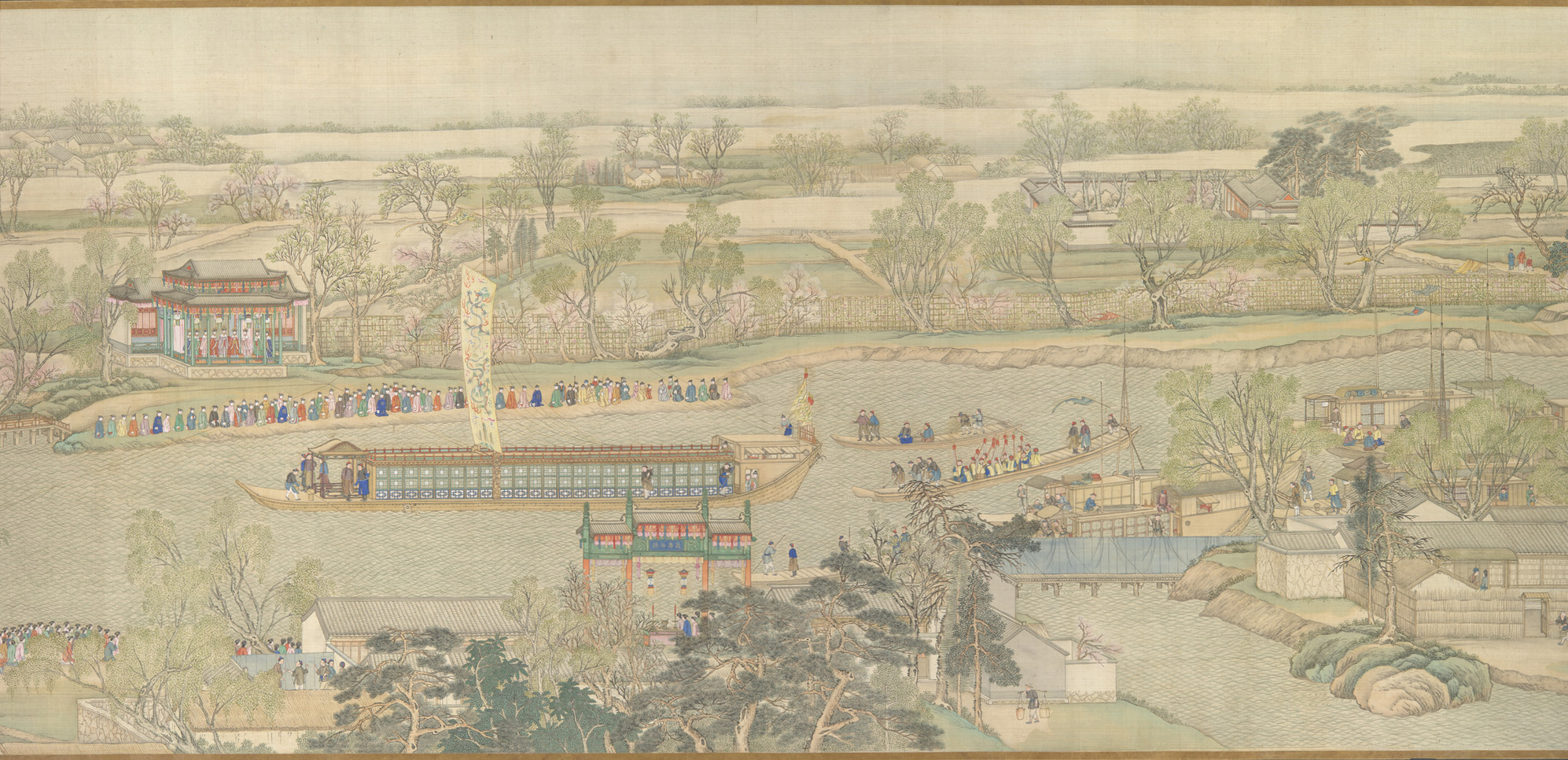
The Qianlong Emperor's Southern Inspection Tour, Scroll Six: Entering Suzhou along the Grand Canal dated 1770.

As well as its present-day course, fourteen centuries of canal-building have left the Grand Canal with a number of historical sections. Some of these have disappeared, others are still partially extant, and others form the basis for the modern canal. The following are the most important but do not form an exhaustive list.

==== Jia Canal ====
In 12 BC, in order to solve the problem of the Grand Canal having to use 160 kilometers (100 mi) of the perilous course of the Yellow River in Northern Jiangsu, a man named Li Hualong created the Jia Canal. Named after the Jia River whose course it followed, it ran 140 kilometers (87 mi) from Xiazhen (modern Weishan) on the shore of Shandong's Weishan Lake to Suqian in Jiangsu. The construction of the Jia Canal left only 100 kilometers (62 mi) of Yellow River navigation on the Grand Canal, from Suqian to Huai'an, which by 1688 had been removed by the construction of the Middle Canal by Jin Fu.

==== Nanyang New Canal ====
In 1566, to escape the problems caused by flooding of the Yellow River around Yutai (now on the western shore of Weishan Lake), the Nanyang New Canal was opened. It ran for 75 kilometers (47 mi) from Nanyang (now Nanyang Town, located in the center of Weishan Lake) to the small settlement of Liucheng (in the vicinity of modern Gaolou Village, Weishan County, Shandong) north of Xuzhou City. This change in effect moved the Grand Canal from the low-lying and flood-prone land west of Weishan Lake onto the marginally higher land to its east. It was fed by rivers flowing from east to west from the borders of the Shandong massif.

==== Huitong Canal ====
North of the Jizhou Canal summit section, the Huitong Canal ran downhill, fed principally by the River Wen, to join the Wei River in the city of Linqing. In 1289, a geological survey preceded its one-year construction. The Huitong Canal, built by an engineer called Ma Zhizhen, ran across sharply sloping ground and the high concentration of locks gave it the nicknames chahe or zhahe, i.e. 'the river of locks'. Its great number of feeder springs (between two and four hundred, depending on the counting method and season of the year) also led to it being called the quanhe or 'river of springs'.

==== Jizhou Canal ====
This, the Grand Canal's first true summit section, was engineered by the Mongol Oqruqči in 1238 to connect Jining to the southern end of the Huitong Canal. It rose to a height of 42 meters (138 ft) above the Yangtze, but environmental and technical factors left it with chronic water shortages until it was re-engineered in 1411 by Song Li of the Ming. Song Li's improvements, recommended by a local man named Bai Ying, included damming the rivers Wen and Guang and drawing lateral canals from them to feed reservoir lakes at the very summit, at a small town called Nanwang.

==== Duke Huan's Conduit ====
In AD 369, General Huan Wen of the Eastern Jin dynasty connected the shallow river valleys of the Huai and the Yellow. He achieved this by joining two of these rivers' tributaries, the Si and the Ji respectively, at their closest point, across a low watershed of the Shandong massif. Huan Wen's primitive summit canal became a model for the engineers of the Jizhou Canal.

==== Yilou Canal ====
The Shanyang Canal originally opened onto the Yangtze a short distance south of Yangzhou. As the north shore of the Yangtze gradually silted up to create the sandbank island of Guazhou, it became necessary for boats crossing to and from the Jiangnan Canal to sail the long way around the eastern edge of that island. After a particularly rough crossing of the Yangtze from Zhenjiang, the local prefect realized that a canal dug directly across Guazhou would reduce the journey time and thus make the crossing safer. The Yilou Canal was opened in 738 and still exists, though not as part of the modern Grand Canal route.

== Modern course ==
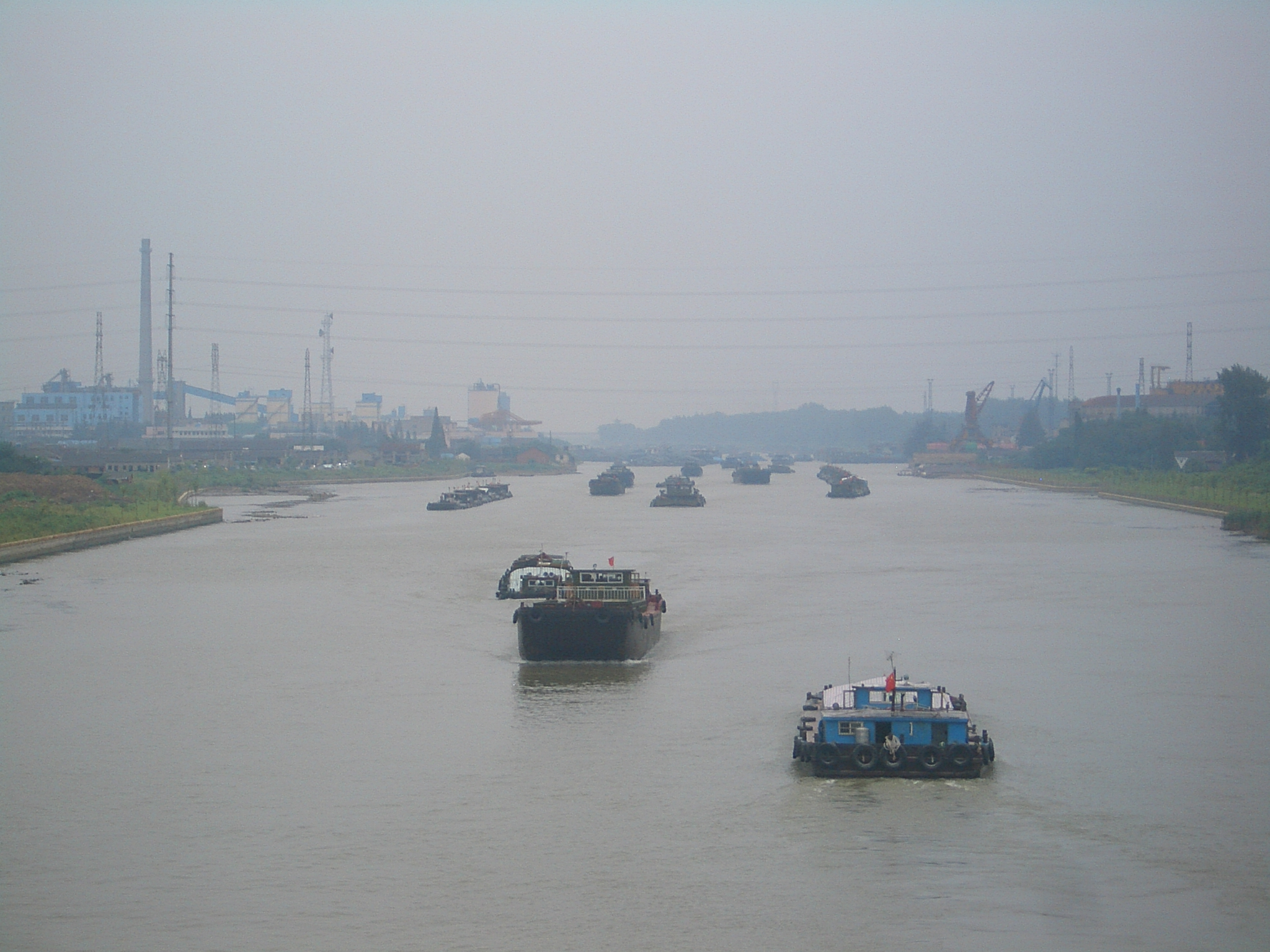
Barges on the modern Grand Canal ("Li Canal" section) near Yangzhou

The Grand Canal nominally runs between Beijing and Hangzhou over a total length of 1,794 km (1,115 mi); however, only the section from Hangzhou to Liangshan County is currently navigable. Its course is today divided into seven sections. From south to north these are the Jiangnan Canal, the Li Canal, the Inner Canal, the Middle Canal, the Lu Canal, the South Canal, the North Canal, and the Tonghui River.

Man-Made Lake Lianhu

Training Lake "Lianhu" was used to feed water to the Grand Canal section near Jiangnan. Since the canal was man-made there was not enough naturally flowing water to keep the canal at proper depth so that boats could travel through it. So a man-made lake was used to feed water to the Jiangnan section of the Grand Canal. It was protected by the Government from reclamation and any use of the lake water without proper taxation was deemed illegal. It was supposed to be protected from profitable exploitation, but because the government changed over the years, Lake Lianhu had been reclaimed many times and it started to become more shallow. The government changed the lake to become more profitable farmland which led to reclamations and agricultural irrigation using the lake. This began to lead to Lake Lianhu not being able to properly feed water to the Grand Canal. Loss of depth due to reclamation and maintenance costs became too high for the lake to become practical to use. Even though it was a man made lake it was still a beautiful sight. Many different people praised its beauty and various poems have been written about the lake. In recent years recreational uses for the lake have become more popular and may lead to the lake being restored.

=== Jiangnan Canal ===
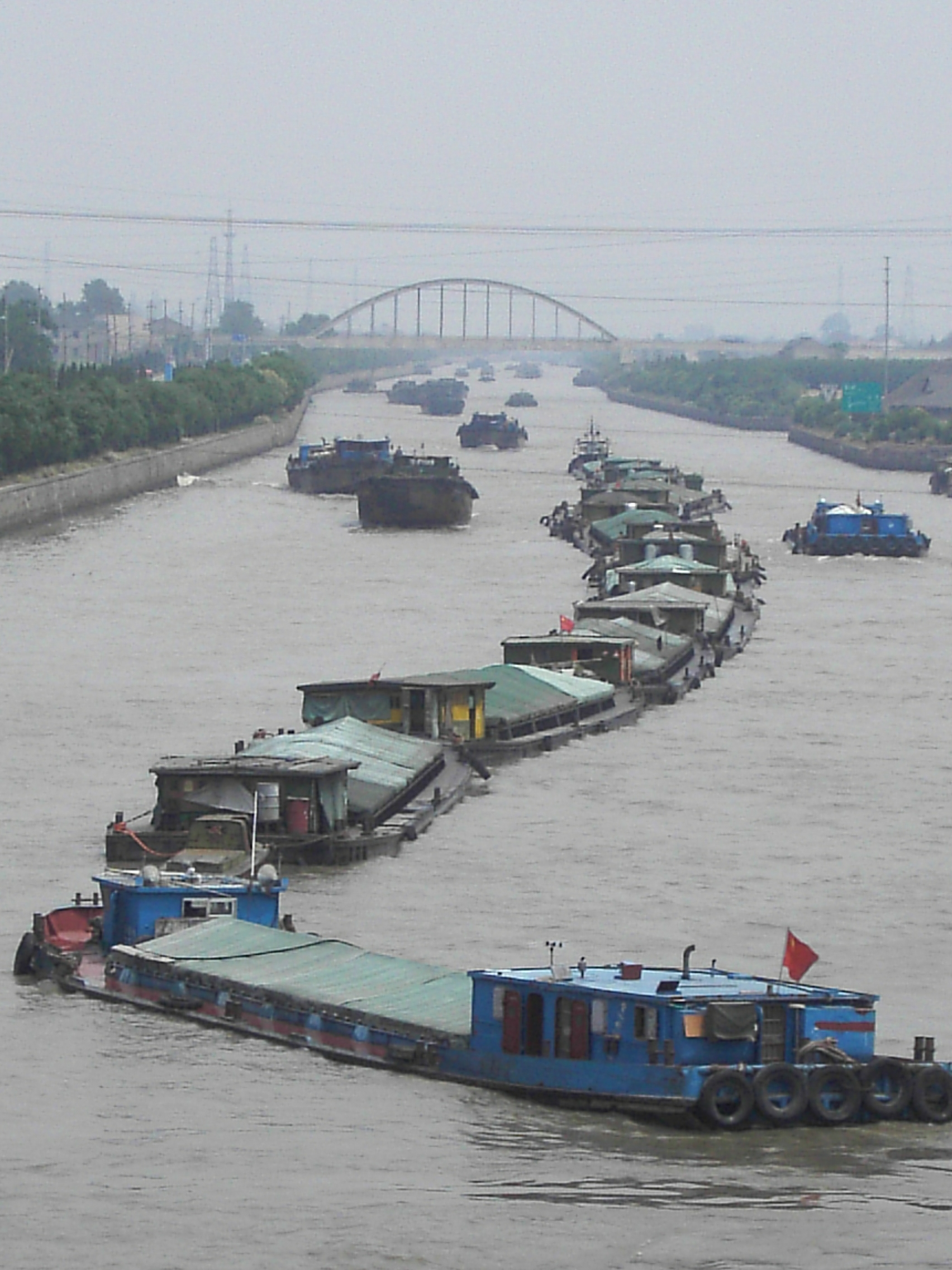
The Jiangnan Canal

This southernmost section of the canal runs from Hangzhou in Zhejiang, where the canal connects with the Qiantang River, to Zhenjiang in Jiangsu, where it meets the Yangtze. After leaving Hangzhou heading north toward Beijing, the canal passes around the eastern border of Lake Tai, through the major cities of Jiaxing, Suzhou, Wuxi, and Changzhou before reaching Zhenjiang.

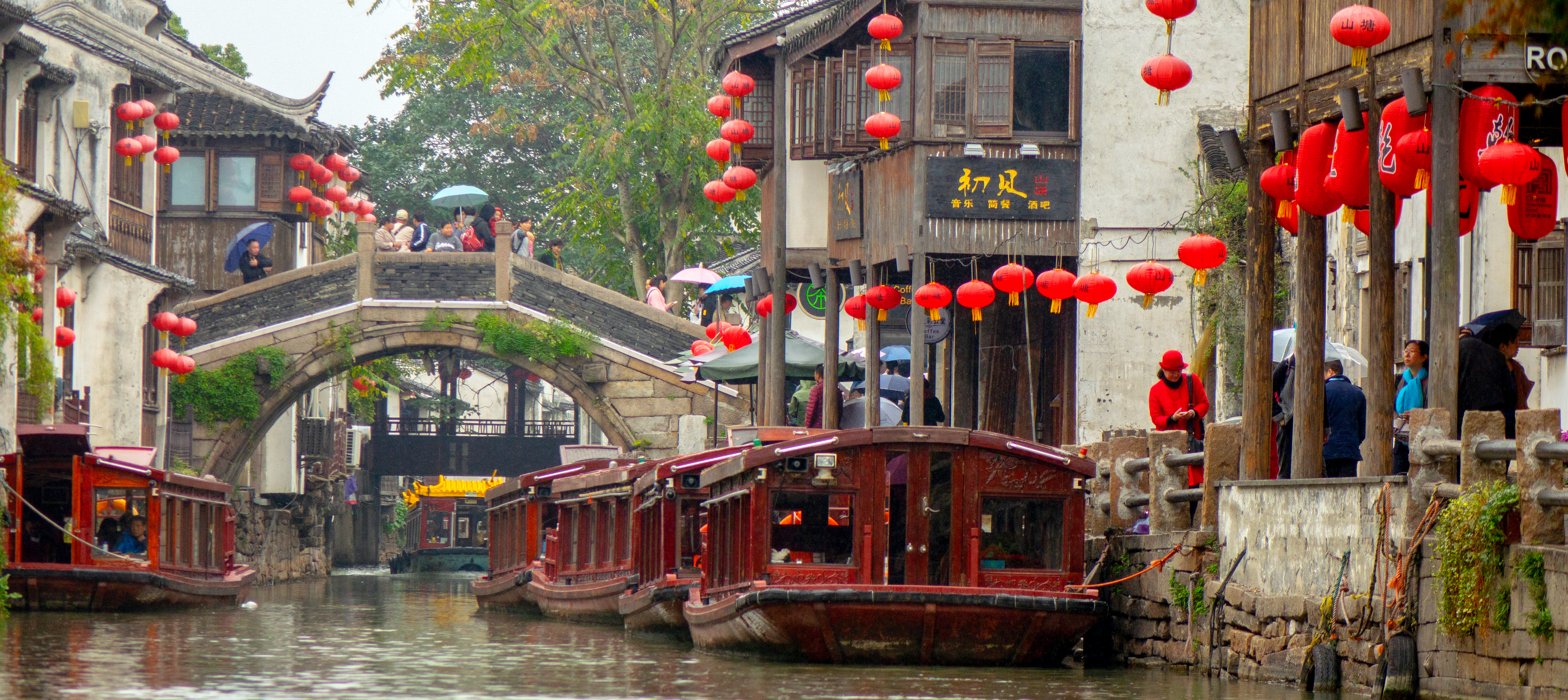
Grand Canal tour boats, Suzhou

The Jiangnan (or 'South of the Yangtze') Canal is heavily utilized by barge traffic bringing coal, containers and construction materials to the booming delta. It is generally a minimum of 100 meters wide in the congested city centers, and often two or three times this width in the neighboring countryside. In recent years, broad bypass canals have been dug around the major cities to reduce 'traffic jams'.

The Suzhou section of the Jiangnan Canal flows through the western part of the city. It includes ten city gates and over 20 stone bridges of traditional design and historic areas that have been well preserved as well as temples and pavilions.

=== Inner Canal ===
The Inner Canal runs between the Yangtze and Huai rivers, skirting the Shaobo, Gaoyou, and Hongze lakes of central Jiangsu. This section connects the cities of Huai'an and Yangzhou. Here the land lying to the west of the canal is higher than its bed while the land to the east is lower. Historically the Shanghe region west of the canal has been prone to frequent flooding, while the Xiahe region to its east has been hit by less frequent but immensely damaging inundations caused by the failure of the Grand Canal levees. Recent works have allowed floodwaters from Shanghe to be diverted safely out to sea. Like the Jiangnan Canal, the Inner Canal is heavily utilized by barge traffic bringing coal, construction materials and increasingly shipping containers around Jiangsu Province.

=== Middle Canal ===
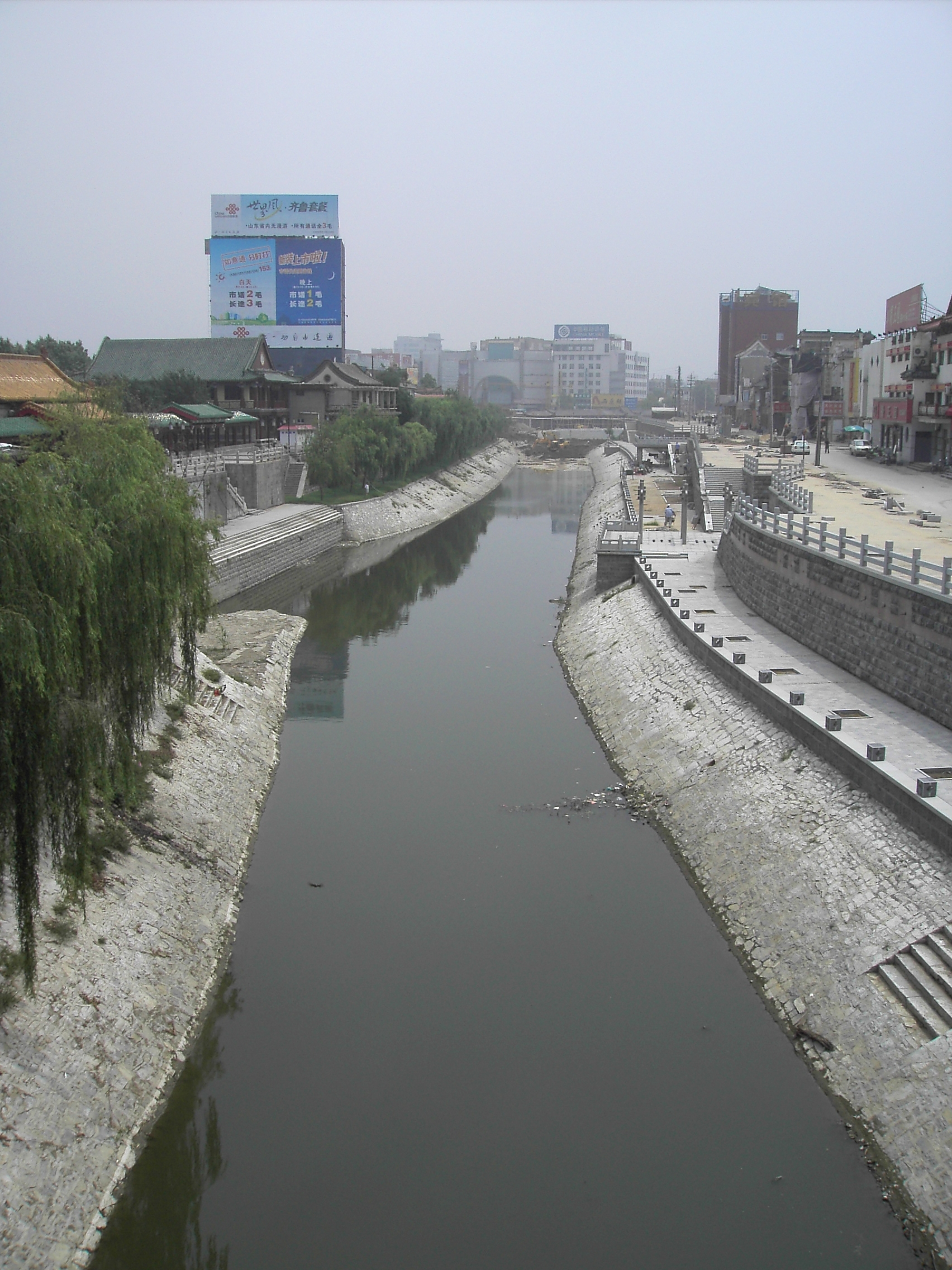
The canal in Jining City

This 'Middle Canal' section runs from Huai'an to Weishan Lake, passing through Luoma Lake and following more than one course, the result of the impact of centuries of Yellow River flooding. After Pizhou, a northerly course passes through Tai'erzhuang to enter Weishan Lake at Hanzhuang bound for Nanyang and Jining (this course is the remnant of the New Nanyang Canal of 1566 – see below). A southerly course passes close by Xuzhou and enters Weishan Lake near Peixian. This latter course is less used today. Canal is utilized by barge traffic bringing coal and construction materials around northern Jiangsu Province.

=== Lu Canal ===
At Weishan Lake, both courses enter Shandong province. From here to Linqing, the canal is called the Lu or 'Shandong' Canal. It crosses a series of lakes—Zhaoyang, Dushan, and Nanyang—which nominally form a continuous body of water. At present, diversions of water mean that the lakes are often largely dry land. North of the northernmost Nanyang Lake is the city of Jining. Further on, about 30 km (19 mi) north of Jining, the highest elevation of the canal (38.5 m or 126 ft above sea level) is reached at the town of Nanwang. In the 1950s a new canal was dug to the south of the old summit section. The old summit section is now dry, while the new canal holds too little water to be navigable. About 50 km (31 mi) further north, passing close by Dongping Lake, the canal reaches the Yellow River. By this point waterless, it no longer connects to the river. It reappears again in Liaocheng City on the north bank where, intermittently flowing through a renovated stone channel, it reaches the city of Linqing on the Shandong – Hebei border. Liangshan County is the northern terminus of the canal for barge traffic.

=== Southern Canal ===
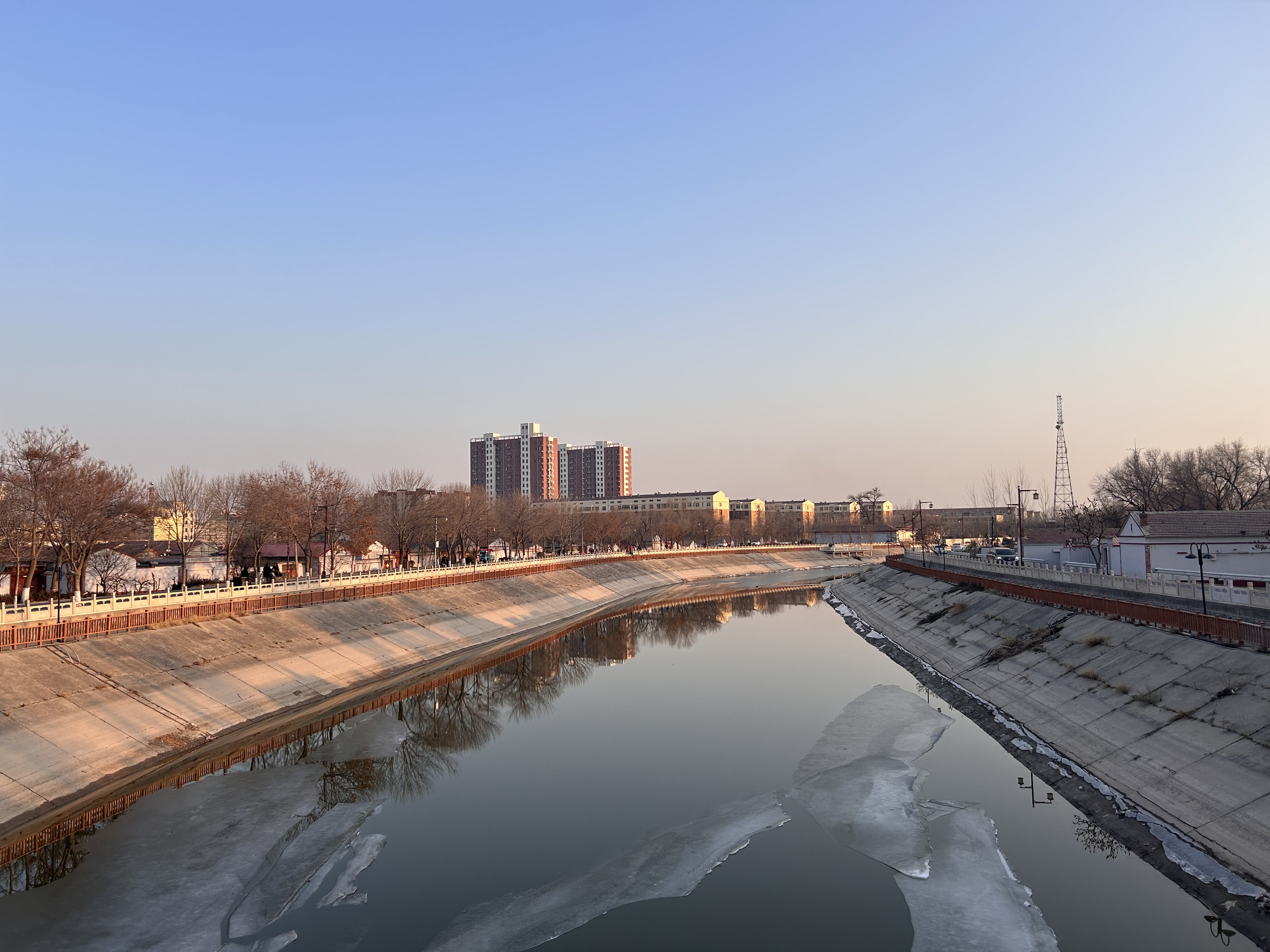
Southern Canal in the Cangzhou, Hebei

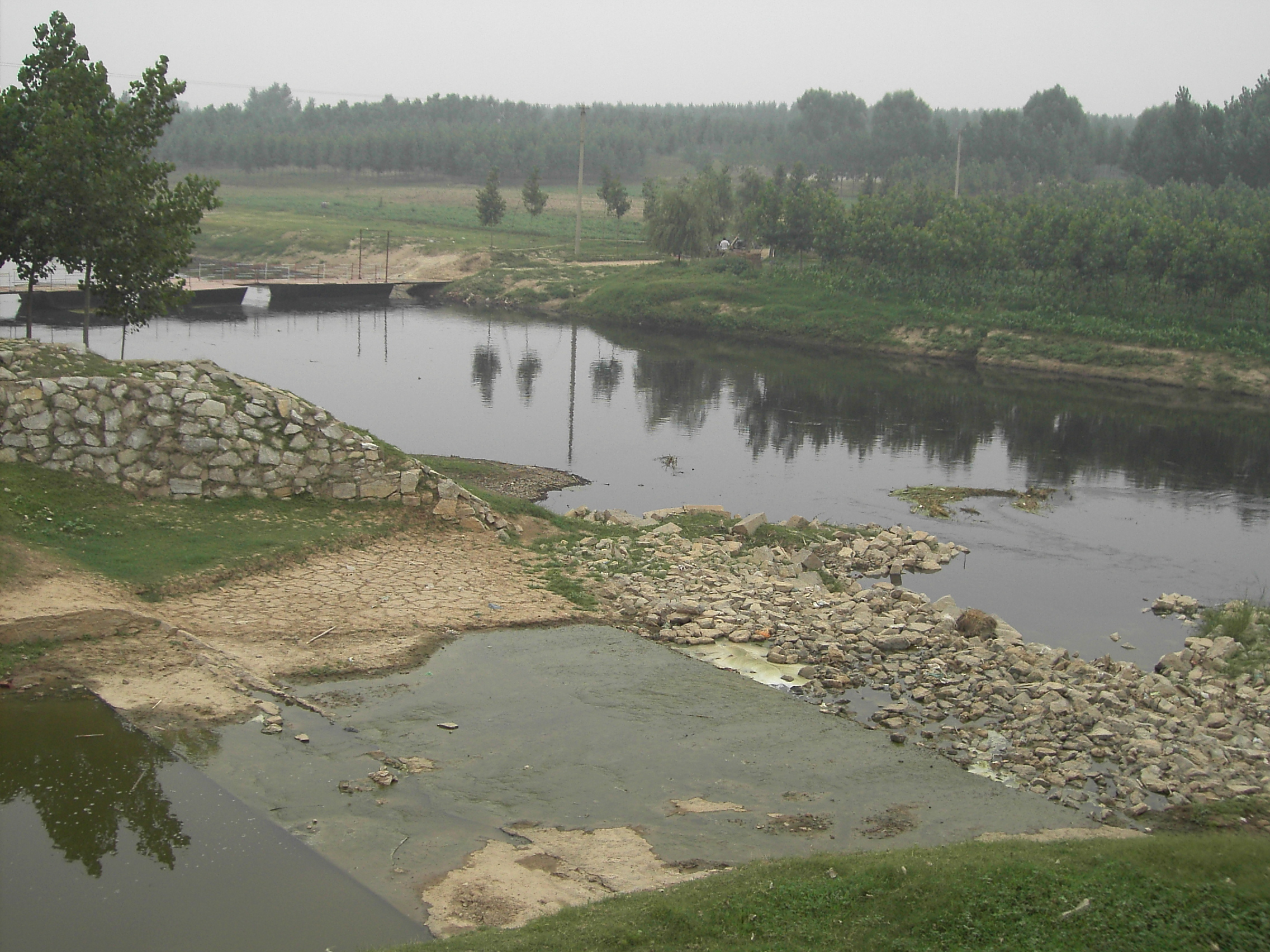
The junction of the Lu Canal and South Canal

The fifth section of the canal extends for a distance of 524 kilometers (326 mi) from Linqing to Tianjin along the course of the canalized Wei River. Though one of the northernmost sections, its name derives from its position relative to Tianjin. The Wei River at this point is heavily polluted while drought and industrial water extraction have left it too low to be navigable. The canal, now in Hebei province, passes through the cities of Dezhou and Cangzhou. Although to spectators, the canal appears to be a deep waterway in these city centers, its depth is maintained by weirs and the canal is all but dry where it passes through the surrounding countryside. At its terminus, the canal joins the Hai River in the center of Tianjin City before turning north-west.

=== Northern Canal and Tonghui River ===
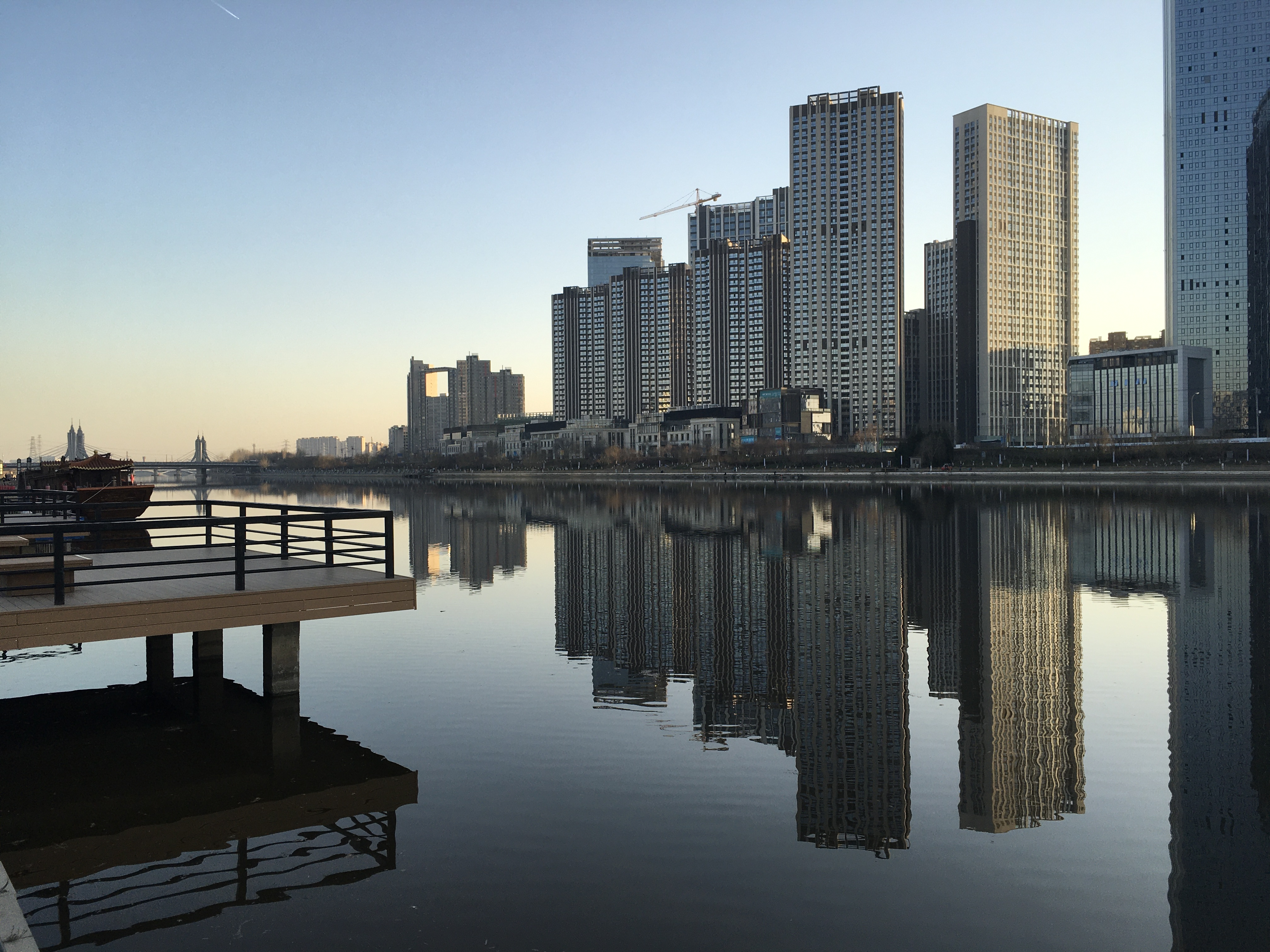
Northern Canal in Tongzhou, Beijing

In Tianjin, the canal heads northwest, for a short time following the course of the Yongding, a tributary of the Hai River, before branching off toward Tongzhou on the edge of the municipality of Beijing. It is here that the modern canal stops and that a Grand Canal Cultural Park has been built. During the Yuan dynasty, a further canal on the Tonghui River connected Tongzhou with a wharf called the Houhai or "rear sea" in central Beijing. In the Ming and Qing dynasties, however, the water level in the Tonghui River dropped and ships could not travel from Tongzhou to Beijing. Tongzhou then became the northern shipping terminus of the canal. Cargo was unloaded at Tongzhou and transported to Beijing by land. The Tonghui river still exists as a wide, concrete-lined storm-channel and drain for the suburbs of Beijing.

=== Eastern Zhejiang Canal ===
The Eastern Zhejiang Canal runs 239 kilometers (149 mi) across the coastal plain south of Hangzhou Bay in northern Zhejiang. It begins at the Qiantang River in Xixing, Binjiang District, Hangzhou; crosses the Cao'e River in Shaoxing; and connects to the Yong River and ports on the East China Sea at Ningbo.

This Hangzhou–Ningbo canal began as the Shanyin Canal excavated in Shaoxing by the Yue official Fan Li in the early 5th century BC during China's Spring and Autumn period. Despite the difficulty of connecting the route's various watersheds, the present route was completed with the construction of the Xixing Canal by the Jin official He Xun in the late 3rd century AD. The canal was an important artery of transport and supply for the region during periods of disunity in medieval China and was particularly prosperous and vital during the Southern Song, who established their capital at Lin'an within present-day Hangzhou. During the Yuan, Ming, and Qing, the canal diminished in importance but was kept navigable until the development of railways and roads in the 19th and 20th century. Renovation of the canal for use by modern barges began in 2002, was completed except for areas around Ningbo by 2009, and was fully completed in late 2013.

In November 2008, the Eastern Zhejiang Canal was added to the Grand Canal's UNESCO nomination and, in May 2013, was officially included as part of the Grand Canal and listed among the 7th group of Major Historical and Cultural Sites Protected at the National Level by the Chinese government. In 2014, it was included with the Beijing–Hangzhou and Sui and Tang canals as part of UNESCO's listing for the Grand Canal.

== Registered Sections and Sites of the World Heritage complex ==
The Grand Canal World Heritage site is composed of 31 sections and a number of accessory heritage sites.

Province	Prefecture	Waterway Section		Subsidiary Heritage sites
Beijing		TH-01	Tonghui Canal's Beijing Old City section (Old Yuhe Canal)	Chengqing Upper Lock, Chengqing Middle Lock, Shichahai
Beijing		TH-02	Tonghui Canal's Tongzhou section	
Tianjin		BY-01	Tianjin Northern and Southern Canal Sanchakou section	
Hebei	Cangzhou	NY-01	Southern Canal's Cangzhou-Hengshui-Dezhou section	Xiejia Dam of Lianzhen, Hujiakou Rammed Earth Critical Levee
Hebei	Hengshui	NY-01	Southern Canal's Cangzhou-Hengshui-Dezhou section	Xiejia Dam of Lianzhen, Hujiakou Rammed Earth Critical Levee
Shandong	Dezhou	NY-01	Southern Canal's Cangzhou-Hengshui-Dezhou section	Xiejia Dam of Lianzhen, Hujiakou Rammed Earth Critical Levee
Shandong	Liaocheng	HT-01	Huitong Canal's Lingqing section	Linqing Customs Hall
Shandong	Liaocheng	HT-02	Huitong Canal's Yanggu section	Echeng Lower Lock, Echeng Upper Lock, Jingmen Lower Lock, Jingmen Upper Lock
Shandong	Taian	HT-03	Nanwang Water Control Complex & Xiaowen Canal	Daicun Dam
Shandong	Jining	HT-03	Nanwang Water Control Complex & Xiaowen Canal	Shili Lock, Xujiankou Doumen Ruins, Xingtong Doumen Ruins, Upper Wenyun Canal Zhuanqi Dike, Liulin Lock, Nanwang Water Diversion Point's Dragon King Temple Ruins, Siqianpu Lock
Shandong	Jining	HT-04	Huitong Canal's Weishan section	Lijian Lock
Shandong	Zaozhuang	ZH-01	Zhongyun Canal's Tai'erzhuang section (old Moon Canal)	
Shandong	Suqian (Note: Suqian is in Anhui, not Shandong, but this is the order in the UNESCO application)	ZH-02	Zhongyun Canal's Suqian section	Temporary Palace at the Dragon King's Temple
Henan	Anyang	WH-01	Yongji Canal's Huaxian-Xunxian section (Weihe canal)	
Henan	Hebi	WH-01	Yongji Canal's Huaxian-Xunxian section (Weihe canal)	
Henan	Hebi	WH-02	Liyang Granary Ruins section	Liyang Granary Ruins
Henan	Luoyang	TJ-01	Hanjia Number 160 Granary Ruins section	
Henan	Luoyang	TJ-02	Huiluo Granary Ruins section	
Henan	Zhengzhou	TJ-03	Tongji Canal's Zhengzhou section	
Henan	Shangqiu	TJ-04	Tongji Canal's Shanqiu Nanguan section	
Henan	Shangqiu	TJ-05	Tongji Canal's Shanqiu Xiayi section	
Anhui	Huaibei	TJ-06	Liuzi Canal's Ruins section	Liuzi Bridge Ruins
Anhui	Suzhou	TJ-07	Tongji Canal's Sixian section	
Jiangsu	Huai'an	HY-01	Qingkuo Water Management Complex; Huaiyang Canal's Huai'an section	Shuangjin Lock, Qingjiang Lock, Hongze Lake Stone Dyke
Jiangsu	Huai'an	HY-02	Minister of Water Transport Hall Ruins	
Jiangsu	Yangzhou	HY-03	Huaiyang Canal's Yangzhou section	Liubao Lock, Yucheng Post, Shaobo Old Dike, Shaobo Wharves, Shouxi Lake, Tianning Temple Temporary Palace, Geyuan, Wang Lumen Residence, Yanzong Temple, Lu Shaoxu Residence
Jiangsu	Changzhou	JN-01	Jiangnan Canal's Changzhou City section	
Jiangsu	Wuxi	JN-02	Jiangnan Canal's Wuxi City section	Qingming Bridge Historical Quarter
Jiangsu	Suzhou	JN-03	江南运河苏州段 Jiangnan Canal Suzhou section	Panmen, Baodai Bridge, Shantang Historical Quarter, Pingjiang Historical Quarter, Wujian Canal Old Towpath
Zhejiang	Huzhou	JN-05	Jiangnan Canal's Nanxun section	Nanxun Ancient City
Zhejiang	Jiaxing	JN-04	Jiangnan Canal's Jiaxing-Hanzhou section	Chang'an Lock Ruins, Changhong Bridge
Zhejiang	Hangzhou	JN-04	Jiangnan Canal's Jiaxing-Hanzhou section	Fengshan Water Gate Ruins, Fuyi Granary, Gongchen Bridge, Guangji Bridge, Qiaoxi Historical Quarter
Zhejiang	Hangzhou	ZD-01	Zhedong Canal's Xiaoshan-Shaoxing section	Ruins of Xixing Wharf and Distribution Center
Zhejiang	Shaoxing	ZD-01	Zhedong Canal's Xiaoshan-Shaoxing section	Bazi Bridge, Bazi Bridge Historical Quarter, Shaoxing Old Towpath
Zhejiang	Shaoxing	ZD-02	Zhedong Canal's Shangyu-Yuyao section (old Yuyu Canal)	
Zhejiang	Ningbo	ZD-02	Zhedong Canal's Shangyu-Yuyao section (old Yuyu Canal)	
Zhejiang	Ningbo	ZD-03	Zhedongyun Canal's Ningbo section	
Zhejiang	Ningbo	ZD-04	Ningbo Sanjiangkou	Qing'an Guild Hall

== Elevations ==
Though the canal nominally crosses the watersheds of five river systems, in reality, the variation between these is so low that it has only a single summit section. The elevation of the canal bed varies from 1 m below sea level at Hangzhou to 38.5 m above at its summit. At Beijing, it reaches 27 m, fed by streams flowing downhill from the mountains to the west. The water flows from Beijing toward Tianjin, from Nanwang north toward Tianjin, and from Nanwang south toward Yangzhou. The water level in the Jiangnan Canal remains scarcely above sea level (the Zhenjiang ridge is 12 meters higher than that of the Yangtze River).

== Uses ==
=== Transportation ===
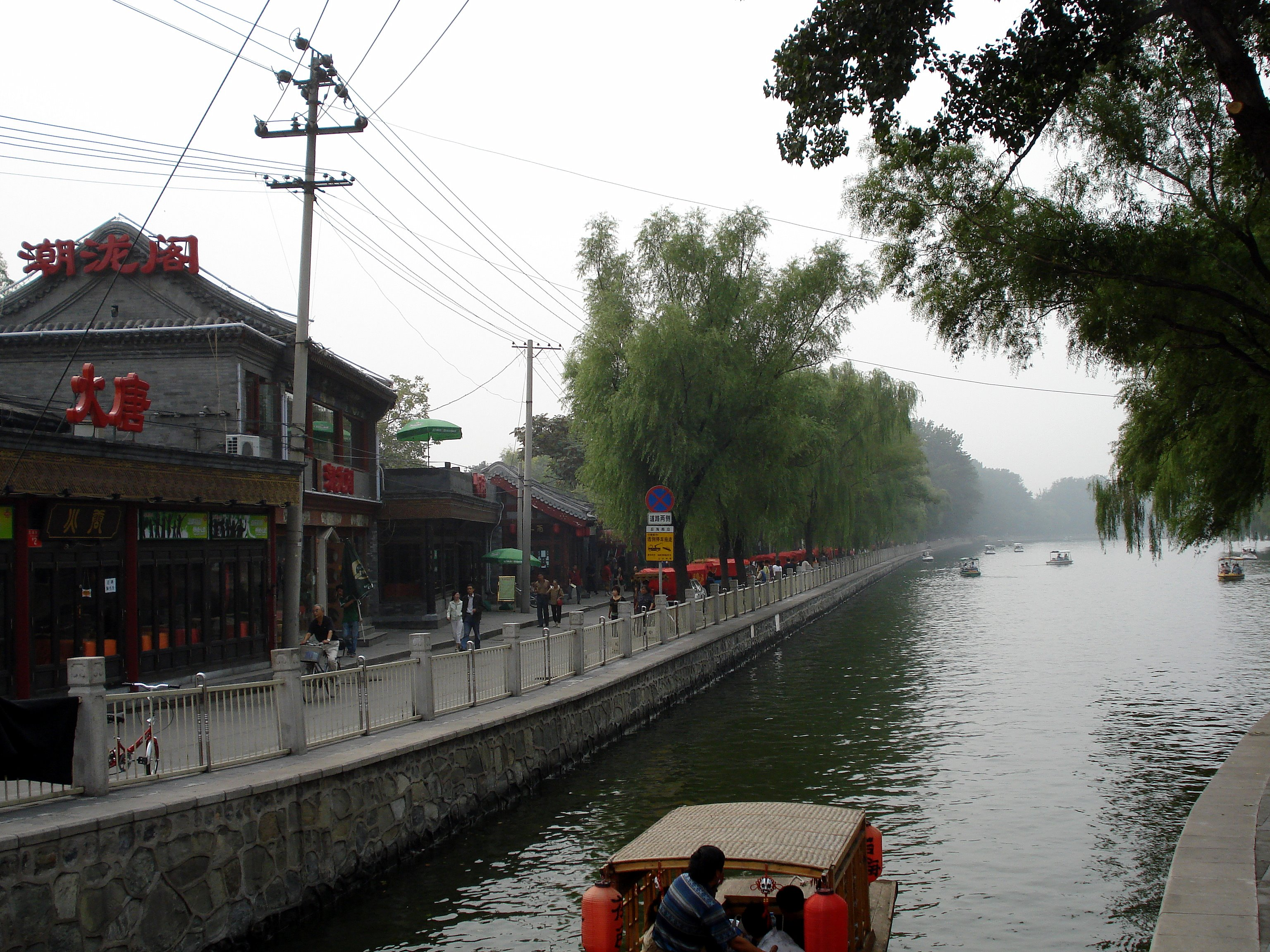
The Grand Canal at its northern terminus at Houhai in Beijing.

From the Tang to Qing dynasties, the Grand Canal served as the main artery between northern and southern China and was essential for the transport of grain to Beijing. Although it was mainly used for shipping grain, it also transported other commodities and the corridor along the canal developed into an important economic belt. Records show that, at its height, every year more than 8,000 boats transported four to six million dan (240,000–360,000 metric tons) of grain. The convenience of transport also enabled rulers to lead inspection tours to southern China. In the Qing dynasty, the Kangxi and Qianlong emperors made twelve trips to the south, on all occasions but one reaching Hangzhou.

The Grand Canal also enabled cultural exchange and political integration to occur between the north and south of China. The canal even made a distinct impression on some of China's early European visitors. Marco Polo recounted the Grand Canal's arched bridges as well as the warehouses and prosperous trade of its cities in the 13th century. The Roman Catholic missionary Matteo Ricci traveled from Nanjing to Beijing along the canal at the end of the 16th century.

Since the founding of the People's Republic of China in 1949, the canal has been used primarily to transport vast amounts of bulk goods such as bricks, gravel, sand, diesel, and coal. The Jianbi ship locks on the Yangtze are currently handling some 75,000,000 metric tons each year, and the Li Canal is forecast to reach 100,000,000 metric tons in the next few years. When first constructed, the canal served as a major source of transportation, linking northern and southern China. With the introduction of expressways, railways and high speed railways in modern China, passenger travel on the canal became far less common.

Currently, ships can only travel up to Jining. The section from Jining to Beijing is not available for transport due to the silt deposit buildup from the Yellow River and lack of water sources. In 2019, plans were announced for restoring transportation up to Tai'an.

=== South-North Water Transfer Project ===
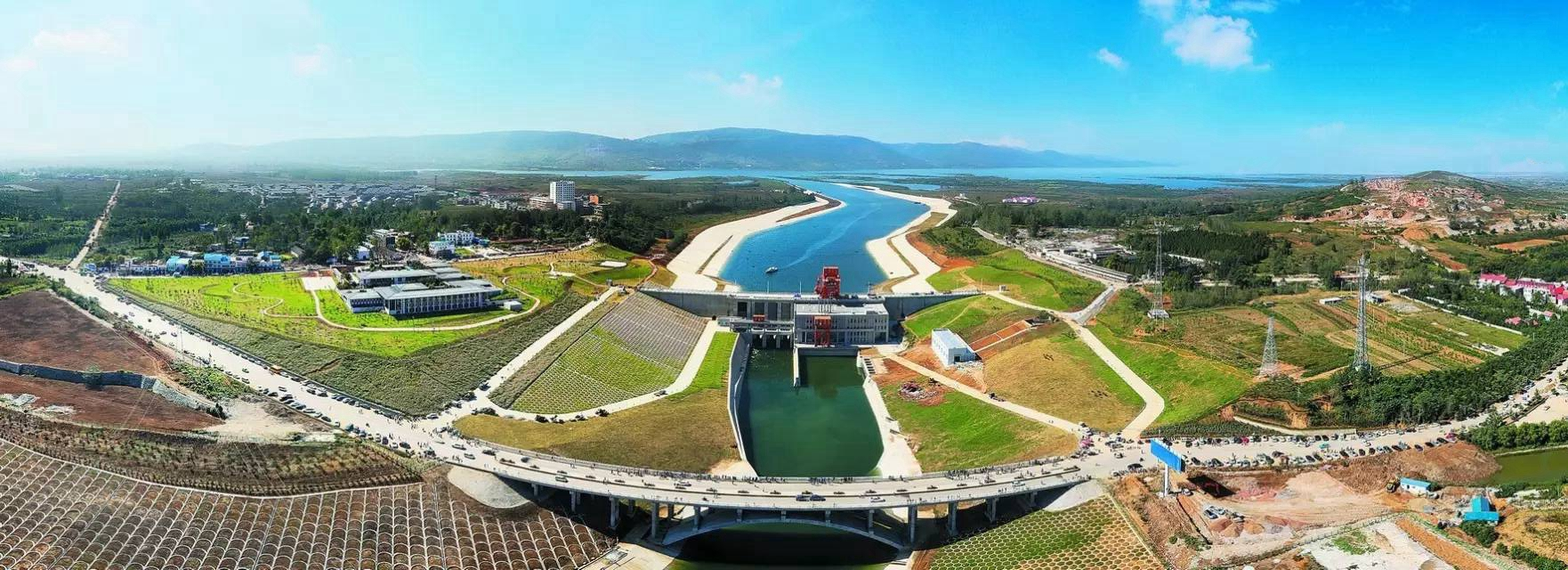
The South–North Water Transfer Project central route starting point in Nanyang. Looking "upstream", toward the Danjiangkou Reservoir, from which the water is coming.

The Grand Canal has been upgraded to serve as the Eastern Route of the South-North Water Transfer Project. Additional water is pumped into the canal from the Yangtze at Jiangdu near Yangzhou using a 400 m^{3}/s (14,000 cu ft/s) pumping station. and repumped through 23 stations until it reaches the watershed at Nanwang. Afterwards the water flows by gravity, one secondary canal going to the Shandong peninsula, and the main canal bypasses the Yellow River through 7.9 km tunnels and flows through a modified route into reservoirs in Tianjin. The extra waterflow has allowed the start of several projects to reestablish shipping in the northern half of the Grand Canal.

== Notable travelers ==
In 1169, with China divided between the Jurchen-led Jin dynasty in the north and the Southern Song dynasty in the south, the Southern Song Emperor Xiaozong sent a delegation to the Jurchen to wish their ruler well for the New Year. A scholar-official named Lou Yue, secretary to the delegation, recorded the journey, much of which was made upon the Grand Canal, and submitted his Diary of a Journey to the North to the emperor on his return.

In 1170, the poet, politician, and historian Lu You traveled along the Grand Canal from Shaoxing to the river Yangtze, recording his progress in a diary.

In the late 1200s, Marco Polo traveled extensively through China and his trips included time on the Grand Canal, then a major artery for shipping silk, porcelain, and wine.

In 1345, Maghrebi traveler Ibn Battuta traveled China and journeyed through the Abe Hayat river (Grand Canal) up to the capital Khanbalik (Beijing).

In 1488, the shipwrecked Korean scholar Choe Bu traveled the entire length of the Grand Canal on his way from Zhejiang to Beijing (and on to Korea) and left a detailed account of his trip.

In 1600, Matteo Ricci traveled to Beijing from Nanjing via the Grand Canal waterway to gain the support of the Wanli Emperor of the Ming dynasty with the help of Wang Zhongde, the Director of the Board of Rites in the central government of China at the time.

In 1793, after a largely fruitless diplomatic mission to Jehol, a large part of Lord Macartney's embassy returned south to the Yangtze delta via the Grand Canal.

In 1848, Robert Fortune reached Hang Chow Foo by the Grand Canal in his quest for tea plants.

== See also ==
- History of canals in China
- Lingqu Canal
- Turpan water system
- Dujiangyan irrigation system
- Economy of China
- Economic history of China (1912–49)
- Economic history of China before 1912
- Economic history of China
- Hydraulic engineering
- History of Beijing
