= China Grand Canal Museum =

Museum in Yangzhou, Jiangsu, China

Coordinates: 32.3642°N 119.4230°E

- 扬州中国大运河博物馆
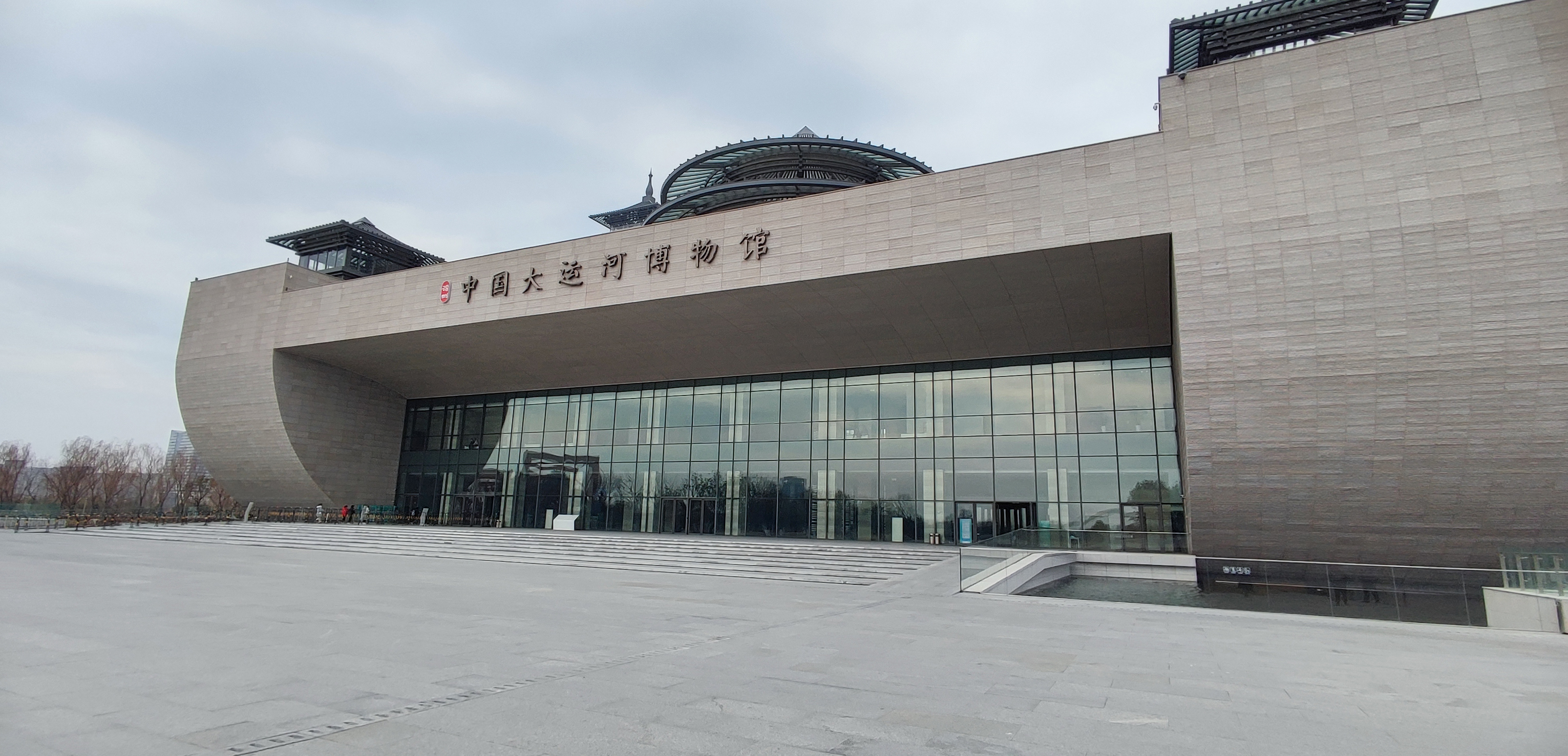
- Main entrance of Yangzhou Grand Canal Museum
- Established: 16 June 2021
- Location: Sanwan wetland park, Yangzhou
- Manager: Jiangsu Provincial Department of Culture and Tourism (Jiangsu Provincial Bureau of Cultural Relics)
- Curator: Jing Zheng
- Owner: Jiangsu Provincial People's Government
- Website: canalmuseum.net

The China Grand Canal Museum (Yangzhou) is a modern, comprehensive museum dedicated to the Grand Canal Heritage Site, located in the Sanwan wetland park in Yangzhou, Jiangsu Province, China. Its main functions include cultural relic preservation, scientific research and exhibition, and public education.

The museum was built in Yangzhou and operated by the Nanjing Museum. It covers an area of about 200 mu (approximately 13.3 hectares) with a total area of about 80,000 square meters and an exhibition area of about 18,000 square meters. It features 11 special exhibitions. The museum showcases the culture of the Grand Canal throughout the entire river basin and at all times. Since opening in 2021, the museum has won a number of industry awards, and welcomes over 4 million visitors a year.

== History ==
China's Grand Canal waterway was inscribed to the UNESCO World Heritage List in June 2014, citing a centuries-long legacy as "a powerful factor of economic and political unification, and a place of major cultural interchanges."

In October of 2018, plans were unveiled for a museum in Yangzhou dedicated to the site; once opened, it was slated to be "the world's largest national park and feature many places of interest, including scenic spots, cultural relics, and ancient and modern water conservancy facilities." The project broke ground in May of 2019, and a commemorative ceremony was held at Yangzhou's Sanwan Park.

- On November 19, 2020, the Yangzhou China Grand Canal Museum was officially named.
- On June 10, 2021, the "Grand Canal Museum Alliance" was officially established.
- On June 16, 2021, the Grand Canal Culture Development Forum and the opening ceremony of the Yangzhou China Grand Canal Museum were held, and the museum officially opened.

== Exhibits ==
=== Permanent Exhibitions ===
- The Grand Canal of China – A World Cultural Heritage Site
- Boats on the Canal
- Born from the Canal – Impressions of Ancient Cities

=== Thematic Exhibitions ===
- Major World Canals and Canal Cities
- Epic Scroll of the Grand Canal of China
- Wetland Wonders
- Intangible Cultural Heritage Along the Grand Canal
- Forbidden City and the Grand Canal
- Emperor Yang of Sui and the Grand Canal
- Water Flows Left and Right, the Youth Yearns Day and Night
- Grand Canal Mystery for a Ming Dynasty Water Supervisor

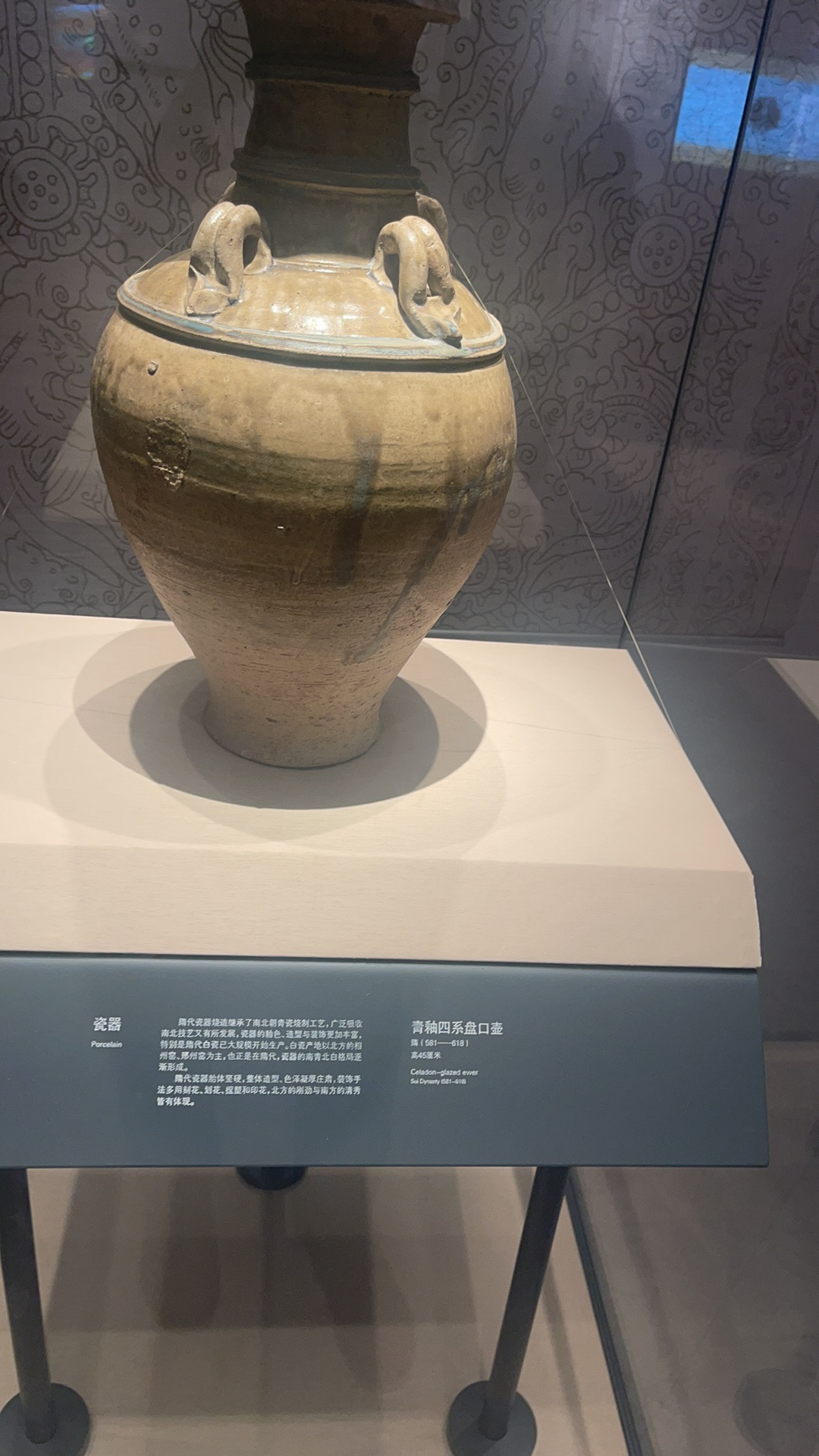
Emperor Yang of Sui and the Grand Canal

=== Temporary and Special Exhibitions ===
- Canal Wonderland — A VR Large-scale Immersive Exploration Exhibition
- So Long, So Rich: Huang Yongyu’s New Works Exhibition
- Fu Baoshi and Related Artists – Special Exhibition of Fine Collections of Jiangsu Traditional Chinese Painting Institute
- Set Out from the Canal: The 2022–2024’s Collection Exhibition of the China Grand Canal Museum
- Sailing Through Thousands of Twists and Turns — Maiji Miraculous Heritage Along the Silk Road
- Canal-Inspired Culture — Public Art Exhibition at Dayun Tower
- Defining Avant-Garde – Russian Avant-Garde Art from the State Russian Museum
- “Venice Revealed” Immersive Digital Exhibition
- Carrying Through the Ages: Exhibition of Significant Archaeological Discoveries Along the Grand Canal in the New Era
- Emotions and Dreams: The Vigorous Four Seasons in Qi Baishi’s Paintings
