= Nanwang =

Town in Shandong, China

Nanwang (南旺镇; Nánwàngzhèn) is a town in Wenshang County in the prefecture-level city of Jining city in Shandong province, China.

The area around Nanwang was the highest point for the historical Grand Canal, and with beginning 1411 the Nanwang water division system was created to control the water flow.
