= Luoma Lake =

- 骆马湖 (Chinese)
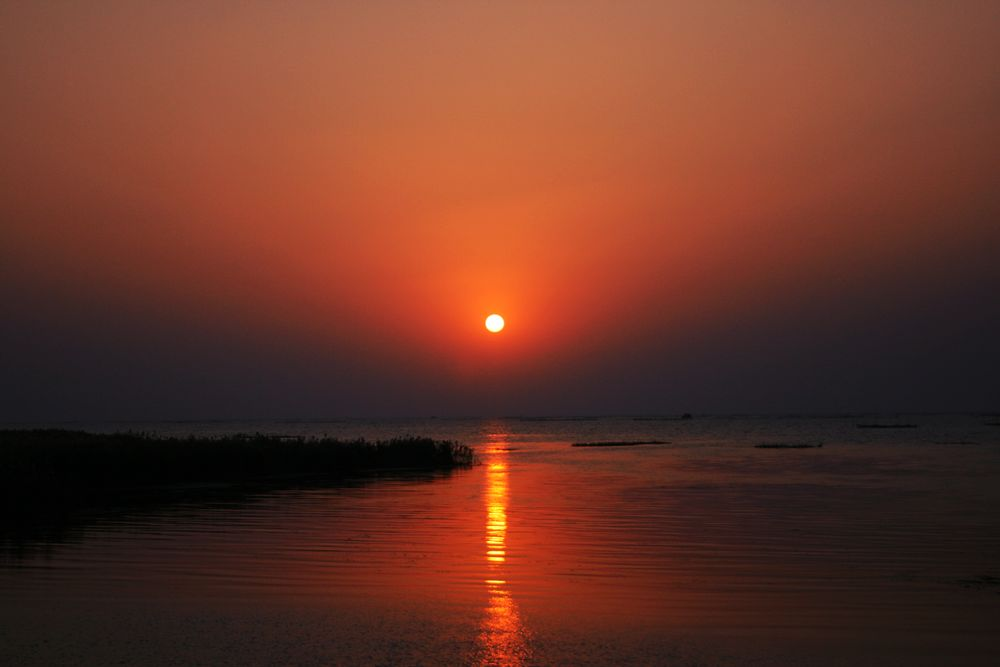

- Location within Jiangsu
- Location: Suqian and Xuzhou; Jiangsu
- Coordinates: 34.09°N 118.18°E
- Type: freshwater lake and semi-artificial reservoir
- Primary inflows: Grand Canal; Yellow River (previously)
- Primary outflows: Grand Canal; Xinyi River; Yi River; Yellow River (previously)
- Basin countries: China
- Max. length: 27 km (17 mi)
- Max. width: 20 km (12 mi)
- Surface area: 375 km^{2} (145 sq mi)
- Average depth: 3.32 m (10.9 ft)
- Max. depth: 5.5 m (18 ft)
- Water volume: 270,000,000 m^{3} (9.5×10^{9} cu ft)
- Islands: more than 60
- Settlements: Xinyi; Suqian

Luoma Lake
- Simplified Chinese: 骆马湖
- Traditional Chinese: 駱馬湖
Transcriptions
Standard Mandarin
- Hanyu Pinyin: Luòmǎ Hú

Alternate names
- Simplified Chinese: 乐马湖
- Traditional Chinese: 樂馬湖
Transcriptions
Standard Mandarin
- Hanyu Pinyin: Lèmǎ Hú

Alternative Chinese name
- Simplified Chinese: 洛马湖
- Traditional Chinese: 洛馬湖
Transcriptions
Standard Mandarin
- Hanyu Pinyin: Luòmǎ Hú

Second alternative Chinese name
- Simplified Chinese: 马乐湖
- Traditional Chinese: 馬樂湖
Transcriptions
Standard Mandarin
- Hanyu Pinyin: Mǎlè Hú

Luoma Lake (Chinese: 骆马湖) is located in central Jiangsu province, China, northwest of Suqian. In an average year, the lake, connecting with the Grand Canal, takes up an area of 375 square kilometers. In Jiangsu, it is perceived as one of the four major freshwater lakes. Besides its historical values, it is currently known as a travel destination; it is listed as one of the main attractions for tourists visiting the city of Suqian.

== Origin ==
Currently, most people in the city believe that Luoma Lake gets its name from its shape, which looks like the backbone of a horse. They insist that this lake is formed by nature. Indeed, Luoma Lake was initially formed as a tectonic lake and enlarged by the change of river system. Due to the change in the course of the Yellow River which temporarily merged with the Si River and Huai River between the Song and Qing dynasties, the Yellow River flooded this area for several times and enlarged the surface area of Luoma Lake. During the past 300 years, the Yellow River brought sediments into Luoma Lake and created depositions inside the lake. In the 1950s, dams were constructed around the lake and made the lake a larger semi-artificial reservoir.

== History ==
The history of Luoma Lake can be traced back to the period of Gaozong of Song. According to his autobiography, he came to this place and named it as Luoma, which literally means horse backbone. Because "Luoma" shares the same pronunciation with the phrase "being removed from office due to corruption" in Mandarin Chinese, the county government of Xinyi renamed it "Longma Lake", which has been boycotted by local people.

== Ecosystem ==
Due to its temperature and humidity appropriate for living, several species inhabit in Luoma Lake. Those species include phragmites, nelumbo nucifera, silver carp, Chinese white shrimp, and crab.

=== Cyanobacteria Community ===
A study was conducted in Luoma Lake in 2015 to investigate the factors that influence the cyanobacteria abundance. It suggests that this abundance has a positive relationship with the concentration of ammonium and a negative one with oxygen concentration.
