= Yucheng Postal Stop =

Coordinates: 32°46′21″N 119°25′57″E

- 盂城驿
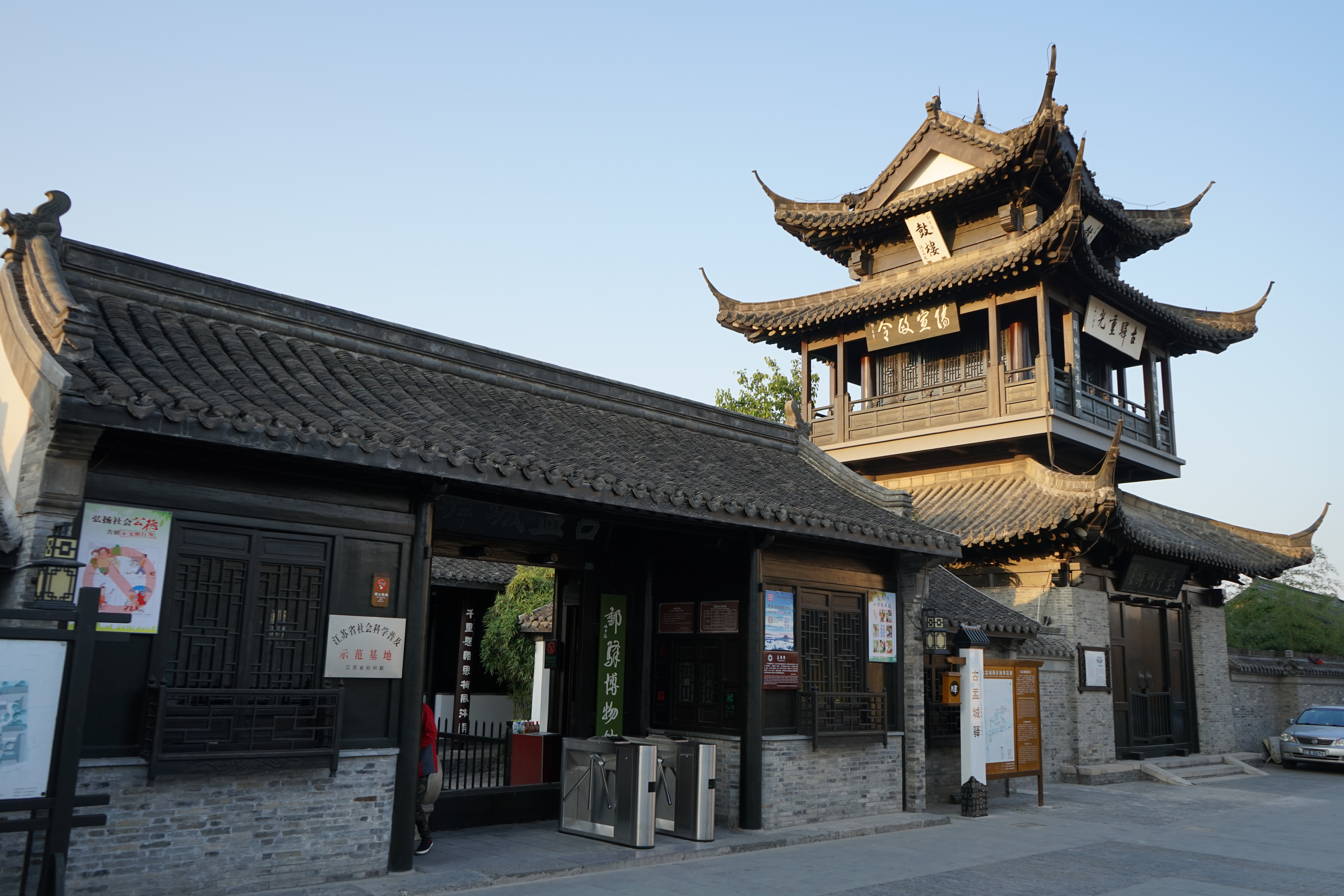
- Interactive map of the Yucheng Postal Stop area

General information
- Location: No.9, Postal Lane, South Gate Street of Gaoyou city, Gaoyou, Jiangsu Province, China
- Completed: 14th century

Yucheng Postal Stop ( simplified Chinese: 盂城驿; traditional Chinese: 盂城驛; pinyin: Yúchéng yì ), also called Yucheng Post is located in the Postal Lane outside the South Gate of Gaoyou, Jiangsu, China, west of the Grand Canal. It is currently the largest, and most completely preserved, ancient courier station in China, where couriers changed horses and rested. The stop has been listed in the fourth group of National Key Cultural Relics Protection Units since 1996.

== History ==
The Postal Stop was built in 1375 during the Ming dynasty.It derives its name from a line by Qin Guan, who was a famous poet in the Song dynasty: "My hometown Gaoyou is shaped like an upside down bowl and it is located on the higher altitude of the Yangzhou and Chuzhou District." (i.e. In Chinese, the word "Yu" in the "Yucheng Postal Stop" means an upside down bowl and "Yucheng" is also the nickname of Gaoyou city. The original line is: "吾乡如覆盂，地处扬楚脊".)

It was renovated during the Yongle era in the Ming dynasty, but was later destroyed in a fire in 1557. Then in 1568, renovations were made again. In the Qing dynasty, three emperors, namely the Kangxi, Jiaqing and Daoguang emperors, all had it carefully restored.

At present, the Yucheng Postal Stop occupies an area of 3,000 m^{2} and consists of the entrance hall, the front hall as well as the back hall. Among the extant buildings, the entrance hall was built in the middle of the Qing dynasty, the back hall in the late Ming dynasty, and the rest in the late Qing dynasty. Large-scale repair and expansion were carried out in 1890. The post was abandoned after the founding of the Republic of China in 1911.

Yucheng Postal Stop is now open to the public as the Museum of Chinese Postal History.
