= Wenshang County =

Wenshang County 汶上县
- County
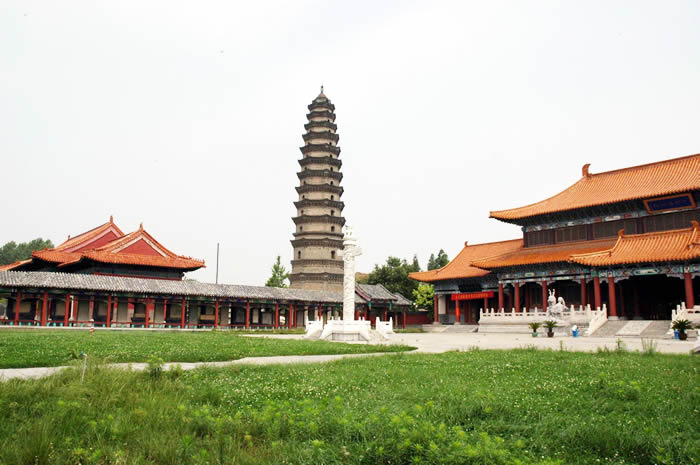
- A pagoda in Wenshang

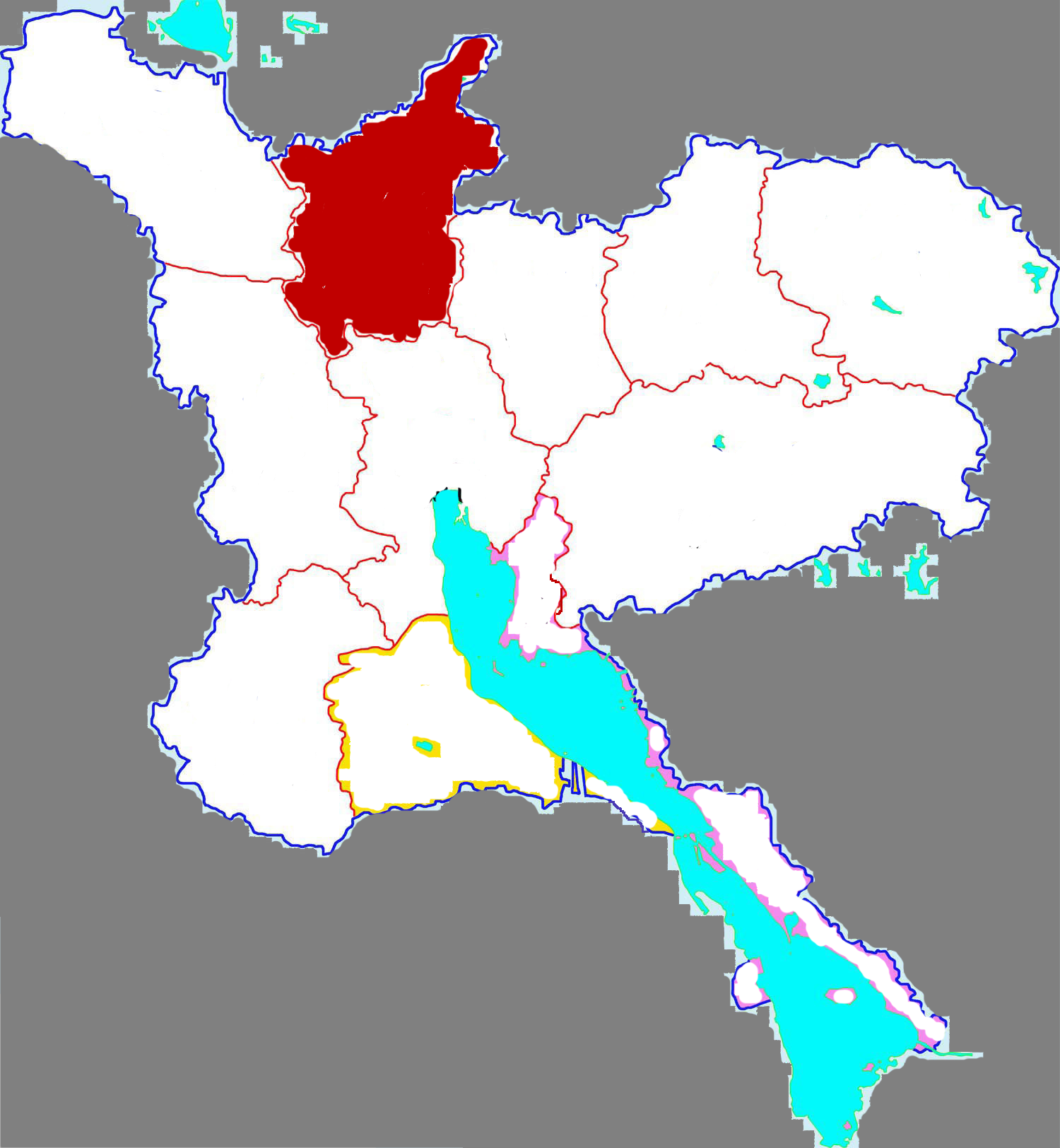
- Location in Jining

- Location in Shandong
- Coordinates: 35.733°N 116.489°E
- Country: People's Republic of China
- Province: Shandong
- Prefecture-level city: Jining

Area
  - Total: 877 km^{2} (339 sq mi)
- Elevation: 43 m (141 ft)

Population (2019)
  - Total: 824,710
  - Density: 940/km^{2} (2,440/sq mi)
- Time zone: UTC+8 (China Standard)
- Postal code: 272500

Wenshang County (simplified Chinese: 汶上县; traditional Chinese: 汶上縣; pinyin: Wénshàng Xiàn) is a county of southwestern Shandong province, People's Republic of China. It is under the administration of Jining City. The population was 725,971 in 1999.

== History ==
The northern area of Wenshang County was the state of Cheng (郕) during the Zhou dynasty in the first millennium BC. In some Chinese legends, it was the location where Jie, the last king of the Xia, was caught and deposed by Wuzi after the Battle of Mingtiao, initiating the Shang under its King Tang c. 1600 BC.

== Administrative divisions ==
As of 2012, this county is divided to 2 subdistricts, 7 towns and 6 townships.

Subdistricts

- Wenshang Subdistrict (汶上街道)
- Zhongdu Subdistrict (中都街道)

Towns

- Nanzhan (南站镇)
- Nanwang (南旺镇)
- Ciqiu (次丘镇)
- Yinsi (寅寺镇)
- Guolou (郭楼镇)
- Kangyi (康驿镇)
- Yuanzhuang (苑庄镇)

Townships

- Yiqiao Township (义桥乡)
- Liulou Township (刘楼乡)
- Guocang Township (郭仓乡)
- Yangdian Township (杨店乡)
- Juntun Township (军屯乡)
- Baishi Township (白石乡)

== Climate ==
Climate data for Wenshang, elevation 42 m (138 ft), (1991–2020 normals, extremes 1966–2010)
Month	Jan	Feb	Mar	Apr	May	Jun	Jul	Aug	Sep	Oct	Nov	Dec	Year
Record high °C (°F)	16.0 (60.8)	22.5 (72.5)	28.0 (82.4)	31.4 (88.5)	36.0 (96.8)	39.9 (103.8)	42.5 (108.5)	36.8 (98.2)	35.9 (96.6)	36.2 (97.2)	25.8 (78.4)	18.7 (65.7)	42.5 (108.5)
Mean daily maximum °C (°F)	4.9 (40.8)	8.8 (47.8)	14.8 (58.6)	21.1 (70.0)	26.5 (79.7)	31.7 (89.1)	32.0 (89.6)	30.7 (87.3)	27.2 (81.0)	21.6 (70.9)	13.2 (55.8)	6.5 (43.7)	19.9 (67.9)
Daily mean °C (°F)	−1.0 (30.2)	2.4 (36.3)	8.3 (46.9)	14.7 (58.5)	20.3 (68.5)	25.5 (77.9)	27.2 (81.0)	25.8 (78.4)	21.2 (70.2)	15.0 (59.0)	7.3 (45.1)	0.8 (33.4)	14.0 (57.1)
Mean daily minimum °C (°F)	−5.5 (22.1)	−2.6 (27.3)	2.6 (36.7)	8.7 (47.7)	14.3 (57.7)	19.8 (67.6)	23.2 (73.8)	22.0 (71.6)	16.4 (61.5)	9.9 (49.8)	2.6 (36.7)	−3.5 (25.7)	9.0 (48.2)
Record low °C (°F)	−18.1 (−0.6)	−15.7 (3.7)	−12.3 (9.9)	−3.3 (26.1)	1.0 (33.8)	9.6 (49.3)	16.2 (61.2)	12.4 (54.3)	3.4 (38.1)	−3.5 (25.7)	−15.1 (4.8)	−14.4 (6.1)	−18.1 (−0.6)
Average precipitation mm (inches)	6.2 (0.24)	11.3 (0.44)	15.2 (0.60)	35.6 (1.40)	54.5 (2.15)	83.3 (3.28)	164.5 (6.48)	142.3 (5.60)	62.3 (2.45)	31.2 (1.23)	28.8 (1.13)	8.2 (0.32)	643.4 (25.32)
Average precipitation days (≥ 0.1 mm)	2.6	3.4	3.4	5.3	6.4	7.5	10.8	10.0	7.0	5.1	4.9	3.0	69.4
Average snowy days	2.6	2.4	0.6	0.1	0	0	0	0	0	0	0.8	1.6	8.1
Average relative humidity (%)	64	60	58	64	68	64	79	83	77	71	70	68	69
Mean monthly sunshine hours	143.6	151.0	197.4	223.4	244.1	218.2	192.9	191.5	183.8	180.6	153.4	145.4	2,225.3
Percentage possible sunshine	46	49	53	57	56	50	44	46	50	52	50	48	50
Source: China Meteorological Administrationall-time extremes

== See also ==
- Zhoucheng Subdistrict
