= Bazi Bridge =

Bazi Bridge 八字桥
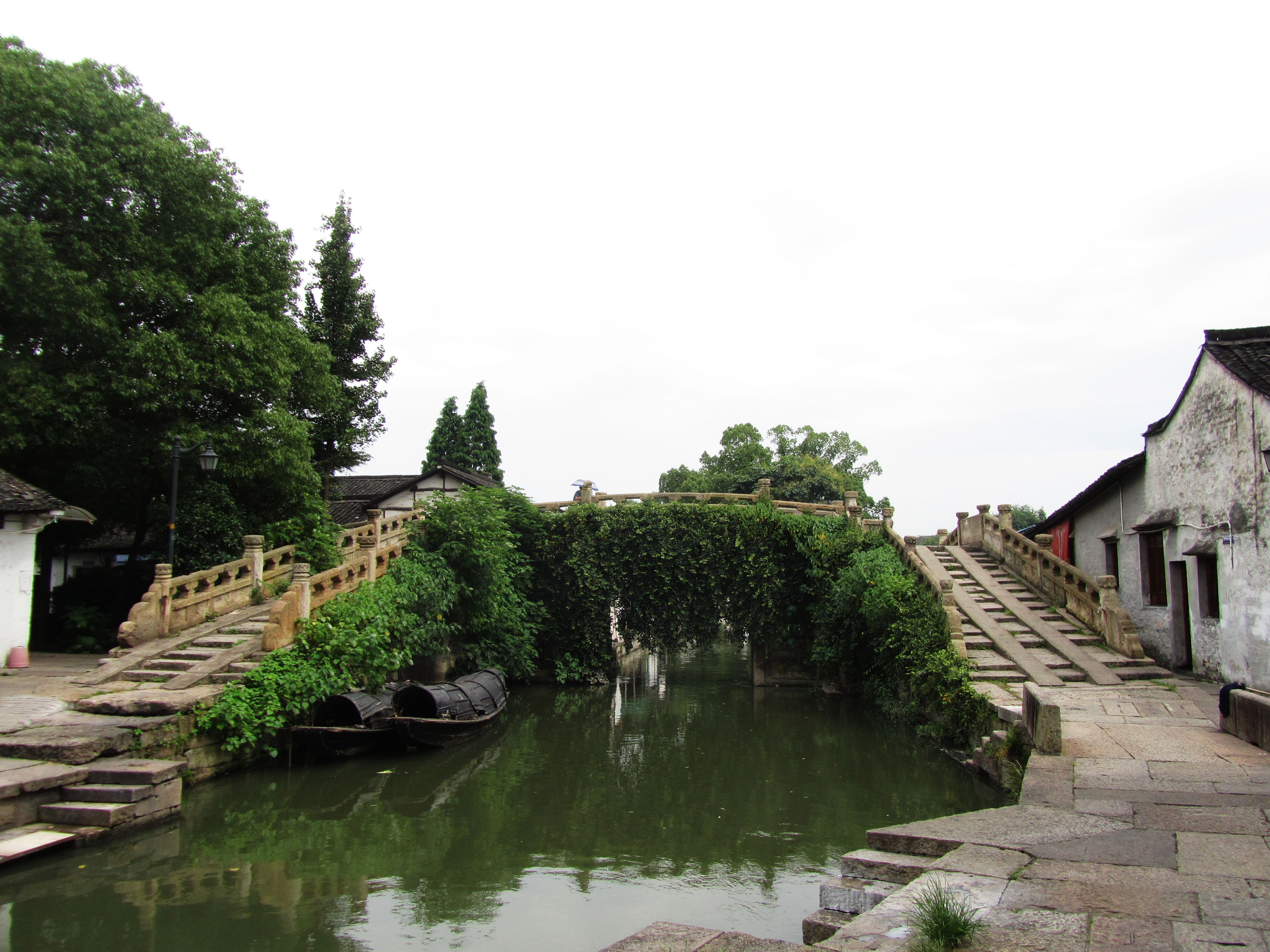
- View of Bazi Bridge from South, in July 2012.
- Coordinates: 30°00′08.09″N 120°35′15.98″E
- Locale: Shaoxing, Zhejiang, China

Characteristics
- Design: Arch Bridge
- Material: Stone
- Total length: 27 metres (89 ft)
- Width: 3.2 metres (10 ft)
- Height: 5 metres (16 ft)
- Longest span: 4.5 metres (15 ft)

History
- Construction start: 1256
- Construction end: 1256
- Opened: 1256

The Bazi Bridge (simplified Chinese: 八字桥; traditional Chinese: 八字橋; pinyin: Bāzì Qiáo) is a stone arch bridge in Shaoxing, Zhejiang, China. The bridge is named for its shape like the Chinese character "八" ("eight").

== History ==
The bridge was originally built in the Jiatai period (1201–1204) of the Song dynasty (960–1279). It was rebuilt in 1256 during the ruling of Emperor Lizong. In 1763, in the reign of Qianlong Emperor in the Qing dynasty (1644–1911), it was repaired and renovated. The last maintenance was in 1982. On June 25, 2001, it was listed among the fifth group of "Major National Historical and Cultural Sites in Zhejiang" by the State Council of China.

== Architecture ==
The bridge is 27 metres (89 ft) in length, 5 metres (16 ft) in height, 3.2 metres (10 ft) in width and 4.5 metres (15 ft) in span.
