= The Earth Suspended River =

The Earth Suspended River (地上悬河 is located in the lower reaches of the Yellow River, which is a world-famous geographical landscape. Also known as 'the raised bed river', its bed is more than 3 metres higher than the ground. In some places, the water level is even about 10 metres higher than the ground.

The Yellow River is known for being sandy with very high sediment concentration. The reasons are the ascent of this reach is not big, both sides of the river are open, and the current is gentle too. Above all, the sand deposits constantly in the bed. In history, the region was hit by floods frequently, so people built levees for the purpose of governing the floods. As a result, the water level increased continuously year by year. After accumulation of over 300 years, the reach becomes what it is now.
