= Shandong =

Province in East China

Shandong 山东
- Province

Name transcription(s)
  - Chinese: 山东省 Shāndōng shěng
  - Abbreviation: SD / 鲁 Lǔ
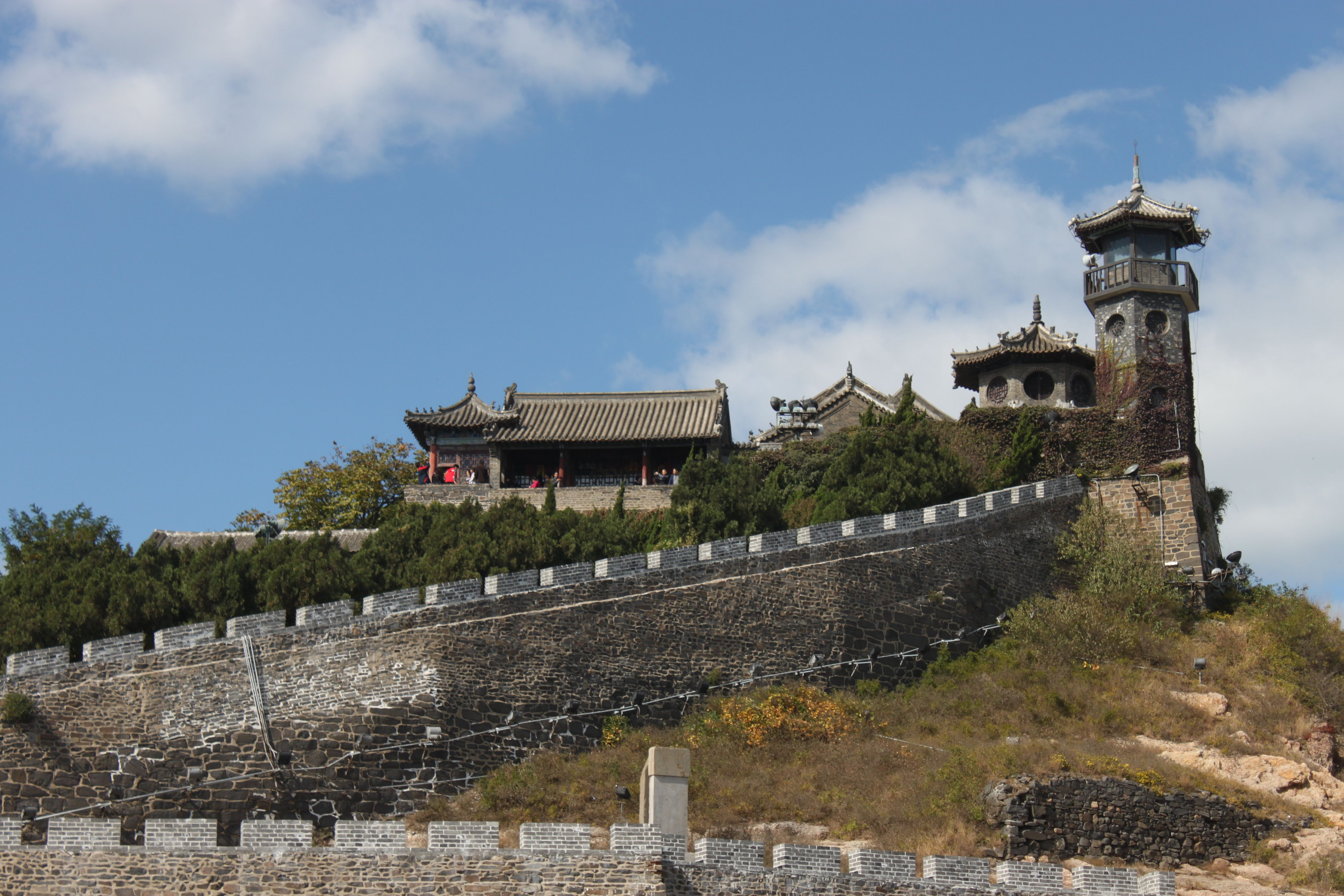
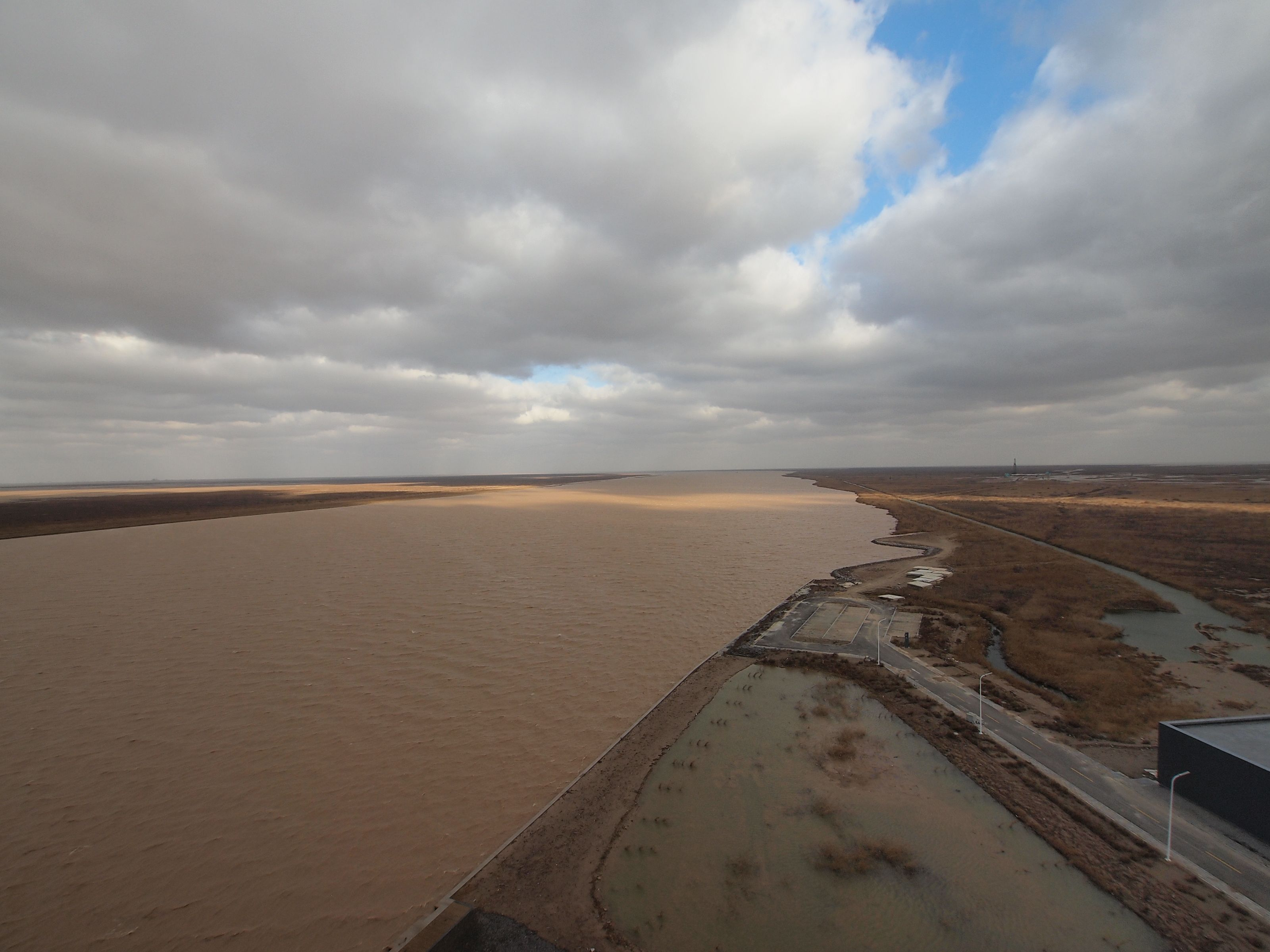
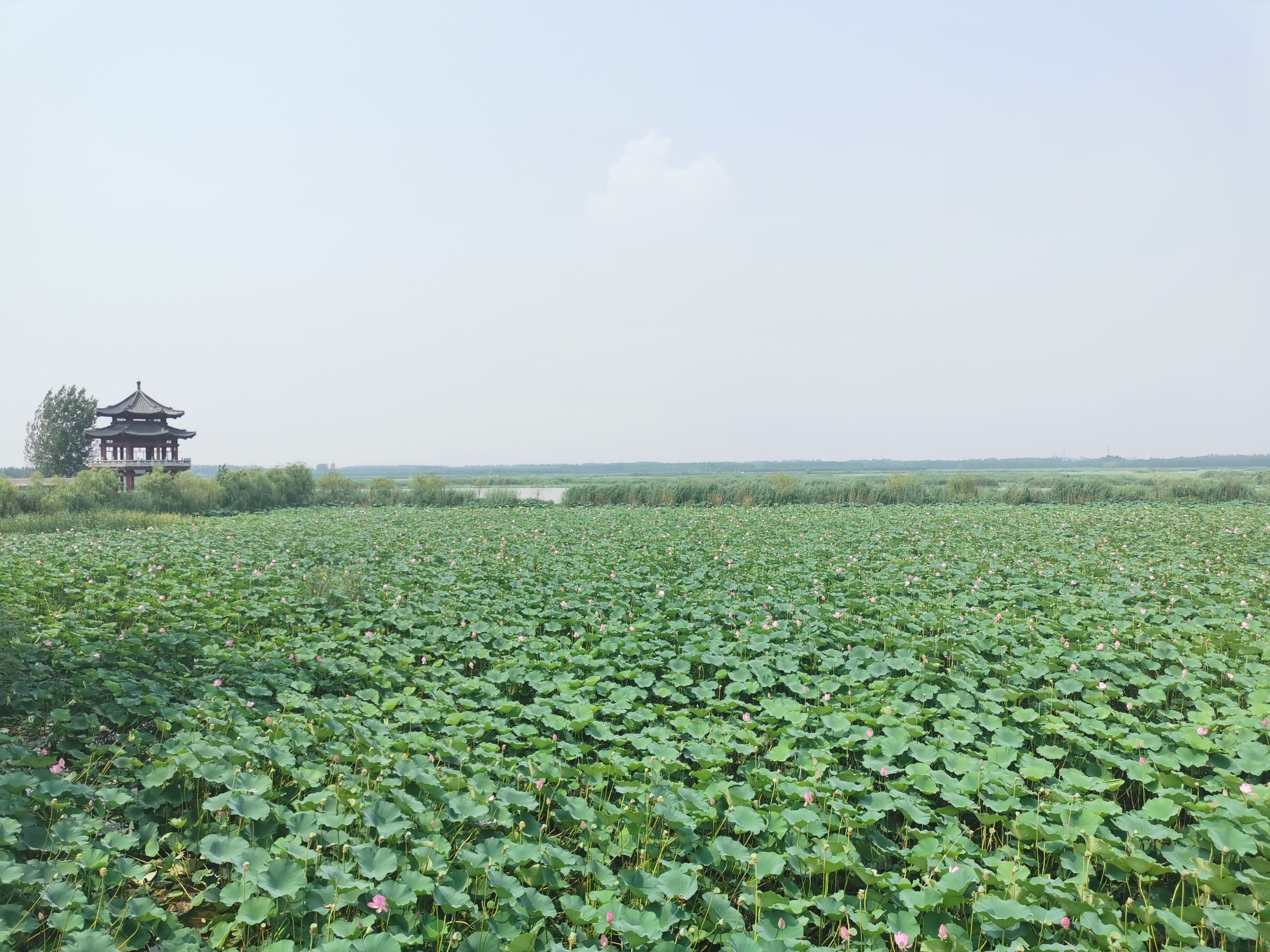
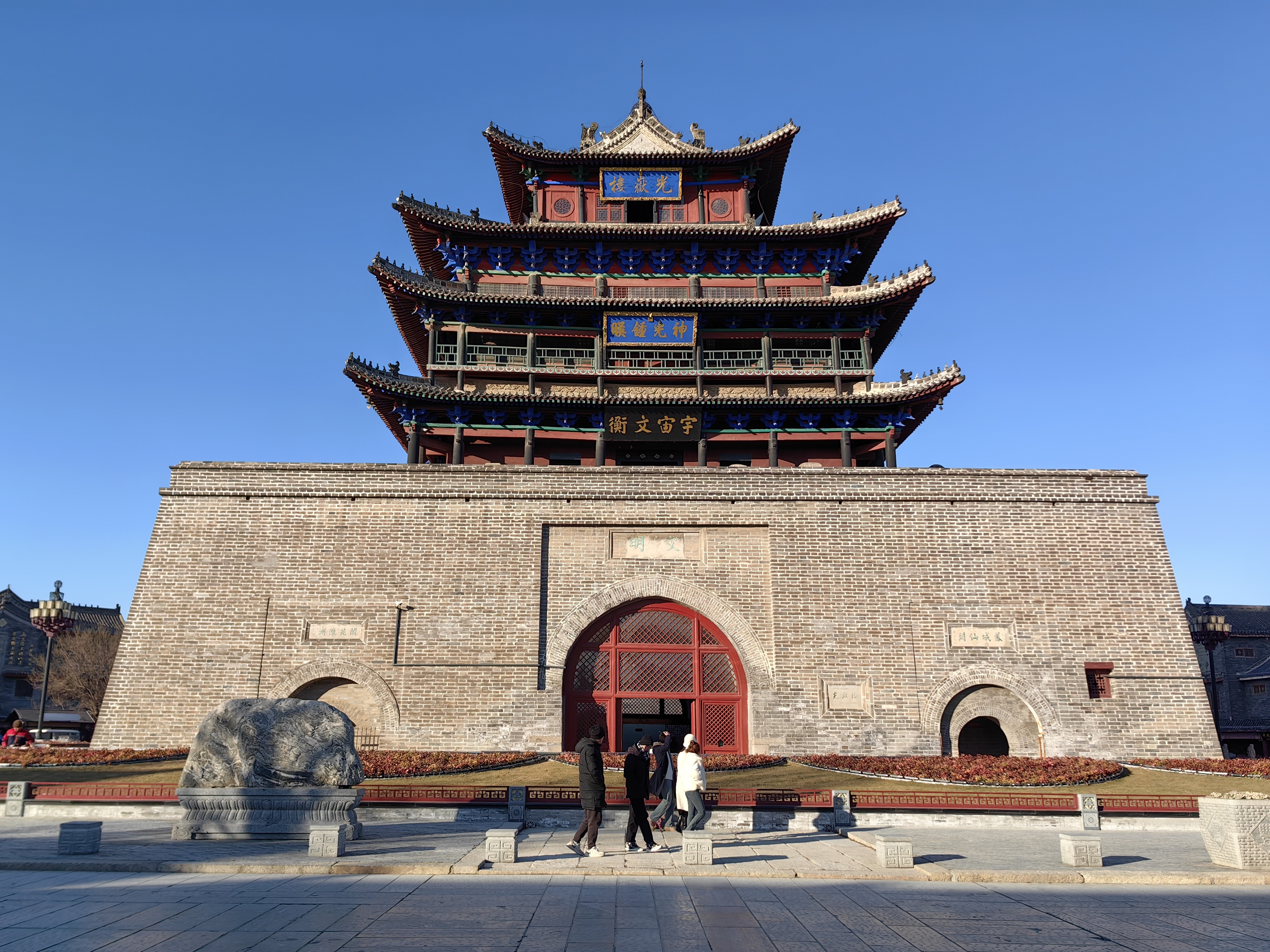
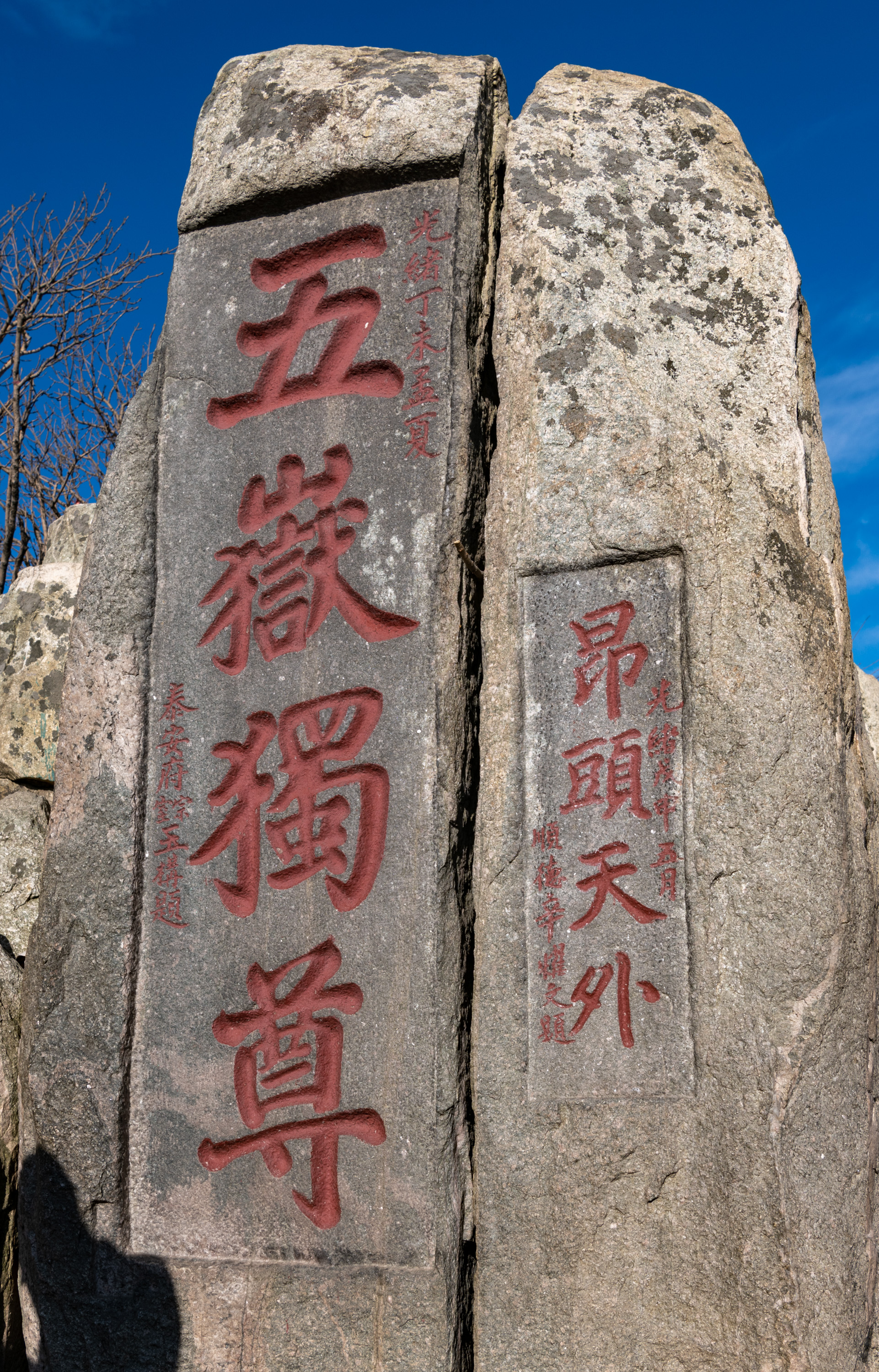
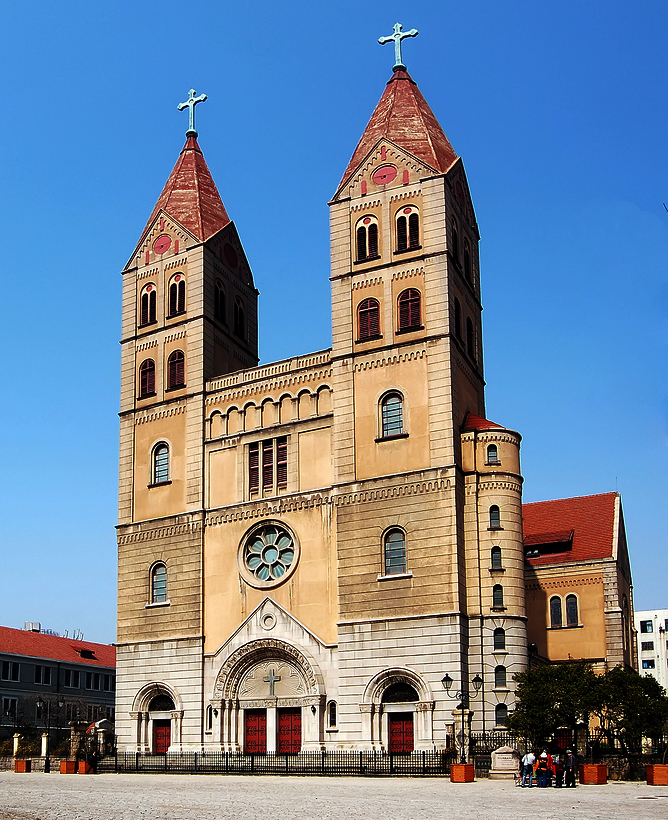
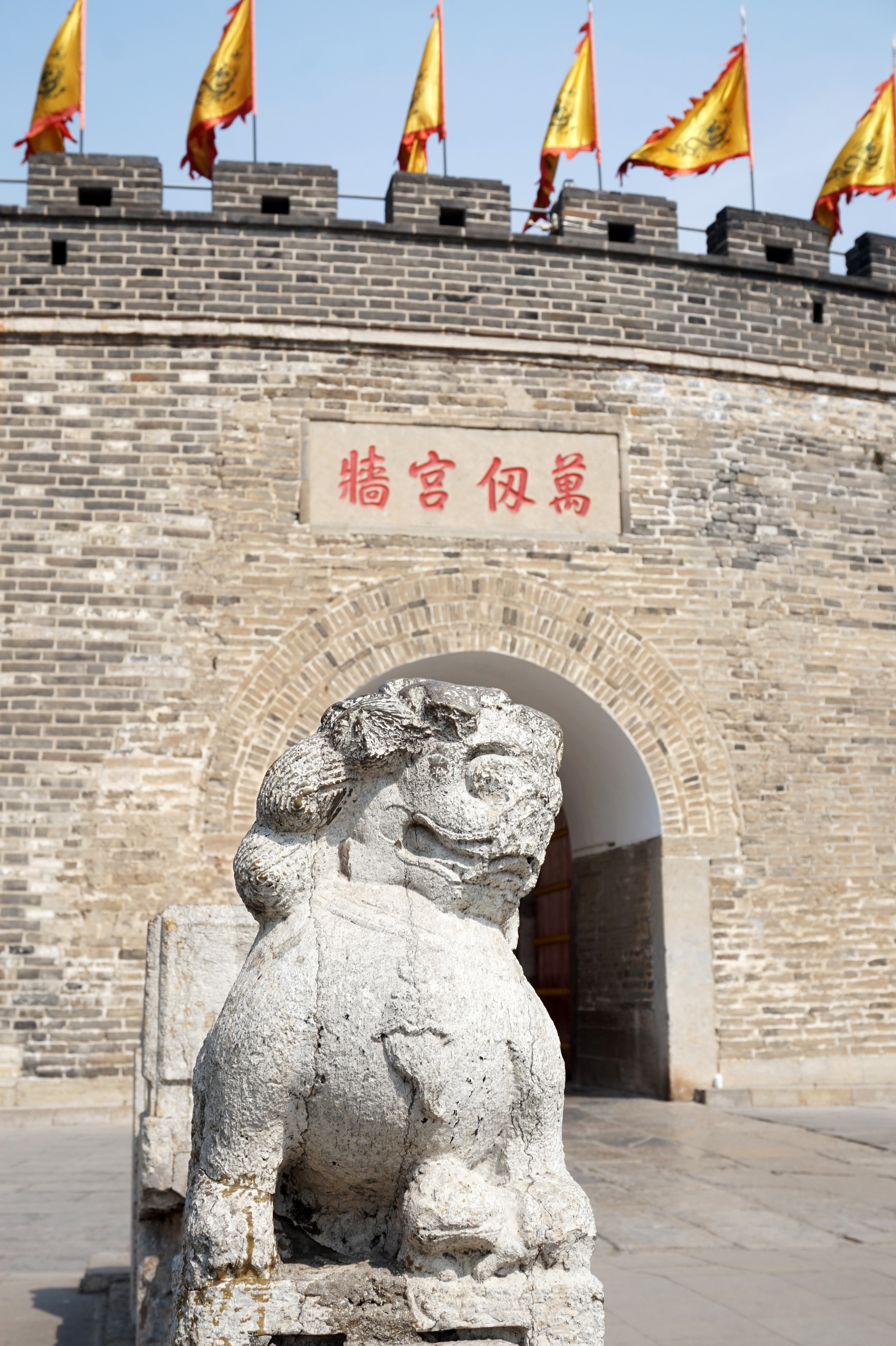
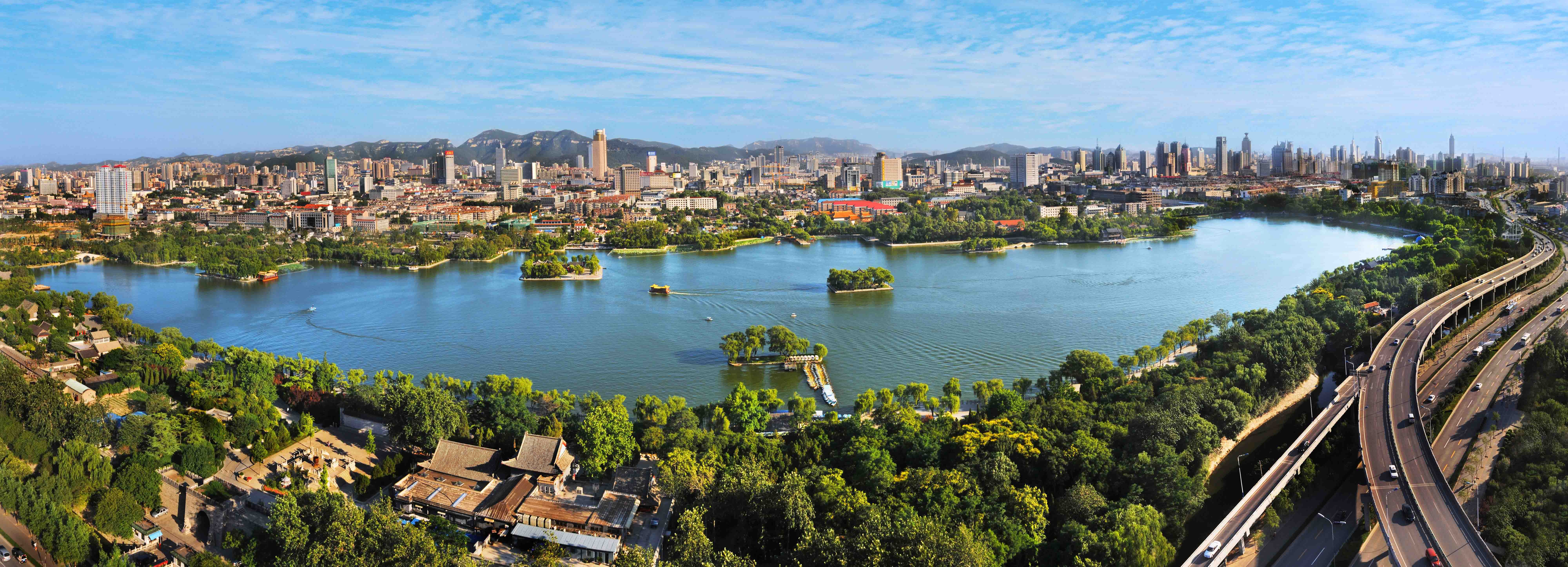
- Penglai Pavilion Yellow River delta Weishan Lake Guangyue Tower Mount Tai St. Michael's Cathedral in Qingdao Qufu Daming Lake

- Location of Shandong within China
- Coordinates: 36°24′N 118°24′E
- Country: China
- Capital: Jinan
- Largest city: Linyi
- Divisions: 16 prefectures, 140 counties, 1941 townships

Government
  - Type: Province
  - Body: Shandong Provincial People's Congress
  - Party Secretary: Lin Wu
  - Congress chairman: Lin Wu
  - Governor: Zhou Naixiang
  - CPPCC chairman: Ge Huijun
  - National People's Congress Representation: 173 deputies

Area
  - Total: 157,100 km^{2} (60,700 sq mi)
  - Rank: 20th
- Highest elevation (Mount Tai): 1,545 m (5,069 ft)

Population (2022)
  - Total: 101,630,000
  - Rank: 2nd
  - Density: 646.9/km^{2} (1,675/sq mi)
  - Rank: 5th
- Demonym: Shandongese

Demographics
  - Ethnic composition: Han – 99.3%; Hui – 0.6%
  - Languages and dialects: Jiaoliao Mandarin, Jilu Mandarin, Zhongyuan Mandarin

GDP (2025)
  - Total: CN¥10.31 trillion (3rd) (US$1.48 trillion)
  - Per capita: CN¥101,446 (11th) (US$14,563)
- ISO 3166 code: CN-SD
- HDI (2023): 0.798 (14th) – high
- Website: sd.gov.cn

Shandong
- Simplified Chinese: 山东
- Traditional Chinese: 山東
- Literal meaning: East of the (Taihang) Mountains
Transcriptions
Standard Mandarin
- Hanyu Pinyin: Shāndōng
- Bopomofo: ㄕㄢ ㄉㄨㄥ
- Gwoyeu Romatzyh: Shandong
- Wade–Giles: Shan^{1}-tung^{1}
- IPA: [ʂán.tʊ́ŋ]
Wu
- Romanization: Se^{平} ton^{平}
Yue: Cantonese
- Yale Romanization: Sāan-dūng
- Jyutping: Saan1-dung1
- IPA: [san˥.tʊŋ˥]
Southern Min
- Hokkien POJ: Soaⁿ-tang
- Tâi-lô: Suann-tang

Shandong (Note: UK: /ʃænˈdʊŋ/ shan-DUUNG, US: /ʃɑːnˈdɔːŋ/ shahn-DAWNG; simplified Chinese: 山东; traditional Chinese: 山東; alternately romanized as Shantung) is a coastal province in East China. It is China's second-most populous province, with 101.5 million people at the 2020 census. Jinan is the capital, while Linyi is the largest city by area and population. Shandong has played a major role in the development of the Chinese civilization and culture as it has served as a pivotal cultural and religious center for Taoism, Chinese Buddhism and Confucianism. Shandong's Mount Tai is the most revered mountain of Taoism and a site with one of the longest histories of continuous religious worship in the world. The Buddhist temples in the mountains south of the provincial capital of Jinan were once among the foremost Buddhist sites in China. The city of Qufu was the birthplace of Confucius, and later became the center of Confucianism.

Shandong's location at the intersection of ancient and modern north–south and east–west trading routes has helped establish it as an economic center. After a period of political instability and economic hardship beginning in the late 19th century, Shandong has experienced rapid growth in recent decades. Shandong is the world's sixth-most populous subnational entity, and China's second-most populous province. The economy of Shandong is China's third-largest provincial economy, with a gross regional product (GRP) of CN¥10.32 trillion in 2025, representing a 5.5% increase from the previous year. If considered among sovereign states, Shandong would rank as the 15th-largest economy and the 15th-most populous as of 2021. Its GDP per capita is slightly above the national average.

Shandong is one of China's leading provinces in education and research. It has 153 higher education institutions, ranking second in East China after Jiangsu and fourth among all Chinese first-level divisions after Jiangsu, Guangdong and Henan. As of 2025, the Nature Index ranked two major cities in Shandong (Jinan #27 and Qingdao #31) in the global top 35 cities by scientific research output.

== Etymology ==
The name Shandong (山东; 山東) literally translates to "east of the mountain," from 'mountain' (山) and 'east' (东; 東). The name first came into being in Jin Dynasty, when Shandong East and West Circuit were created. The name refers to the province's location to the east of the Taihang Mountains. Its counterpart is Shanxi, which literally means 'west of the mountains' and lies to the west of the Taihang Mountains.

A common nickname for Shandong is Qilu (齐鲁; 齊魯), from two major states Qi and Lu that existed in this region during the Spring and Autumn period. Whereas Qi was a major political power, Lu played only a minor political role but became renowned as the home of Confucius, and its cultural influence came to eclipse that of Qi. The cultural legacy of Lu is reflected in the province's official abbreviation of Lǔ (鲁; 魯).

The province's old spelling is Shantung, which can be seen in Shantungosuchus, Shantungosaurus and Shantung fabric.

== History ==
=== Ancient history ===
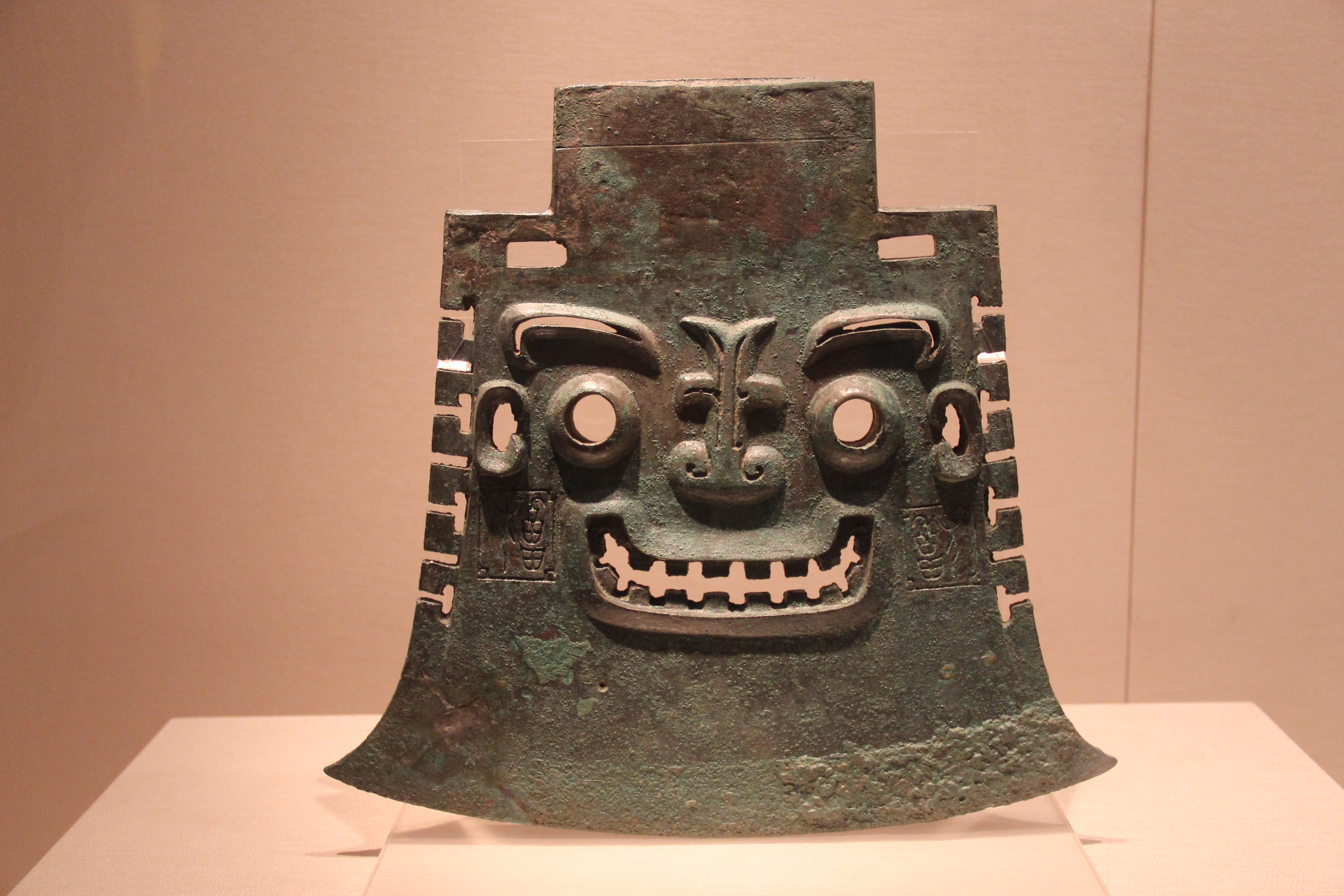
Yachou bronze axe (亞醜鉞) was forged by a tribe of Dongyi people, which probably called Yachou; its exquisite workmanship and valuable inscripts made it China's first-class national artifact and now preserved in China National Museum

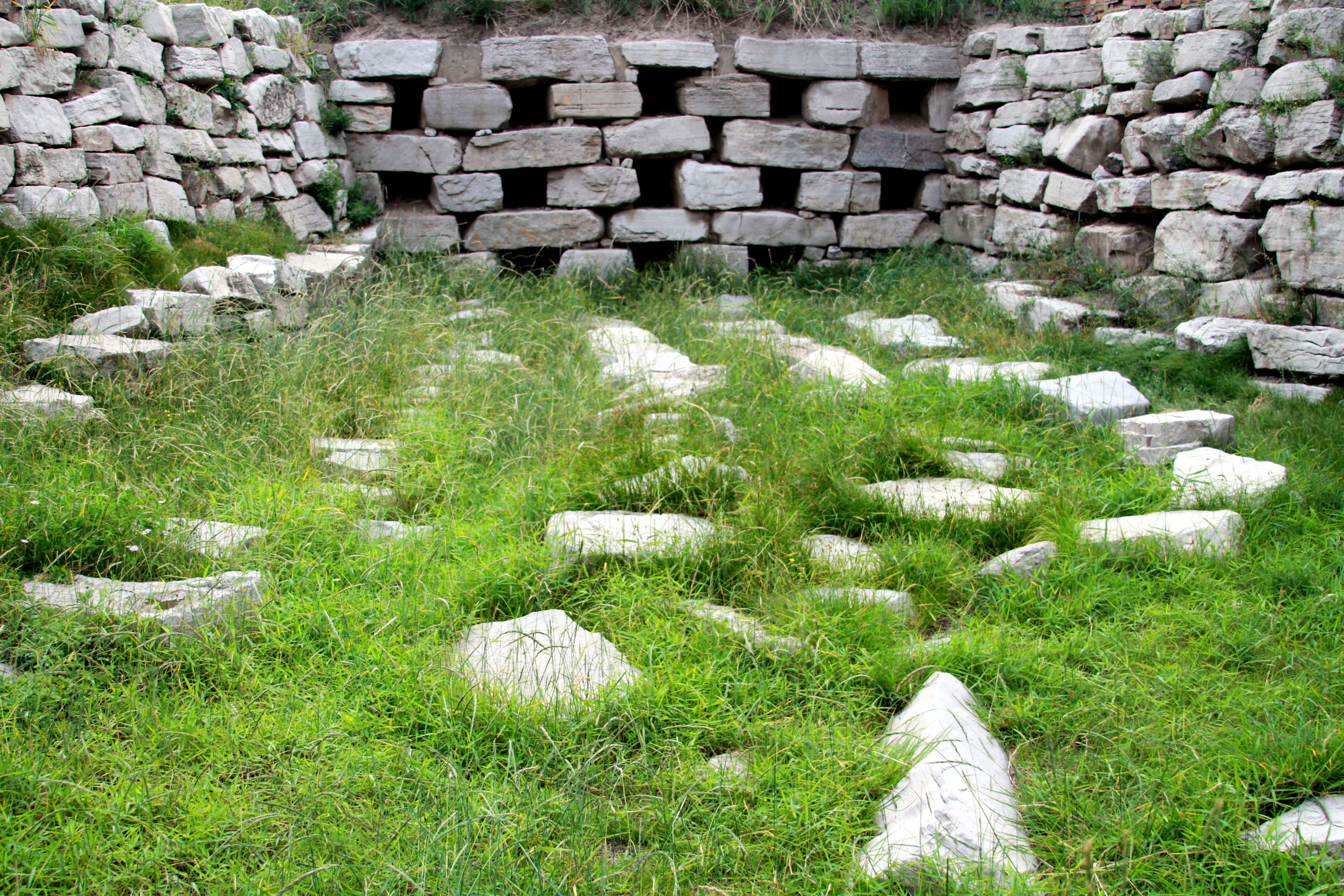
Remains of Ancient Linzi city sewer passing underneath the former city wall

With its location on the eastern edge of the North China Plain, Shandong was home to a succession of Neolithic cultures for millennia, including the Houli (c. 6500–5500 BC), Beixin (c. 5300–4100 BC), Dawenkou (c. 4100–2600 BC), Longshan (c. 3000–2000 BC), and Yueshi cultures (c. 1900–1500 BC).

The Shang and Zhou dynasties exerted varying degrees of control over western Shandong, while eastern Shandong was inhabited by Dongyi peoples, who were considered barbarians by the inhabitants of the Central Plain. Following the annexation the Dongyi state of Lai by the state of Qi in 567 BC, the Dongyi gradually became sinicized.

During the Spring and Autumn and Warring States periods, power was accumulated by regional states; Shandong was home to the state of Qi based in Linzi, and the state of Lu based in Qufu. Lu is famous for being the home of Confucius; however, it was comparatively small, eventually being annexed by the neighboring state of Chu to its south. Meanwhile, Qi was a significant power throughout the entire period, and ruled cities including Jimo, Linzi, and Ju.

=== Imperial history ===
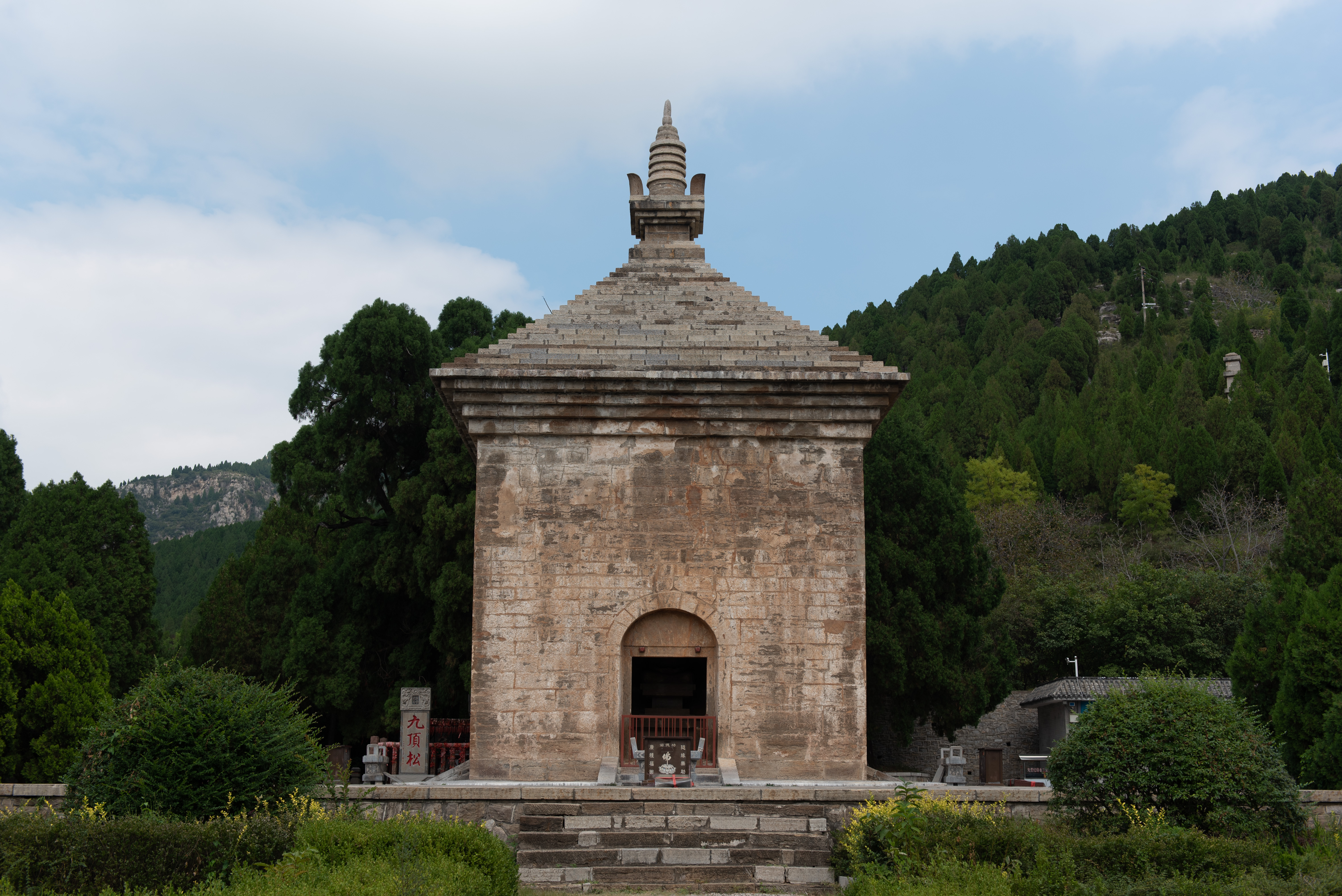
Four Gates Pagoda was the only intact Sui dynasty pagoda in China

The Qin dynasty conquered Qi and founded the first centralized Chinese state in 221 BC. The Han dynasty that followed created several commanderies supervised by two inspectorates (刺史部) in what is now modern Shandong: Qingzhou Inspectorate (青州) in the north and Yanzhou Inspectorate (兗州) in the south. During the Three Kingdoms period, Shandong was part of the northern kingdom of Cao Wei, which ruled over northern China.

After the Three Kingdoms period, a brief period of unity under the Western Jin dynasty gave way to invasions by nomadic barbarians from the north. Northern China, including Shandong, was overrun. Over the next century or so, Shandong changed hands several times, falling to the Later Zhao, then Former Yan, then Former Qin, then Later Yan, then Southern Yan, then the Liu Song dynasty, and finally the Northern Wei dynasty, the first of the Northern dynasties during the Northern and Southern dynasties period. Shandong stayed with the Northern dynasties for the rest of this period.

In 412 AD, the Chinese Buddhist monk Faxian landed at Laoshan, on the southern edge of the Shandong peninsula, and proceeded to Qingzhou to edit and translate the scriptures he had brought back from Pakistan and India.

The Sui dynasty reestablished unity in 589, and the Tang dynasty (618–907) presided over the next golden age of China. For the earlier part of this period, Shandong was ruled as part of Henan Circuit, one of the circuits (a political division). Later on, China splintered into warlord factions, resulting in the Five Dynasties and Ten Kingdoms period. Shandong was part of the Five Dynasties, all based in the north.

The Song dynasty reunified China in the late tenth century. The classic novel Water Margin was based on folk tales of outlaw bands active in Shandong during the Song dynasty. In 1996, the discovery of over two hundred buried Buddhist statues at Qingzhou was hailed as a major archaeological find. The statues included early examples of painted figures and are thought to have been buried due to Emperor Huizong's repression of Buddhism (he favored Taoism).

The Song dynasty was forced to cede northern China to the Jurchen Jin dynasty in 1142. Shandong was administered by Jin as Shandong East Circuit and Shandong West Circuit – the first use of its current name.

=== Early modern era ===
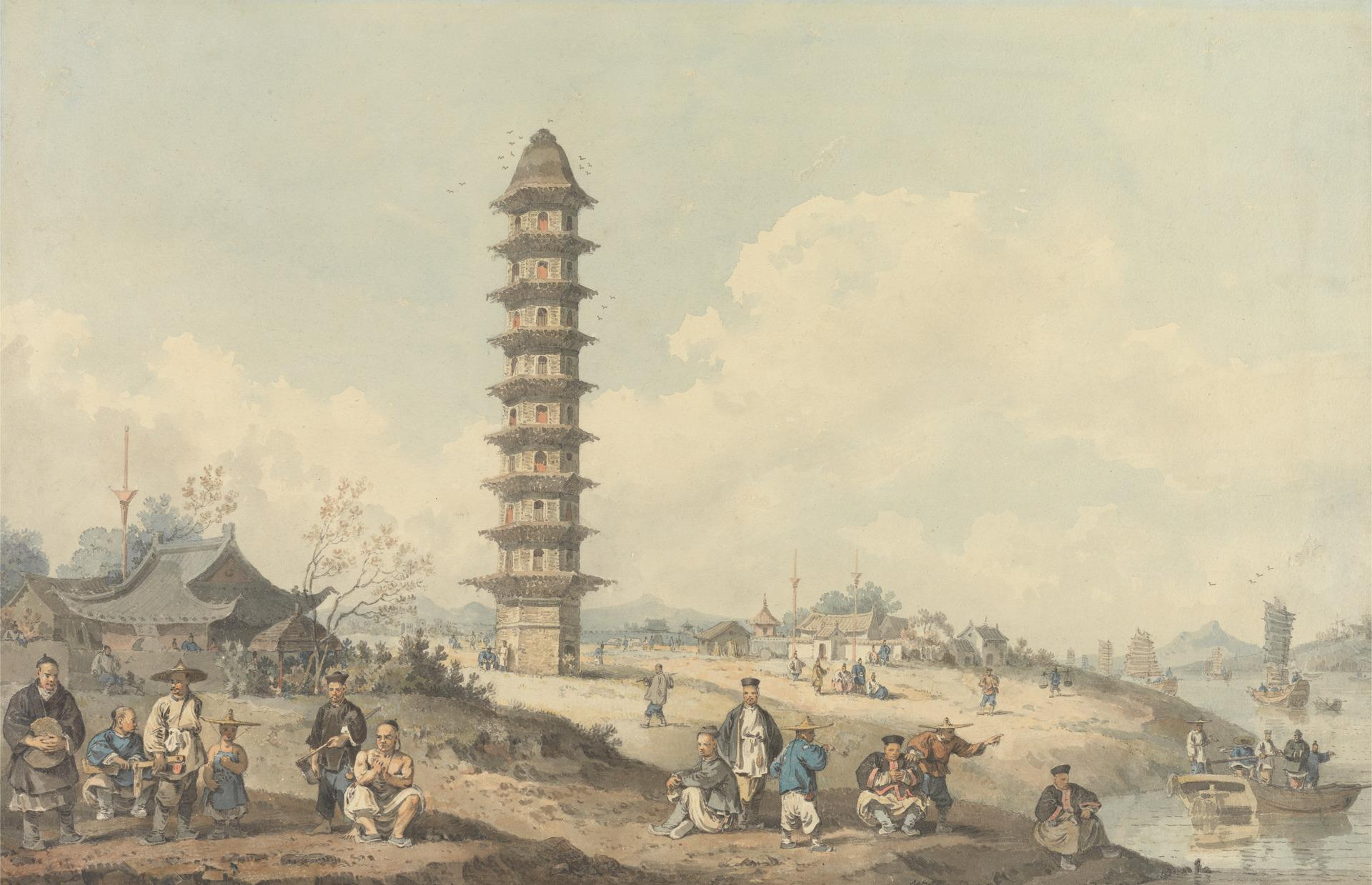
Linqing City, with a view of the Grand Canal. Drawing by William Alexander, draughtsman of the Macartney Embassy to China in 1793.

The modern province of Shandong was created by the Ming dynasty, where it had a more expansive territory, including the eastern of Liaoning (Liaodong). In 1376, the capital of Shandong moved from Qingzhou to Jinan, and since then, Jinan served as the provincial capital for seven centuries.

After Emperor Yongle moved the capital to Beijing in 1421, the cities of Jining and Linqing along the Grand Canal flourished due to the development of canal grain transport. However, due to the Little Ice Age (approximately 1550–1770), crop yields declined and famine persisted year after year, and compounded by the harsh policies of the imperial court, peasant rebellions broke out continuously.

In 1633, Ming generals Kong Youde and Geng Zhongming led their troops from Dengzhou, Shandong to Liaodong to surrender to the Manchu Qing, later joining the Qing army's entry into China proper. By 1640, peasant uprisings led by the White Lotus Society in Shandong intensified. The Ming court dispatched Zhu Datian to suppress the revolt, causing Shandong's population to decline sharply once again.

The earthquake with an estimated magnitude of 8.5 and an epicenter just northeast of Linyi devastated Dengzhou and the prefecture, and killed foreigners and locals, between 43,000 and 50,000 people are claimed to lost their lives.

=== Late Qing era ===
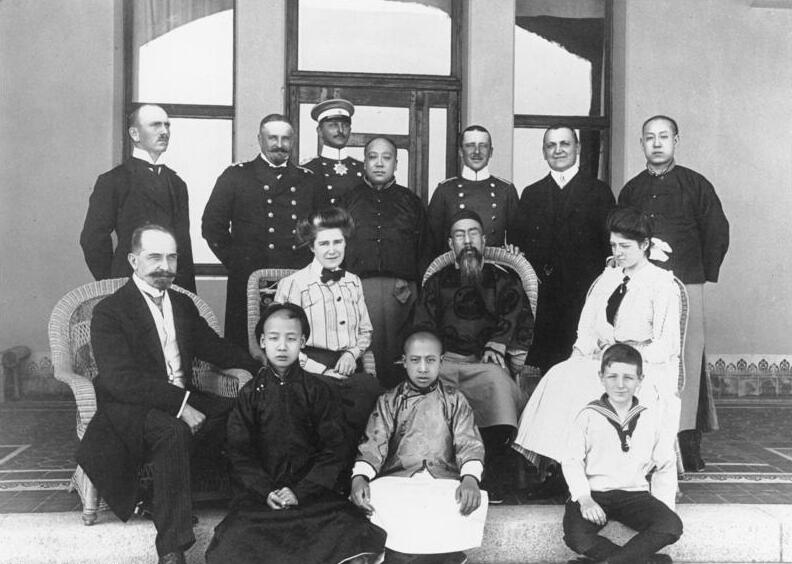
Imperial German vice admiral Alfred Meyer-Waldeck and other colonial officers, together with Sun Baoqi, the Qing Governor of Shandong, in Kiautschou Bay Leased Territory, April 1910

After the defeat in the First Opium War, China became increasingly exposed to Western influence; as a coastal province, Shandong was significantly affected. After the Second Opium War, Qing court opened Cheefoo as trade port, and then western powers like established consulates, missionaries, Christian schools, and factories in there. Due to its strategic position, every power wanted to gain its position in the province; in the 1880s, Shandong became the logistics and training base of Beiyang Fleet, and Weihaiwei served as the headquarter of the fleet. However, Beiyang fleet suffered a disastrous defeat at the hands of the Imperial Japanese Navy in 1894, and Japanese began to penetrate into Shandong. Three years later, two German catholic missionaries were killed in Juye, Heze, causing the Juye Incident, and Qing government had to cede Qingdao to the German Empire. In 1898, Weihaiwei was also given to Britain, as the result of pressure from Russian Empire.

Moreover, due to the annexation of Outer Manchuria by Russia in 1860, the Qing government revoked the prohibition and encouraged settlement of Shandong people to what remained of Manchuria. A large number of people from Shandong migrated to Northeast China, Russian Far East, and Korea in search of better opportunities. Many settled in Northeast China (also known as Manchuria), contributing significantly to the region's demographic and agricultural development, engaging in farming, construction, and mining. Before the extermination and forced deportation by Soviets, there were roughly 200 thousand Chinese labors in Russian Far East, 95% of whom are from Shandong.

Shandong was one of the first places where the Boxer Rebellion broke out, and became one of the centers of the uprising. In 1899, Qing general Yuan Shikai was appointed governor of the province to suppress the uprising. He held the post for three years.

Germany took control of the peninsula in 1898, leasing Jiaozhou Bay and its port of Qingdao under threat of force. Development was a high priority for the Germans: over 200 million marks were invested in world-class harbor facilities including berths, heavy machinery, rail yards, and a floating dry dock. Private enterprises worked across the Shandong Province, opening mines, banks, factories, and rail lines.

As a consequence of the First World War, Japan seized German holdings in Qingdao and Shandong. The 1919 Treaty of Versailles transferred ownership to Japan instead of restoring Chinese sovereignty over the area. Popular dissatisfaction with this outcome, referred to as the Shandong Problem, led to the vehement student protests in the May Fourth Movement. Among the reservations to the Treaty that the United States Senate Committee on Foreign Relations approved was "to give Shantung to China", the treaty with reservations was not approved. Finally, Shandong reverted to Chinese control in 1922 after the United States' mediation during the Washington Naval Conference. Weihai followed in 1930.

=== ROC era ===
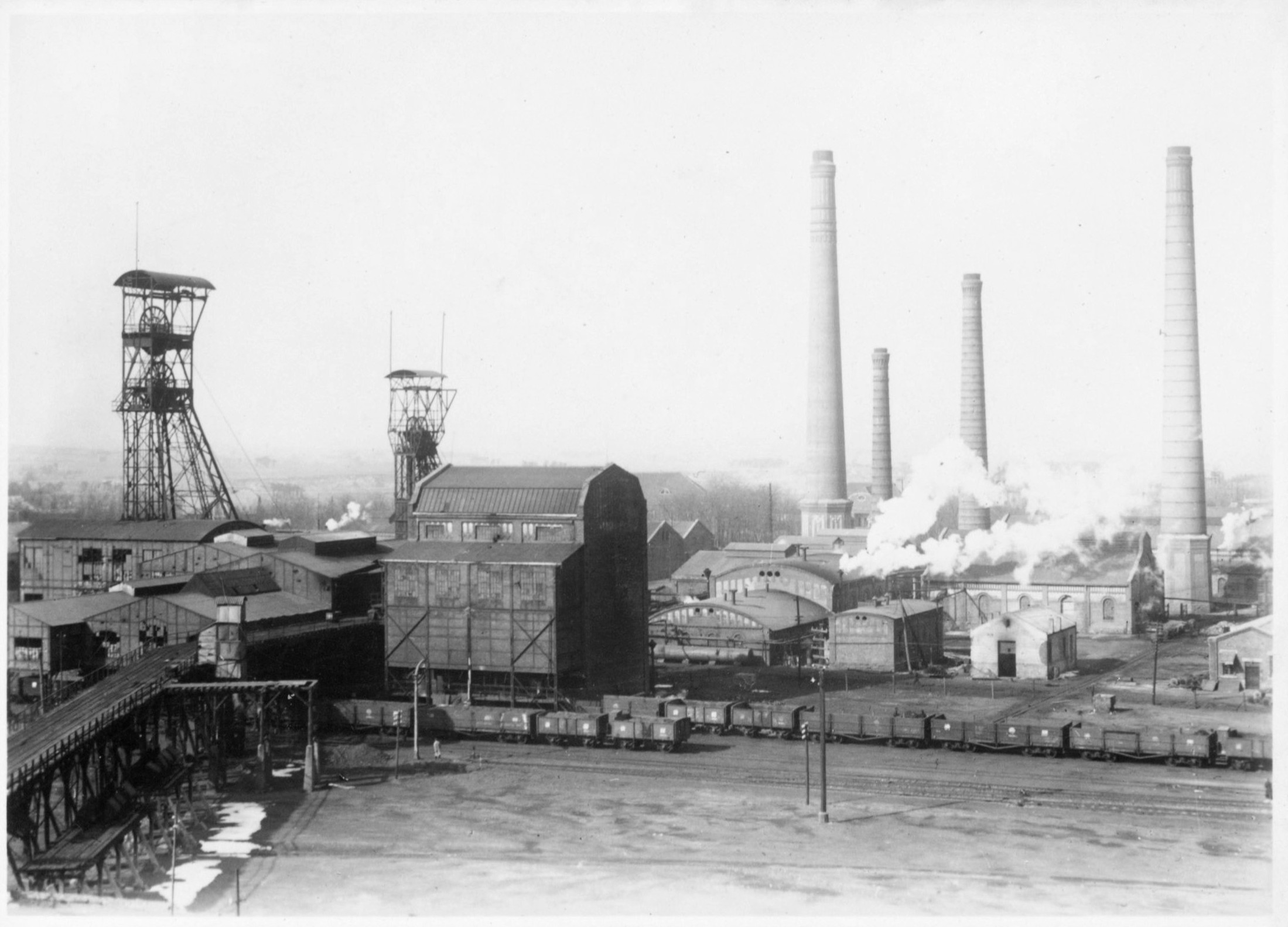
Industrial zone of the Luda Company (魯大公司) in Zichuan in 1929. The central Shandong coal basin, endowed with substantial coal reserves, was first systematically exploited by Germans, which laid the foundation for subsequent development of this region

Shandong's return to Chinese administration came during the Warlord Era of the Republic of China, when the Zhili clique of warlords was given control, but after the Second Zhili–Fengtian War of 1924, the northeast China-based Fengtian clique took over. In April 1925, the Fengtian clique installed the warlord Zhang Zongchang, nicknamed the "Dogmeat General", as military governor of Shandong Province. Time dubbed him China's "basest warlord". He ruled over the province until 1928 when he was ousted in the wake of the Northern Expedition. He was succeeded by Han Fuju, who was loyal to the warlord Feng Yuxiang but later switched his allegiance to the Nanjing government headed by Chiang Kai-shek. Han Fuju also ousted the warlord Liu Zhennian, nicknamed the "King of Shandong East", who ruled eastern Shandong Province, hence unifying the province under his rule.

In 1937 Japan began its invasion of China in the Second World War, which would eventually become part of the Pacific theater. Han Fuju was made Deputy Commander in Chief of the 5th War Area and put in charge of defending the lower Yellow River valley. However, he abandoned his base and about 600,000 ethnic Chinese civilians fled Jinan city with only elderly remaining when Japanese troops crossed the Yellow River. He was executed shortly thereafter for not following orders.

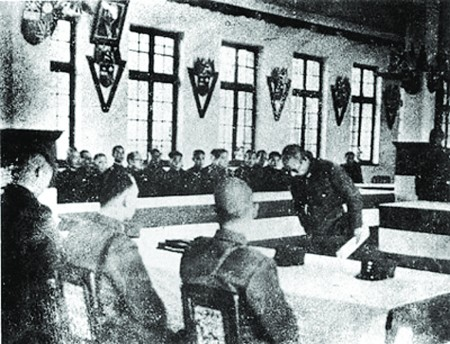
The surrender ceremony of Japanese troops in Shandong Theater on 27 December 1945

During the Japanese occupation, with resistance continuing in the unoccupied areas especially by Muslim peasant villages, by 1945, communist Chinese Red Army forces already held some parts of Shandong. Over the next four years of the Chinese Civil War, they expanded their holdings, eventually driving the Kuomintang (government of the Republic of China) out of Shandong to the island of Taiwan. In May 1947, during the Menglianggu Campaign in the Yimeng Mountains of central Shandong, the Chinese Communist East China Field Army annihilated the Nationalist 74th Corp, widely considered the most elite unit of the National Revolutionary Army. In 1948, Communist forces captured Weixian—then known as the "fortress of central Shandong"—during the Battle of Weixian.

On 2 June 1949, after the withdrawal of the Nationalist Army's 11th Pacification District and U.S. forces from Qingdao, the People's Liberation Army entered the city and incorporated it into Shandong's jurisdiction. On 12 August of the same year, the PLA's Third Field Army secured victory in the Changshan Islands Campaign. With this, the Communist forces had taken full control of Shandong Province.

=== In People's Republic ===
Under the new Communist government, parts of western Shandong were initially given to create the short-lived Pingyuan Province, but this did not last. Shandong also acquired the Prefectures of Xuzhou and Lianyungang, but this did not last either. For the most part, Shandong has kept the same borders that it has today.

Shandong suffrered heavily during the Great Chinese Famine of 1959–62, about six million people starved to death. On 25 August 1966, a confrontation known as the "Qingdao Incident" broke out between cadres and workers on one side and students from three major local universities on the other. This marked the beginning of the Cultural Revolution in Shandong Province.

Mao died in 1976, ending the era of restless political movement in China, two years later, the new leadership launched the Reform and Opening Up. Shandong, especially the eastern coastal region—experienced significant economic development. By 1986, for the first time, the total output value of township and village enterprises across the province surpassed that of agriculture.

In 1996, Shandong became the first province in China to achieve full electrification of all households. In 1999, Zhanhua County, the province's last officially designated impoverished county, was declared poverty-free. In 2004, Shandong overtook Guangdong in both industrial output and profits, becoming China's top province in industrial strength for the first time.

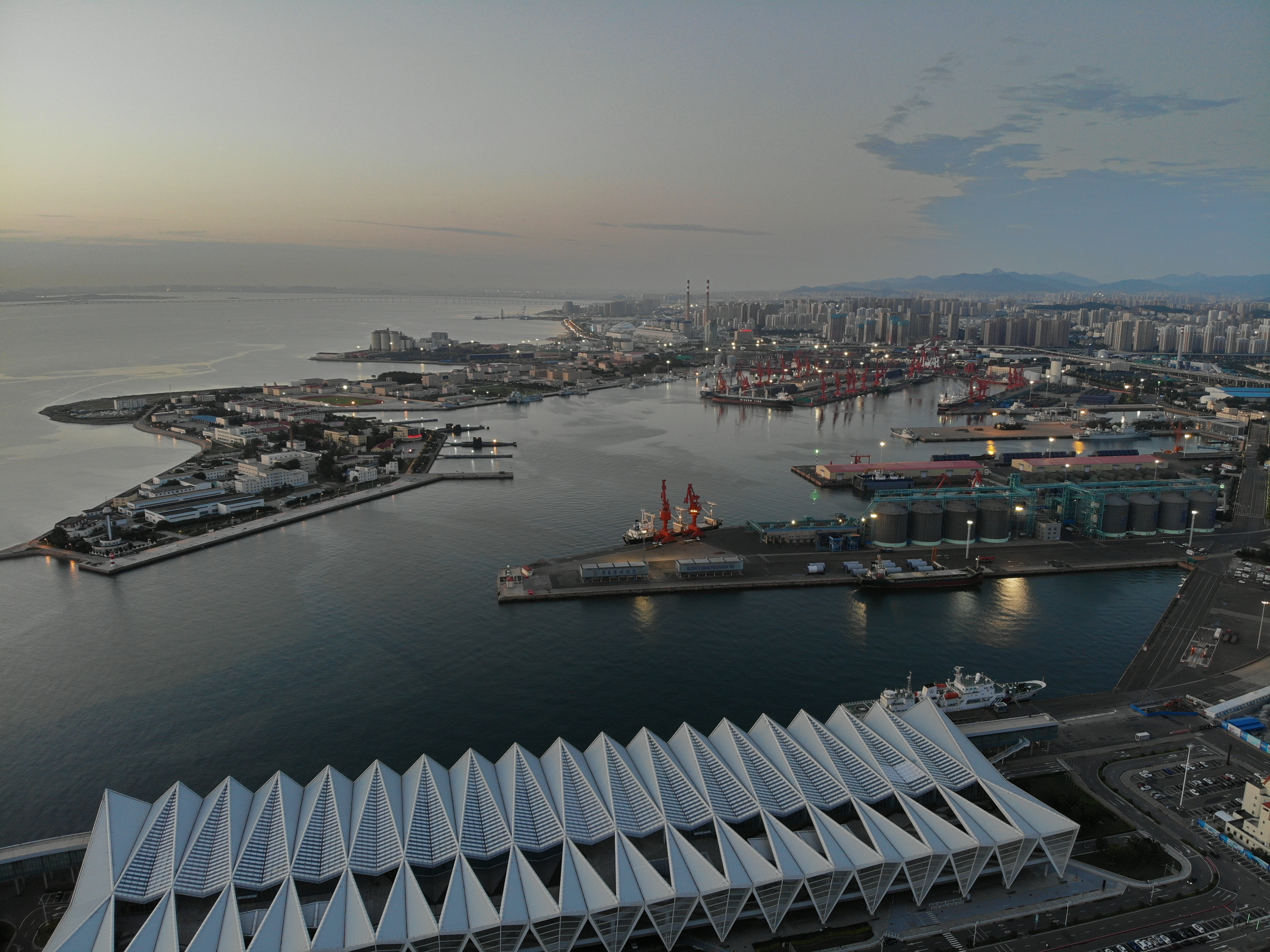
Benefited from its coast, Shandong experienced rapid economic growth after 1978. Ports like Qingdao, Yantai, and Rizhao are constantly ranked top 50 in the world by container traffics

In August and September 2008, Qingdao, as a partner city of Beijing, hosted the sailing competitions of the 29th Summer Olympic Games and the 13th Summer Paralympic Games.

In 2009, Jinan hosted the 11th National Games of the People's Republic of China. On 16 July 2010, German Chancellor Angela Merkel visited China, during which both sides agreed to support the establishment of the Sino-German Ecopark within the Qingdao Economic and Technological Development Zone.

In 2011, the development plan for the Shandong Peninsula Blue Economic Zone was officially approved. On 3 June 2014, the State Council formally approved the establishment of the national-level Qingdao West Coast New Area in Huangdao District.

In August 2019, the State Council approved the establishment of the China (Shandong) Pilot Free Trade Zone, which includes three areas: Jinan, Qingdao, and Yantai. By 2020, the total population of the Shandong Peninsula urban agglomeration was expected to exceed 103 million, with an urban population of 67 million.

== Geography ==
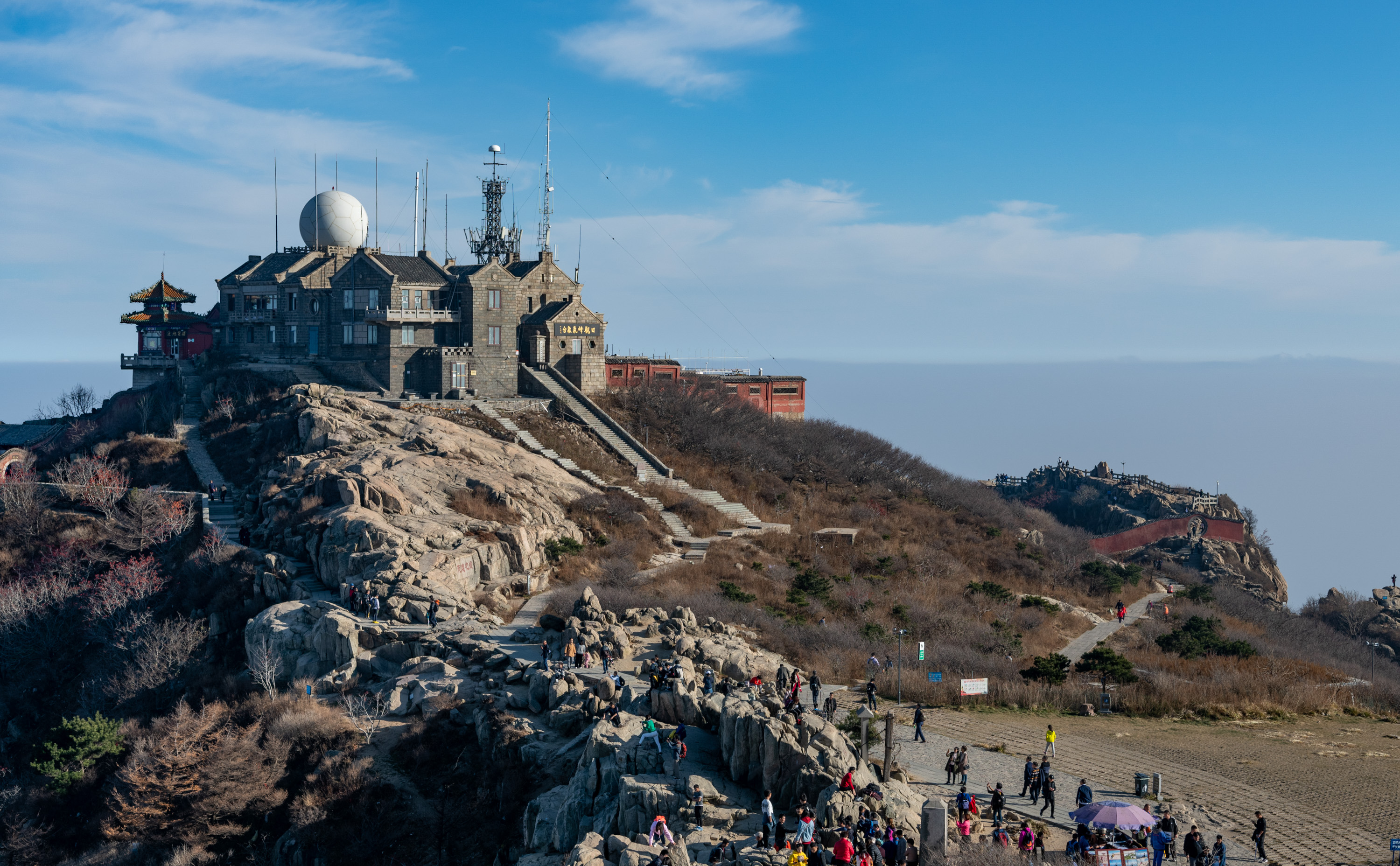
Mount Tai, with the height of 1,545 metres (5,069 ft), is the highest point of Shandong Province

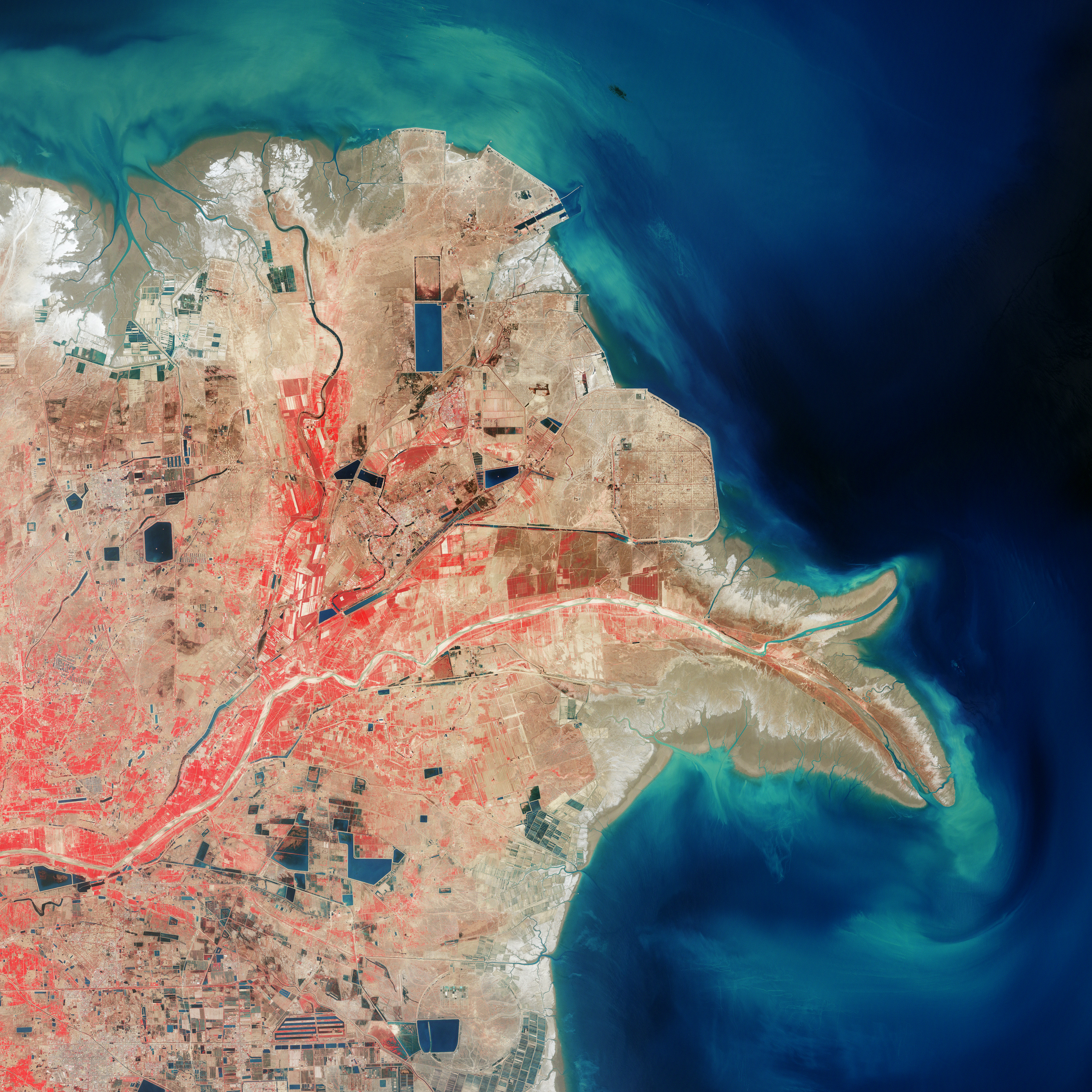
Yellow River Delta, which is located 60 kilometres (37 mi) from downtown Dongying, is one of the largest river delta in the world

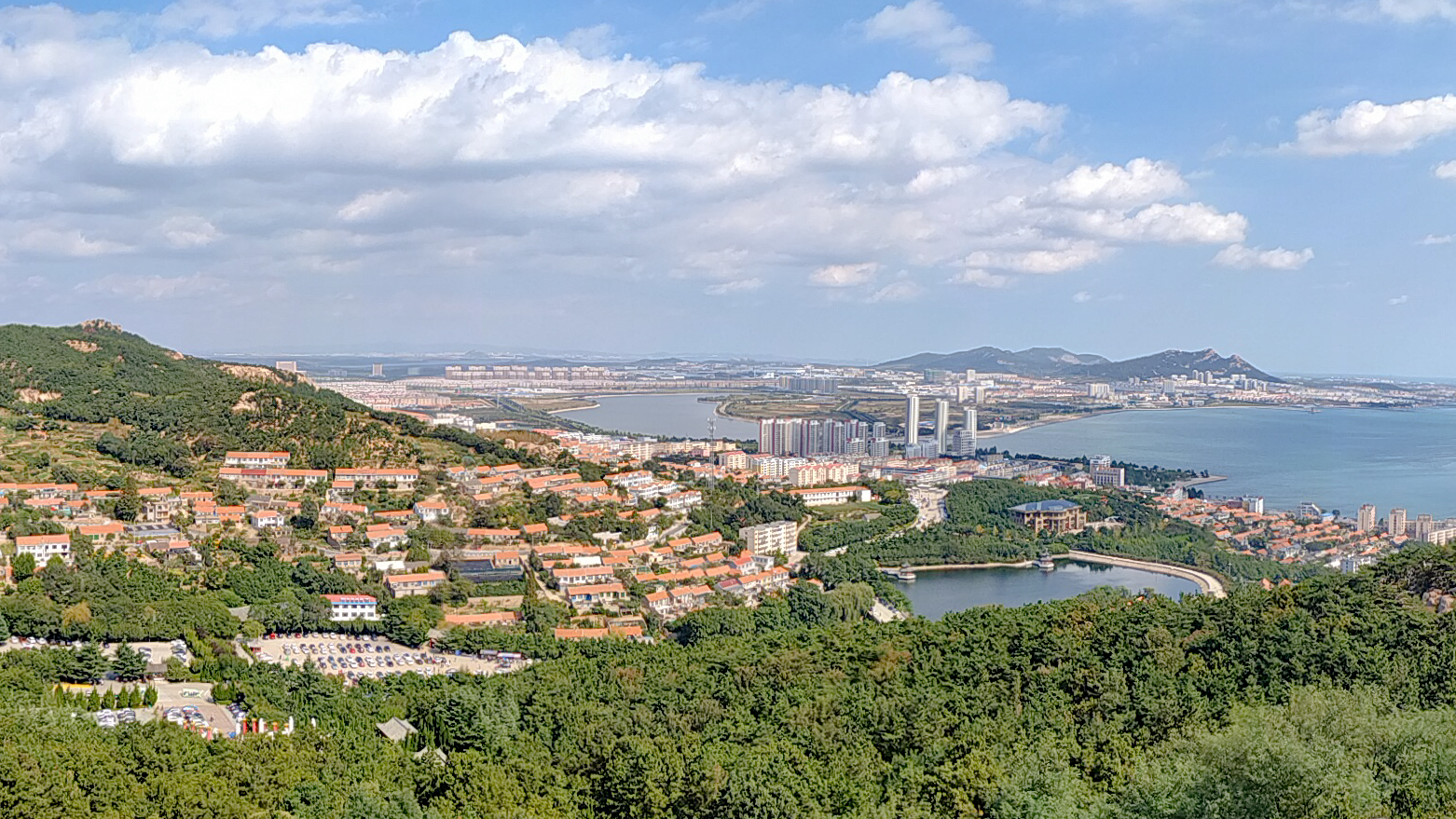
View of Rongcheng, the eastmost city of Shandong, seen from a hill

Shandong is on the eastern edge of the North China Plain and in the lower reaches of the Yellow River, and extends out to sea as the Shandong Peninsula. Shandong borders the Bohai Sea to the north, Hebei to the northwest, Henan to the west, Jiangsu to the south, and the Yellow Sea to the northeast, east and southeast. It shares a short border with Anhui between Henan and Jiangsu.

The northwestern, western, and southwestern parts of the province are all part of the vast North China Plain. The province's center is more mountainous, with Mount Tai being the most prominent. The east of the province is the hilly Shandong Peninsula extending into the sea; Miaodao Archipaelago to the north of Shandong Peninsula is the border of Bohai Sea (west) and Yellow Sea (east). The highest peak of Shandong is Jade Emperor Peak, with a height of 1,545 metres (5,069 ft), which is also the highest peak in the Mount Tai Ranges.

The Yellow River passes through Shandong's western areas, since 1855, it has always been entering the sea to Shandong's northern coast; in Shandong, it flows on a levee, higher than the surrounding land, and dividing western Shandong into the Hai He watershed in the north and the Huai River watershed in the south. The Grand Canal of China enters Shandong from the northwest and leaves on the southwest. Weishan Lake is the largest lake in the province. Shandong's coastline is 3,000 kilometres (1,900 mi) long. Shandong Peninsula has a rocky coastline with cliffs, bays, and islands; Laizhou Bay, the southernmost of the 3 bays of the Bohai Sea, is bordering the northern coast between Dongying and Penglai; Jiaozhou Bay, which is much smaller, is surrounded by Qingdao. The Miaodao Islands extends northwards from the northernmost coast of the peninsula, separating the Bohai Sea and the Yellow Sea.

With Jinan serving as the province's economic and cultural center, the province's economic prowess has led to the development of modern coastal cities located at Qingdao, Weihai, and Yantai.

=== Climate ===
Köppen climate classification map of Shandong, based on its climate from 1991 to 2020

Shandong has a temperate climate: humid continental (Köppen Dwa); it is bordering humid subtropical (Cwa under the Köppen climate classification) in the south. Generally, summers are hot (typical max 35 °C) and rainy (except for eastern parts of Jiaodong Peninsula (typical max 28 °C) and Mount Tai (typical max 20 °C)), while winters are cold and dry. Average temperatures are −9 to 1 °C (16 to 34 °F) in January and 18 to 28 °C (64 to 82 °F) in July. Annual precipitation is 550 to 950 mm (22 to 37 in), the vast majority of which occurs during summer, due to monsoonal influences.

Average temperature in Shandong (°C)
	Spring				Summer				Fall				Winter				
Location	Mar	Apr	May	Seasonal avg.	Jun	Jul	Aug	Seasonal avg.	Sept	Oct	Nov	Seasonal avg.	Dec	Jan	Feb	Seasonal avg.	Annual avg.
Jinan	7.6	15.2	21.8	14.9	26.3	27.4	26.2	26.6	21.7	15.8	7.9	15.1	1.1	−1.4	0.1	0.3	14.2
Qingdao	4.5	10.2	15.7	10.1	20.0	23.9	25.1	23.0	24.1	15.9	8.8	15.4	2.0	−1.2	0.1	0.3	12.2
Zibo	6.1	13.8	20.2	13.4	25.1	26.9	25.5	25.8	20.5	14.2	6.5	13.7	−0.5	−3.0	−0.6	−1.4	12.9
Zaozhuang	7.5	14.1	20.0	13.9	24.9	26.8	26.3	26.0	21.3	15.3	8.0	14.9	1.5	-0.8	1.5	0.7	13.9
Dongying	4.5	12.1	19.1	11.9	23.5	26.0	25.4	25.0	20.2	13.8	5.8	13.3	−1.3	−4.0	−1.9	−2.4	11.9
Yantai	4.3	11.2	17.8	11.1	21.7	24.7	25.0	23.8	21.2	15.6	8.4	15.1	1.6	−1.6	−0.5	−0.2	12.5
Weifang	5.1	12.5	19.1	12.2	23.6	25.9	25.2	24.9	20.2	14.2	6.5	13.6	−0.5	−3.2	−1.0	−1.6	12.3
Jining	7.3	14.2	20.2	13.9	25.4	26.9	26.0	26.1	20.7	14.8	7.1	14.2	0.4	−1.9	0.9	−0.2	13.5
Binzhou	5.4	13.0	19.8	12.7	24.5	26.5	25.5	25.5	20.3	13.9	5.9	13.4	−0.9	−3.8	−1.4	−2.0	12.4
Dezhou	6.0	14.0	20.7	13.6	25.5	26.9	25.5	26.0	20.6	14.1	5.9	13.5	−1.0	−3.4	−0.8	−1.7	12.9
Heze	7.1	14.3	20.4	13.9	25.7	27.0	25.9	26.2	20.8	14.7	7.2	14.2	0.6	−1.7	1.2	0.0	13.6
Liaocheng	6.9	14.1	20.5	13.8	25.6	26.8	25.6	26.0	20.5	14.4	6.6	13.8	−0.1	−2.6	−0.2	−0.8	13.2
Linyi	6.3	13.3	19.3	13.0	23.9	26.2	25.9	25.3	21.0	15.0	7.7	14.6	1.0	−1.5	0.7	0.1	13.2
Tai'an	6.3	13.5	19.4	13.1	24.7	26.3	25.4	25.5	20.3	14.4	6.5	13.7	−0.3	−2.7	0.1	−1.0	12.8
Mount Tai	−1.6	5.6	11.3	5.1	15.6	17.8	17.1	16.8	12.5	6.8	−0.2	6.4	−6.1	−8.6	−6.7	−7.1	5.3

=== Geology ===
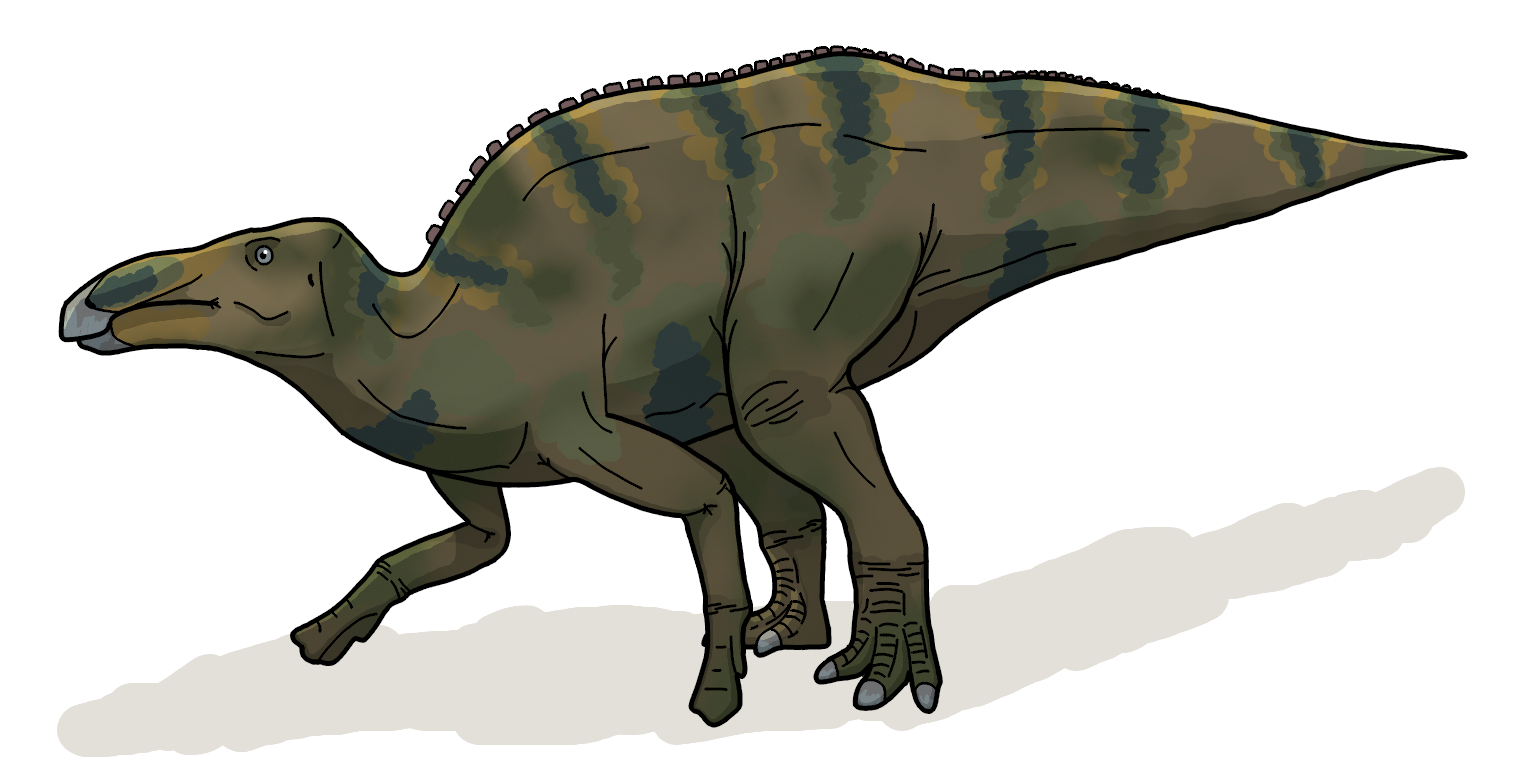
Shantungosaurus was a flat-headed, crestless hadrosaurid dinosaur that lived in East Asia during the Late Cretaceous period. It is the largest known non-sauropod herbivorous dinosaur in the world, with a body size that even exceeded that of large carnivorous dinosaurs such as Tyrannosaurus and Spinosaurus

Shandong is part of the Eastern Block of the North China craton. Beginning in the Mesozoic, Shandong has undergone a crustal thinning that is unusual for a craton and that has reduced the thickness of the crust from 200 km (120 mi) to as little as 80 km (50 mi). Shandong has hence experienced extensive volcanism in the Tertiary.

Some geological formations in Shandong are rich in fossils. For example, Zhucheng in southeastern Shandong has been the site of discovering many dinosaur fossils. In 2008, about 7,600 dinosaur bones from Zhuchengtyrannus, Ankylosaurus, and other genera were found, likely the largest collection ever discovered at one location.

=== Resources ===
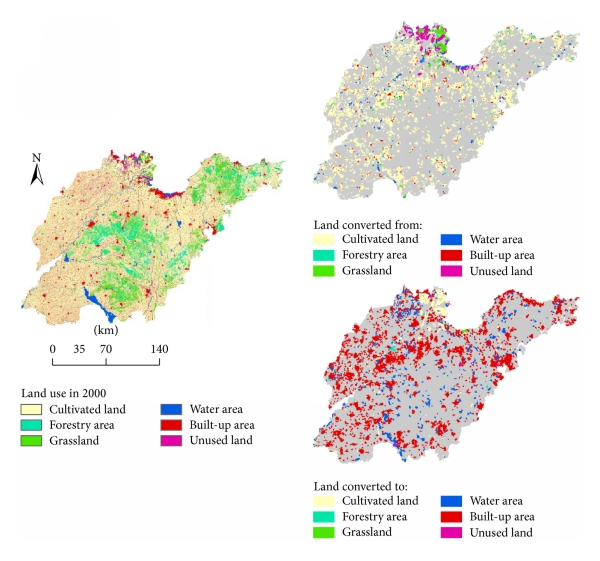
Land use changes in Shandong Province between 2000 and 2008 Arable land Forest Grassland Water bodies Built-up areas Unused land

Shandong is rich in mineral resources, with 128 types of minerals discovered across the province—accounting for 78% of all known mineral types in China. Among the 74 minerals with proven reserves, over 30 rank among the top ten in the country. Of these, gold (rock gold), native sulfur (over 90% of the national reserve), and gypsum (about 70% of national reserves) rank first nationwide. Jiaodong region is the largest gold-producing area in China and the third-largest gold concentration zone in the world. Within the province's maritime exclusive economic zone, 102 types of marine minerals have been discovered, 65 of which have proven reserves.

In 2015, Shandong had a total land area of 237 million mu (approximately 15.8 million hectares), including 173 million mu of agricultural land (with 114 million mu of cultivated land), 42.3 million mu of construction land, and 21.63 million mu of unused land. The province features six major soil types: brown earth, cinnamon soil, fluvo-aquic soil, sandy loam black soil, saline-alkali soil, and paddy soil. Among these, fluvo-aquic, brown, and cinnamon soils occupy the largest areas, accounting for 48%, 24%, and 19% of the cultivated land, respectively.

According to the results of the ninth continuous national forest resource survey, Shandong had a forest coverage rate of 17.51%. Vegetation in the province belongs to 80 families, 203 genera, and includes 615 species. The natural vegetation is mainly warm-temperate deciduous broadleaf forest, with the predominant genus being Quercus (oak), such as Quercus variabilis, Quercus dentata, and Quercus aliena, with the first being the most common. Representative conifer species include the Japanese red pine.

Shandong is home to more than 400 species of terrestrial vertebrates, including nearly 50 mammal species, 356 bird species, 17 reptile species, and 2 amphibian species. Additionally, there are over 600 species of marine economic organisms, including 260 species of fish and 90 species of shellfish.

== Politics ==
=== Party head and provincial government ===
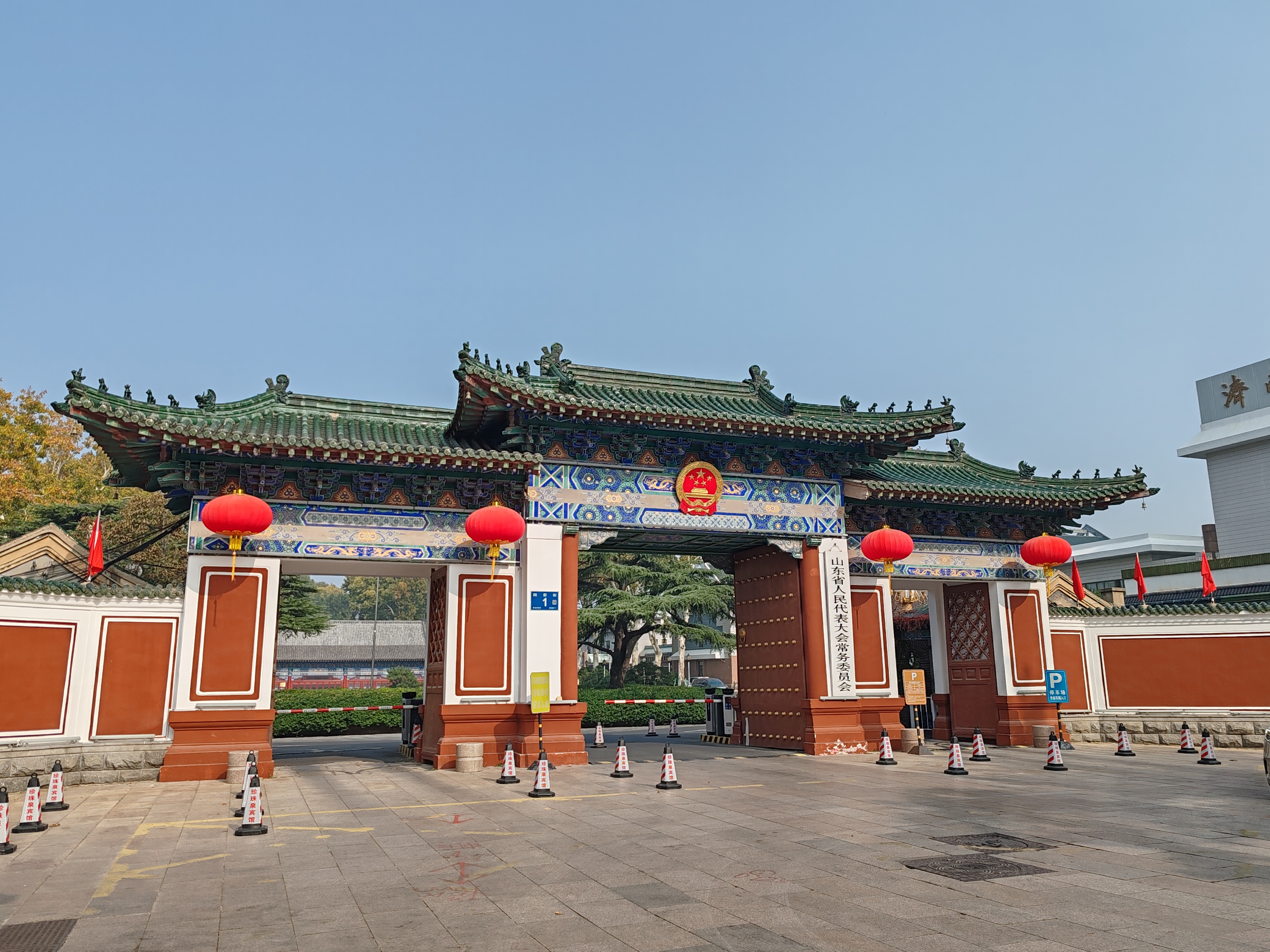
Entrance of Shandong Provincial People's Congress in Jinan; the People's Congress in China is equivalent to state council in Western countries. This site was also used as Masion of Governor of Shandong during Qing Dynasty

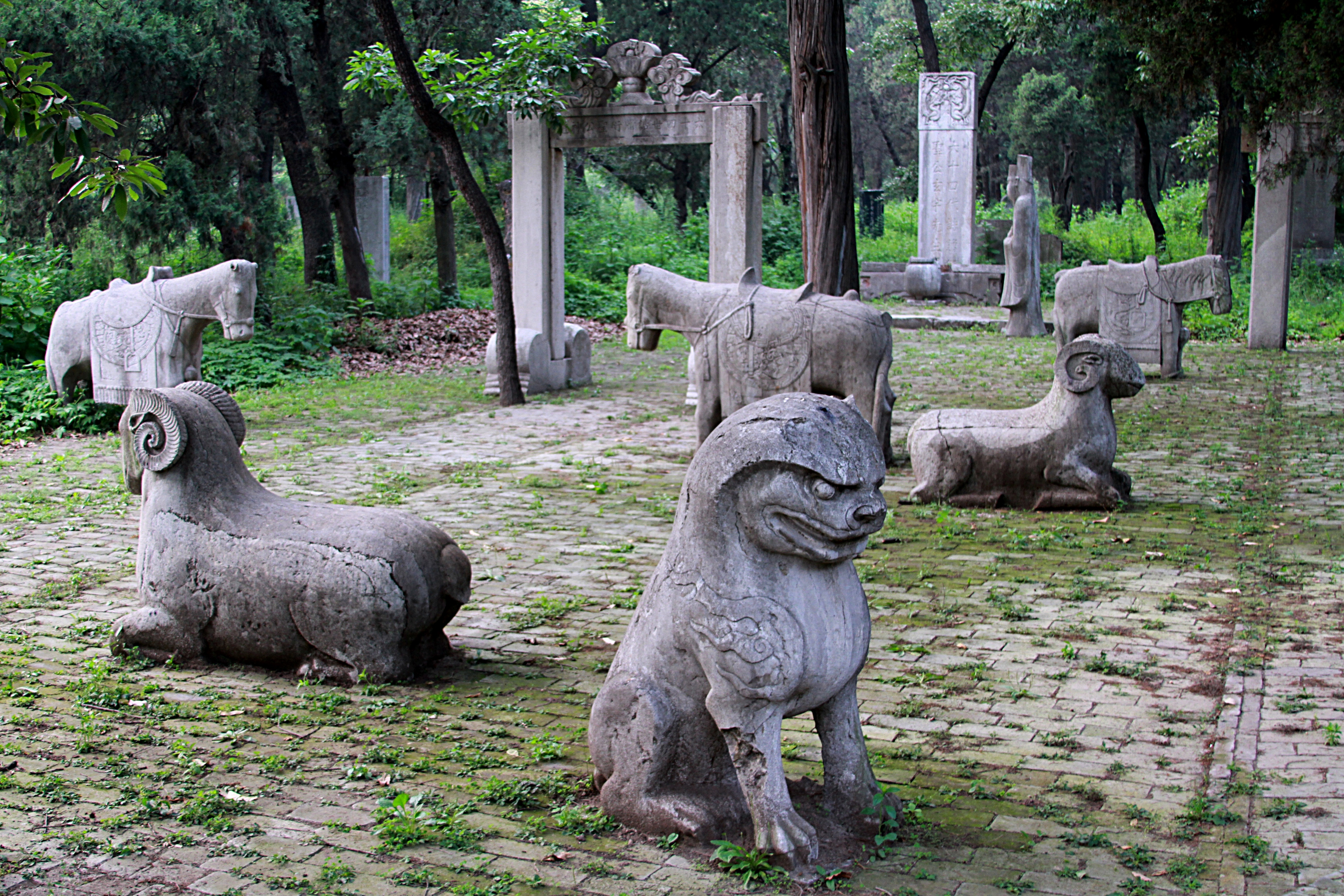
Tomb of the 64th generation senior descendant of Confucius, Kong Shangxian. Many generations of the senior-branch direct descendants of Confucius ruled the Qufu area as its feudal rulers

The Shandong Provincial Committee of the Chinese Communist Party is the leading organ of the Chinese Communist Party (CCP) in Shandong Province. It is elected by the Shandong Provincial Congress of the CCP and, during the intersessional period of the congress, executes the directives of the Central Committee of the CCP and the resolutions of the provincial congress, leads the work of Shandong Province, and regularly reports its work to the Central Committee of the CCP. Lin Wu is the current Secretary of the Shandong Provincial Party Committee.

The Shandong Provincial People's Congress is the organ of state power in Shandong Province. It was established on 17 August 1954. It currently consists of provincial deputies elected from the 16 prefecture-level cities of Shandong and the People's Liberation Army units stationed in the province. Lin Wu currently also serves as the Chairman of the Standing Committee of the Shandong Provincial People's Congress.

The Shandong Provincial People's Government is the State Administration in Shandong province. Its main officials are elected and appointed by The Shandong Provincial People's Congress. The provincial government reports to Shandong Provincial People's Congress and State Council of the People's Republic of China. The current Governor of Shandong is Zhou Naixiang.

=== Judicial system ===
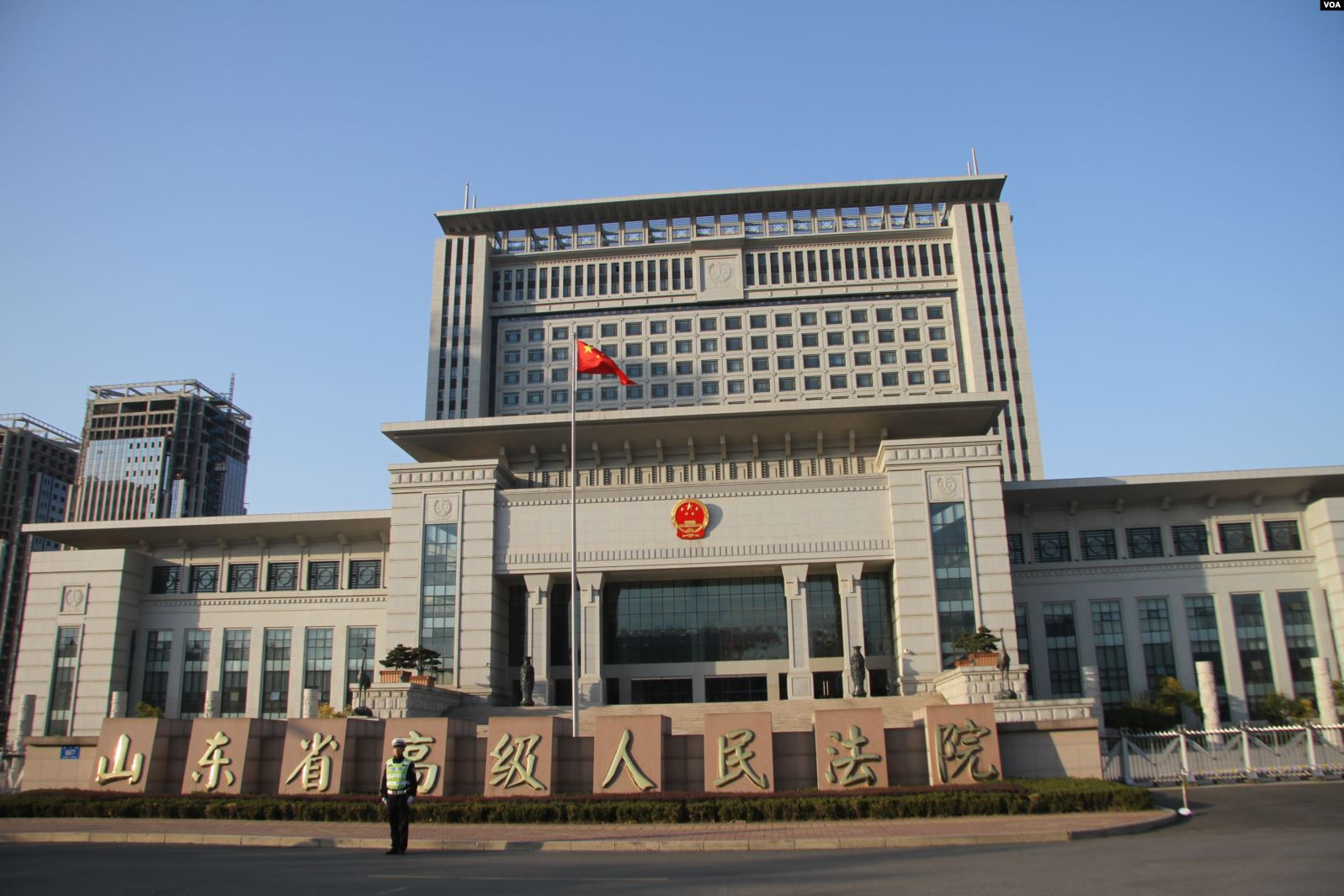
Shandong Provincial Supreme Court

In ancient times, Shandong implemented a judicial system in which administrative and judicial powers were combined—local administrative chiefs also served as judicial officials. It was not until the late Qing dynasty that a modern judicial system began to take shape. In August 1910, the province established the Office of the Judicial Commissioner (提法使司). In January 1911, the Shandong Provincial High Court and the High Prosecutor's Office were established, along with local courts and prosecutor's offices in the provincial capital, Jinan commercial port, and Yantai commercial port. In December of the same year, the Shandong Model Prison was founded in Jinan.

After the founding of the Republic of China, civil and criminal judicial institutions in Shandong were divided into primary, local, and high-level courts. After the establishment of the People's Republic of China, all levels of Shandong's judicial organs underwent judicial reform, and participated in movements such as the Three-Anti and Five-Anti Campaigns.

Today, the Shandong High People's Court serves as the highest court in the province, under the supervision of the Supreme People's Court of the People's Republic of China. The current President of the Court is Huo Min. As of February 2018, there are 18 intermediate courts in Shandong, including 16 municipal intermediate people's courts, as well as two specialized courts: the Jinan Railway Transport Intermediate Court and the Qingdao Maritime Court. The province also has 156 basic-level courts and 633 grassroots tribunals.

The Shandong People's Procuratorate serves as the legal supervisory authority, comprising 16 municipal-level procuratorates, 1 railway transport procuratorate, and 161 grassroots procuratorates.

=== Military ===
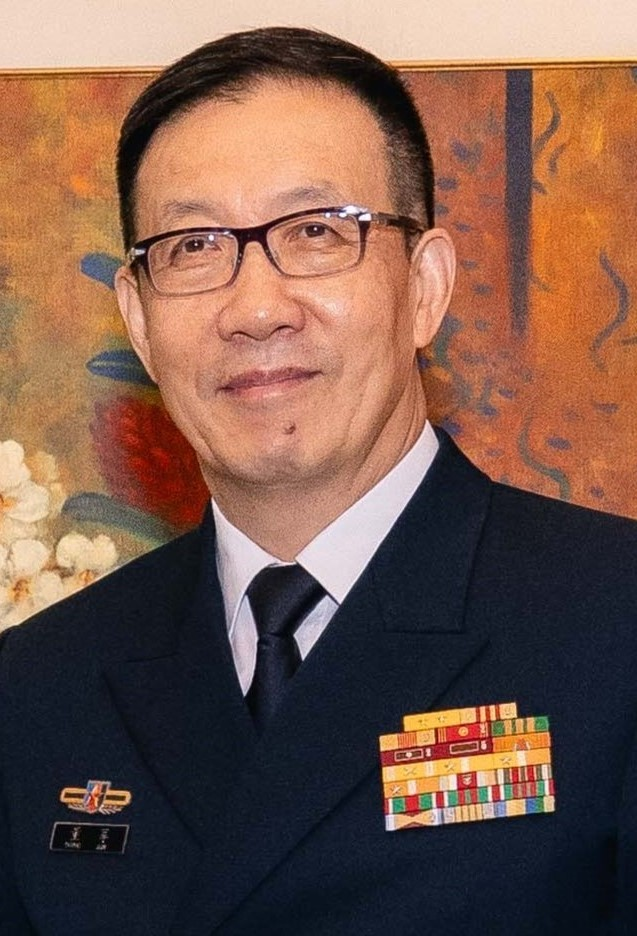
Dong Jun, a native from Yantai, and former chief of staff of North Sea Fleet, now served as China's 14th Minister of National Defense

In February 1949, the Shandong Military Region was established. In 1955, it was reorganized into the Jinan Military Region, which was responsible for the operational command of the land, sea, and air forces within the two provincial-level administrative regions of Shandong and Henan, as well as military, political, and logistical affairs of its subordinate units. It also oversaw the militia, conscription, mobilization, and battlefield construction within its jurisdiction. It served as the strategic general reserve force of the entire PLA. The military region headquarters was located in Shizhong, Jinan.

In October 1961, based on the Mobilization Department of the Jinan Military Region, the Shandong Provincial Military District was established. The militia system was widely implemented across the province. By 1985, Shandong had approximately 1.6 million first-class reserve troops and about 6.4 million second-class reserve troops.

Since 2012, Shandong's border defense has advanced the construction of an integrated land-sea control system, achieving notable results. Currently, the commander of the provincial military district is Qiu Yuechao, and the political commissar is Wang Aiguo.

After the establishment of the Theater Commands on 1 February 2016, Shandong came under the jurisdiction of the PLA Northern Theater Command. The headquarters of the Northern Theater Army, the Shandong Provincial Military District, and the Shandong Armed Police Corps are stationed in Jinan. Qingdao hosts the headquarters of the PLA Northern Theater Navy. The PLA Navy's first destroyer unit was founded in Qingdao in 1954. The base for China's first aircraft carrier, the Liaoning, and its nuclear submarine base are also located in Qingdao.

Other cities are also of military importance. The headquarter of the PLA 80th Group Army is located in Weifang. The PLA Rocket Force's 822nd Missile Brigade is stationed in Laiwu, equipped with DF-21C medium-range ballistic missiles, and the Rocket Force NCO School of People's Liberation Army Rocket Force was established in Qingzhou, Weifang in 2017. On 17 December 2019, the aircraft carrier Shandong was officially commissioned.

== Economy ==
As of 1832, Shandong was exporting fruits, vegetables, wine, drugs, and deerskin, often heading to Guangzhou to exchange clothing and fabrics. The economy of Shandong is China's third largest provincial economy with a GDP of CNY¥8.3 trillion in 2021 or USD1.3 trillion in (nominal), which is equivalent to the GDP of Mexico. Its GDP per capita is around the national average. Compared to a country, it would be the 15th-largest economy and the 15th most populous as of 2021.

Shandong ranks first among the provinces in the production of a variety of products, including cotton, wheat, and garlic as well as precious metals such as gold and diamonds. It also has one of the biggest sapphire deposits in the world. Other important crops include sorghum and maize. Shandong has extensive petroleum deposits as well, especially the Shengli Oil Field (lit. Victory Oilfield) in the Dongying area in the Yellow River delta. Shandong also produces bromine from underground wells and salt from seawater. It is the largest agricultural exporter in China.

Shandong is one of China's richest provinces, and its economic development focuses on large enterprises with well-known brand names. Shandong is the biggest industrial producer and one of the top manufacturing provinces in China. Shandong has also benefited from South Korean and Japanese investment and tourism, due to its geographical proximity to those countries. The richest part of the province is the Shandong Peninsula, where the city of Qingdao is home to three of the most well-known brand names of China: Tsingtao Beer, Haier and Hisense. Besides, Dongying's oil fields and petroleum industries form an important component of Shandong's economy. Despite the primacy of Shandong's energy sector, the province has also been plagued with problems of inefficiency and ranks as the largest consumer of fossil fuels in all of China.

Historical GDP of Shandong Province, 1952–present (SNA2008) (purchasing power parity of Chinese Yuan, as Int'l.dollar based on IMF WEO October 2017 (Note: Purchasing power parity of Chinese Yuan, as Int'l.dollar based on IMF WEO October 2017. Purchasing power parity (PPP) for Chinese yuan is estimate according to IMF WEO data; Exchange rate of CN¥ to US$ is according to State Administration of Foreign Exchange, published in the China Statistical Yearbook.)
year	GDP				GDP per capita (GDPpc) based on mid-year population			Reference index	
year	GDP in millions			real growth (%)	GDPpc			exchange rate 1 foreign currency to CNY	
year	CNY	USD	PPP (Int'l$.)	real growth (%)	CNY	USD	PPP (Int'l$.)	USD 1	Int'l$. 1 (PPP)
2025 (Note: Figures for 2017 onward are on China's unified regional GDP accounting basis following the fourth (2018) and fifth (2023) national economic censuses, and sit on a substantially lower basis than the pre-census SNA2008 series used for 2016 and earlier. The fourth census revised Shandong's 2018 GDP down from CN¥7,646,967 million to CN¥6,664,887 million (−12.8%); the fifth census revised 2023 up to CN¥9,420,600 million. On the census-consistent basis, 2016 GDP was about CN¥5,876,250 million. The 2017–2025 rows are therefore not directly comparable with 2016 and earlier. Individual years reflect the latest published revision (2023 census-revised; 2024 preliminary, later finalised at CN¥9,840,700 million / 5.6%; 2025 preliminary).)	10,319,750	1,444,756		5.5	102,566	14,359		7.1429	
2024	9,856,580	1,384,021		5.7	97,575	13,701		7.1217	
2023	9,420,600	1,336,881		6.0	92,879	13,180		7.0467	
2022	8,757,690	1,302,046		3.9	86,144	12,807		6.7261	
2021	8,287,520	1,284,588		8.3	81,509	12,634		6.4515	
2020	7,279,820	1,055,413		3.6	71,951	10,431		6.8976	
2019	7,054,050	1,022,548		5.3	70,129	10,166		6.8985	
2018	6,664,890	1,007,177		6.3	66,473	10,045		6.6174	
2017	6,301,210	933,264		7.4	63,162	9,355		6.7518	
2016	6,802,449	1,024,110	1,943,057	7.6	68,733	10,348	19,633	6.6423	3.5009
2015	6,393,074	1,026,439	1,801,120	8.0	65,114	10,454	18,345	6.2284	3.5495
2014	6,030,036	981,643	1,698,410	8.7	61,774	10,056	17,399	6.1428	3.5504
2013	5,602,372	904,601	1,566,265	9.6	57,702	9,317	16,132	6.1932	3.5769
2012	5,071,045	803,334	1,428,142	9.9	52,490	8,315	14,783	6.3125	3.5508
2011	4,543,951	703,529	1,296,235	10.9	47,416	7,341	13,526	6.4588	3.5055
2010	3,962,074	585,283	1,196,784	12.3	41,579	6,142	12,559	6.7695	3.3106
2009	3,425,154	501,413	1,084,768	12.2	36,270	5,310	11,487	6.8310	3.1575
2008	3,123,138	449,689	983,108	12.1	33,253	4,788	10,467	6.9451	3.1768
2007	2,599,074	341,804	862,076	14.3	27,833	3,660	9,232	7.6040	3.0149
2006	2,205,967	276,721	766,573	14.7	23,775	2,982	8,262	7.9718	2.8777
2005	1,849,700	225,802	646,974	15.1	20,075	2,451	7,022	8.1917	2.8590
2000	833,747	100,714	306,604	10.3	9,326	1,127	3,430	8.2784	2.7193
1990	151,119	31,594	88,758	5.3	1,815	379	1,066	4.7832	1.7026
1980	29,213	19,496	19,534	12.2	402	268	269	1.4984	1.4955
1978	22,545	14,498		10.1	316	203		1.5550	
1970	12,631	5,131		15.7	199	81		2.4618	
1965	8,625	3,504		22.0	152	62		2.4618	
1957	6,139	2,358		−3.5	116	45		2.6040	
1952	4,381	1,971			91	41		2.2227	

Nominal GDP of Shandong by year (billion CNY)

=== Agriculture ===
Shandong Agricultural Product

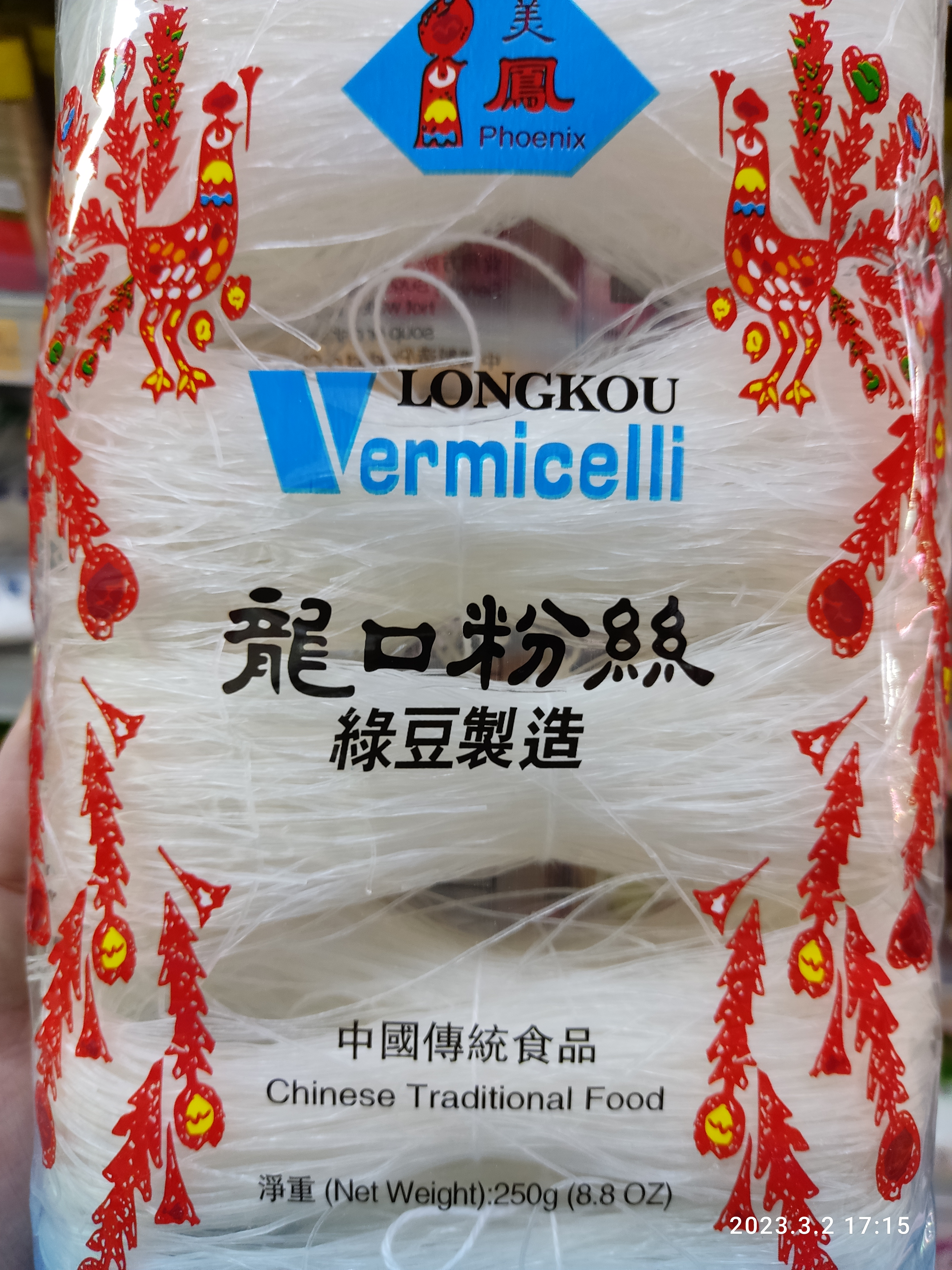
Vermicelli of Longkou

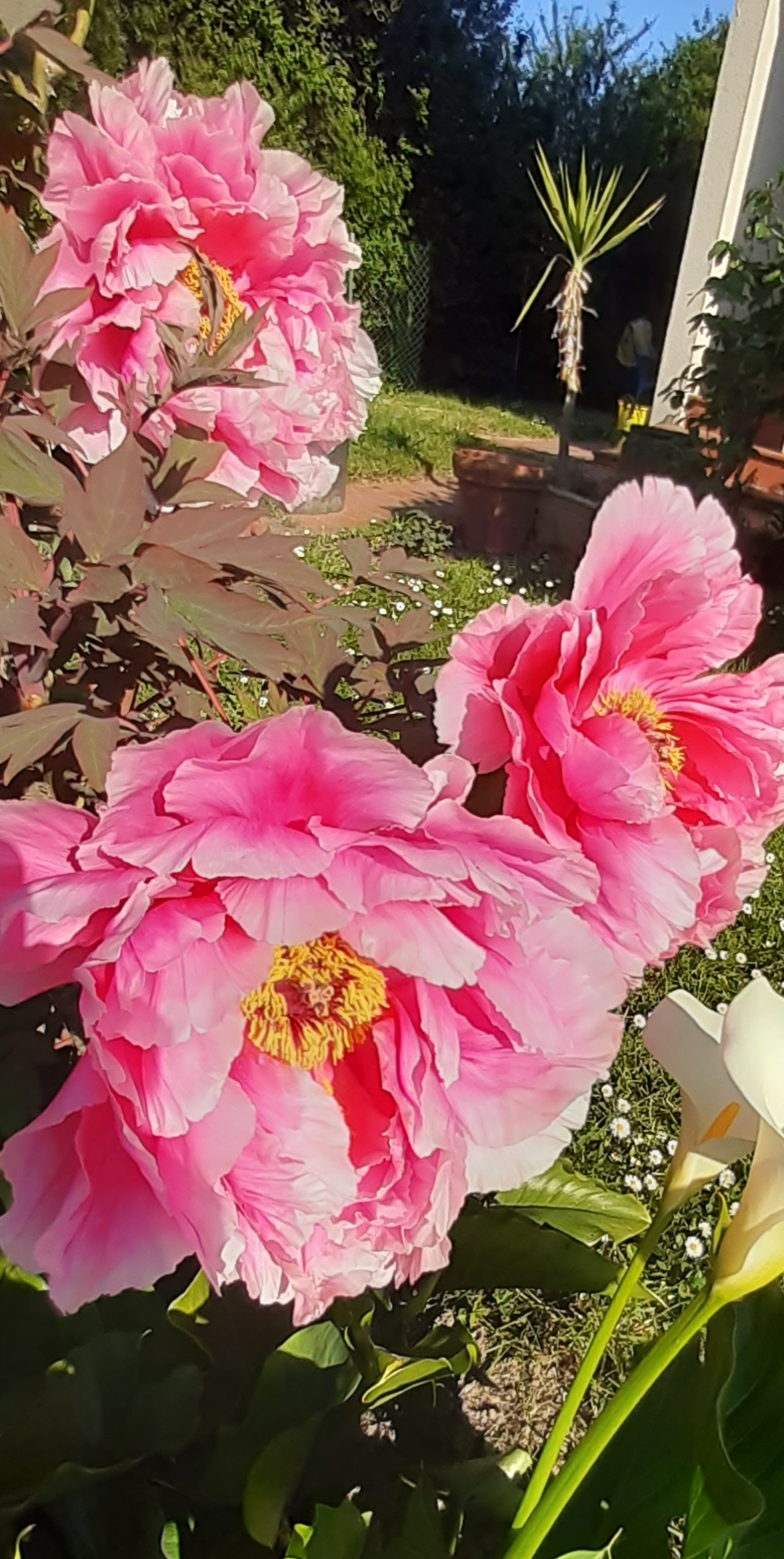
Peonies of Heze

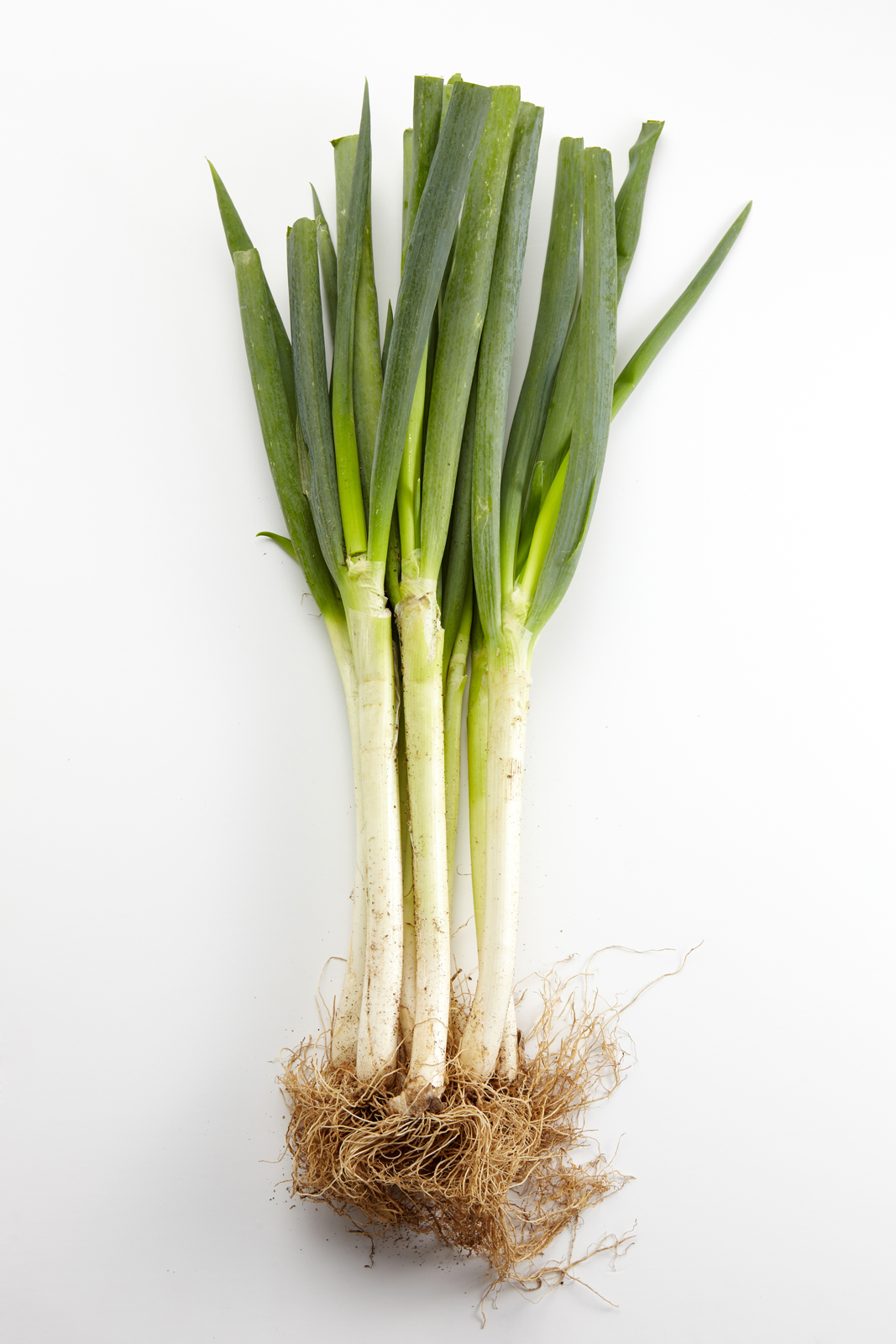
Scallions of Zhangqiu

Shandong is one of China's most important agricultural provinces. Its output value from farming, forestry, animal husbandry, by-products, and fisheries has consistently ranked first nationwide. The province is a major producer of grain, cotton, oilseeds, meat, eggs, and dairy. Shandong also has a highly developed agricultural industrialization system, and its agricultural exports have topped national rankings for decades.

The province's grain crops are typically grown in two seasons: summer and autumn. Summer crops are dominated by winter wheat, while autumn crops include maize, sweet potatoes, soybeans, rice, millet, sorghum, and other minor grains. Among them, wheat, corn, and sweet potatoes are the province's three major staples.

Shouguang is known as the birthplace of modern solar-heated greenhouses in China and is the country's largest vegetable production and distribution center. It has been designated the "Hometown of Vegetables in China" by the State Council. Vegetables from Shouguang are distributed to over 200 large and medium-sized cities in more than 30 provinces and regions across China and are also exported to countries such as Japan, South Korea, and Russia.

Shandong not only boasts abundant cultivated and livestock breeds, but also rich wild flora and fauna. In terms of plant resources, the province produces over 40 staple and cash crops such as wheat, corn, sweet potatoes, and peanuts, over 60 varieties of vegetables and melons, and more than 660 species of woody plants including fruit trees, tea, mulberry, and oak trees. There are over 1,350 species of wild economic plants, including those used for starch, oils, fibers, aromatic oils, tannins, medicinal uses, and natural pesticides.

In 2013, the following agricultural products were awarded the title of "Top 10 Geographical Indication Trademarks of Shandong": Zhanhua winter jujubes, Zhangqiu scallions, Rizhao green tea, Yantai apples, Jinxiang garlic, Rongcheng kelp, Pingyi honeysuckle, Jiaozhou cabbage, and Feicheng peaches.

Animal resources include over 10 types of domesticated livestock and poultry, 55 species of small and medium-sized mammals, and more than 270 species of birds (resident, summer migratory, winter migratory, and transit). There are also 563 species of beneficial predators to agricultural pests and 763 species of agricultural pests. Additionally, inland aquatic resources include more than 30 species of vascular aquatic plants and over 70 species of freshwater fish.

==== Fishery ====
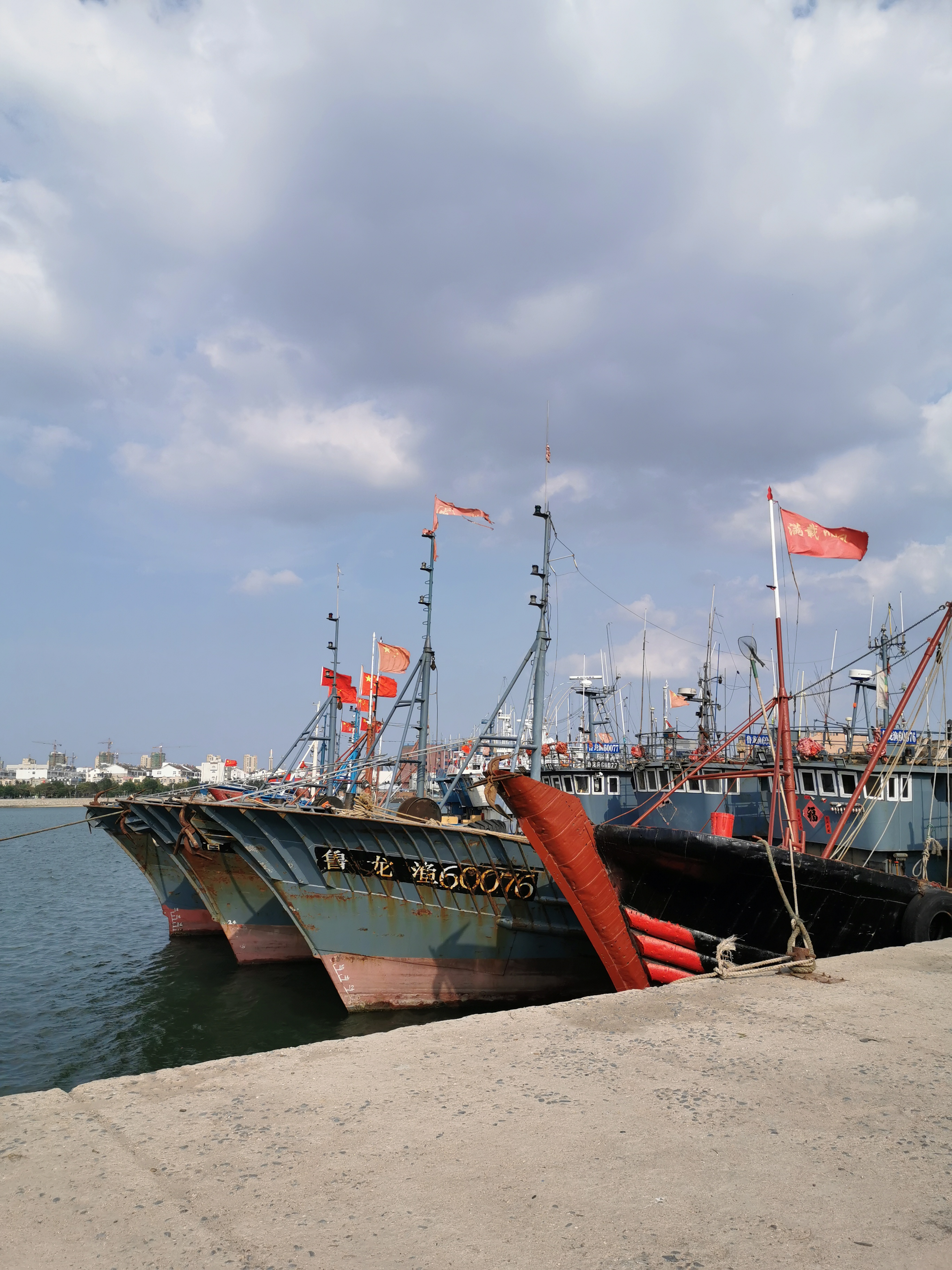
Fishing fleet at Longkou port

Fisheries are a traditional strength of Shandong's economy. In 2014, the province's total aquatic product output exceeded 9 million tons, with a total fishery output value of ¥360 billion, and over 12 million mu (about 800,000 hectares) of aquaculture area. Dominant marine aquaculture industries include sea cucumbers, kelp, prawns, flounder, sole, clams, and Chinese mitten crabs. Inland aquaculture is rapidly developing local specialties such as softshell turtles, Siniperca chuatsi, loach, and icefish.

==== Wine industry ====
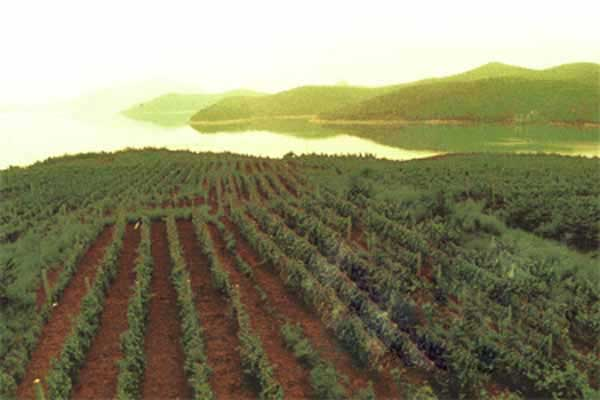
Shandong coastal vineyards

The production of wine is the second largest industry in the Shandong Province, second only to agriculture.

Geographically, the coastal areas remain relatively flat. Most of the soil is loose, well-ventilated, and rich in minerals and organic matter that enable full development of the root systems.

Presently, there are more than 140 wineries in the region, mainly distributed in the Nanwang Grape Valley and the Yan-Peng Sightseeing Highway (both are in Yantai). The region produced more than 40% of China's grape wine production. Main varieties such as Cabernet Sauvignon, Cabernet Gernischt, Merlot, Riesling and Chardonnay are all at 20 years of age, considered to be the golden stage for these grapes. Most of them maintain an average saccharinity of above 20%.

Major producers

- Changyu Pioneer Wine Co.
- China Great Wall Wine Co. Ltd.

=== Service sector ===
In 2015, the tertiary sector (services) accounted for 45.3% of Shandong Province's total economic output. In 2012, the value-added of the service sector accounted for 40% of GDP. The value-added of the financial sector reached ¥201.9 billion, representing a year-on-year increase of 19%; the real estate sector contributed ¥201.6 billion, up 6.5%; total revenue from tourism was ¥451.97 billion; and software business revenue from large-scale software enterprises amounted to ¥173.79 billion. In 2015, the financial sector's value-added accounted for 5% of Shandong's GDP, and its contribution to local tax revenue reached 10.7%, making it one of the province's pillar industries. By 2018, the province's three-sector economic structure had adjusted to a ratio of 6.5:44.0:49.5 (primary:secondary:tertiary), with the service sector contributing 60% to overall economic growth.

=== Economic and technological development zones ===
Jinan High-tech Industrial Development Zone

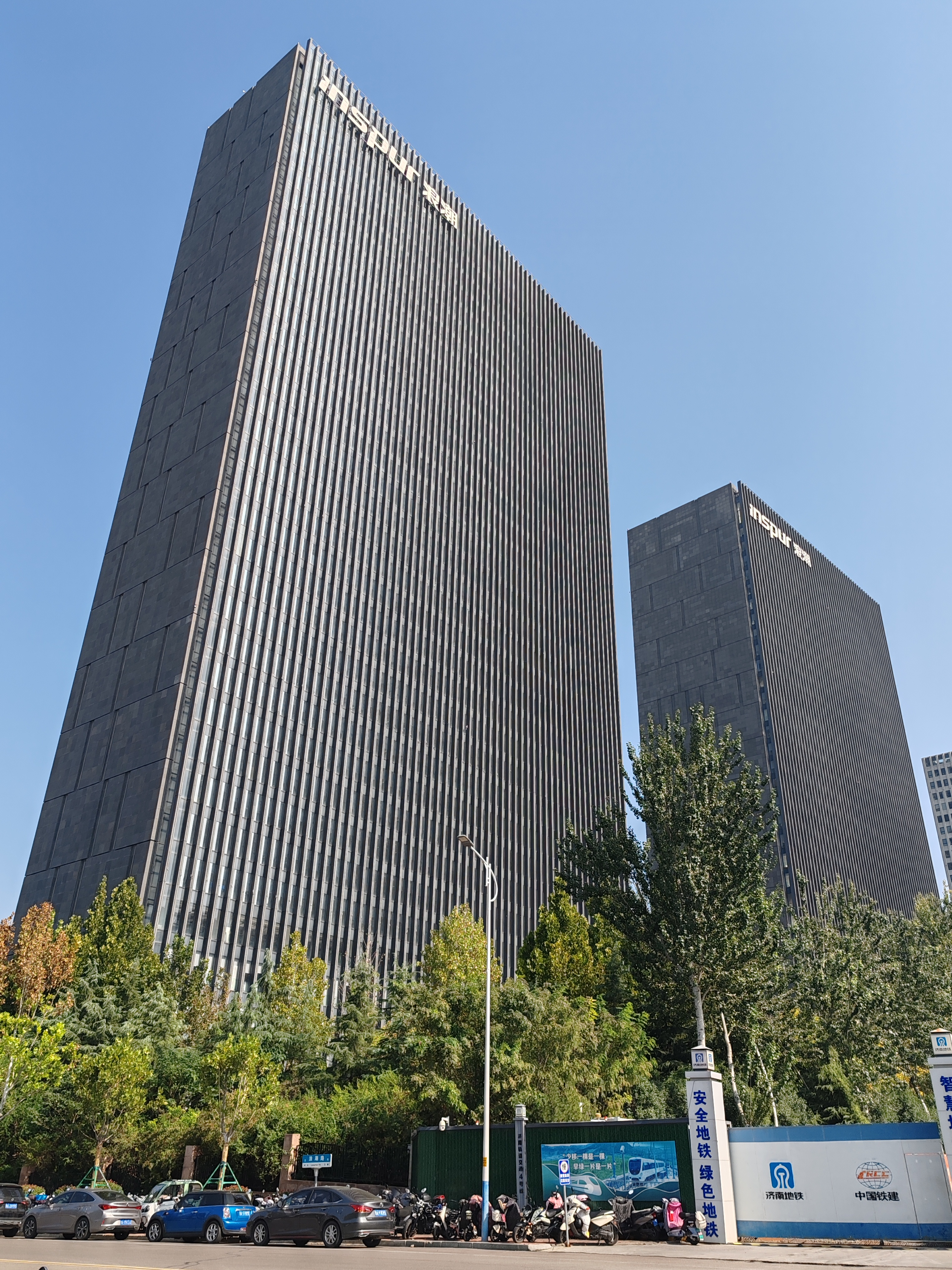
Inspur Group in Jinan High-tech Industrial Development Zone

Founded in 1991, the Jinan High-tech Industrial Development zone was one of the first of its kind approved by the State Council. The zone is located to the east of the city and covers a total planning area of 83 km^{2} (32 sq mi) that is divided into a central area covering 33 km^{2} (13 sq mi), an export processing district of 10 km^{2} (3.9 sq mi), and an eastern extension area of 40 km^{2} (15 sq mi). Since its foundation, the Jinan High-tech Industrial Development Zone has attracted enterprises as LG, Panasonic, Volvo, and Sanyo. In 2000, it joined the world science and technology association and set up a China-Ukraine High-tech Cooperation Park. The Qilu Software Park became the sister park of Bangalore park of India.

Jinan Export Processing Zone

The export processing zone is located in the eastern suburbs of Jinan, east of the Jinan High-tech Industrial Development Zone, and to the north of the Jiwang highway. The distances to the Jiqing Highway and the Jinan Airport are 9 and 18 km (5.6 and 11.2 mi) respectively.

Qingdao Economic & Technological Development Area

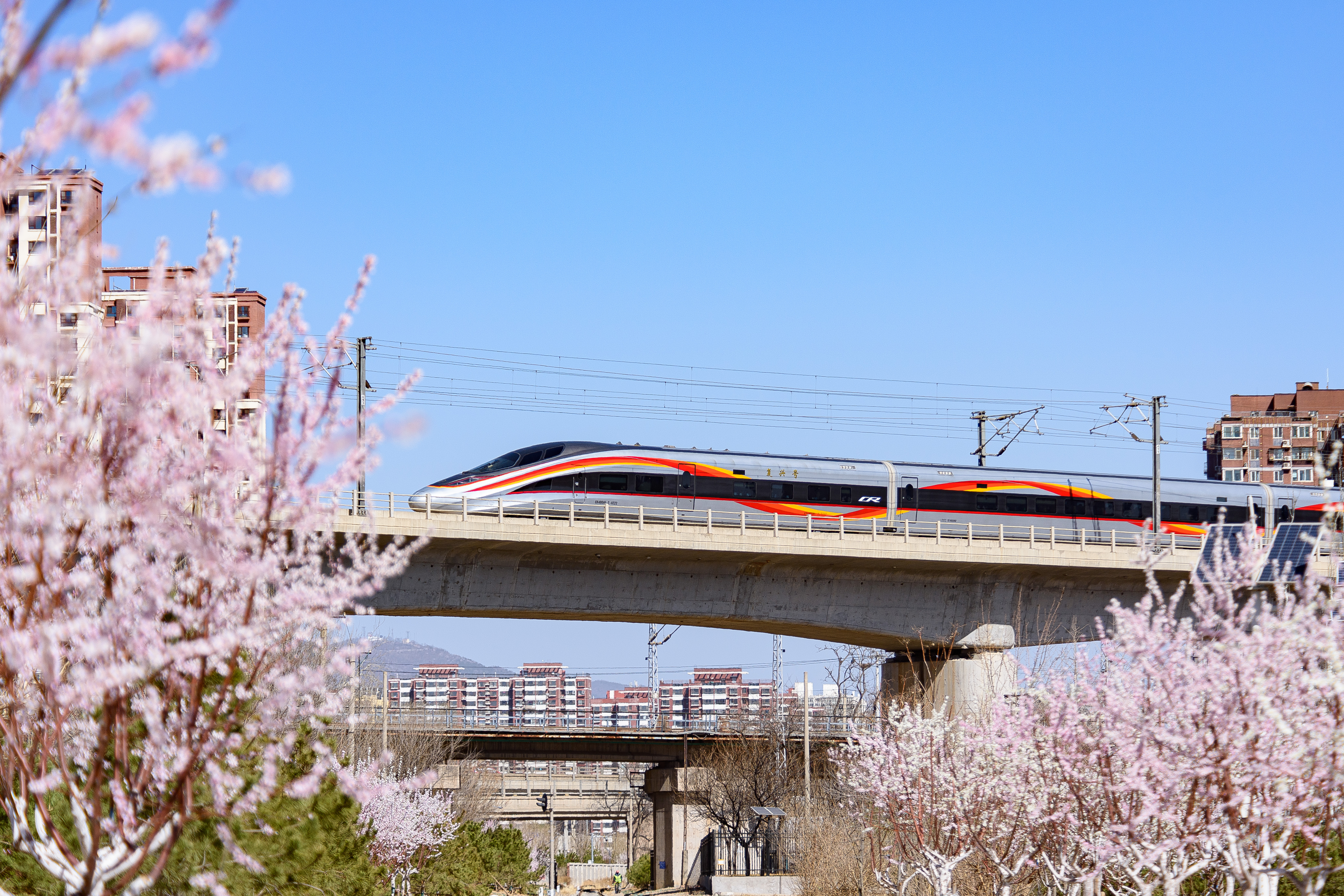
CR400AF produced by CRRC Qingdao Sifang

Approved by the State Council in October 1984, Qingdao Economic and Technical Development Zone has a plan of 12.5 km^{2} (4.8 sq mi). In 2004 the local GDP was ¥27.51 billion, which increased by 28.9%; the total industrial output value is ¥60.6 billion, which increased by 31%. There have been 48 projects invested by companies listed among the Global Fortune 500 in the zone. With the fast development of reform and opening-up, Haier, Hisense, Aucma, Sinopec, CSIC, CNOOC, CIMC etc. are all located in the zone.

Qingdao Free Trade Zone

The State Council established Qingdao Free Trade Zone in 1992. The zone is 60 km (37 mi) away from Qingdao Liuting Airport. It is also close to Qingdao Qianwan Container Terminal. At present, more than 40 foreign-invested enterprises have moved in, and 2000 projects have been approved. It is one of the special economic areas which enjoys the most favorable investment policies on customs, foreign exchange, foreign trade, and taxation in China.

Qingdao High-tech Industrial Zone

The State Council approved Qingdao High-Tech Industrial Development Zone in 1992. The zone is located close to Qingdao Liuting Airport and Qingdao Harbor. Encouraged industries include electronic information, biotechnology, medicine, new materials, new energy, advanced equipment manufacturing, marine science & technology, national defense technology.

Weifang Binhai Economic & Technological Development Area (BEDA)

Established in August 1995, Weifang Binhai Economic & Technological Development Area (BEDA) is a national economic and technological development area approved by the State Council. Covering an area of 677 km^{2} (261 sq mi), BEDA has a population of 100,000. BEDA possesses a large state-owned industrial land for use with an area of 400 km^{2} (150 sq mi). The land can be transacted conveniently, guaranteeing the demand of any project construction and providing broad development space for the enterprises in the area. Continuously, BEDA has been accredited as National Demonstration Zone invigorating the Sea by Science and Technology, National Innovation Base for Rejuvenating Trade through Science and Technology and National Demonstration Eco-Industry Park.

Weihai Economic & Technological Development Zone

Weihai Economic and Technological Development Zone is a state-level development zone approved by the State Council on 21 Oct 1992. The administrative area has an area of 194 km^{2} (75 sq mi), including the programmed area of 36 km^{2} (14 sq mi) and an initial area of 11.88 km^{2} (4.59 sq mi). Its nearest port is Weihai Port, and the airport closest to the zone is Wuhai Airport.

Weihai Export Processing Zone

Weihai Export & Processing Zone (EPZ) was set up by the approval of the State Council on 27 April 2000. Weihai EPZ is located in Weihai Economic & Technological Development Zone with programmed area of 2.6 km^{2} (1.0 sq mi). Weihai EPZ belongs to comprehensive export & processing zone. The EPZ is located 30 km (19 mi) to Weihai Airport, 3 km (1.9 mi) to Weihai railway station and 4 km (2.5 mi) to Weihai Harbor.

Weihai Torch Hi-Tech Science Park

Weihai Torch Hi-Tech Science Park is a state-level development zone approved by the State Council in March 1991. Located in Weihai's northwest zone of culture, education and science, the Park has the total area of 111.9 square kilometers (43.2 sq mi), the coastal line of 30.5 kilometers (19.0 mi) and 150,000 residents. It is 3 km (1.9 mi) away from the city center, 4 km (2.5 mi) away from Weihai Port, 10 km (6.2 mi) away from Weihai railway station, 30 km (19 mi) away from Weihai Airport and 80 km (50 mi) away from Yantai Airport.

Yantai Economic and Technological Development Area

Yantai Economic and Technological Development Area is one of the earliest approved state level economic development zones in China. It now has planned area of 10 km^{2} (3.9 sq mi) and a population of 115,000. It lies on the tip of the Shandong Peninsula facing the Yellow Sea. It adjoins to downtown Yantai, merely 6 km (3.7 mi) away from Yantai Port, 6 km (3.7 mi) away from Yantai railway station, and a 30-minute drive to Yantai International Airport.

Yantai Export Processing Zone

Yantai Export Processing Zone (YTEPZ) is one of the first 15 export processing zones approved by the State Council. The total construction area of YTEPZ is 4.17 m^{2} (44.9 sq ft), in which the initial zone covers 3 km^{2} (1.2 sq mi). After developing for several years, YTEPZ is completely constructed. At present, the infrastructure has been completed, standard workshops of 120,000 m^{2} (140,000 sq yd) and bonded warehouses of 40,000 m^{2} (430,000 sq ft) have been built up. Up to now, owning perfect investment environment and conditions, YTEPZ has attracted investors both from foreign countries and regions such as Japan, Korea, Singapore, Hong Kong, Taiwan, Sweden, the United States, Canada, etc., and from the domestic to invest and operate in the zone.

Zibo National New & Hi-Tech Industrial Development Zone

== Demographics ==
Historical population
Year	Pop.	±%
1912	30,989,000	—
1928	28,672,000	−7.5%
1936-37	38,100,000	+32.9%
1947	38,865,000	+2.0%
1954	48,876,548	+25.8%
1964	55,519,038	+13.6%
1982	74,419,054	+34.0%
1990	84,392,827	+13.4%
2000	89,971,789	+6.6%
2010	95,793,065	+6.5%
2020	101,527,453	+6.0%
Qingdao was part of Shandong Province until 1929; dissolved in 1949 and incorporated into Shandong Province. Weihai, also known as Weihaiwei. Established in 1930, dissolved in 1945, and incorporated into Shandong Province.

Accurate population statistics for Shandong Province began during the Han dynasty, and its development since then can be divided into four stages. In 2 AD, the population in the area of present-day Shandong Province was over 12 million, and it exceeded 30 million for the first time by 1830—this was the first stage. From 1841 to 1949, the second stage, the population of Shandong grew steadily, reaching 45 million by 1949. During the 1950s and 1960s, Shandong experienced rapid population growth, followed by family planning policies in the 1970s and 1980s. By 1988, the population reached over 80 million. According to the 2010 national census, the permanent population of Shandong was 95.7931 million. In 2015, 1.2358 million people were born, and the year-end permanent population reached 98.4716 million. Among them, the 0–14 age group accounted for 16.62% of the total population, the 15–64 age group accounted for 71.17%, and those aged 65 and over accounted for 12.21%. With a population of more than 101,527,453 at the 2020 Chinese census, the permanent population of Shandong exceeded 100 million, ranking second in China after Guangdong Province and slightly ahead of Henan.

According to the 2010 national census, 8.3287 million people had attained a university level of education, 13.3226 million had a high school education, 38.4682 million had a junior high school education, and 23.9124 million had a primary school education. The illiterate population was 4.7573 million, with an illiteracy rate of 4.97%. Shandong has achieved a high level of compulsory education: in 2016, the net enrollment rate for primary school-age children was 99.97%, and the retention rate for compulsory education was 97.2%.

By the end of 2014, there were 2.615 million people aged over 80 in the province, and 5,932 people aged over 100. The average life expectancy was 73.42 years in 2000, 76.46 years in 2010, and was projected to reach 78 years in 2016. In 2009, Laizhou was recognized by the China Gerontological Society as a "Longevity Town of China". It was the tenth such town in China, the first in Shandong Province, and also the first in Northern China.

Among the 16 prefecture-level cities, two had populations exceeding 10 million: Linyi with 11.018 million, and Qingdao with 10.072 million. Among the total resident population, 51.433 million were male (50.66%) and 50.095 million were female (49.34%). The overall sex ratio was 102.67, and the birth sex ratio was 111.95. The population aged 0–14 was 19.063 million (18.78%), those aged 15–59 were 61.244 million (60.32%), and those aged 60 and over were 21.221 million (20.90%), of whom 15.364 million (15.13%) were aged 65 and above. Among the total resident population, 14.603 million had a college education or above, and 14.553 million had a high school education (including technical secondary school). The average years of schooling among the population aged 15 and above was 9.75 years, and the illiteracy rate was 3.26%. 64.014 million people lived in urban areas (63.05%), while 37.513 million lived in rural areas (36.95%).

Shandong citizens are also known to have the tallest average height of any Chinese province. As of 2010, 16-18-year-old male students in Yantai measured 176.4 centimetres (5 ft 9.4 in) while female students measured 164 cm (5 ft 5 in).

Total population of Shandong by year

=== Ethnicity ===
As of March 2015, there were 55 ethnic minority groups in Shandong Province, with a total resident population of 720,000, accounting for 0.75% of the province's total population. Among them, the Hui ethnic group numbered 540,000, accounting for 75% of the total ethnic minority population in the province. There are four Hui townships in the province, they are town of Jinling, Zibo, town of Shiliwang, Dezhou, town of Zhanglu, Liaocheng, and town of Houji, Heze.

On 21 May 2021, the main data of the seventh national population census in Shandong Province was released. The data showed that the total resident population was 101.527 million, of which 100.622 million were Han Chinese, accounting for 99.11%, and 905,000 were ethnic minorities, accounting for 0.89%.

In addition, there are considerable Korean diaspora in Shandong; for example, Qingdao has a Korean population of over 100,000, accounting for about 7.19% of total Koreans in China.

Ethnic groups in Shandong according to the 2020 Chinese census
Ethnicity	Male	Female	Total population	Percentage
Han	50,981,231	49,641,263	100,622,494	99.109%
Hui	279,413	272,802	552,215	0.544%
Mongol	19,360	18,294	37,654	0.037%
Zang (Tibetan)	1,851	2,501	4,352	0.004%
Other ethnic groups	151,076	159,662	310,738	0.003%
Total	51,432,931	50,094,522	101,527,453	100%

=== Religion ===
Religion in Shandong (Note: The data was collected by the Chinese General Social Survey (CGSS) of 2009 and by the Chinese Spiritual Life Survey (CSLS) of 2007, reported and assembled by Xiuhua Wang (2015) in order to confront the proportion of people identifying with two similar social structures: ① Christian churches, and ② the traditional Chinese religion of the lineage (i.e. people believing and worshipping ancestral deities often organised into lineage "churches" and ancestral shrines). Data for other religions with a significant presence in China (deity cults, Buddhism, Taoism, folk religious sects, Islam, et al.) was not reported by Wang. The number of Muslims is taken from a survey reported in the year 2010.)
1. Chinese ancestral religion (25.3%)
2. Christianity (1.21%)
3. Islam (0.55%)
4. Other religions or not religious people (Note: This may include: Buddhists; Confucians; Deity worshippers; Taoists; Members of folk religious sects; People not bounded to, nor practicing any, institutional or diffuse religion) (70.0%)

The predominant religions in Shandong are Chinese folk religions, Taoist traditions and Chinese Buddhism. According to surveys conducted in 2007 and 2009, 25.28% of the population believes in ancestor veneration, while 1.21% of the population identifies as Christian, decreasing from 1.30% in 2004. The Christians were 1.89% of the province's population in 1949, the largest proportion in China at that time. According to a survey of the year 2010, Muslims constitute 0.55% of Shandong's population up from 0.14% in 1949.

The reports did not give figures for other types of religion; 80.05% of the population may be either irreligious or involved in worship of nature deities, Buddhism, Confucianism, Taoism, and folk religious sects. Shandong is the province where Confucius was born in the year 551 B.C.

The most well-known religion and/or philosophy of Shandong is Confucianism. Shandong is the birthplace of Confucius and his disciples such as Mencius, Zisi, Zengzi, and Yan Hui. Each year thousands of people come to Shandong to visit and learn about Confucius' culture. According to Chinese tradition, Confucius was a thinker, political figure, educator, and founder of the Confucianism of Chinese thought. His teachings, preserved in the Lunyu or Analects, form the foundation of much of subsequent Chinese speculation on the ideal man's education and comportment, how such an individual should live his life and interact with others, and the forms of society and government in which he should participate. Confucius also helped edit The Five Classics (五經), which include Classic of Poetry, Book of Documents, Book of Rites, I Ching, and Spring and Autumn Annals.

Taoism also has had a significant historical presence in Shandong, a province rich in religious and philosophical traditions. During the Han and Tang dynasties, Taoist practices flourished in the province, especially in the sacred Mount Tai, which has long been a center for Taoist pilgrimage and ritual. Taoist priests performed ceremonies there to communicate with the heavens and seek blessings for peace and prosperity. There are numerous Taoist temples, such as the Dai Temple at the foot of Mount Tai built during the Song dynasty. The coast part is associated with Taoist culture such as master Qiu Chuji and Eight Immortals.

Due to the presence of Hui people (also called Muslim Han people), there are several mosques in western Shandong. The history of Chrisitanity in Shandong began in the 1860s, when Qing government opened Chefoo. The most influential churches are affiliated with the Southern Baptist Convention, American Presbyterian Church, BMS World Mission and Society of the Divine Word. However, after the communist took power, foreign missionaries and clergies were expelled and the Christian church was suppressed. Today there are roughly 1.5 million Christians in Shandong; the exact number is hard to get, because there are a large number of people affiliated to home church.

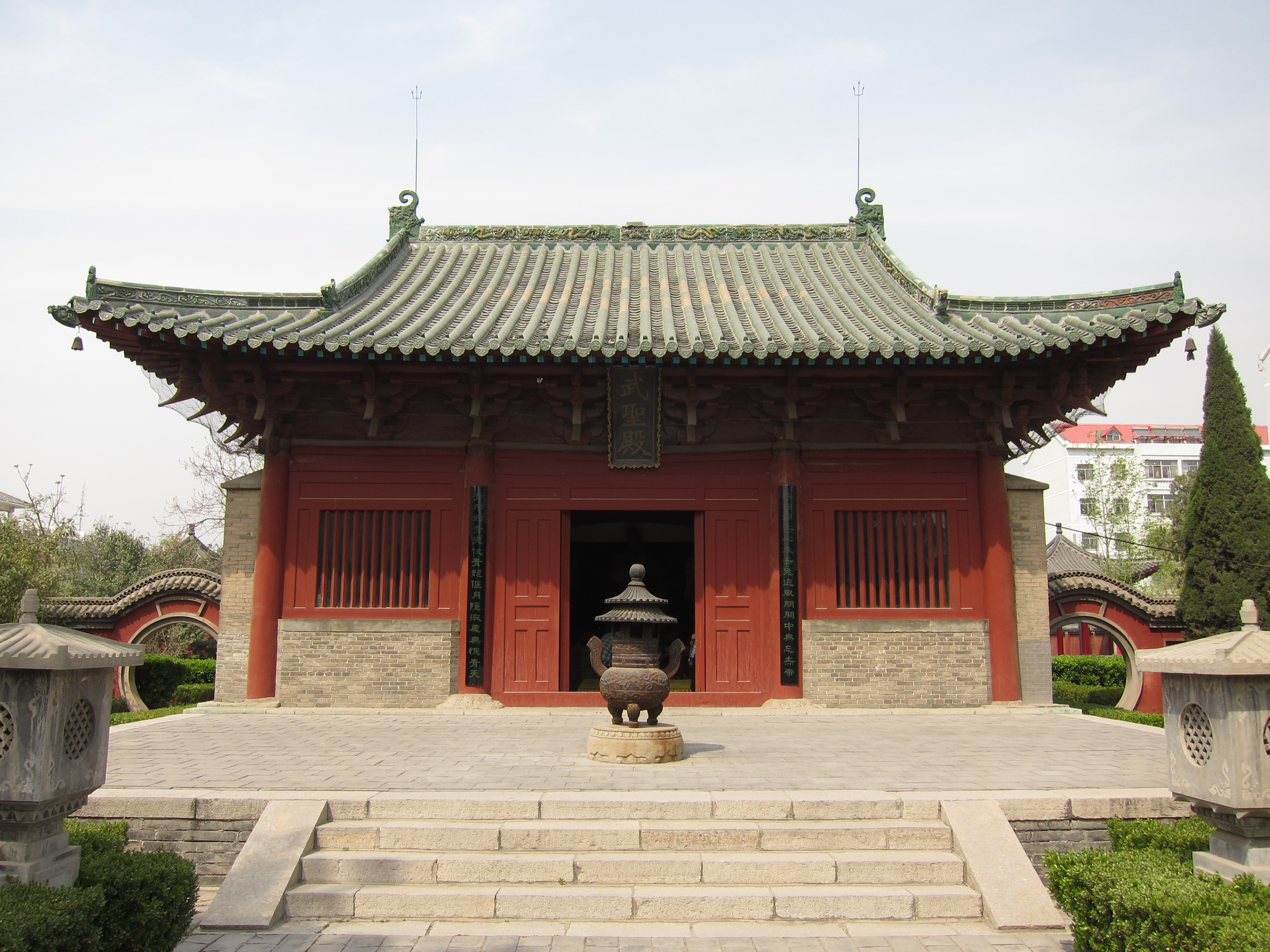
Temple of Guandi in Guangrao; built in 1028, making it the oldest extant wooden building in the province

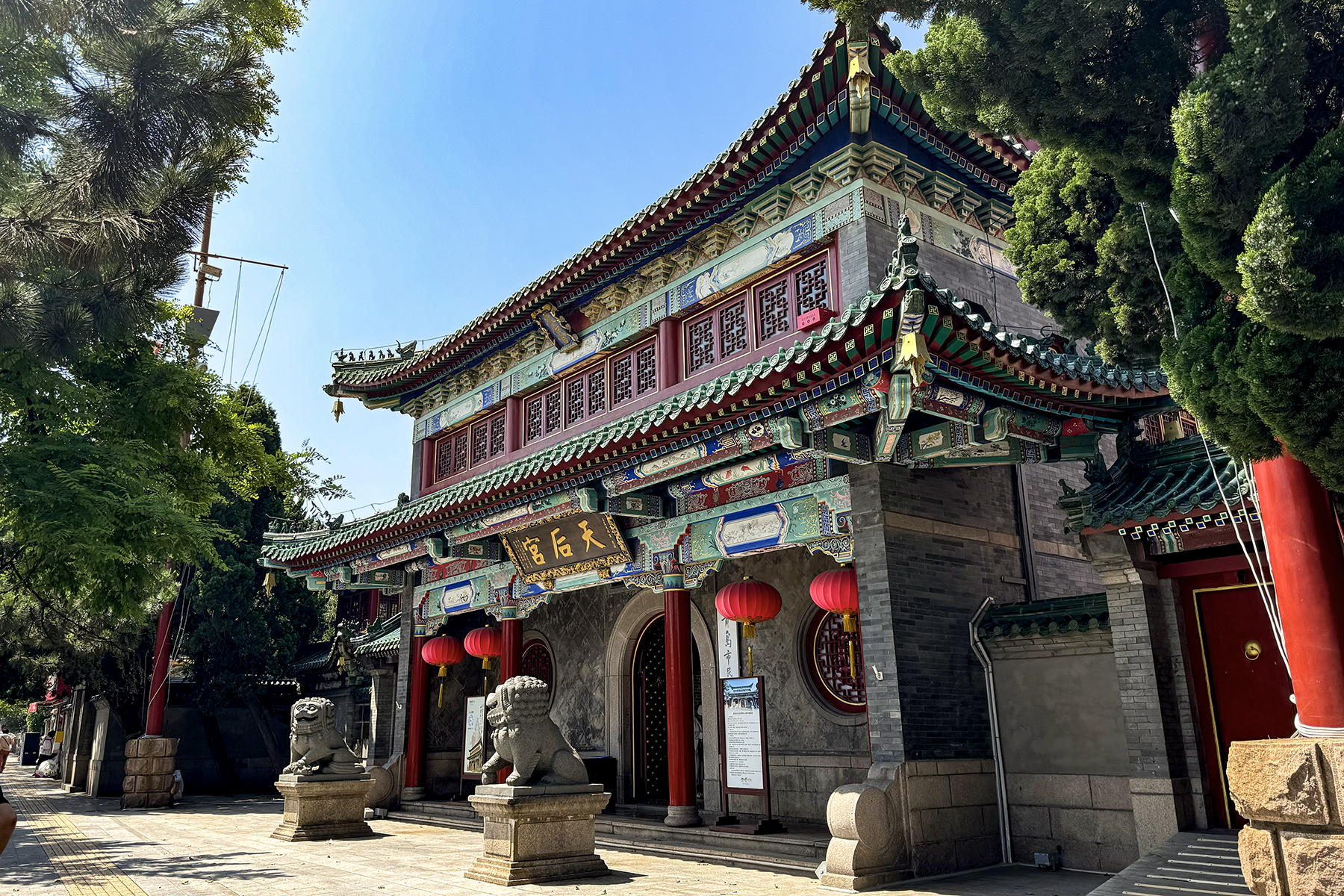
Temple of Mazu in Shinan

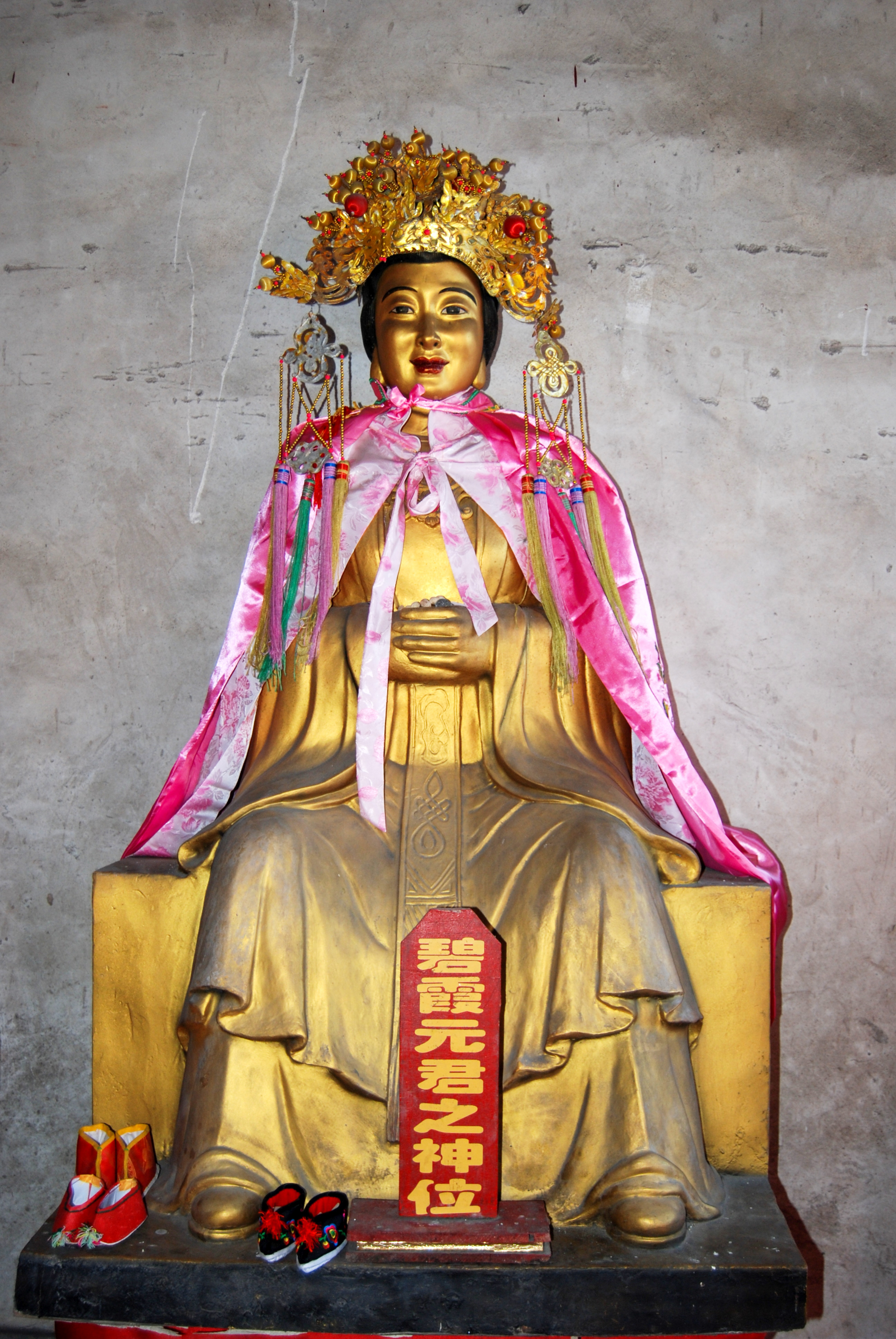
Statue of Bixia Yuanjun of Mount Tai, a Taoist goddess

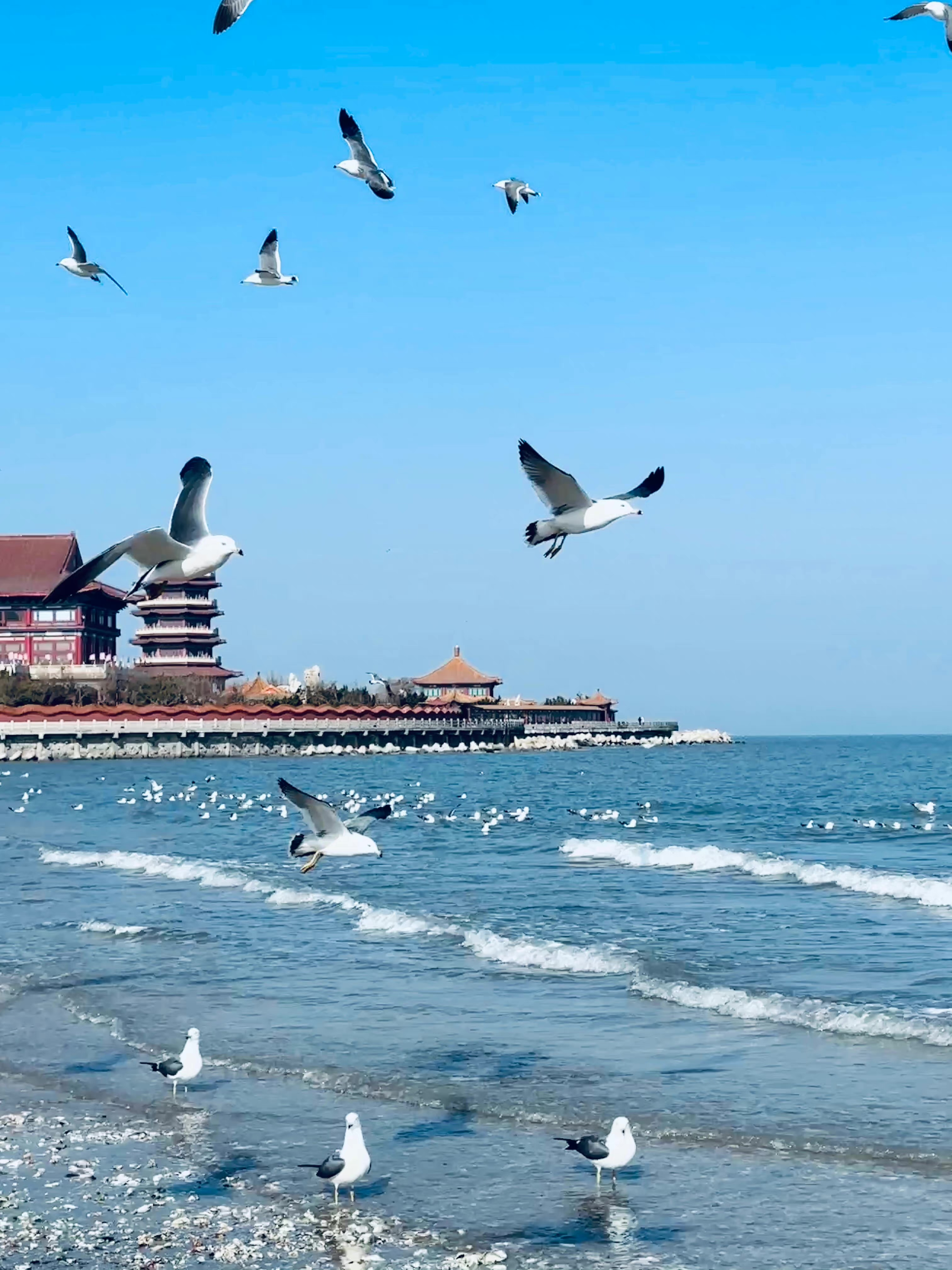
Penglai, where Eight Immortals Crossing the Sea said to take place

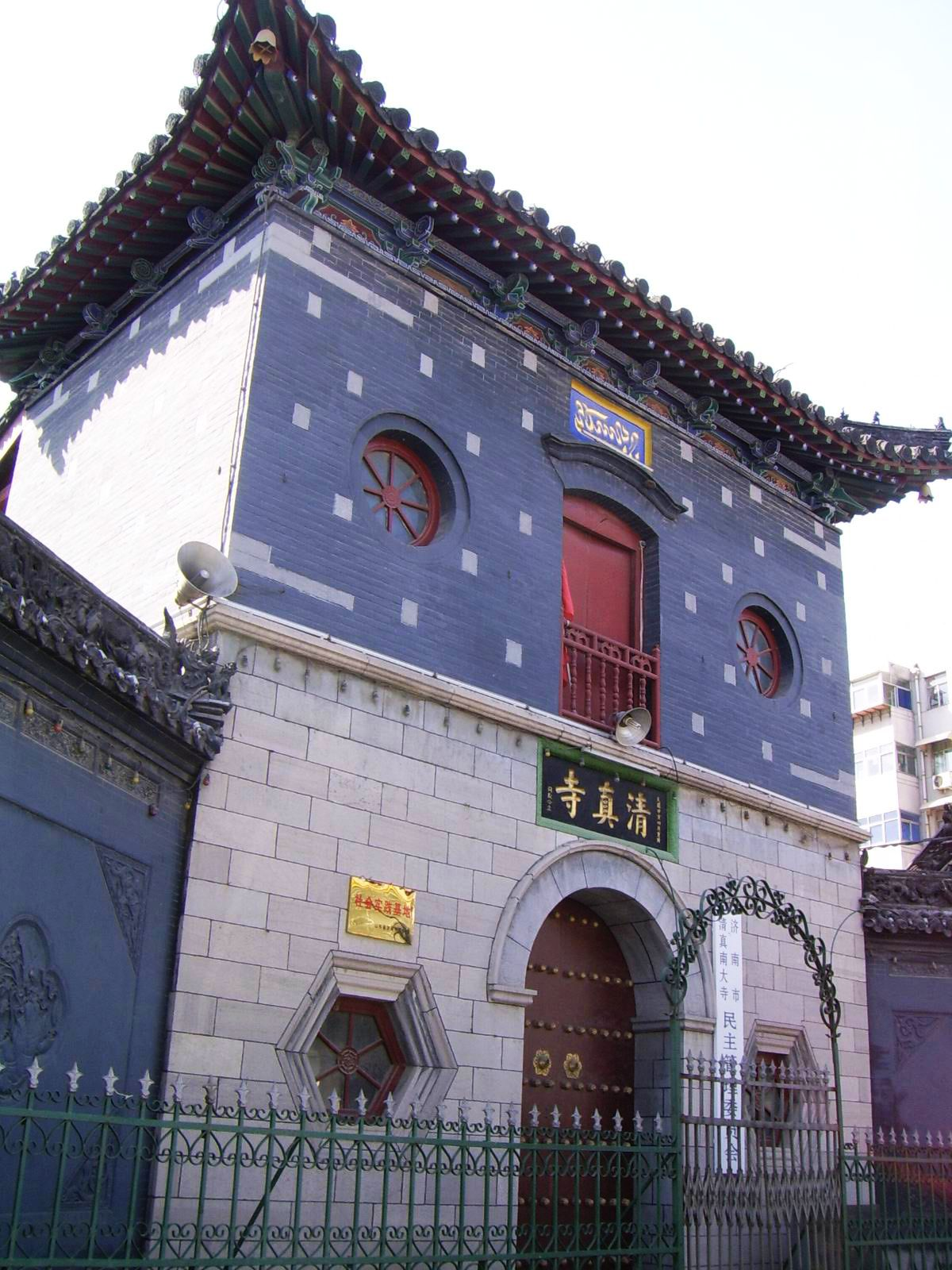
South Mosque of Jinan, an Islamic place of worship

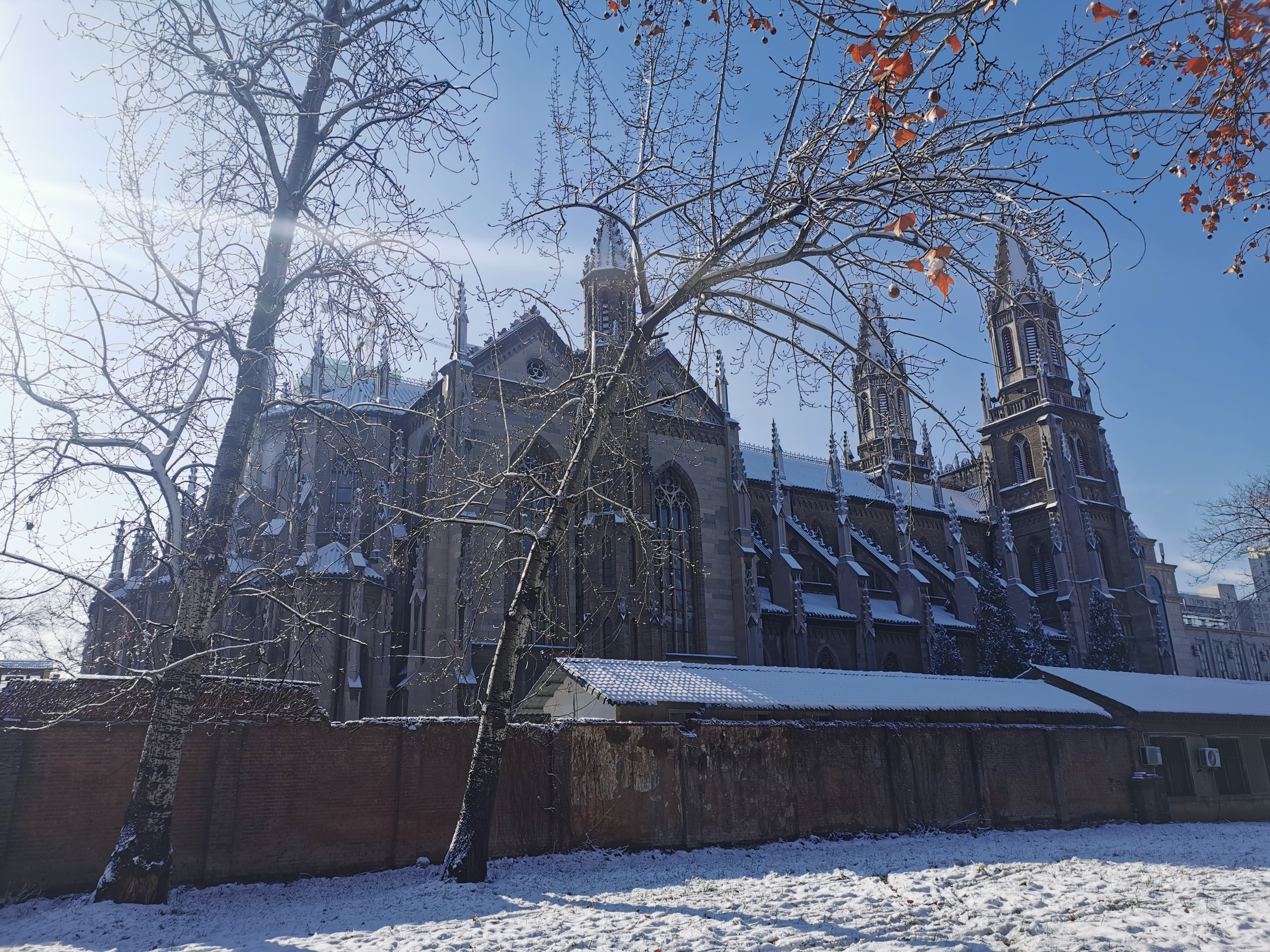
Hongjialou Catholic Church in Licheng

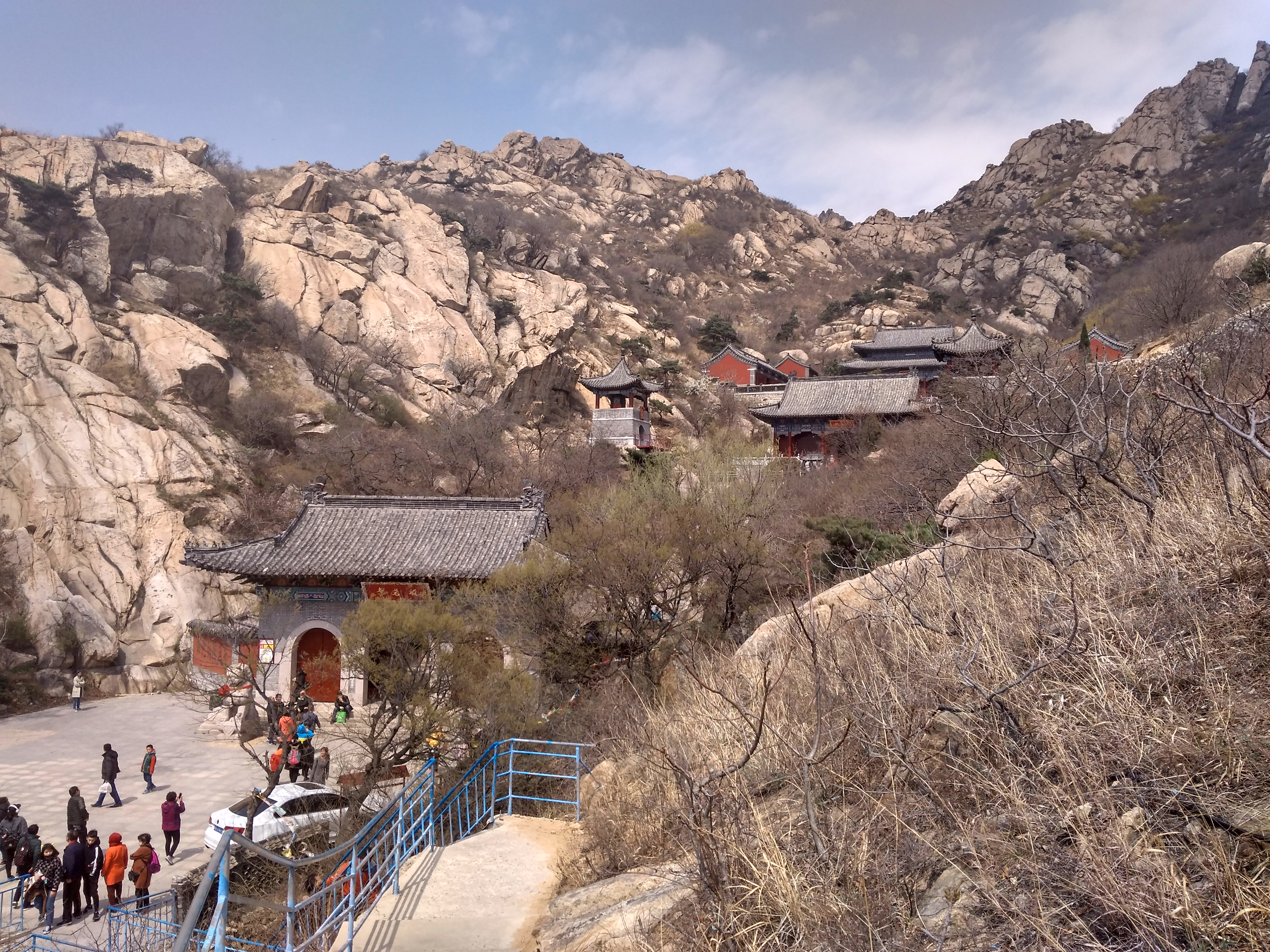
Buddhist Banruo Temple in Pingdu

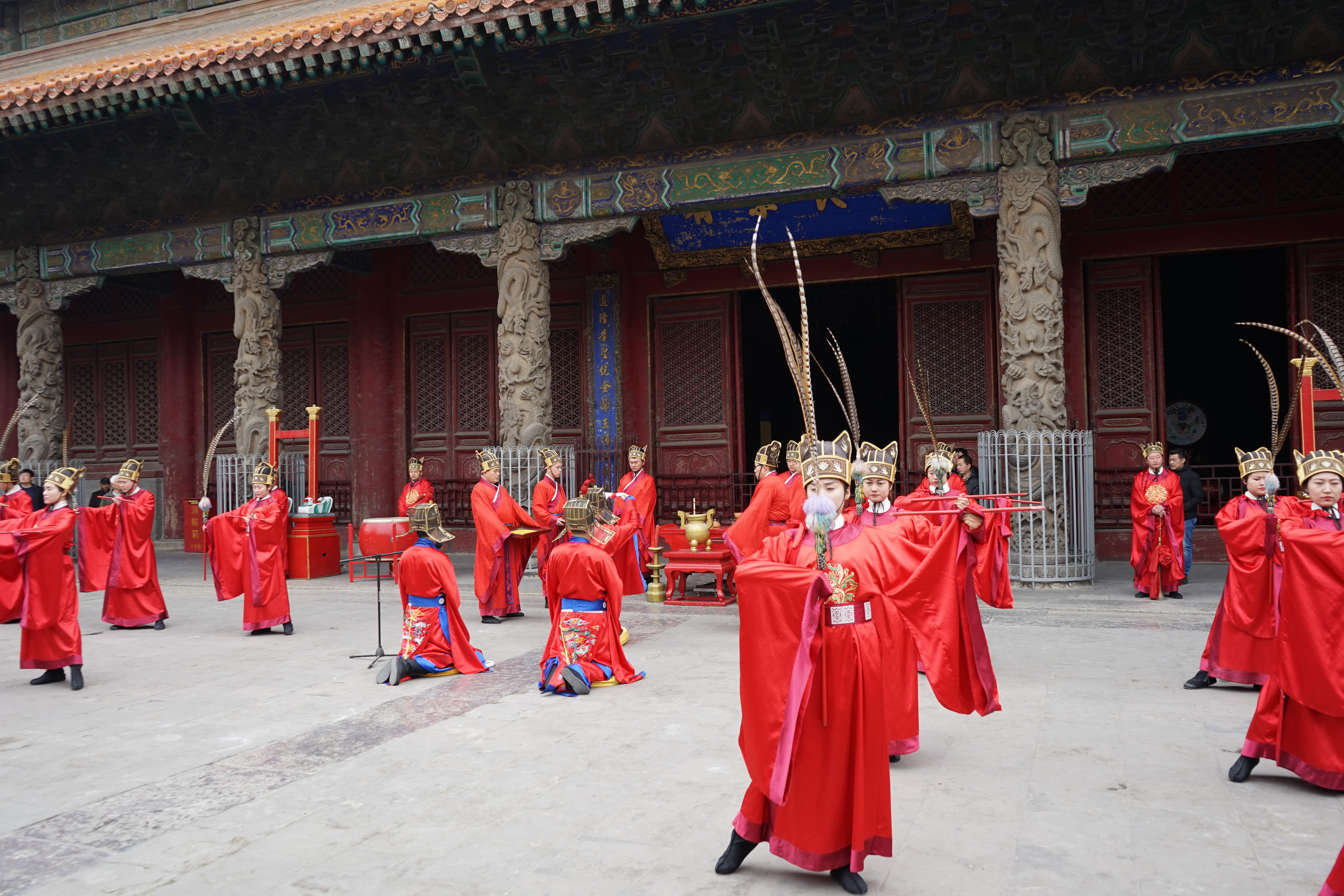
Temple of Confucius in Qufu during a sacrificial ceremony

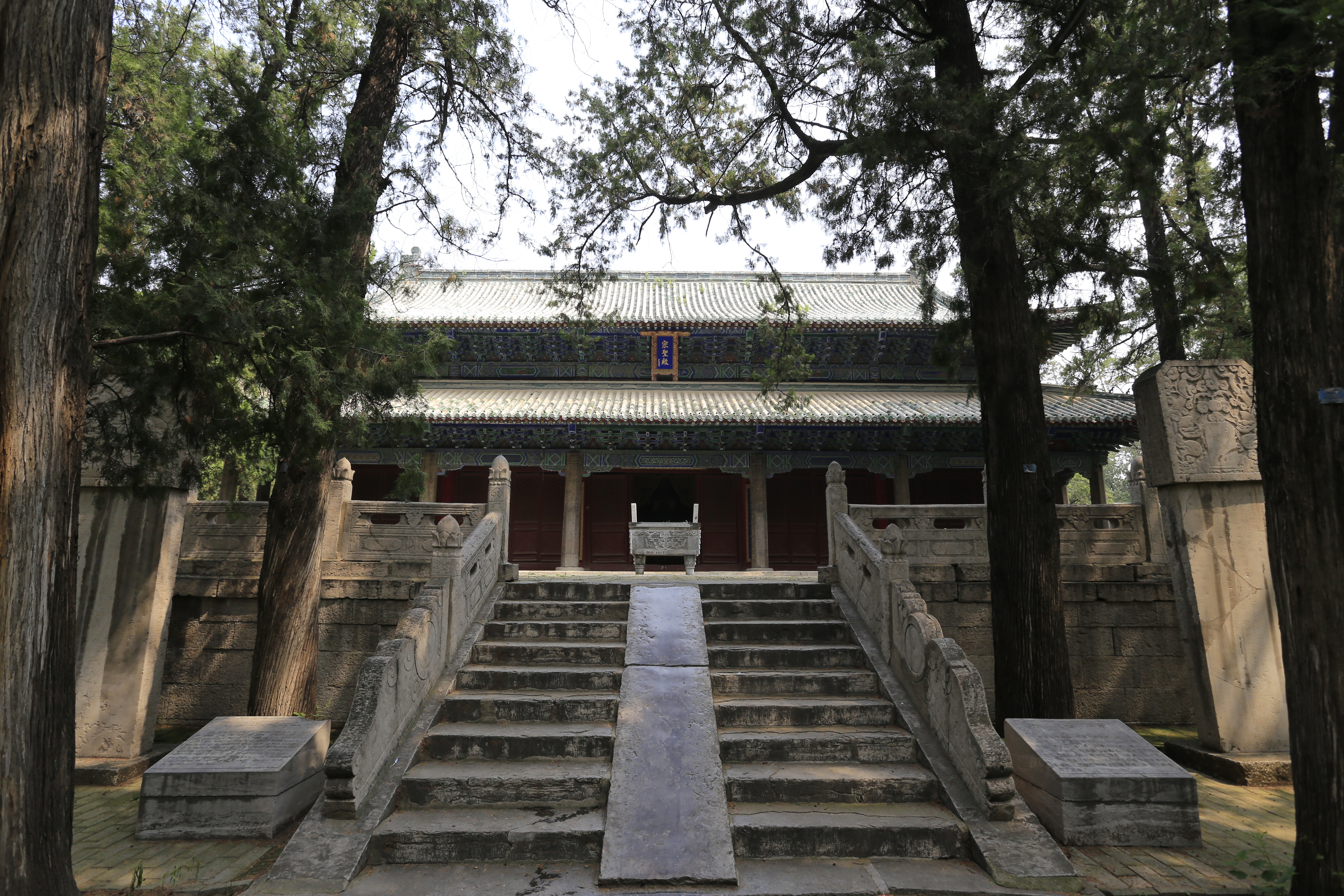
Temple of Zengzi in Jiaxiang, which is dedicated to Zengzi

== Administrative divisions ==
=== Historical divisions ===
The commandery-county system of the Qin dynasty, the basis of modern administrative divisions in Shandong

During the Qin dynasty, the commandery-county system was implemented in Shandong. In the Han dynasty, two provinces (first-level divisions) were established in what is now Shandong: Qing Province in the north and Yan Province in the south. Most of Shandong belonged to Henan Circuit during the Tang dynasty. In the Northern Song dynasty, the area was part of the Jingdong Circuit, which was later split into Jingdong East Circuit and Jingdong West Circuit. In the eighth year of the Dading reign of the Jin dynasty (1168), the military command offices of Shandong East Circuit and Shandong West Circuit were established. The term "Shandong" thus came into use as a formal administrative name.

In the Ming dynasty, the province of Shandong was established, later renamed the Shandong Provincial Administration Commission (山東等處承宣布政使司), with its seat in Jinan Prefecture. Jinan has since remained the provincial capital. The Shandong Administration Commission governed 6 prefectures, 15 sub-prefectures (zhous), and 89 counties.

During the Qing dynasty, the Shandong Administration Commission was renamed Shandong Province, and its highest official was the Provincial Governor (Xunfu). The province was divided into circuits (dao), prefectures (zhou and fu), and counties (xian). Additionally, some counties such as Qingyun County, Ningjin County, and Dongming County in Zhili Province (present-day Hebei) are now part of Shandong.

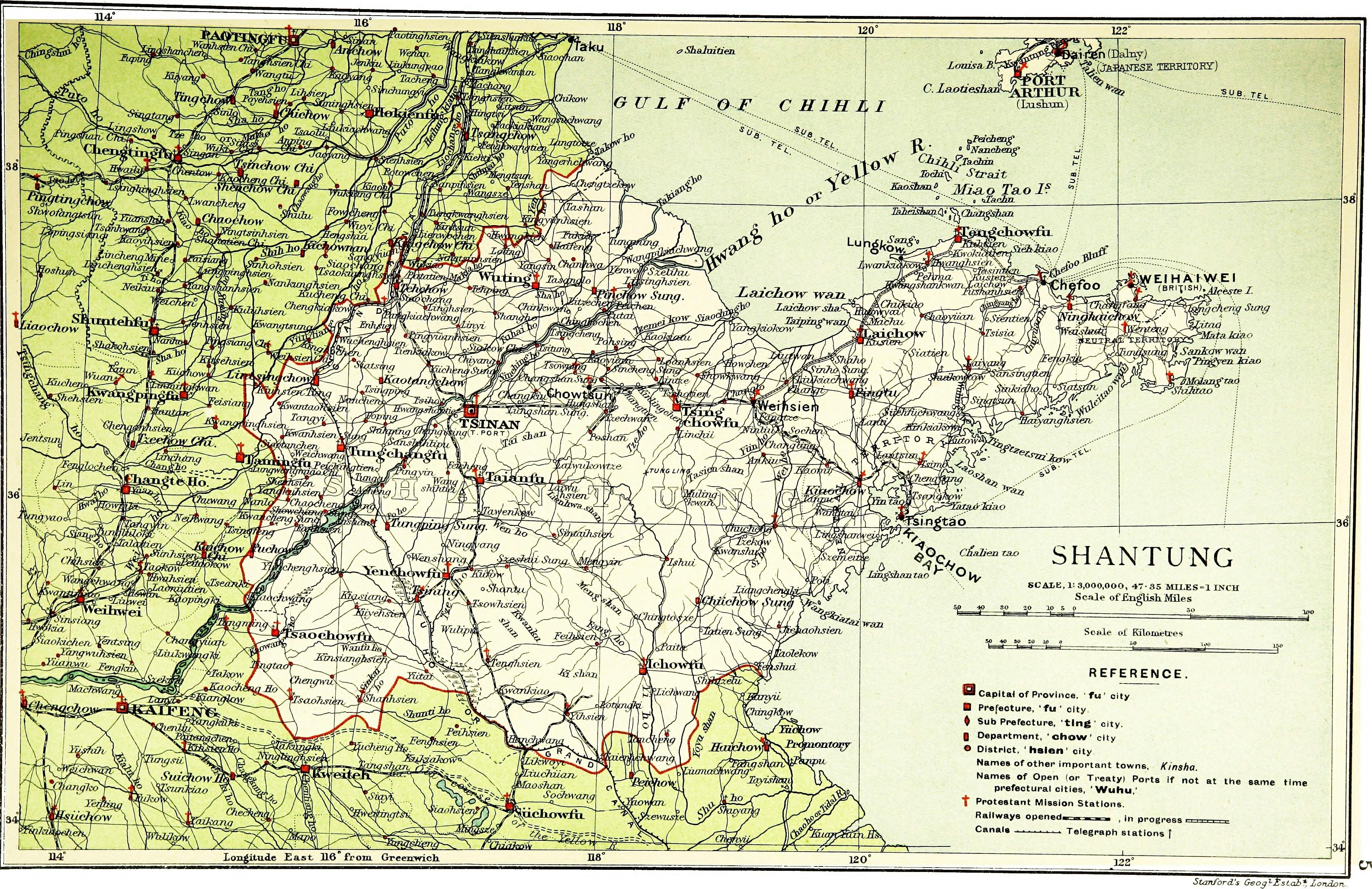
Map of Shandong in 1917

After the founding of the Republic of China in 1912, the Shandong Province initially retained the Qing administrative system. In 1913, the Beijing government abolished the prefectures and sub-prefectures, instituting the dao–county system. In 1927, the Nanjing government abolished the dao level, placing counties directly under provincial jurisdiction. In 1932, administrative inspectorates were established below the provincial level, functioning as provincial extensions. This marked the formal establishment of administrative inspectorate districts.

In 1950, three administrative regions were abolished, reducing 16 prefectures to 11. In 1952, Pingyuan Province was dissolved; its eastern part was incorporated into Shandong. At the same time, five counties from Hebei Province were transferred to Shandong, while some counties under Shandong's jurisdiction were reassigned to Hebei and Jiangsu.

In 1967, prefectures (专区) were renamed regions (地区), and the province then had 9 regions including Dezhou, Huimin, and Changwei, as well as four provincial cities: Jinan, Qingdao, Zibo, and Zaozhuang.

On 26 December 2018, the State Council officially approved the administrative adjustment of Laiwu under Jinan's jurisdiction, abolishing Laiwu as a separate prefecture-level city and merging its territory into Jinan. As a result, the province now comprises 16 prefecture-level cities.

=== Current divisions ===
Shandong is divided into 16 prefecture-level divisions: all prefecture-level cities (including two sub-provincial cities). On 1 January 2019, Laiwu was wholly annexed to Jinan:

Administrative divisions of Shandong
Division code	Division	Area in km^{2}	Population (2020)	Seat	Divisions		
Division code	Division	Area in km^{2}	Population (2020)	Seat	Districts	Counties	CL cities
370000	Shandong Province	157,100.00	101,527,453	Jinan city	58	52	26
370100	Jinan city	10,247.01	9,202,432	Lixia District	10	2	
370200	Qingdao city	11,175.30	10,071,722	Shinan District	7		3
370300	Zibo city	5,965.17	4,704,138	Zhangdian District	5	3	
370400	Zaozhuang city	4,563.22	3,855,601	Xuecheng District	5		1
370500	Dongying city	7,923.26	2,193,518	Dongying District	3	2	
370600	Yantai city	13,746.47	7,102,116	Laishan District	5		6
370700	Weifang city	16,143.14	9,386,705	Kuiwen District	4	2	6
370800	Jining city	11,186.98	8,357,897	Rencheng District	2	7	2
370900	Tai'an city	7,761.83	5,472,217	Taishan District	2	2	2
371000	Weihai city	5,796.98	2,906,548	Huancui District	2		2
371100	Rizhao city	5,347.99	2,968,365	Donggang District	2	2	
371300	Linyi city	17,191.21	11,018,365	Lanshan District	3	9	
371400	Dezhou city	10,356.32	5,611,194	Decheng District	2	7	2
371500	Liaocheng city	8,714.57	5,952,128	Dongchangfu District	2	5	1
371600	Binzhou city	9,444.65	3,928,568	Bincheng District	2	4	1
371700	Heze city	12,193.85	8,795,939	Mudan District	2	7	
Sub-provincial cities

Administrative divisions in Chinese and varieties of romanizations
English	Chinese	Pinyin
Shandong Province	山东省	Shāndōng Shěng
Jinan city	济南市	Jǐnán Shì
Qingdao city	青岛市	Qīngdǎo Shì
Zibo city	淄博市	Zībó Shì
Zaozhuang city	枣庄市	Zǎozhuāng Shì
Dongying city	东营市	Dōngyíng Shì
Yantai city	烟台市	Yāntái Shì
Weifang city	潍坊市	Wéifāng Shì
Jining city	济宁市	Jǐníng Shì
Tai'an city	泰安市	Tài'ān Shì
Weihai city	威海市	Wēihǎi Shì
Rizhao city	日照市	Rìzhào Shì
Linyi city	临沂市	Línyí Shì
Dezhou city	德州市	Dézhōu Shì
Liaocheng city	聊城市	Liáochéng Shì
Binzhou city	滨州市	Bīnzhōu Shì
Heze city	菏泽市	Hézé Shì

The 16 prefecture-level cities of Shandong are subdivided into 137 county-level divisions (55 districts, 26 county-level cities, and 56 counties). Those are in turn divided into 1941 township-level divisions (1223 towns, 293 townships, two ethnic townships, and 423 subdistricts).

=== Urban areas ===
As of 2023, the province's urbanization rate reached approximately 64.2% (with 65.55 million people reside in cities), slightly below the national average but showing consistent growth. Shandong features a comprehensive multi-centered urban system with 16 prefecture-level cities, including Jinan, the provincial capital and a key administrative and transportation hub, and Qingdao, a major coastal city with a strong port economy and international presence. The province has made notable progress in narrowing the urban-rural divide through policies promoting integrated development, rural infrastructure extension, and the growth of small towns and county-level cities.

Population by urban areas of prefecture & county cities
#	City	Urban area	District area	City total	Census date
1	Jinan (Note: Laiwu PLC is currently no longer exist after census it merged with Jinan in 2019. Laiwu PLC's districts merged after census: Laiwu (Laicheng), Gangcheng; and new districts established after census: Zhangqiu (Zhangqiu CLC), Jiyang (Jiyang County). Laiwu PLC's districts and the new districts not included in the urban area & district area count of the pre-expanded city.)	3,527,566	4,335,989	8,396,142	2010-11-01
(1)	Jinan (new districts)	1,261,040	2,880,687	see Jinan	2010-11-01
2	Qingdao (Note: New district established after census: Jimo (Jimo CLC); Jiaonan CLC merged into Xihai'an (Huangdao) after census. The new district and annexed area not included in the urban area & district area count of the pre-expanded city.)	3,519,919	3,718,835	8,715,087	2010-11-01
(2)	Qingdao (new district)	1,036,158	2,045,549	see Qingdao	2010-11-01
3	Zibo	2,261,717	3,129,228	4,530,597	2010-11-01
4	Yantai	1,797,861	2,227,733	6,968,202	2010-11-01
5	Linyi	1,522,488	2,303,648	10,039,440	2010-11-01
6	Weifang	1,261,582	2,044,028	9,086,241	2010-11-01
7	Tai'an	1,123,541	1,735,425	5,494,207	2010-11-01
8	Zaozhuang	980,893	2,125,481	3,729,140	2010-11-01
9	Jining (Note: New district established after census: Yanzhou (Yanzhou CLC). The new district not included in the urban area & district area count of the pre-expanded city.)	939,034	1,241,012	8,081,905	2010-11-01
(9)	Jining (new district)	388,449	618,394	see Jining	2010-11-01
10	Rizhao	902,272	1,320,578	2,801,013	2010-11-01
11	Dongying (Note: New district established after census: Kenli (Kenli County). The new district not included in the urban area & district area count of the pre-expanded city.)	848,958	1,004,271	2,035,338	2010-11-01
(11)	Dongying (new district)	114,073	242,292	see Dongying	2010-11-01
12	Tengzhou	783,473	1,603,659	see Zaozhuang	2010-11-01
13	Weihai (Note: New district established after census: Wendeng (Wendeng CLC). The new district not included in the urban area & district area count of the pre-expanded city.)	698,863	844,310	2,804,771	2010-11-01
(13)	Weihai (new district)	310,628	673,625	see Weihai	2010-11-01
14	Xintai	672,207	1,315,942	see Tai'an	2010-11-01
15	Liaocheng	606,366	1,229,768	5,789,863	2010-11-01
16	Zhucheng	586,652	1,086,222	see Weifang	2010-11-01
17	Heze (Note: New district established after census: Dingtao (Dingtao County). The new district not included in the urban area & district area count of the pre-expanded city.)	559,636	1,346,717	8,287,693	2010-11-01
(17)	Heze (new district)	166,037	565,793	see Heze	2010-11-01
18	Dezhou (Note: New district established after census: Lingcheng (Lingxian County). The new district not included in the urban area & district area count of the pre-expanded city.)	526,232	679,535	5,568,235	2010-11-01
(18)	Dezhou (new district)	170,317	569,007	see Dezhou	2010-11-01
19	Zoucheng	513,418	1,116,692	see Jining	2010-11-01
20	Shouguang	476,274	1,139,454	see Weifang	2010-11-01
21	Feicheng	472,775	946,627	see Tai'an	2010-11-01
22	Gaomi	466,786	895,582	see Weifang	2010-11-01
23	Pingdu	427,694	868,348	see Qingdao	2010-11-01
24	Binzhou (Note: New district established after census: Zhanhua (Zhanhua County). The new district not included in the urban area & district area count of the pre-expanded city.)	407,820	682,717	3,748,474	2010-11-01
(24)	Binzhou (new district)	146,577	351,672	see Binzhou	2010-11-01
25	Jiaozhou	404,216	1357,424	see Qingdao	2010-11-01
(26)	Zouping (Note: Zouping County is currently known as Zouping CLC after census.)	389,003	778,777	see Binzhou	2010-11-01
27	Longkou	388,770	688,255	see Yantai	2010-11-01
28	Qingzhou	384,358	940,355	see Weifang	2010-11-01
29	Laizhou	379,789	883,896	see Yantai	2010-11-01
30	Linqing	376,337	719,611	see Liaocheng	2010-11-01
31	Rongcheng	363,420	714,355	see Weihai	2010-11-01
32	Laiyang	358,092	878,591	see Yantai	2010-11-01
33	Laixi	347,452	750,225	see Qingdao	2010-11-01
34	Qufu	302,805	640,498	see Jining	2010-11-01
35	Anqiu	300,160	926,894	see Weifang	2010-11-01
36	Changyi	287,720	603,482	see Weifang	2010-11-01
37	Zhaoyuan	281,780	566,244	see Yantai	2010-11-01
38	Rushan	259,876	572,481	see Weihai	2010-11-01
39	Haiyang	244,600	638,729	see Yantai	2010-11-01
40	Leling	214,238	652,415	see Dezhou	2010-11-01
41	Qixia	204,633	589,620	see Yantai	2010-11-01
42	Yucheng	203,724	490,031	see Dezhou	2010-11-01
43	Penglai	185,894	451,109	see Yantai	2010-11-01

Most populous cities in Shandong Source: China Urban Construction Statistical Yearbook 2018 Urban Population and Urban Temporary Population
Rank		Pop.	Rank		Pop.
1	Qingdao	5,127,000	11	Weihai	968,500
2	Jinan	4,154,900	12	Heze	917,900
3	Linyi	2,188,300	13	Dongying	911,900
4	Yantai	2,186,100	14	Liaocheng	910,600
5	Zibo	1,824,600	15	Rizhao	900,000
6	Jining	1,577,400	16	Binzhou	887,600
7	Weifang	1,497,600	17	Laiwu	720,000
8	Dezhou	1,074,200	18	Shouguang	574,900
9	Tai'an	1,027,100	19	Xintai	555,000
10	Zaozhuang	1,025,800	20	Zhucheng	496,900

== Culture ==
=== Dialects ===
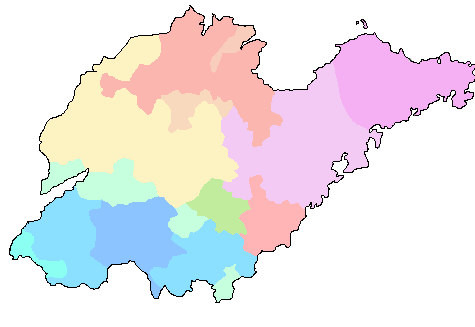
Dialect divisions of Shandong according to the Language Atlas of China Jiaoliao Mandarin – Denglian Cluster (Dengzhou, Dalian) Jiaoliao Mandarin – Qingzhou Cluster (Qingzhou) Jilu Mandarin (influenced by Jiaoliao Mandarin) Jilu Mandarin – Zhangli Cluster (Zhangqiu, Lijin) Jilu Mandarin Jilu Mandarin (influenced by Zhongyuan Mandarin) Zhongyuan Mandarin (influenced by Jilu Mandarin) Zhongyuan Mandarin – Luoxu Cluster (Luoyang, Xuzhou) Zhongyuan Mandarin – Zhengcao Cluster (Zhengzhou, Caozhou) Zhongyuan Mandarin – Cailu Cluster (Xincai, Qufu)

Mandarin dialects are spoken in Shandong. Linguists classify these dialects into three broad categories: Ji Lu Mandarin spoken in the northwest (as well as in neighboring Hebei), such as the Jinan dialect; Zhongyuan Mandarin spoken in the southwest (as well as in neighboring Henan); and Jiao Liao Mandarin spoken in the Shandong Peninsula (as well as the Liaodong Peninsula (e.g., Dalian, Dandong) and the southeastern Jilin (e.g., Baishan, Tonghua)), such as the Weihai Dialect. When people speak of the "Shandong dialect" (山東話), it is generally the first or the second that is meant; the Jiao Liao dialects of Shandong are commonly called the "Jiaodong dialect" (膠東話).

=== Cuisine ===
Shandong cuisine (鲁菜) is one of the eight great traditions of Chinese cuisine. It is known for its bread (corn-based) and fish dishes and characterized by its emphasis on fresh seafood, hearty soups, and bold, savory flavors achieved through techniques like braising and roasting, with a focus on preserving the natural taste of ingredients. It can be further divided into three branches: inland branch (e.g. Jinan cuisine (济南菜)), the seafood-oriented Jiaodong branch (e.g. Fushan cuisine (福山菜)) in the peninsula, and Confucius's Family branch (孔府菜), with an elaborate tradition originally intended for imperial and other important feasts.

Shandong cuisine significantly influenced Beijing cuisine due to historical migration and political factors, especially during the Ming and Qing dynasties when imperial chefs and officials in the capital mostly came from Shandong. This influence is evident in Beijing cuisine's emphasis on hearty flavors, wheat-based staples, and cooking techniques such as braising, roasting, and deep-frying.

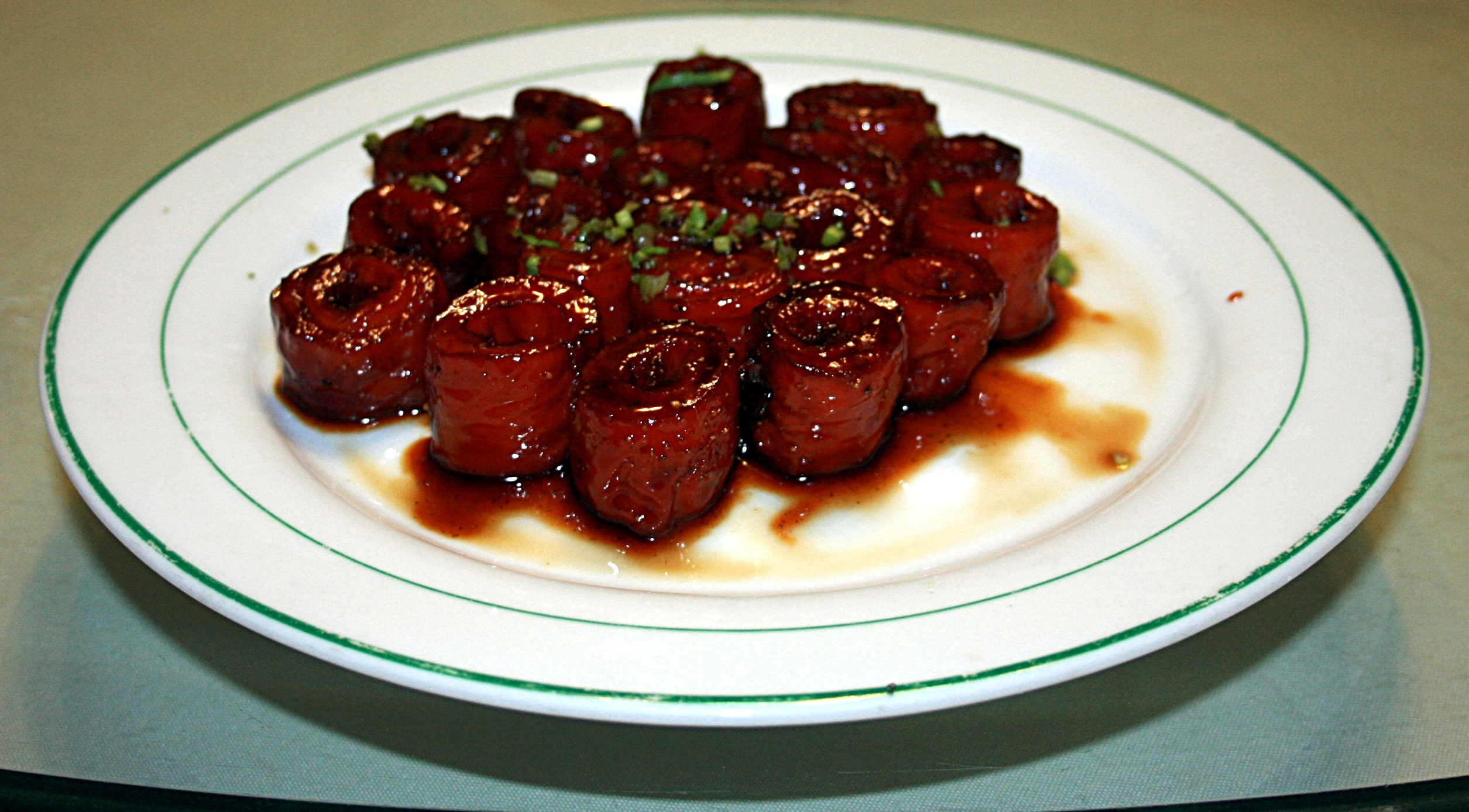
Braised intestines in brown sauce

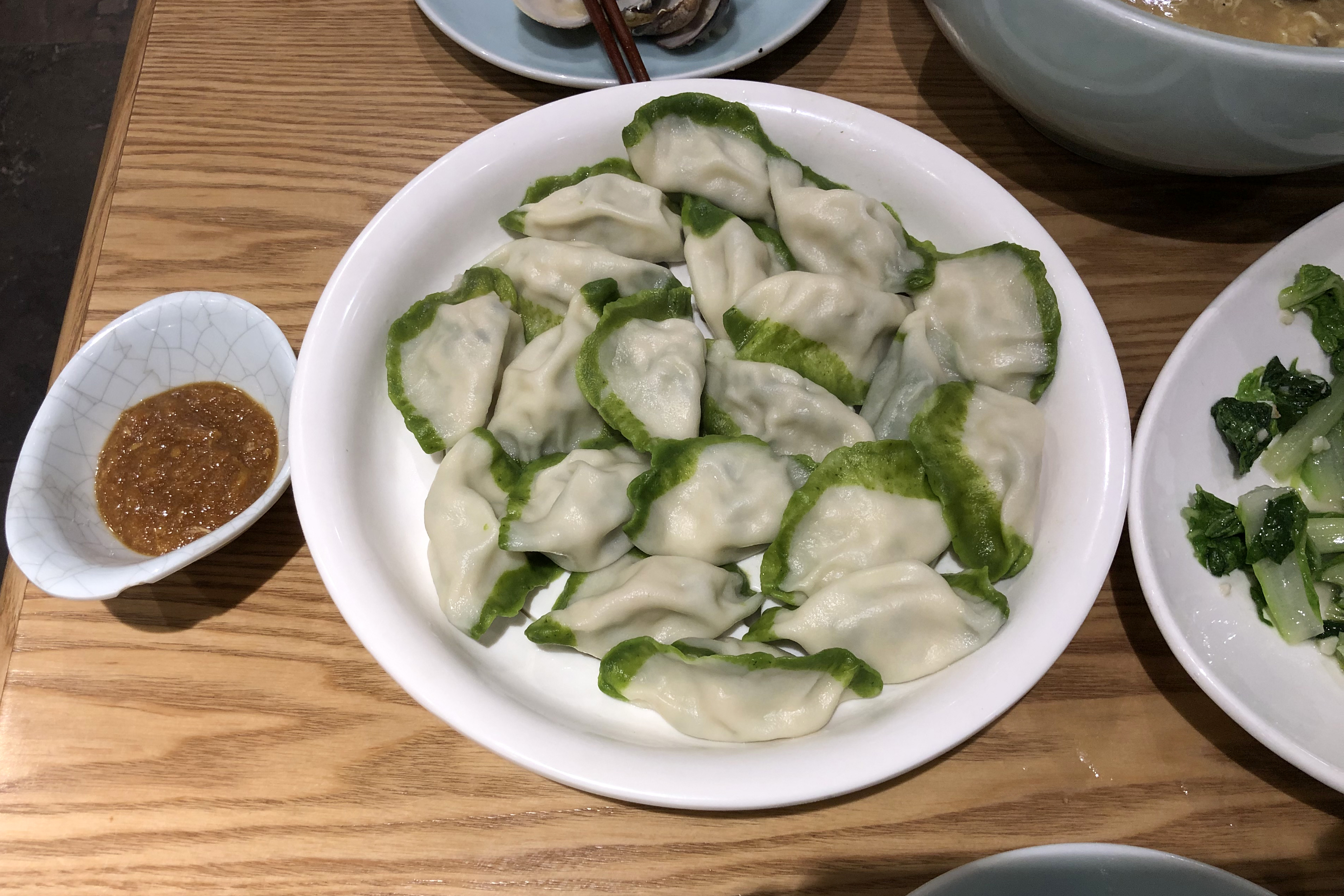
Seafood dumplings

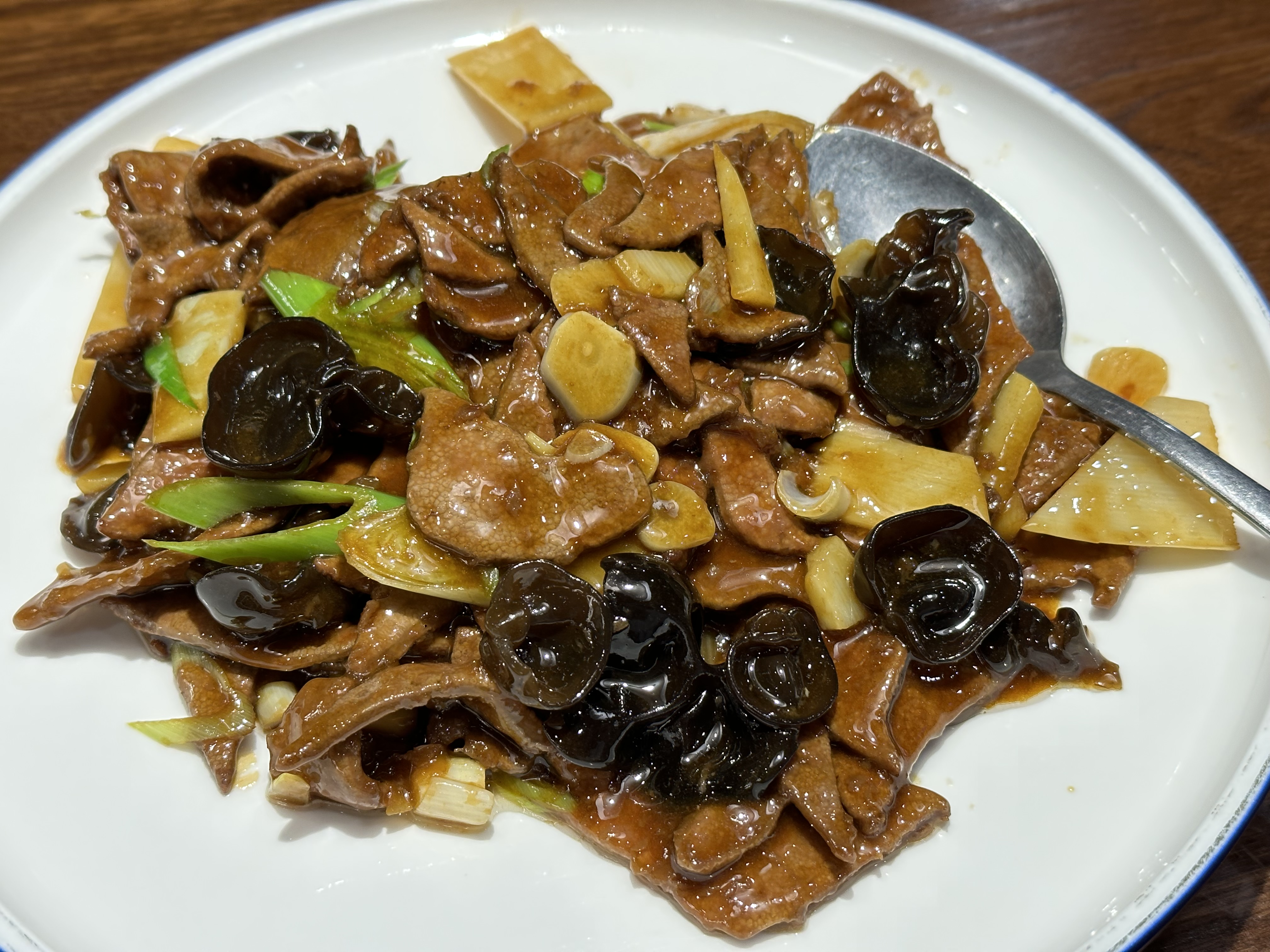
Wok-fried pork liver

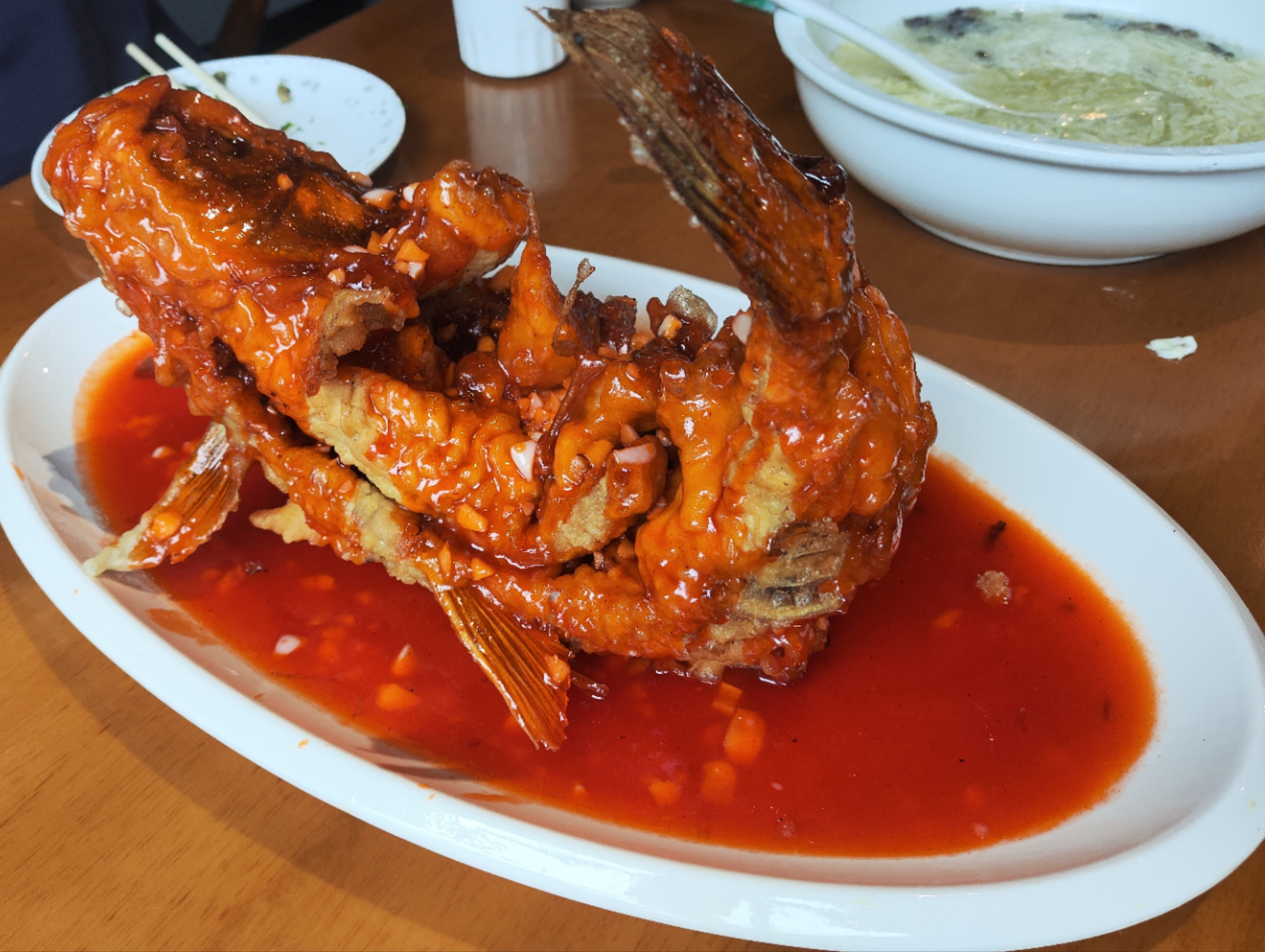
Yellow River sweet and sour fish

=== Literature and arts ===
Ci of Shuyü by Li Qingzhao, who is an outstanding female poet from Zhangqiu in the 12th century

The literature of Shandong largely reflects Confucianism; Confucius proposed the poetic theory of "evocation, observation, socialization, and admonition" (興, 觀, 群, 怨), which laid the foundation for traditional Chinese poetic theory. Since the Qin and Han dynasties, notable literary figures from Shandong include Kong Rong and Wang Can of the Jian'an period, Zuo Si of the Western Jin, Wang Xizhi of the Eastern Jin, Bao Zhao and He Xun of the Southern Dynasties, Yan Zhitui of the Northern Qi, Duan Chengshi from the Tang to Five Dynasties period, Chao Buzhi, Li Qingzhao, and Xin Qiji of the Song and Yuan periods, Li Kaixian, Li Panlong, and Kong Shangren of the Ming and Qing dynasties, as well as novelists like Luo Guanzhong and Pu Songling. Classic works from Shandong include the Book of Songs, Spring and Autumn Annals, Discourses of the States, Zuo Zhuan, Analects, and Mencius.

Representative works of Shandong folk songs (a branch of Chinese folk music) include the Han dynasty's Liangfuyin (梁父吟), the Qing dynasty collection Baixue Yiyin (白雪遗音, lit "Echoes of Snow and Sorrow"), and the modern folk song Yimeng Mountain Minor (沂蒙山小调). Local folk performance forms include Shandong Bangzi, Shandong Kuaishu, and Lü opera, while Shandong Drum Song (山東大鼓) was listed in the first batch of National Intangible Cultural Heritage of China. Famous Shandong operatic works include The Precious Sword (寶劍記) by Li Kaixian and The Peach Blossom Fan by Kong Shangren. Shandong Bangzi and Lüju are popular types of Chinese opera in Shandong; both originated from southwestern Shandong.

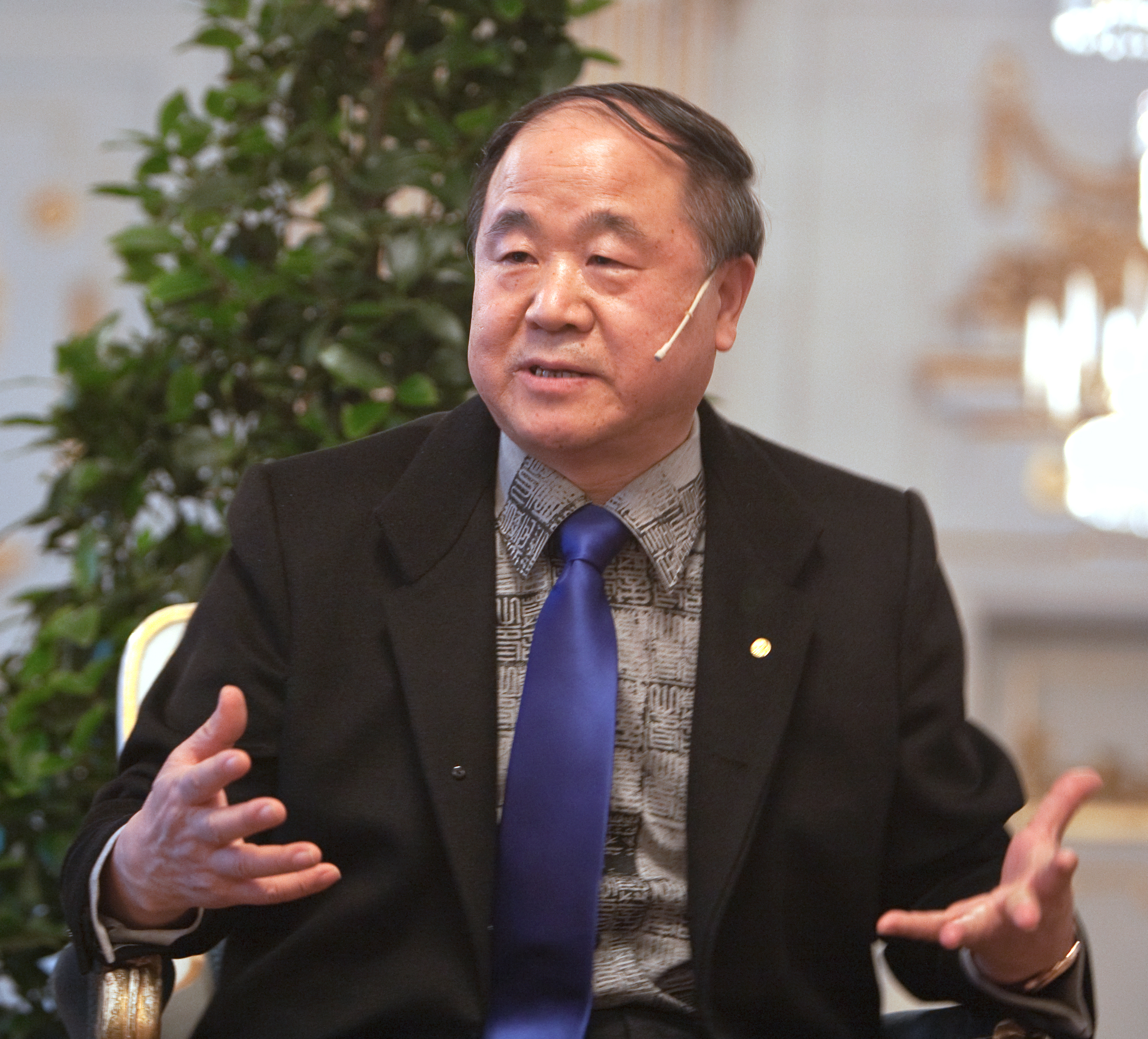
The first Nobel laureate in Literature with Chinese nationality, Mo Yan, hailed from Gaomi, Shandong, which served as the fictional backdrop for much of his literary work

Notable contemporary Shandong cultural and performing figures include singer Peng Liyuan (from Yuncheng), host Ni Ping (from Rongcheng), actress Gong Li (from Jinan), Huang Bo (from Qingdao), and writers Mo Yan (from Gaomi) and Zhang Wei (from Huang). Peng Liyuan was the first person in mainland China to earn a master's degree in ethnic vocal music and now serves as president of the PLA Academy of Art. Ni Ping hosted the CCTV Spring Festival Gala for 13 consecutive years. In 2000, she shifted her career to film and television and won the Golden Rooster Award for Best Actress for Pretty Big Feet. Gong Li has received the Best Actress Award at the 49th Venice International Film Festival, two Golden Rooster Awards for Best Actress, and the Hong Kong Film Award for Best Actress at the 26th edition, among other domestic and international honors. Huang Bo won the Golden Horse Award for Best Actor in 2009 and 2017 for Cow and The Conformist, respectively, and also won the Hong Kong Film Award for Best Actor in 2015 for Dearest. In 2016, he signed with Sony Music Entertainment as a musician. Mo Yan, a native from Gaomi, won the 2012 Nobel Prize in Literature for combining hallucinatory realism with folk tales, history, and contemporary society, becoming the first Chinese national to receive this honor.

=== Media ===
Radio and television broadcasting in Shandong is divided into over-the-air radio, cable radio, and television broadcasting, all of which are state-owned enterprises. In May 1933, the first wireless broadcasting station was established in Jinan and named the Shandong Provincial Capital Broadcasting Station. On 27 October 1950, the Shandong People's Radio Station officially began broadcasting to the entire province. By 1955, some counties and cities began to establish cable broadcasting stations. By the end of 1990, the province had 16 wireless radio stations and 34 television stations. As of the end of 2019, the comprehensive coverage rates of radio and television in Shandong were 99.13% and 99.10%, respectively. Among them, the Shandong Radio and Television Station has 21 channels, including 11 television channels such as Shandong Satellite TV and 10 radio channels. The Jinan Radio and Television Station currently has 8 television channels and 7 radio channels; the Qingdao Radio and Television Station has 7 television channels and 9 radio channels; and the Zibo Radio and Television Station has 5 television channels covering news, science education, public affairs, life, and urban topics, as well as 4 radio channels.

During the late Qing Dynasty, more than 20 newspapers were published successively in Shandong, including Jinan Bulletin (濟南匯報) founded in 1903 by Governor of Shandong Zhou Fu, and later publications such as Jinan Daily (濟南日報), and Shandong Official Gazette (山東官報).

At the beginning of the Cultural Revolution, only Dazhong Daily and seven regional and municipal newspapers remained in circulation.

Following the Reform and opening-up, the newspaper industry in Shandong resumed growth. By the end of 1990, the number of officially registered and approved newspapers in the province had reached 119. Today, some of the most well-known newspapers in Shandong include Qilu Evening News, Jinan Times and Shandong Business Daily.

== Transport ==
=== Rail ===
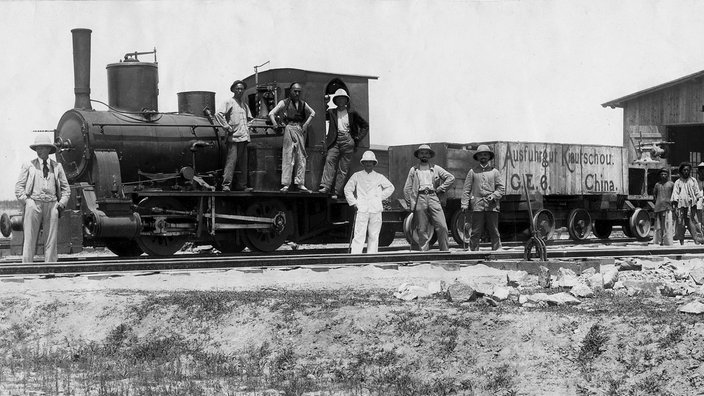
German engineers posed before a locomotive on the newly completed Qingdao–Jinan railway, which opened Shandong's interior to large-scale trade and resource extraction, connecting the port of Qingdao with the provincial capital Jinan and laying the groundwork for the region's rapid urban and industrial transformation

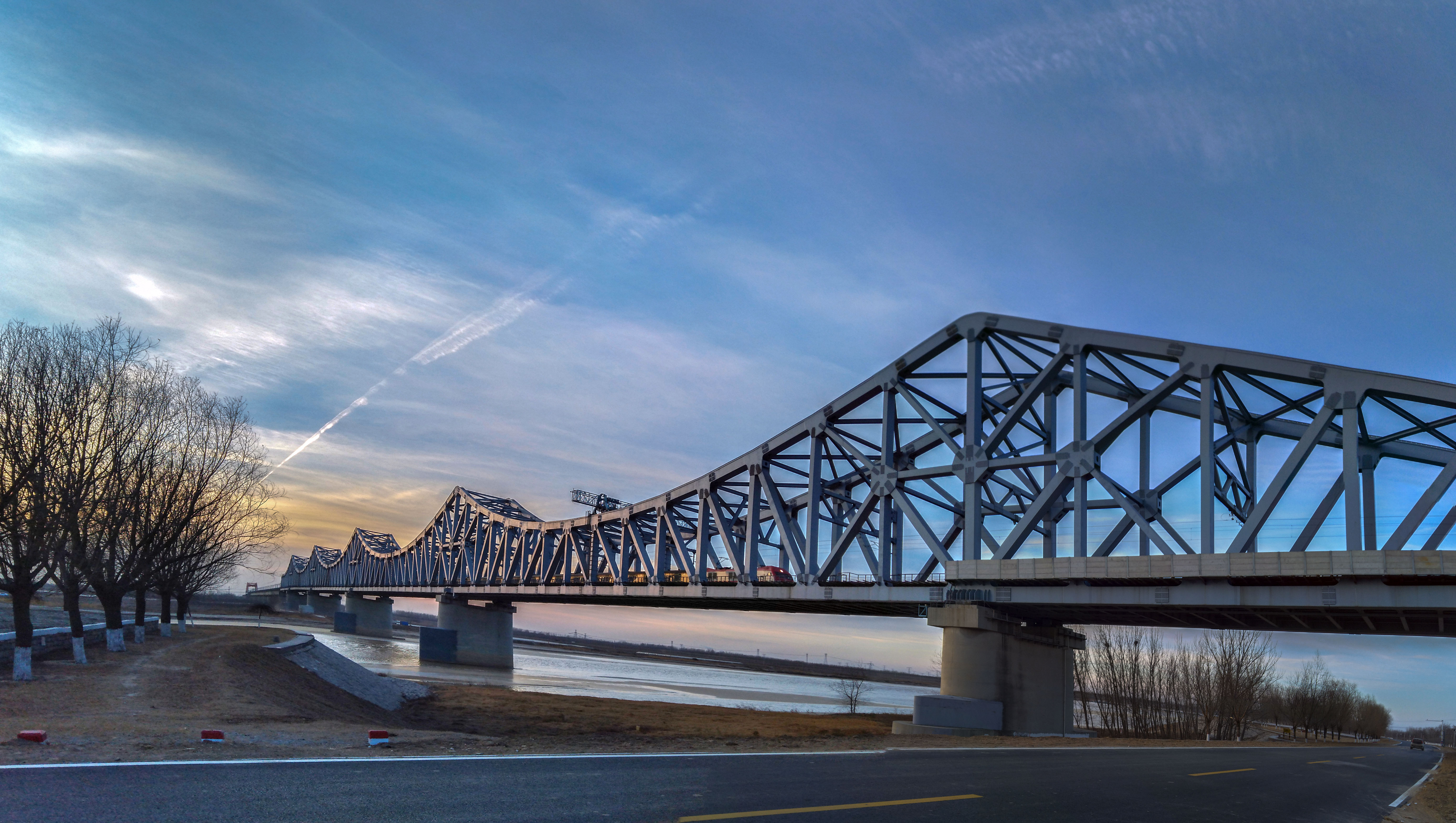
Train No. K1531 passes Longju Bridge over Yellow River near Lijin

The history of railway in Shandong can be traced back to Jiaozhou–Jinan Railway, which was constructed by Germans between 1899 and 1904 through the Shantung Railway Company (German: Schantung Eisenbahn Gesellschaft). The railroad was backed by German capital and operated under German management; they also built braches linking industrial towns such as Boshan and Fangzi. The line stretched approximately 393 kilometers, connecting Jinan, the provincial capital located in the northwestern interior of Shandong, with the German-controlled port of Qingdao. This railway is still the most important east–west main line across Shandong Province.

As for north–south traffics, Jingjiu railway (Beijing-Kowloon) and Jinghu railway (Beijing-Shanghai) are two major arterial railways that pass through the western part of Shandong. The Jingjiu passes through Liaocheng and Heze; the Jinghu passes through Dezhou, Jinan, Tai'an, Yanzhou (the Jinghu high-speed railway will through Qufu) and Zaozhuang.

The first high-speed railroad, Qingdao–Jinan passenger railway, operated in 2008, with maximum speed of 250 km. In the subsequent years, high-speed lines such as Beijing–Shanghai, Qingdao-Rongcheng, Shijiazhuang–Jinan and Zhengzhou–Jinan were all completed and commenced operation.

Jinan West Railway Station is the largest railway hub in Shandong Province, serving as the intersection point of the Jinan hub (comprising the Beijing–Shanghai railway, Jiaoji railway, and Handan–Jinan railway lines). Other major railway hubs include: the Qingdao railway station (connecting the Jiaoji, Jiaoxin, Jiaohuang, and Lanyan railways), the Dezhou hub (connecting the Beijing–Shanghai and Shide railways, under the administration of the Beijing Railway Bureau), the Yanzhou hub (Beijing–Shanghai, Xinyan, and Yanshi railways), and the Heze hub (Beijing–Kowloon and Xinyan railways).

According to the classification of the Ministry of Railways of the People's Republic of China, Shandong currently has four top-tier (special-class) railway stations:

- Jinan Railway Station (passenger and freight)
- Jinxi Railway Station (济西站, one of the nation's top ten network-level freight marshalling yards)
- Jinan West Railway Station (passenger station on the Beijing–Shanghai High-Speed Railway)
- Qingdao Railway Station (passenger station)

The Jinan East Railway Station is the largest railway station in Shandong. The Jinan Railway Bureau, following its 2008 reorganization, manages the majority of Shandong's trunk and branch railway networks, as well as the Bohai Train Ferry.

As of the end of 2024, Qingdao and Jinan are the only two cities in Shandong with a metro system.

=== Road ===
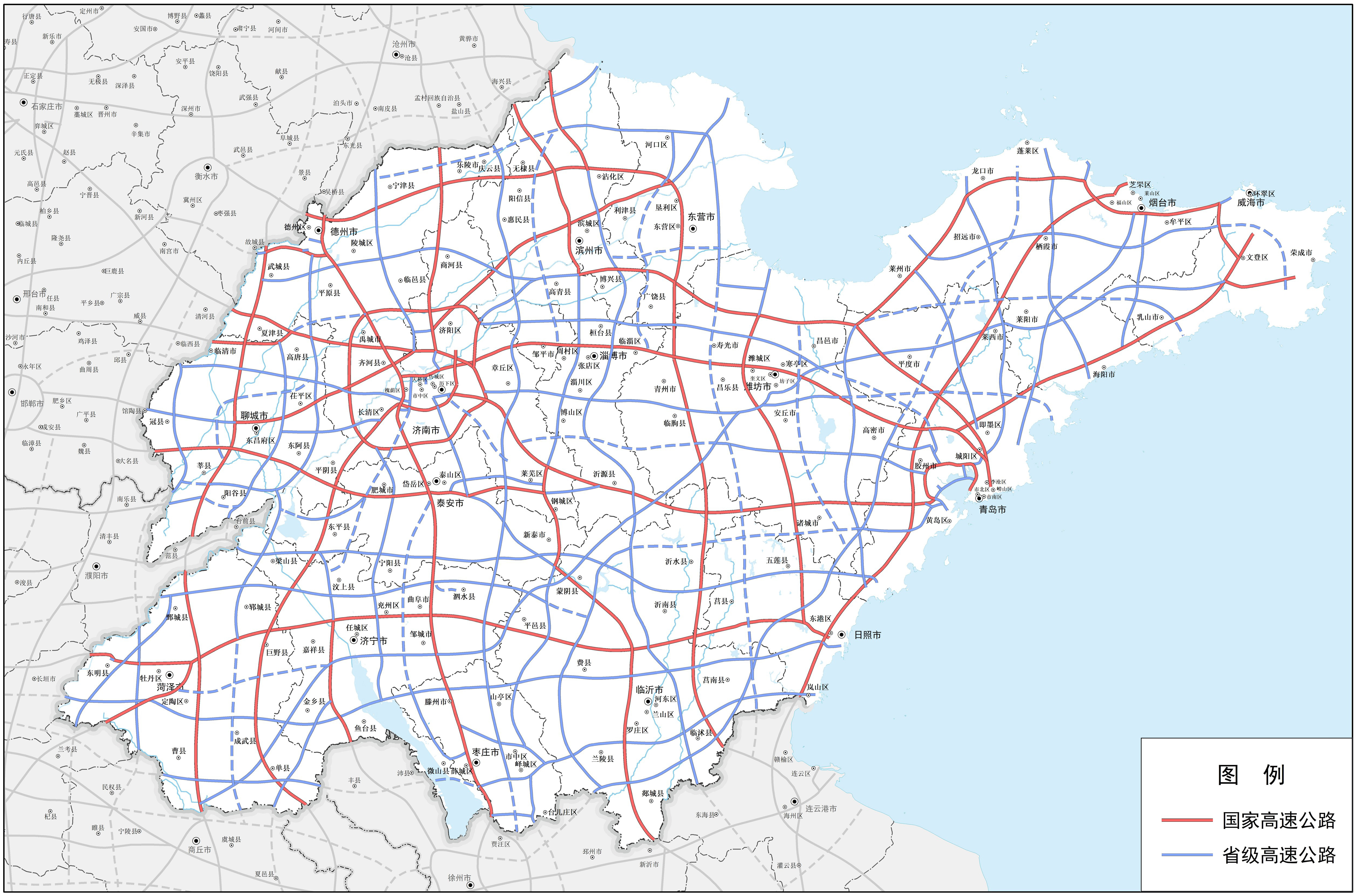
Shandong Expressway Network in 2023

Shandong has one of the densest and highest quality expressway networks among all Chinese provinces. These National Trunk Highway System (NTHS) expressways pass through or begin in Shandong. Expressways that begin in Shandong are in bold:

- G2 Jinghu Expressway (Beijing–Shanghai)
- G3 Jingtai Expressway (Beijing–Taipei, Taiwan)
- G15 Shenhai Expressway (Shenyang, Liaoning–Haikou, Hainan)
- **G18 Rongwu Expressway** (Rongcheng–Wuhai, Inner Mongolia)
- **G20 Qingyin Expressway** (Qingdao–Yinchuan, Ningxia)
- **G22 Qinglan Expressway** (Qingdao–Lanzhou, Gansu)
- G25 Changshen Expressway (Changchun, Jilin–Shenzhen, Guangdong)

There are also many shorter regional expressways within Shandong.

=== Sea ===
The Shandong Peninsula, with its bays and harbours, has many important ports, including Qingdao, Yantai, Weihai, Rizhao, Dongying and Longkou. Many of these ports have historical significance and the sites of former foreign naval bases or historical battles, such as Jin–Song wars, war of Ming and Manchus, First Sino-Japanese War and the Chinese Civil War.

Ferries link the cities on the north coast of the Shandong with Changshan Islands and Liaodong Peninsula. Eastward, Weidong Ferry links Shandong with Incheon, Republic of Korea, personnels and vehicles can be transported to South Korea and even Japan via this way.

=== Air ===
Major civil airports in Shandong

By 2014, civil aviation in Shandong Province had formed a preliminary structure featuring two trunk airports, Jinan and Qingdao, alongside six regional airports: Yantai, Jining, Linyi, Weihai, Dongying, and Weifang.

Additionally, Penglai Shahekou Airport, which was completed and opened to air traffic in 2002, is primarily used for test flights, training, and tourism. Rizhao Shanzihe Airport opened on 22 December 2015, and Qingdao Jiaodong International Airport officially commenced operations on 12 August 2021.

In 2014, Shandong's total annual passenger throughput exceeded 30 million for the first time, with total cargo and mail volume reaching 350,000 tons. Among them, Qingdao Liuting International Airport alone handled over 10 million passengers.

Direct flights between Shandong and Taiwan were launched in 2008. There are currently four cities with cross-strait direct flights: Jinan, Qingdao, Yantai, and Weihai, operating 10 routes with 52 round-trip flights per week, carrying over 1,000 passengers daily.

Shandong Airlines was founded in 1994 and currently operates more than 220 routes, with over 700 flights per week serving more than 40 major and medium-sized cities across China. As of March 2018, the airline had a fleet of 114 Boeing 737 series aircraft, with an average age of 5.0 years.

== Tourism ==
Tourist attractions in Shandong include:

Peninsula

- Qingdao, a beach resort city on the south of the peninsula with German-era heritage architecture and is also famous for its Tsingtao brewery.
  - Ba Da Guan, made up of eight streets named after the eight great military forts of ancient times.
  - Zhan Qiao, a long strip pier stretches into the sea and was the first wharf at Qingdao.
  - Mount Lao, a scenic area and Daoist center to the east of Qingdao.
- Weihai, a former military port played an important in the First Sino-Japanese War. As a British colony, it also has British-era heritage architectures.
- Yantai, a port city on the northeast of Shandong
  - Penglai Pavilion, a site heavily associated with Taoism culture, such as Xu Fu, Eight Immortals and Qiu Chuji.
  - Changdao Islands, a series of islands stretching from south to north on the mouth of Bohai Bay.
- Rizhao, a port city with a fancy coastline and beaches.

Heartland

- Jinan, the capital city of Shandong since Ming dynasty, renowned for its 72 Famous Springs.
  - Baotu Spring, a culturally significant artesian karst spring, declared as "Number One Spring under the Heaven" (天下第一泉) by the Qianlong Emperor of the Qing dynasty.
  - Daming Lake, the largest lake in Jinan, whose water is from the area's springs. Marco Polo described its beauty in his works.
  - Thousand Buddha Mountain, renowned for its numerous Buddha images which have been carved out of the hill's rock faces or free-standing structures erect since the times of the Sui dynasty and its Xingguochan Temple.
  - Fuxue Confucian Temple of Jinan.
  - Lingyan Temple, one of the four most famous temples (四大名刹) in Tang dynasty, in which there is 11th century Pizhi Pagoda and the Thousand Buddha Hall which houses a Ming dynasty bronze Buddha statue as well as 40 painted clay statues of life-size luohan from the Song dynasty.
  - remnant of Great Wall of Qi, the oldest existing Great Wall in China, which is built in 685 BCE and stretches from Jinan to Qingdao.
- Weifang, which has numerous natural and historic sites, such as Shihu Garden (from the Late Ming and early Qing dynasty), Fangong Pavilion (from the Song dynasty), fossil sites (including dinosaur fossils, in Shanwang, Linqu), Mount Yi National Forest Park and Mount Qingyun. Yangjiabu has painted New Year woodcuts, which are also famous all around China.
  - Qingzhou, former provincial capital, an ancient trading and administrative center with some famous archaeological discoveries.
- Dezhou, a city near the Beijing-Hangzhou Grand Canal.
  - Laoling, where the Laoling Film studio is the located in; it is largest film and television production base in Northern China.

Southwest

- Jining, rich of cultural and historical relics, especially for its association with Confucius and its location along the Grand Canal.
  - Qufu, former capital of Lu state, and the home of Confucius.
  - Zoucheng, home of Mencius; Prince of Lu of Ming Dynasty also resided here.
  - Weishan, where the Weishan Lake is located in.
  - Yanzhou, one of Nine Provinces, former administrative center.
- Zaozhuang, Taierzhuang old town is a famous scenic area.

UNESCO World Heritage Sites

- There are four places in Shandong listed on the UNESCO World Heritage Sites:
  - Temple and Cemetery of Confucius and the Kong is a very famous World Heritage Site in China, and it is also a 5A Tourist Attraction. Lying to the Temple's east, the Kong Family Mansion developed from a small family house linked to the temple into an aristocratic mansion. The male direct descendants of Confucius lived and worked.
  - Tai Shan, sacred mountain, in Tai'an
  - Grand Canal (part), runs through south to north in Western part of the province
  - Migratory Bird Sanctuaries along the Coast of Yellow Sea-Bohai Gulf of China in Dongying
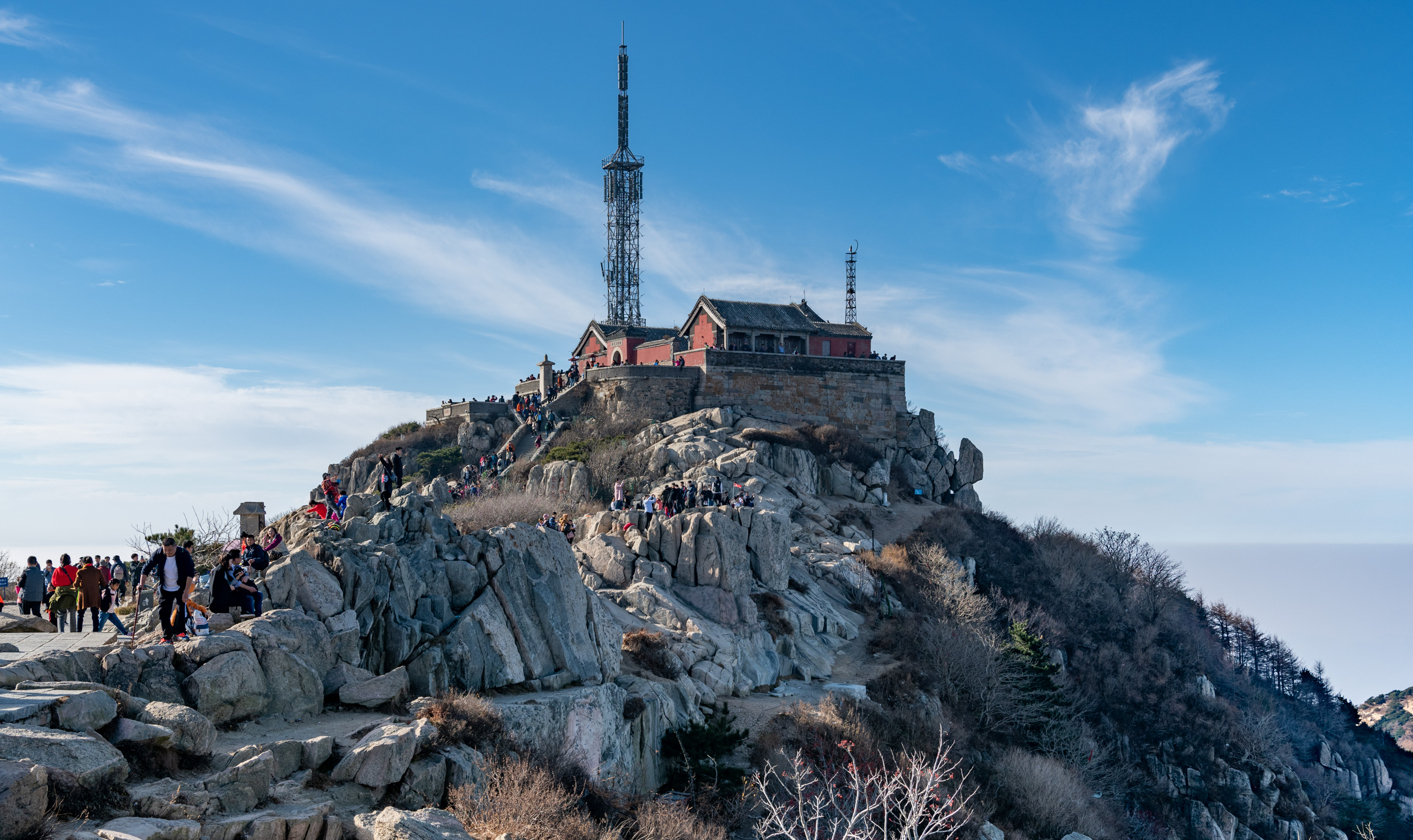
Jade Emperor Peak, Taian

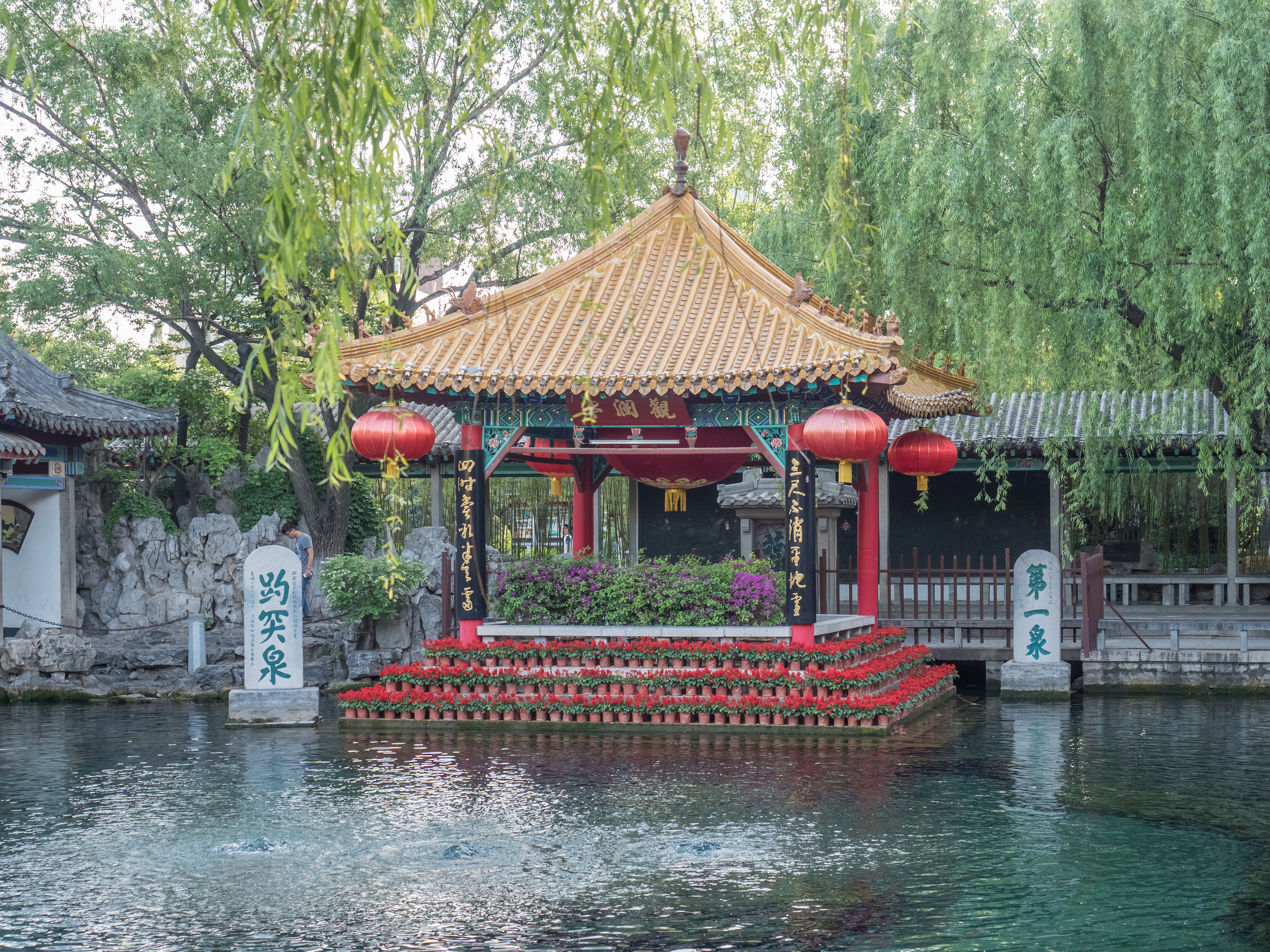
Baotu Spring, Jinan

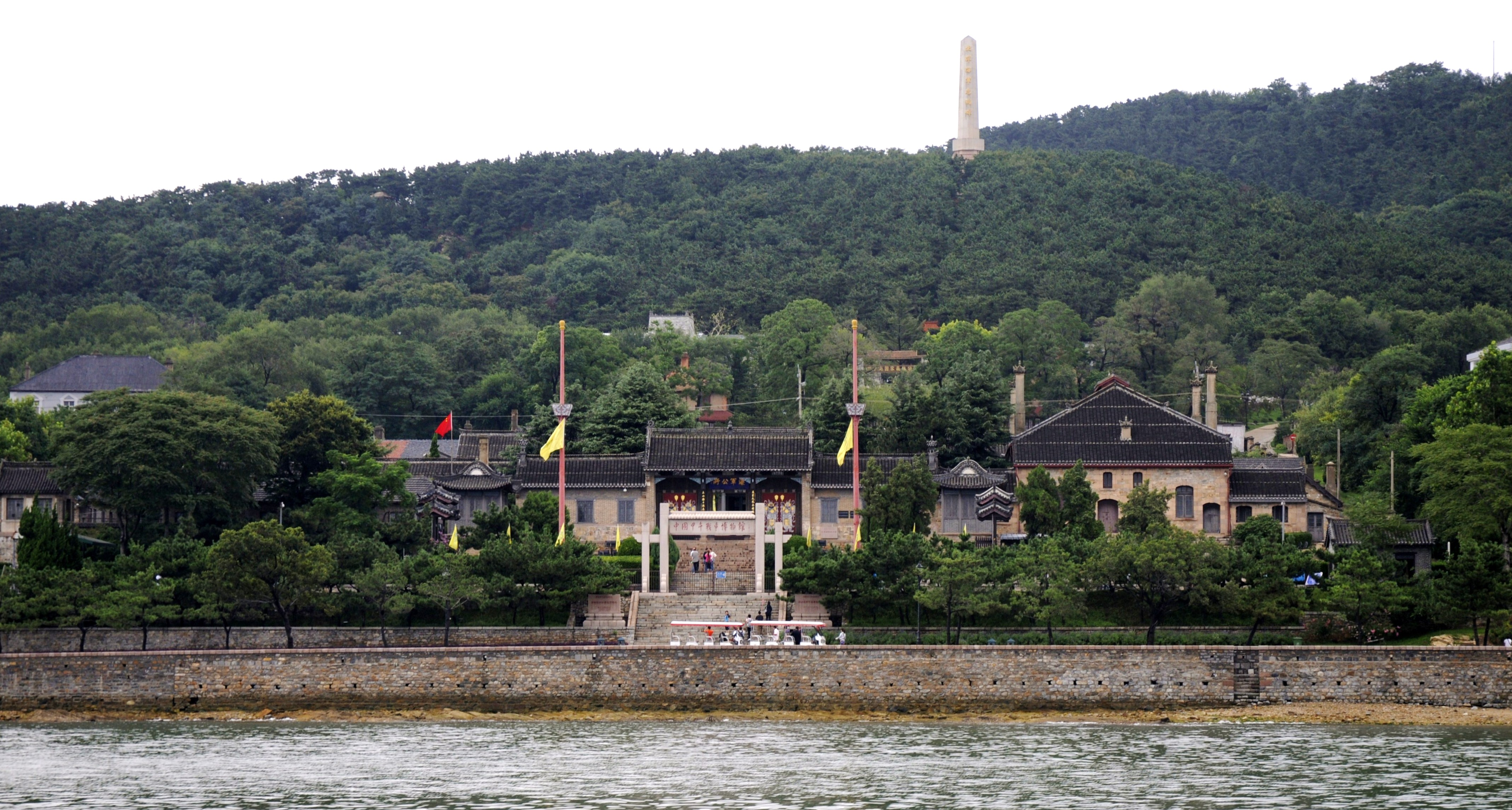
Liugong Island, Weihai

City Wall, Qufu

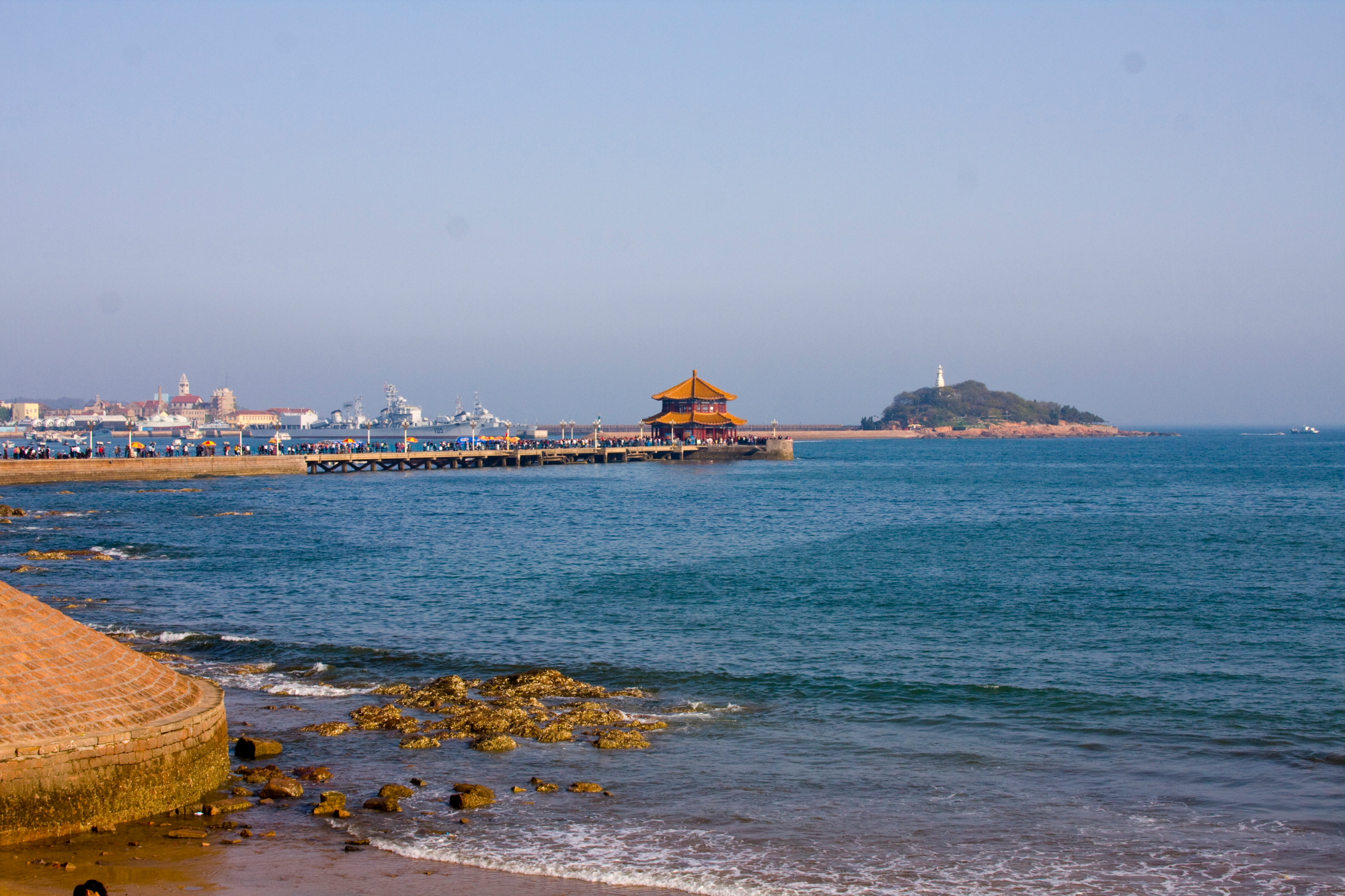
Zhanqiao Pier, Qingdao

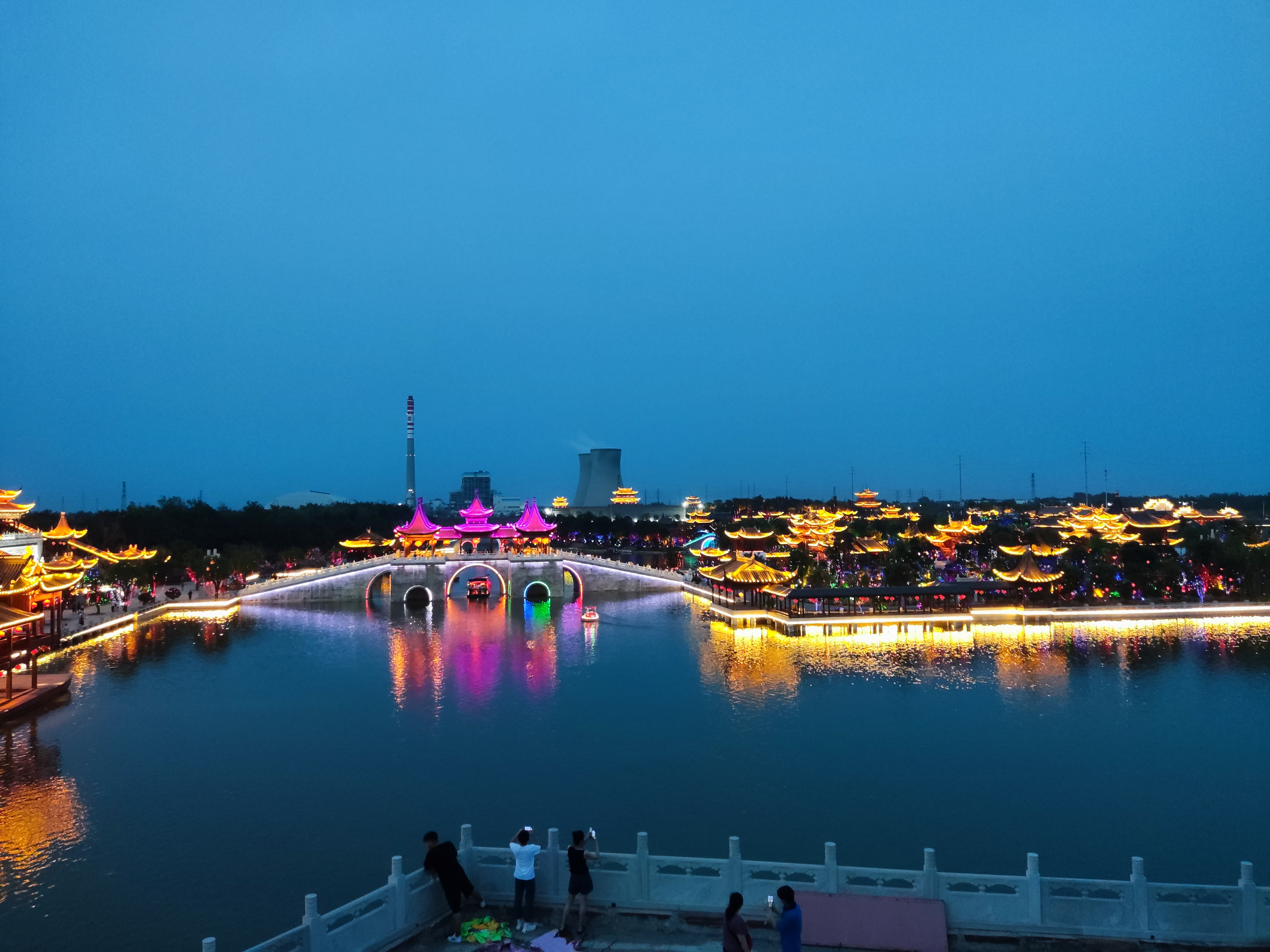
Grand Canal, Linqing

== Education ==
=== History of education ===
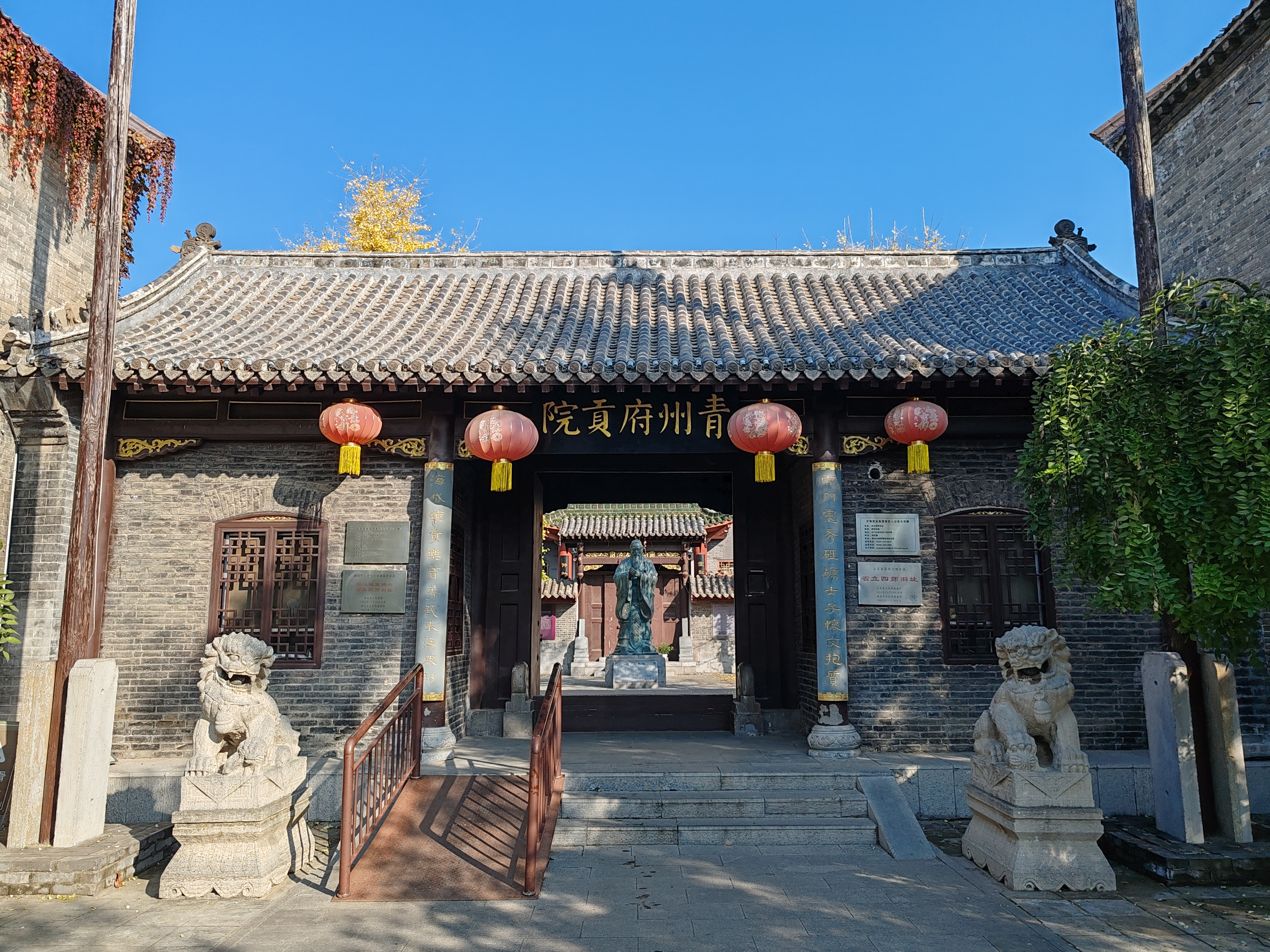
Traditional Confucius academy of Qingzhou Prefecture (青州府) in Qingzhou, Weifang

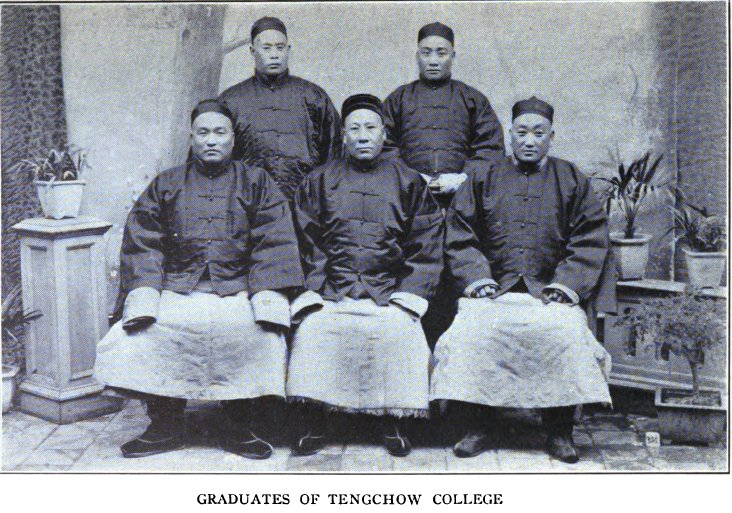
First cohort of graduates of Christian-led Tengchow College in Cheefoo, Yantai

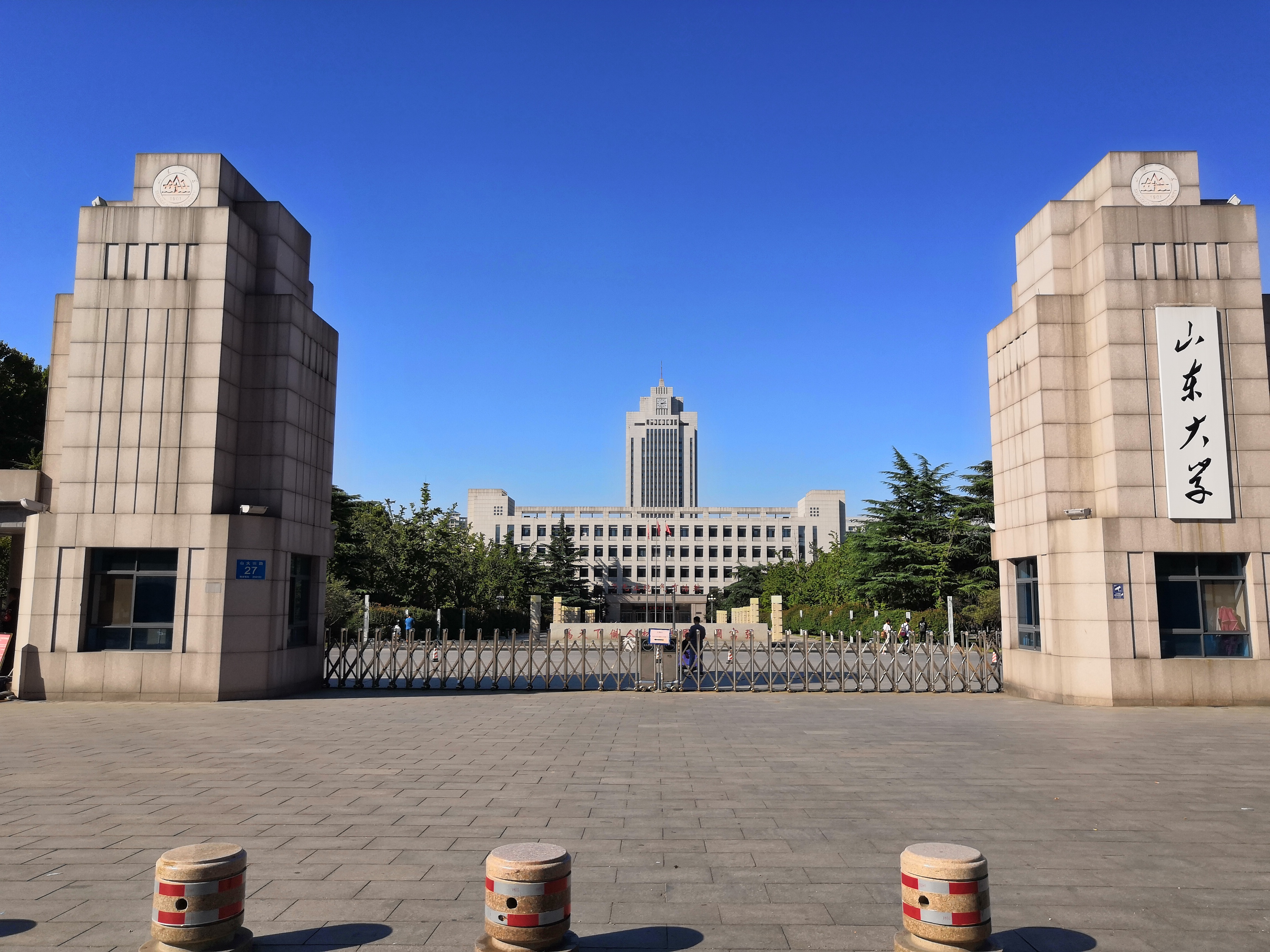
Shandong University, which is consistently considered the best university of the province, in Licheng, Jinan

Shandong is considered one of China's leading provinces in education and research. Shandong hosts 153 higher education institutions, ranking second in the East China region after Jiangsu and fourth among all Chinese provinces/municipalities after Jiangsu, Guangdong and Henan.

Before the late Qing dynasty, Shandong generally enjoyed a flourishing educational tradition, except during a few periods such as the Qin dynasty and the late Jin dynasty. During the Spring and Autumn period, Confucius pioneered private education. In the Northern Song dynasty, Shandong first introduced the "school field" system, which promoted institutional education. In the Ming and Qing periods, private schools, official schools, and academies of classical learning thrived. During the reign of Emperor Yongzheng in the Qing dynasty, there were 75 academies in Shandong, of which 61 were government-run. Following the Hundred Days' Reform, Shandong established the first provincial-level university in China.

During the late Qing period, Western missionary education had a significant influence on Shandong's educational development. For example, in 1866, Presbyterian missionary Calvin Wilson Mateer founded the Wenxian Primary School (for boys) and Huiying Primary School (for girls) in Yuhuangding, Yantai, which were the first modern schools established in Yantai following its opening as a treaty port under the Treaty of Tientsin in 1862. These schools later developed into the Yantai Yuwen Business College, the predecessor of today's Yantai No. 2 High School. Mateer's wife, Julia Mateer, also established the first kindergarten in Yantai at Yuhuangding. Calvin Mateer went on to establish over 40 primary schools in areas including Fushan, Muping, Qixia, Laiyang, Haiyang, Jimo, Jiaozhou, and urban Yantai. Fellow missionaries Hunter Corbett and his wife established the Tengchow College, the first modern higher education institution in China, which also became one of the earliest Christian colleges in the country.

After the Chinese Communist Party came to power, all institutions of higher education in the province ceased enrollment for five years starting in 1966 due to the Cultural Revolution, which severely disrupted educational order. Restoration did not begin until after 1976. As of 2016, the province had 18,853 kindergartens, 12,951 compulsory education schools (including 10,027 elementary schools and 2,924 junior high schools), 580 regular high schools, 428 secondary vocational schools, 146 special education schools, and 155 higher education institutions (144 regular universities and colleges and 11 adult education institutions). There were 25 nationally designated key technical schools, with a provincial enrollment of 148,000 students in technical schools, and a graduate employment rate of 98%. Among them, the Shandong Lanxiang Senior Technical School gained widespread attention after Western media reported its role in training technical non-commissioned officers for the People's Liberation Army.

=== Colleges and universities ===
As of 2016, Shandong had 141 officially accredited higher education institutions offering general degree programs, including 67 regular undergraduate institutions, 73 vocational colleges, and 1 branch campus. Among the regular undergraduate institutions, 44 were public, 12 were private, and 11 were independent colleges. Among the vocational colleges, 60 were public and 13 were private. Shandong is home to three universities included in the Double First-Class Construction, namely Shandong University (985), Ocean University of China (985), and China University of Petroleum (East China) (211). Additionally, three Double First-Class universities registered in other provinces have campuses in Shandong: Beijing Jiaotong University, Weihai (211), Harbin Institute of Technology, Weihai (985), and China Agricultural University, Yantai (985). Shandong ranks first in the nation in terms of marine science research capacity. As of the end of 2009, the province had nearly 60 national and provincial-level institutions engaged in marine science and education, 29 provincial and ministerial-level marine key laboratories, over 20 scientific research vessels, 10 national-level demonstration bases for marine science and technology, and more than half of China's marine science personnel—including 23 academicians of the Chinese Academy of Sciences and Chinese Academy of Engineering.

As of 2025, two major cities in the province ranked in the top 35 cities in the world (Jinan #27 and Qingdao #31) by scientific research output, as tracked by the Nature Index.

Jinan

- Shandong University
- University of Jinan
- Shandong University of Finance and Economics
- Shandong Normal University
- Shandong University of Traditional Chinese Medicine

Qingdao

- Ocean University of China
- China University of Petroleum
- Qingdao Agricultural University
- Qingdao University
- Qingdao University of Technology
- Shandong University of Science and Technology
- Qingdao Binhai University
- Qingdao Technical College

Yantai

- China Agricultural University
- Shandong Institute of Business and Technology
- Yantai University
- Ludong University

Weihai

- Harbin University of Science and Technology
- Harbin Institute of Technology
- Beijing Jiaotong University

Other cities

- Qufu Normal University (Qufu)
- Shandong Agricultural University (Tai'an)
- Weifang University (Weifang)
- Weifang Medical University (Weifang)
- Shandong University of Technology (Zibo)
- Zibo Vocational Institute (Zibo)
- Liaocheng University (Liaocheng)
- Linyi University (Linyi)
- Binzhou Medical College (Binzhou)
- Jining Medical University (Jining)
- Rizhao Polytechnic (Rizhao)
- Shandong Foreign Languages Vocational College (Rizhao)

== Sports ==
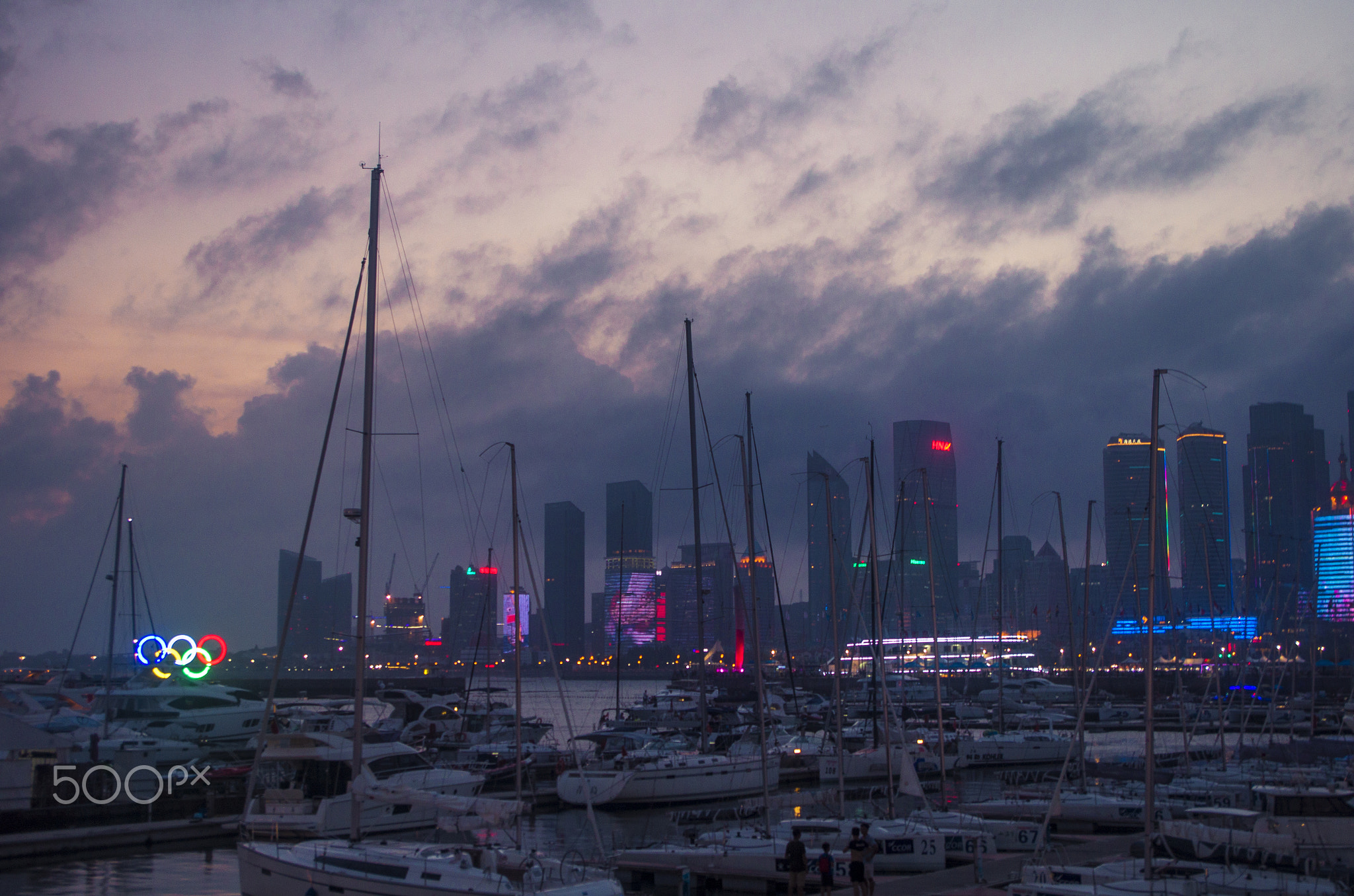
Qingdao International Sailing Centre

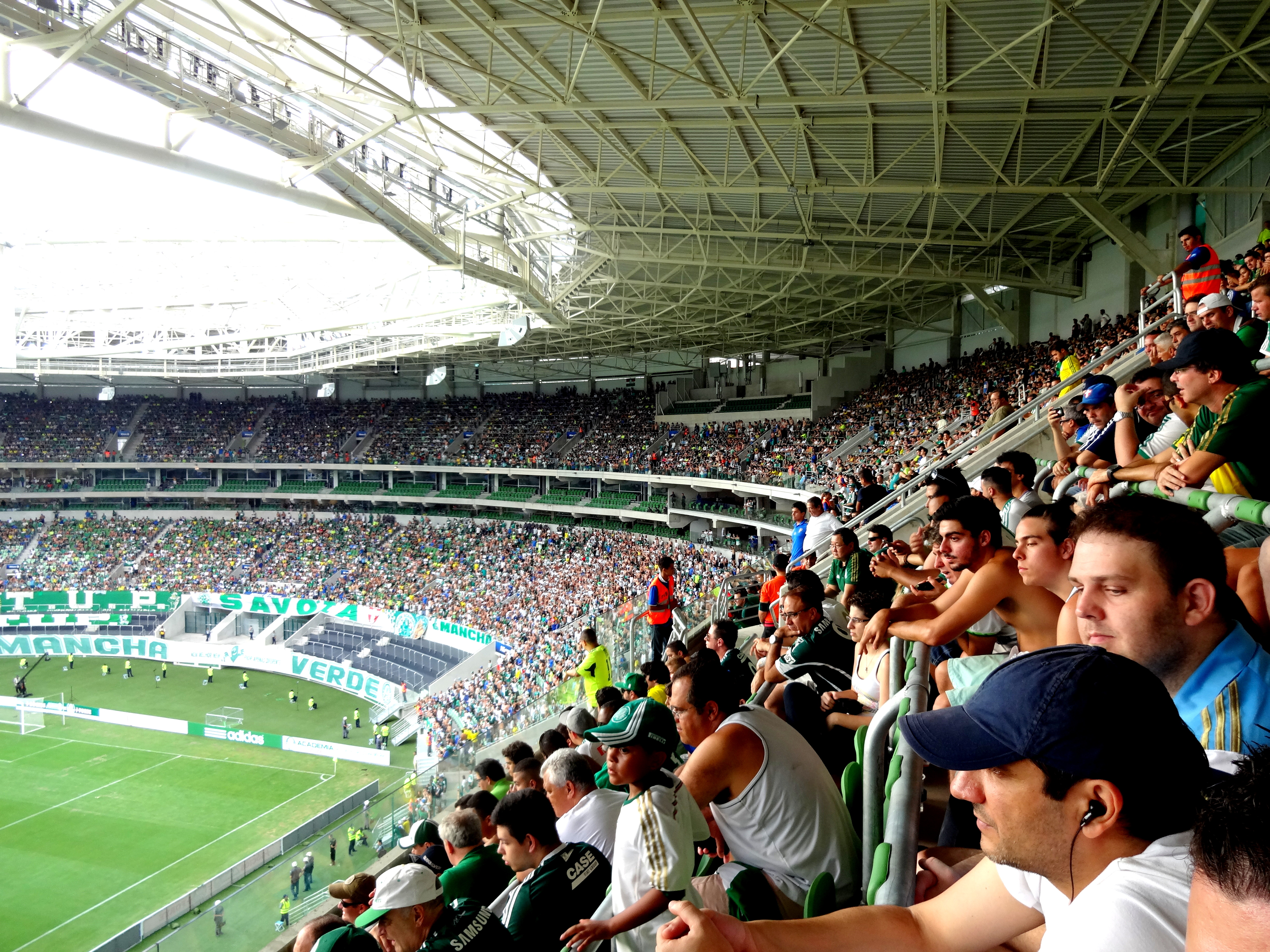
A game between Palmeiras and Shandong Luneng

Before the 20th century, traditional sports were the main form of physical activity in Shandong, while modern competitive sports gradually became dominant. The 1903 Hetan Games (阖滩运动会) in Yantai was one of the most prominent early modern athletic competitions in China. After the outbreak of the Second Sino-Japanese War, most sports activities came to a halt. Following the founding of the People's Republic of China, mass sports movements gained momentum in Shandong. In October 1953, the province established the Shandong Provincial Sports Committee. During the Cultural Revolution, all sports activities were suspended and administrative agencies ceased functioning. After the Reform and Opening-Up, Shandong successfully hosted over 70 national competitions, including championships, league matches at various levels, regional tournaments, title contests, and cup competitions. Today, Shandong is home to several professional sports clubs such as Shandong Taishan F.C., Qingdao Hainiu F.C., Qingdao West Coast F.C., Qingdao Red Lions F.C., Shandong Hi-Speed Kirin, and Qingdao Eagles.

Shandong has hosted numerous major sports events, including the National Games, the World Table Tennis Championships, and the AFC Asian Cup. Qingdao also served as a co-host city for the 2008 Summer Olympics sailing events. In 2009, Shandong hosted the 11th National Games of China, ranking first nationwide in terms of gold medals, total medals, and overall points. Moreover, since 2009, Shandong has achieved five consecutive championship at the National Games of China, leading both the gold medal and total medal counts.

The year 2015 is considered the "inaugural year" of marathon events in Shandong. Major marathons have since been held in cities such as Dongying, Yantai, Weifang, Tai'an, Qingdao, Linyi, Zibo (Gaoqing), Tengzhou, and Jining. Among them, Dongying, Yantai, Tai'an, Qingdao (Laixi), Qingdao (High-tech Zone), and Linyi host international marathons.

Prominent athletes from Shandong include table tennis world champion Zhang Jike, billiards player Pan Xiaoting (nine-ball), Olympic shooting champion Du Li, Olympic weightlifter Liu Chunhong, long-distance runner Xing Huina, and gymnast Xing Aowei.

=== Events held in Shandong ===
- 2009 National Games of China
- 2002 Table Tennis World Cup
- 2004 AFC Asian Cup
- 2007 A3 Champions Cup
- Sailing at the 2008 Summer Olympics and Paralympics
- 2011 Sudirman Cup
- 2012 Badminton Asia Championships
- 2012 Asian Beach Games

=== Professional sports teams based in Shandong ===
- Chinese Basketball Association
  - Shandong Hi-Speed Kirin
  - Qingdao Eagles
- Chinese Super League
  - Shandong Taishan
  - Qingdao Hainiu
  - Qingdao West Coast
- China League One
  - Qingdao Red Lions

=== Former professional sports teams based in Shandong ===
- Jinan Xingzhou
- Qingdao Haisha
- Qingdao Sunrise
- Qingdao Hailifeng
- Qingdao Huanghai
- Jining Dranix
- Shandong Tengding
- Yantai Yiteng F.C.

== Sister regions ==
Since October 1979, when Qingdao and Shimonoseki, Yamaguchi Prefecture, Japan established the first pair of sister cities in Shandong Province, by the end of October 2016, Shandong had 211 pairs of international sister provinces/states and cities (including 36 at the provincial level), as well as 214 pairs of international friendly cooperative relationships (28 at the provincial level). The total number of international partnerships ranks among the top in China.

Currently, Shandong's relationships with South Australia and Bavaria have become exemplary models of a new type of international provincial partnerships. As of 2024, Shandong has sister regions as follows:

- Yamaguchi Prefecture, Japan
- Wakayama Prefecture, Japan
- South Hwanghae Province, North Korea
- Brittany, France
- South Australia, Australia
- Connecticut, United States
- Bavaria, Germany
- Marche, Italy
- North Western Province, Sri Lanka
- South Gyeongsang Province, South Korea
- Texas, United States
- North Holland, Netherlands
- Kherson Oblast, Ukraine
- Quảng Nam, Vietnam
- Upper Austria, Austria
- Cluj County, Romania
- East Sepik Province, Papua New Guinea
- (Federated States of Micronesia) Kosrae State, Micronesia
- La Libertad Region, Peru
- Western Cape, South Africa
- Bahia, Brazil
- Ilocos Norte, Philippines
- Sousse Governorate, Tunisia
- Anzoátegui State, Venezuela
- Monagas State, Venezuela
- Quebec, Canada
- Khuzestan Province, Iran
- Republic of Tatarstan, Russia
- Buenos Aires Province, Argentina
- Gyeonggi Province, South Korea
- Ogun State, Nigeria
- Aargau, Switzerland
- Masovian Voivodeship, Poland
- Punjab, Pakistan
- Bangkok, Thailand

== See also ==
- Major national historical and cultural sites in Shandong
- Shandong people
- Shantung Problem
- East Asian snowstorms of 2009–2010
