= G1815 Weifang–Rizhao Expressway =

Road in China

Weifang–Rizhao Expressway
- 潍坊－日照高速公路
- Weiri Expressway 潍日高速公路

Route information
- Auxiliary route of G18
- Length: 184.65 km (114.74 mi)

Major junctions
- North end: S309 in Hanting District, Weifang, Shandong
- South end: G1511 in Donggang District, Rizhao, Shandong

Location
- Country: China

Highway system
- National Trunk Highway System; Primary; Auxiliary; National Highways; Transport in China
← G1813	→ G1816

The G1815 Weifang–Rizhao Expressway (Chinese: 潍坊—日照高速公路), also referred to as the Weiri Expressway (Chinese: 潍日高速公路), is an expressway in Shandong, China that connects Weifang to Rizhao.

== History ==
Construction began on 25 March 2013 and it was completed and opened to traffic on 1 November 2018. During the planning stage it was originally designated as Shandong Provincial Expressway S23.

== Route ==
The expressway starts in Hanting District, Weifang, then continues through Weicheng District, Changle County, Anqiu, Zhucheng and Wulian County, before terminating in Donggang District, Rizhao.
