= China National Highway 206 =

Road in China

National Highway 206
- 206国道

Route information
- Length: 2,375 km (1,476 mi)

Major junctions
- From: Weihai, Shandong
- To: Shantou, Guangdong

Location
- Country: China

Highway system
- National Trunk Highway System; Primary; Auxiliary
← G205	→ G207

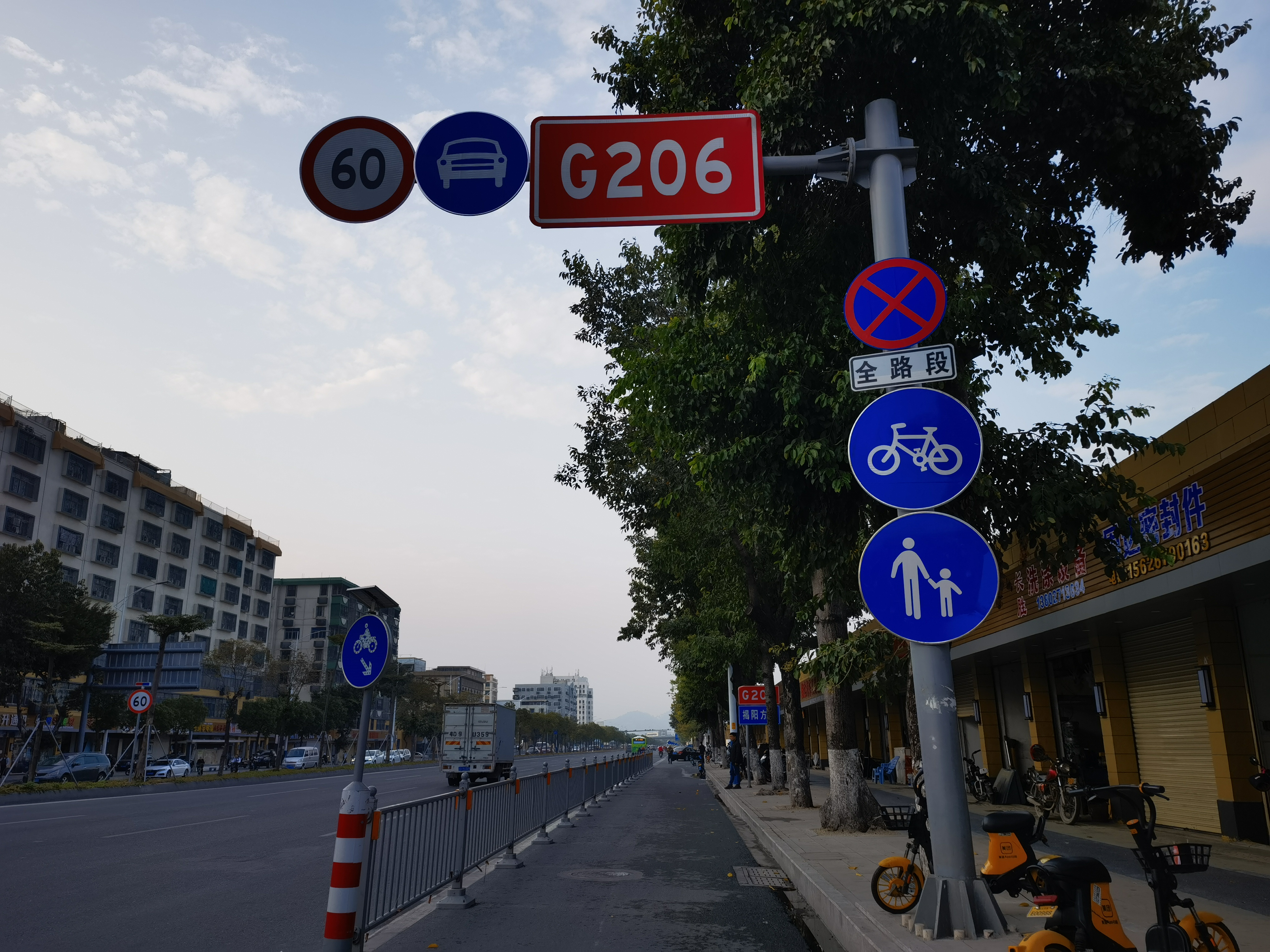
Starting sign of Shantou end of National Highway 206 at the intersection of Chaoshan Road and University Road, Shantou, Guangdong, China

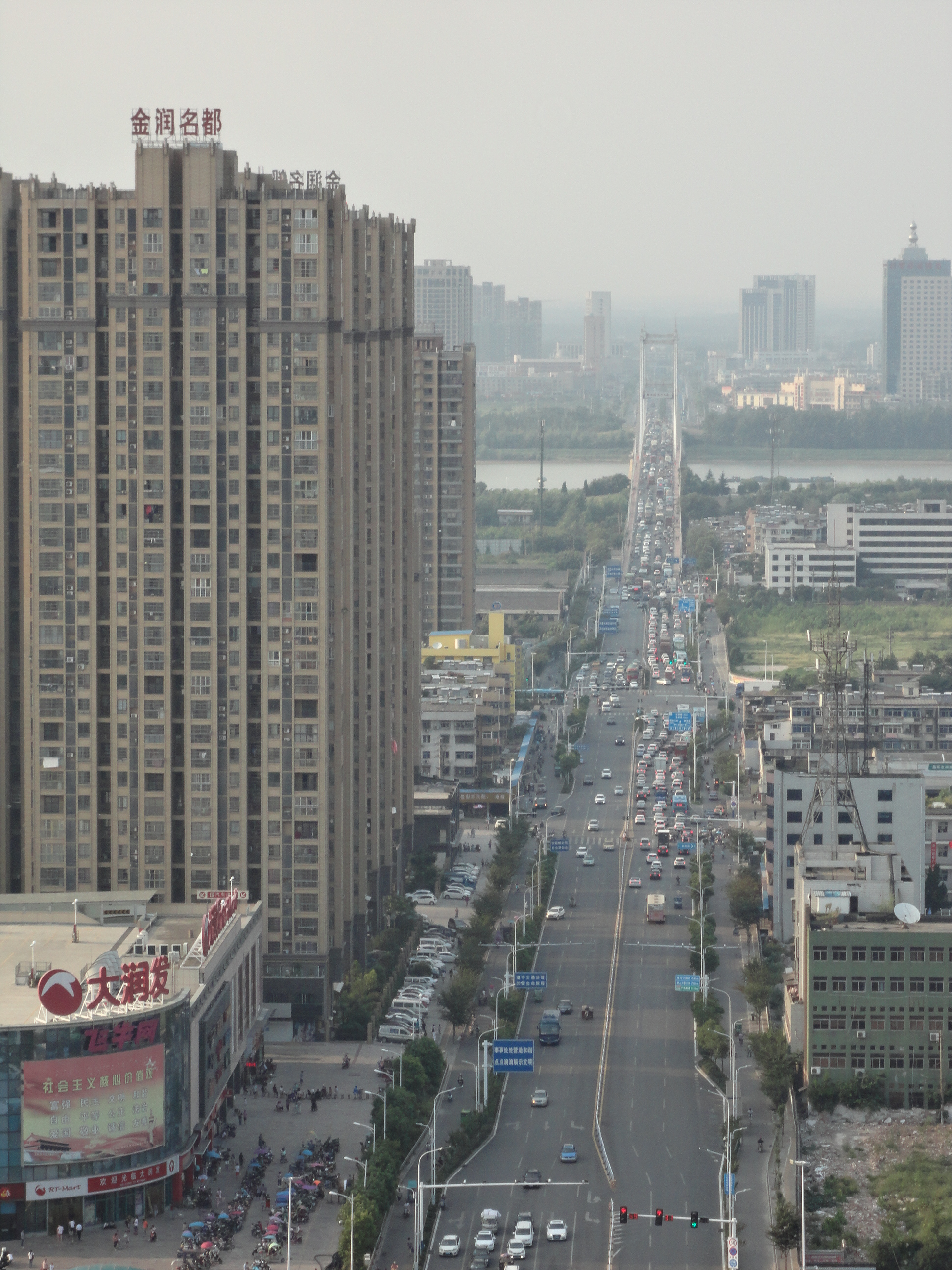
National Highway 206, Huaihe Highway Bridge, Jiefang Road, Bengbu, Anhui, China

China National Highway 206 (G206) runs from Weihai, Shandong Province to Shantou, Guangdong Province in China. It is 2,375 kilometres in length and runs south from Yantai, via Shandong, Jiangsu, Anhui, Jiangxi Province, to end in Guangdong Province.

== Route and distance ==
Route and distance

City	Distance (km)
Weihai, Shandong	0
Penglai City, Shandong	74
Longkou, Shandong	124
Laizhou, Shandong	192
Changyi, Shandong	259
Hanting District, Shandong	277
Weifang, Shandong	292
Fangzi District, Shandong	305
Anqiu, Shandong	323
Zhucheng, Shandong	384
Ju County, Shandong	468
Linyi, Shandong	543
Luozhuang District, Shandong	552
Cangshan County, Shandong	583
Zaozhuang, Shandong	632
Yicheng District, Shandong	642
Jiawang District, Jiangsu	688
Xuzhou, Jiangsu	726
Suzhou, Anhui	808
Huainan, Anhui	941
Hefei, Anhui	1056
Feixi, Anhui	1076
Shucheng, Anhui	1108
Tongcheng, Anhui	1164
Huaining, Anhui	1202
Anqing, Anhui	1239
Dongzhi County, Anhui	1295
Jingdezhen, Jiangxi	1435
Leping, Jiangxi	1479
Yingtan, Jiangxi	1585
Jinxi County, Jiangxi	1635
Nancheng County, Jiangxi	1681
Nanfeng, Jiangxi	1725
Guangchang, Jiangxi	1781
Shicheng, Jiangxi	1853
Ruijin, Jiangxi	1925
Huichang, Jiangxi	1969
Xunwu, Jiangxi	2080
Pingyuan County, Guangdong	2141
Meizhou, Guangdong	2189
Fengshun, Guangdong	2302
Shantou, Guangdong	2375

== See also ==
- China National Highways
