= Kuiwen, Weifang =

Kuiwen 奎文区
- District
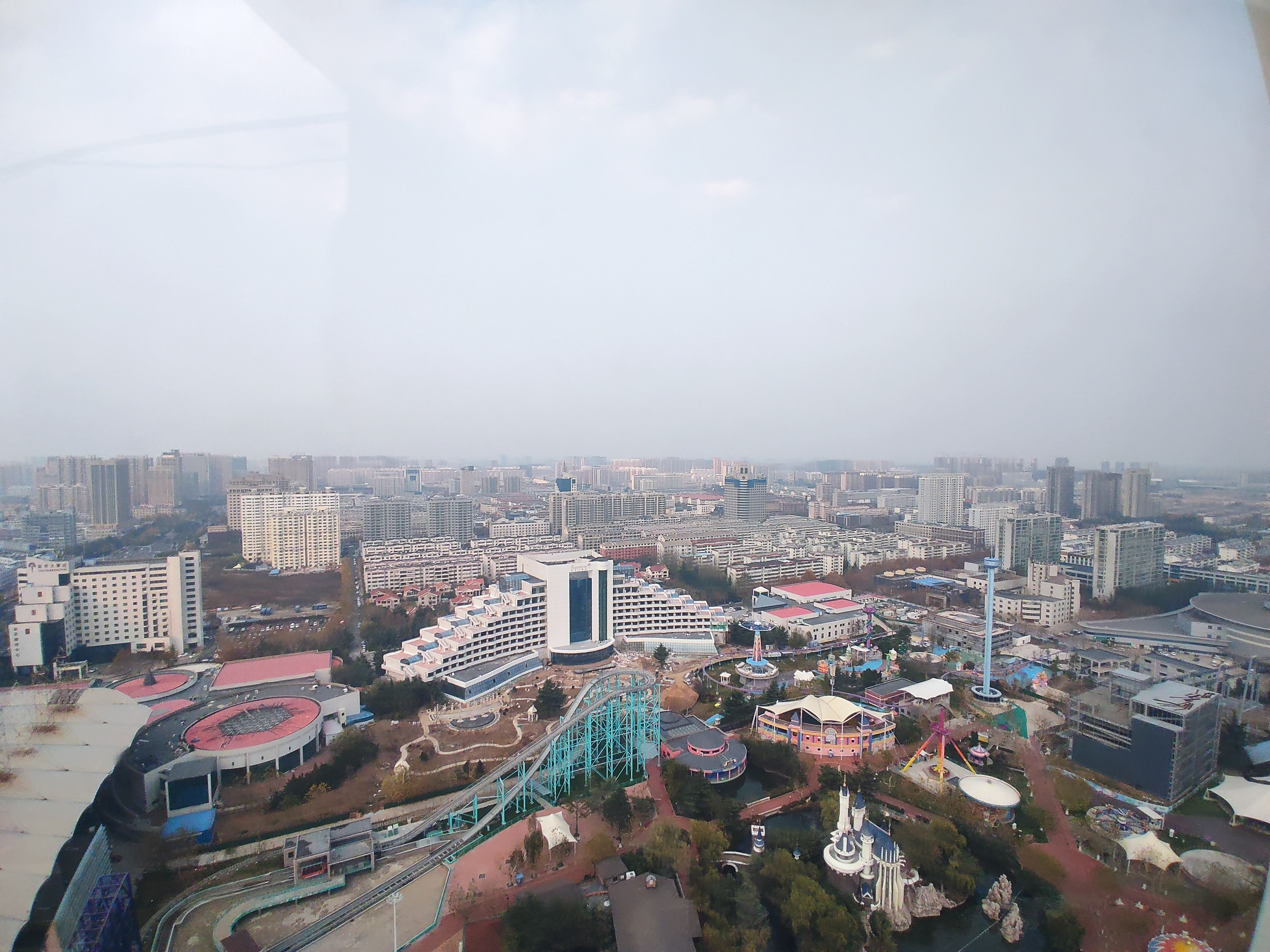

- Location in Shandong
- Coordinates: 36°42′25″N 119°07′59″E
- Country: People's Republic of China
- Province: Shandong
- Prefecture-level city: Weifang

Area
  - Total: 187.78 km^{2} (72.50 sq mi)

Population (2018)
  - Total: 456,310
  - Density: 2,430.0/km^{2} (6,293.7/sq mi)
- Time zone: UTC+8 (China Standard)
- Postal code: 261000

Kuiwen (Chinese: 奎文; Chinese: 奎文區; pinyin: Kuíwén) is an urban district of the city of Weifang, Shandong province, China. It has an area of 71 km^{2} (27 sq mi) and according to the Seventh Census, as of 00:00 on November 1, 2020, the resident population of Kuiwen District was 475,103 people.

== History ==
In 1994, the former Weicheng District was divided into two districts with the Bailang River as the boundary, with Kweiwen District established on the east side of the river and Weicheng District on the west side of the river.

== Geography ==
Kuiwen District, located in Weifang City, central north, northeast and adjacent to the Hanting District, west of the Bailang River as the boundary, and Weicheng District, south and southeast of Fangzi District adjoining. It lies between latitude 36°35′00″-36°45′00″N and longitude 119°03′45″-119°18′45″E, with a maximum straight-line distance of 17.2 km from north to south and 10.2 km from east to west, and a boundary line length of 130.41 km, with a total area of 187.78 square kilometres. It extends 193 kilometres to the provincial capital Jinan in the west and 155 kilometres to Qingdao in the east.

== Administrative divisions ==
In October 2022, the district was divided into 10 subdistricts.

Subdistricts

- Dongguan Subdistrict (东关街道)
- Dayu Subdistrict (大虞街道)
- Liyuan Subdistrict (梨园街道)
- Nianlibao Subdistrict (廿里堡街道)
- Weizhou Road Subdistrict (潍州路街道)
- Beifan Subdistrict (北苑街道)
- Guangwen Subdistrict (广文街道)
- Xincheng Subdistrict (新城街道)
- Qingchi Subdistrict (清池街道)
- Beihailu Subdistrict(北海路街道)
