= Kwan =

Kwan may refer to:

== People ==
- Kwan (surname) (關), a Chinese surname
- Kwandwane "Kwan" Browne (born 1977), Trinidadian field hockey player
- Kwan Cheatham (born 1995), American basketball player for Ironi Nes Ziona of the Israel Basketball Premier League
- Gavin Kwan, Indonesian football player
- Suchakree "Kwan" Poomjang (born 1975), Thai former professional snooker player

== Other uses ==
- Kwan (band), a Finnish hip hop/pop group.
- Kwan (martial arts), a Korean term for a school or clan of martial artists.
- Mandarin (bureaucrat), bureaucrat scholar in the government of Joseon dynasty.
- String of cash coins (currency unit), a superunit of the Korean mun.

== See also ==
- Guan (disambiguation)
- Kuang (disambiguation)
- Kwon
- Quan
- Quon (disambiguation)
