= Dongguan (disambiguation) =

Dongguan may refer to:

- Dongguan (東莞/东莞), a city in Guangdong, China.
- Dongguan Church, in Shenyang, Liaoning, China
- Dongguan Mosque, in Xining, Qinghai, China
- Dongguan Town, Fujian, in Yongchun County, Fujian
  - Dongguan Bridge, an ancient bridge in Dongguan Town
- 3476 Dongguan, main-belt asteroid
- Dongguan Street (Yangzhou), Jiangsu
- Dongguang County, Hebei

== See also ==
- Xiguan, "west gate"
- Beiguan (disambiguation), "north gate"
- Nanguan (disambiguation), "south gate"
