= Guan =

Guan may refer to:

- Guan (bird), any of a number of bird species of the family Cracidae, of South and Central America
- Guan (surname), several similar Chinese surnames
  - Guān, Chinese surname
- Guan (state), ancient Chinese city-state
- Guan (instrument), a Chinese wind instrument
- Guan (headwear), a Chinese hat
- Guang people, or Guan people, a people of modern Ghana
- Mandarin (bureaucrat), bureaucrat scholar in the government of imperial China
- String of cash coins (currency unit), an old currency unit used for Chinese cash coins
- Guan ware, one of the Five Great Kilns of Song dynasty China
- Guan District, a district in the Oti Region of Ghana
- Guan (Ghana parliament constituency), a parliamentary constituency in Ghana

Locations in China

- Gu'an County (固安县), Hebei
  - Gu'an Town (固安镇), seat of Gu'an County
- Guan County, Shandong (冠县)
- Dujiangyan City (灌县), formerly Guan County, Sichuan

== See also ==
- Kwon
- Kuan (disambiguation)
- Kwan (disambiguation)
- Quan (disambiguation)
- Quon (disambiguation)
