= Guangqi =

Guang Qi (pinyin) or Kuang Chi (Wade–Giles) may refer to:

== 光啓 / 光啟 / 光启 ==
Guāng Qǐ (pinyin) or Kuang Ch'i (Wade–Giles) is a Chinese given name (simplified Chinese: 光启; traditional Chinese: 光啟), may refer to:

- Xu Guangqi (simplified Chinese: 徐光启; traditional Chinese: 徐光啓; Wade–Giles: Hsü Kuang-ch‘i), Chinese scholar-bureaucrat, Catholic convert, agricultural scientist, astronomer, and mathematician of the Ming Dynasty
  - Xu Guangqi Memorial Hall (徐光启纪念馆)
  - Kuang-Chi (Chinese: 光启) a Chinese technology company named after Xu Guangqi
  - Xavier School, also known as Kuang Chi School (simplified Chinese: 光启学校; traditional Chinese: 光啓學校; pinyin: Guāngqǐ Xúexìao; Hokkien: Kông Khē Hák Hàu; meaning: Guāngqǐ School), a Chinese-language Filipino school named after Xu Guangqi
- Lu Guangqi (simplified Chinese: 卢光启; traditional Chinese: 盧光啟), an official of the Chinese dynasty Tang Dynasty

== 广汽 / 廣汽 ==
Guǎngqì (pinyin) or Kuang-Ch'i (Wade–Giles) (simplified Chinese: 广汽; traditional Chinese: 廣汽) may refer to:

- Guangqi Honda (Chinese: 广汽本田), a Sino-Japanese joint venture
- GAC Group, (Chinese: 广汽集团; pinyin: Guǎng Qì Jí Tuán), parent company of Guangqi Honda

== See also ==
- Guang (disambiguation)
- Kuang (disambiguation)
- Qi (disambiguation)
- Chi (disambiguation)
