= Guan (surname) =

Guan may refer to any of at least four Chinese family names (all rendered in Cantonese as Kwan, or also in English as Kuan). The four names are as follows:

== Guān (關) ==
The most famous of all the Guan surnames due to its association with the war deity Guan Yu, the Guan (關) family name came from Dongfu (董父) the descendant of ruler Shuan (叔安) in Chifeng in old Rehe Province.

- Guwalgiya (瓜尔佳) family the Jurchen people of Jin dynasty

== Guān (官) ==
官
- Romanisation: Guān

Guan (官) is a Chinese family name, Guan, Kuan, Quan, Kwan in common, origin from;

- During the Zhou dynasty, Guan (官) family found from name of Guan Country of Jin (state) (晉)
- The Guan People (官) are an old Ancient Chinese Minority, the surname Guan came from the tribe name
- In the Chu state, shortened from the compound surname 上官 (Shangguan)
- Another Guan (關) family adopted the surname Guan (官) with the same dialect
- During the Jin dynasty (金), Mulao (仫佬) people took the surname Guan (官)
- Manchu people, Mongolian use surname Guan (官)

=== People with the surname Guān 官 ===
- Ella Koon (官恩娜), Hong Kong actress

== Guǎn (管) ==
Guan (Chinese: 管; pinyin: guǎn; Wade–Giles: kuan³; lit. 'pipe/tube/duct', 'a woodwind instrument', 'to manage/control'), The corresponding Vietnamese version is Quản, the anglicized variation of which is Quan.

- Guan Shu (管叔) the ruler of the State of Guan and uncle of King Wu of Zhou
- King Mu of Zhou of the Zhou dynasty
- Xibe people in northeast China during the Qing dynasty period

=== People with the surname Guăn 管 ===
- Guan Zhong (管仲, ? – 645 BCE) of the State of Qi
- Guan Pinghu (管平湖, 1897–1967), Chinese guqin musician
- Guan Moye (管謨業, 1955), pen name Mo Yan (莫言), Chinese writer
- Guan Chenchen (管晨辰, 2004), Chinese artistic gymnast
- Guan Heng, Chinese human rights activist

== Guàn (灌) ==
- Guan (灌) family name came from Yu the Great during the Xia dynasty

=== People with the surname Guàn 灌 ===
- Guan Ying (灌嬰), Han dynasty general

== Fictional characters ==
- Master Monk Guan, a fictional character on Kid's WB's Xiaolin Showdown
