= Qing Lan =

- Education: Weifang Medical University; Chinese Academy of Preventive Medicine; Johns Hopkins Bloomberg School of Public Health
- Scientific career
- Fields: Molecular epidemiology, indoor air quality, occupational exposure, lung cancer
- Workplaces: National Cancer Institute

Qing Lan is a Chinese physician-scientist and molecular epidemiologist who researches indoor air pollution, lung cancer, and occupational exposures. She is a senior investigator in the occupational and environmental epidemiology branch at the National Cancer Institute.

== Life ==
Lan earned a M.D. from the Weifang Medical University in 1985. In 2001, she completed a Ph.D. in molecular epidemiology at the Chinese Academy of Preventive Medicine, as part of a joint training program with the U.S. Environmental Protection Agency and the University of North Carolina at Chapel Hill. Lan earned a M.P.H. at the Johns Hopkins Bloomberg School of Public Health.

In 2008, Lan was tenured at National Institutes of Health (NIH). She uses epidemiologic methods, exposure assessment approaches, and biomarker platforms to evaluate relationships between exposures and cancer. Lan is a senior investigator in the occupational and environmental epidemiology branch at the National Cancer Institute (NCI). Her research focuses on the molecular epidemiology of indoor air pollution and lung cancer and occupational exposures to known or suspected carcinogens, as well as the etiology of hematopoietic malignancies. She has conducted molecular epidemiologic studies of populations exposed to well-defined classes of chemical compounds that are known or suspected carcinogens, including polycyclic aromatic hydrocarbons (PAHs), benzene, formaldehyde, trichloroethylene, diesel, carbon black, nanoparticles, and others. Lan and her colleagues apply "omic" technologies in their studies including metabolomics, genomics, epigenetics, transcriptomics, proteomics, and whole genome sequencing, as well as conduct genome-wide association studies (GWAS).
