= Kwon Pyong =

Chinese dissident (born 1988)

- Born: 1988 (age 37–38); Yanbian Korean Autonomous Prefecture, Jilin, China
- Other names: Quan Ping; Johnny Kwon
- Education: Iowa State University; University of Queensland

Korean name
- Hangul: 권평
- RR: Gwon Pyeong
- MR: Kwŏn P'yŏng

Chinese name
- Simplified Chinese: 权平
- Traditional Chinese: 權平
Transcriptions
Standard Mandarin
- Hanyu Pinyin: Quán Píng

Kwon Pyong (Korean: 권평; born 1988), also known as Quan Ping (Chinese: 权平) or Johnny Kwon, is a Chinese dissident and human rights activist. He was charged in 2017 with inciting subversion against the Chinese state and was sentenced to 18 months in prison. In 2023, he fled to South Korea via jet ski and was detained on immigration charges. He was given a suspended prison sentence and was deported to the United States in 2024, where he planned to seek asylum.

== Background ==
Kwon was born in 1988 to an ethnically Korean family in Yanbian Korean Autonomous Prefecture, China. He attended Iowa State University in the United States, studying aerospace engineering, and graduated in either 2012 or 2014. At some point, he also attended the University of Queensland in Australia. During his student years, Kwon took on the name of Johnny, maintained a blog and praised the democratic conduct of the 2012 U.S. presidential election. According to his father, he grew critical of China's one-party system during his time abroad.

Kwon returned to China after graduation. He ran an online clothing brand, invested in cryptocurrency, and worked for the family trade business. He travelled to Lebanon and Syria as a photojournalist, and joined the 2014 Occupy Central protests in Hong Kong. He regularly visited South Korea.

== Arrest and imprisonment in China ==
In 2016, Kwon posted a picture of himself outside a government building, wearing a shirt mocking Chinese leader Xi Jinping. The shirt referred to Xi as "Xitler" in English, and in Chinese as "Xi Baozi", and "Big Spender". Kwon planned to wear the shirt in public on 1 October, National Day, as a political protest, but was detained by Yanji municipal police before he could do so. Radio Free Asia reported that he was being held incommunicado. Previously, he had suspected that he was being followed.

Kwon was charged with inciting subversion, with 15 or more than 70 of his social media posts being identified as subversive. It was unclear whether this included the picture of the shirt. Kwon's lawyers reported obstruction from the government leading up to the trial, and were fired by Kwon's parents shortly before it began. They accused the government of pressuring the couple by offering an 18-month prison sentence for Kwon if they were both fired. Kwon was convicted in February 2017 and sentenced to 18 months in prison.

The Independent Federation of Chinese Students and Scholars and other activists condemned Kwon's detention.

== Flight to South Korea ==
Kwon was released in 2018 or March 2019. He reported constant surveillance, which he attributed to his communication with Tiananmen protests organizer Wang Dan. According to an associate, he was placed under an exit ban that prevented him from legally seeking asylum in South Korea. Inspired by The Shawshank Redemption and a woman who circumnavigated Australia on a jet ski, he decided to flee to South Korea by sea. He obtained a South Korean tourist visa in 2022.

Kwon withdrew the equivalent of US$25,000 in cash in separate installments and purchased a WaveRunner jet ski. He equipped himself with a life jacket, laser pen, and motorcycle helmet, bringing food and five barrels of gasoline in tow. He departed from the Port of Weihai in August 2023, navigating with a compass and smartphone. He fell into the water twice in the course of his journey, and used all but one barrel of gasoline, throwing empty ones into the sea. Intending to arrive at a port of entry in Incheon, Kwon became stranded on a nearby mud flat, and phoned an emergency line for help. His trip spanned 14 or 16 hours and 300 km (186 mi).

Kwon's entry was the first case of illegal immigration via jet ski ever documented in South Korea. In 2026, Chinese dissident Dong Guangping took inspiration from Kwon's journey and escaped to South Korea in a similar manner.

=== Arrest and imprisonment in South Korea ===
The Korea Coast Guard rescued Kwon from the mud flat and detained him on immigration charges. According to Kwon, investigators denied him counsel and threatened to torture him. The coast guard issued a statement denying that any human rights violations had occurred. Kwon was ordered to be deported, but his legal case stayed proceedings. He pleaded asylum in South Korea.

Prosecutors requested two and a half years in prison for the immigration violations, to which Kwon pled guilty. He appealed for leniency, arguing that he was a political refugee who intended to arrive legally. In November 2023, the Incheon District Court sentenced him to one year in prison, suspended, with two years of probation. He was also convicted of dumping waste into the sea. As prosecutors appealed the sentence, immigration officials banned Kwon from exiting South Korea. The appellate court rejected the appeal in May 2024, affirming the original sentence. A judge found that he had told the coast guard that he travelled for "adventure", and made no mention of persecution. The exit ban was lifted in June, and he was deported that month to the United States, where he had a visitor visa and planned to seek asylum. According to an associate, Kwon was unsafe in South Korea as a target of Operation Fox Hunt, a Chinese operation to forcibly repatriate dissidents.

Kwon was detained by U.S. Immigration and Customs Enforcement upon arrival.

== See also ==
- Guan Heng, a Chinese human rights activist who fled to the U.S. partly by boat
- Illegal immigration to South Korea
