= Quan (disambiguation) =

Quan is a Chinese and Vietnamese surname.

Quan may also refer to:

- Quận, the name for an urban administrative unit in Vietnam
- Quan (state), a small Zhou Dynasty vassal state of Central China
- Quan, a character in Magicians of Xanth
- Quan họ, a Vietnamese folk music singing style

== See also ==
- Quanzhou (泉州), a city of Fujian, China
- List of people named Quan
- Qwan
- Kuan (disambiguation)
- Kwan (disambiguation)
- Quon (disambiguation)
- Kuon
- Kwon
