= Li Xin =

Li Xin is the name of:

- Li Xin (Qin) (fl. 220s BC), military general of the Qin state during the Warring States period
- Li Xin (Western Liang) (died 420), ruler of Western Liang of the Sixteen Kingdoms
- Li Xin (journalist) (born 1979), Chinese journalist

== Sportspeople ==
- Li Xin (basketball) (born 1969), Chinese basketball player and coach
- Li Xin (footballer, born 1989), Chinese association footballer
- Li Xin (footballer, born 1991), Chinese association footballer
- Li Xin (baseball) (born 1992), Chinese baseball player
- Li Xin (skier) (born 1992), Chinese cross country skier

== See also ==
- Lee Hsin (1953–2017), Taiwanese politician, whose name can also be romanized as "Li Xin"
- Lixin County, a county in Anhui, China
