= Nanguan =

Nanguan may refer to:

- Nanguan music (南管), a style of Chinese classical music
- Nanguan District (南关区), Changchun, Jilin

Subdistricts (南关街道)

- Nanguan Subdistrict, Suzhou, Anhui, in Yongqiao District, Suzhou, Anhui
- Nanguan Subdistrict, Baoding, in Nanshi District, Baoding, Hebei
- Nanguan Subdistrict, Zhangjiakou, in Xuanhua District, Zhangjiakou, Hebei
- Nanguan Subdistrict, Anyang, in Wenfeng District, Anyang, Henan
- Nanguan Subdistrict, Xuchang, in Weidu District, Xuchang, Henan
- Nanguan Subdistrict, Zhengzhou, in Guancheng Hui District, Zhengzhou, Henan
- Nanguan Subdistrict, Datong, in Cheng District, Datong, Shanxi
- Nanguan Subdistrict, Jiaozhou, in Jiaozhou City, Shandong
- Nanguan Subdistrict, Weifang, in Weicheng District, Weifang, Shandong

Towns (南关镇)

- Nanguan, Zunyi, in Honghuagang District, Zunyi, Guizhou
- Nanguan, Lingshi County, in Lingshi County, Shanxi
