= Quon =

Quon could refer to

- Guan, a Chinese family name rendered in Cantonese as Kwan, or also in English as Quan or Quon
- Quon Kisaragi, a fictional character in the manga/novel series RahXephon
- Nissan Diesel Quon, a line of heavy-duty commercial vehicles
- Ontario v. Quon, a 2010 U.S. Supreme Court decision on electronic privacy
- A quantum object, as identified in the book Quantum Reality by physicist Nick Herbert.

== See also ==
- Quan (disambiguation)
- Guan (disambiguation)
