= Li Xin (journalist) =

Chinese pro-democracy campaigner and website editor

Li Xin 李新

Personal details
- Born: 1979 (age 46–47) Xinxiang, Henan, China
- Spouse: He Fangmei
- Education: China University of Political Science and Law
- Occupation: Editor, Democracy campaigner, Rights activist

Li Xin (Chinese: 李新) formerly a website editor for a Chinese media group called Southern Metropolis Daily, is a pro-democracy campaigner and rights activist. Li disappeared on a train from Bangkok to the northeastern border town of Nong Khai in Thailand on 11 January 2016 after he leaked confidential documents detailing Communist Party propaganda efforts. About a month later, He Fangmei, Li's wife, said she received a phone call from Li on 3 February, and was told that he had voluntarily come back to Mainland China to meet with investigators.

== Background ==
In 2007, Li set up a website called Civil Society, which advocated for human rights in China.

In 2008, Liu Xiaobo, a Chinese human rights activist and winner of the 2010 Nobel Peace Prize, and others co-authored a manifesto called Charter 08, calling for human rights, freedom of the press and democracy in China. Li was among the 6th group of people who signed the charter.

From 2010 to 2012, Li studied international relations at Jawaharlal Nehru University in India, during which time he was invited to write editorials on Chinese politics by the government of Taiwan.

After returning to China, in June 2012 Li was detained and interrogated in a hotel for a week by Chinese state security police and was threatened with spying charges if he didn't agree to spy on other activists and dissidents. He was forced to agree to do it, but Li did not provide any essential information.

In 2013, Li became a website editor for Southern Metropolis Daily in Guangdong province, where he knew many rights activists and public intellectuals.

== Disappearance in Thailand ==
After being forced by China's state security police to spy on other activists, Li decided to flee to New Delhi, India in October 2015. Li's wife, He Fangmei told The Guardian "the [Chinese] authorities said they can arrest him at any time and charge him for endangering state security and for being a spy. He is scared. He couldn’t stay in China any more. He has been trying to get out from China."

After arriving in India, Li made public several purported lists from government of sources and topics off limits to journalists in China, giving a glimpse at the operation of the regime's extensive propaganda machinery.

Li tried unsuccessfully for several months to claim political asylum from the Indian government. However his applications were rejected, as India does not accept asylum applications from Chinese nationals. Li also applied for a visa to the United States, but was rejected by the U.S. embassy in New Delhi.

In December 2015, Li's wife and infant son were sent back to their hometown in Henan province by authorities in Guangdong province after they were prevented from trying to leave the country via Hong Kong.

On 1 January 2016 Li traveled to Thailand. On 9 January, another Chinese activist Yan Bojun, who fled to Thailand in 2015, reported having dinner with Li.

On 10 January, he boarded an 8:36 p.m. train from Bangkok to the northeastern border town of Nong Khai, with the intention of trying to enter Laos to extend his Thai visa.

The next day, around 7:40 am, his wife reported losing contact with him on the instant messaging app they used to communicate.

== Reappearance in China ==
On 2 February, Li's wife He Fangmei was summoned to a police station in Henan province. The next day, she was allowed to speak to her husband, who was apparently in a different location, over an internal police telephone system.

Li told his wife that he came back to China to voluntarily help police with their investigations and that she should not talk to international media. Li refused to say where he was and asked his wife not to ask any questions. It is still unclear how Li returned to China, but his wife did not believe Li came back voluntarily.

On 3 February, The New York Times reported on He Fangmei's conversation with Li in China. The article cited a spokesman for the Thai foreign ministry saying there was no "record as yet as to whether he has left the country," and that "there is no indication whatsoever that Mr. Li Xin was abducted from Thailand."

== Other Chinese Activists ‘Disappeared’ in Thailand ==
Li's disappearance in Thailand is the fourth such instance of Chinese dissidents being captured in the country since October 2015.

On 28 October 2015, two Chinese human rights activists, Dong Guangping and Jiang Yefei were arrested in Bangkok and handed over to Chinese authorities, despite being recognized as refugees by the United Nations.

On 17 October 2015, Gui Minhai, a Chinese-born Swedish publisher who wrote gossip books about Chinese political leaders, disappeared from his apartment in the resort city of Pattaya, Thailand. The incident is widely known as the Causeway Bay Books disappearance. Three months later, he appeared on state-run China Central Television, confessing to his involvement in a fatal car accident in Thailand.

== International response ==
Major news agencies, such as CNN, BBC, Time, The Guardian, and Radio Free Asia have covered the story of Li's disappearance and re-emergence in Thailand.

The European Union, United States and the United Kingdom have expressed their concerns about the disappearances of Li and other Chinese dissidents in China.

In a statement, Human Rights Watch called the disappearance of Li and other Chinese dissidents from Thailand part of the Chinese government's "unprecedented new impulse" to snatch people outside its borders.
