= Guang =

Guang may refer to:

- Guang (vessel), an ancient Chinese drinking vessel
- Guang people, ethnic group of northern Ghana
- Guang languages, languages spoken by the Guang people
- Guangzhou, city in Guangdong, China
- Liangguang, Guangdong and Guangxi in China
- Helü, King of Wu, personal name Guang
- Guang (film), a 2018 Malaysian Mandarin-language film

== See also ==
- Prince Guang (disambiguation)
- Kuan (disambiguation)
- Guan (disambiguation)
