= Kuang =

Kuang may refer to:

- Kuang (surname) (邝/鄺), a Chinese surname
- Kuang (town), a town in Selangor, Malaysia
- Kuang (state constituency), a constituency of the Selangor State Legislative Assembly

== See also ==
- Guang (disambiguation)
- Kwang, a Korean given name
