= Beiguan =

Beiguan may refer to:

- Beiguan music (北管), type of traditional Chinese music and theatrical performance
- Tongzhou Beiguan station, a subway station in Tongzhou District, Beijing

== Places in China ==
Henan

- Beiguan District (北关区), a district of Anyang, Henan
- Beiguan, Minquan County (北关), a town in Minquan County, Henan

Shaanxi

- Beiguan Subdistrict, Xi'an (北关街道), a subdistrict of Lianhu District, Xi'an, Shaanxi
- Beiguan Subdistrict, Hanzhong (北关街道), a subdistrict of Hantai District, Hanzhong, Shaanxi

Shanxi

- Beiguan Subdistrict, Datong (北关街道), a subdistrict of Pingcheng District, Datong
- Beiguan Subdistrict, Yuci District (北关街道), a subdistrict of Yuci District, Jinzhong
- Beiguan Subdistrict, Jiexiu (北关街道), a subdistrict of Jiexiu, Jinzhong

Other provinces

- Beiguan Subdistrict, Suzhou, Anhui (北关街道), a subdistrict of Yongqiao District, Suzhou, Anhui
- Beiguan, Guangdong (北惯), a town in Yangjiang, Guangdong
- Beiguan Subdistrict, Weifang (北关街道), a subdistrict of Weicheng District, Weifang, Shandong
