= Shandong Second Medical University =

University in Weifang, China

- 潍坊医学院 (Chinese)
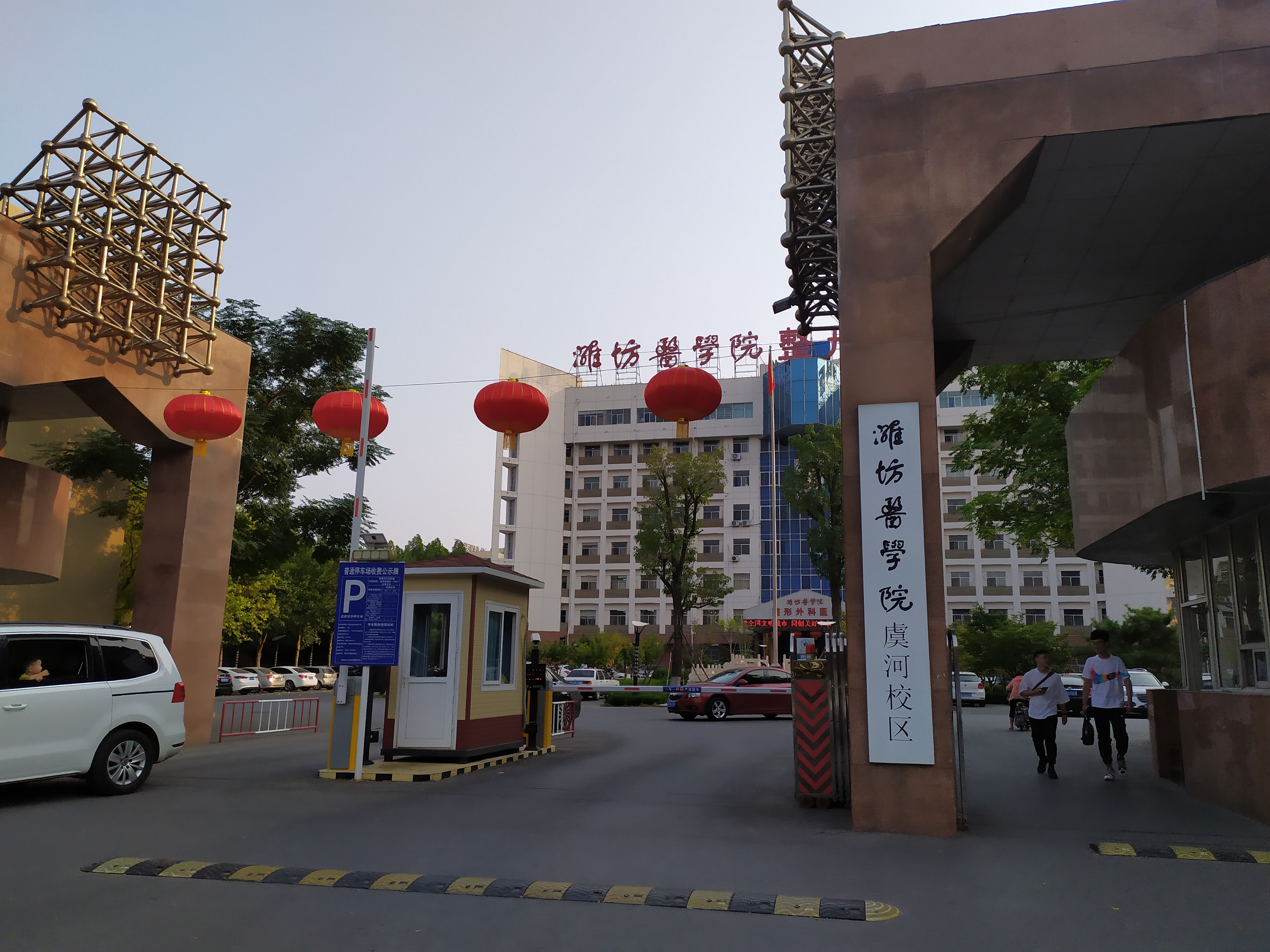
- Type: Provincial university
- Established: 1951
- Faculty: 814
- Administrative staff: 1,096
- Students: 12,789
- Postgraduates: 482
- Doctoral students: 649
- Location: Weifang, Shandong, China; 36.66596°N 119.03287°E
- Campus: urban 1 297 200 m2
- Website: www.wfmc.edu.cn

Chinese name
- Simplified Chinese: 潍坊医学院
- Traditional Chinese: 濰坊醫學院
Transcriptions
Standard Mandarin
- Hanyu Pinyin: Wéifāng Yīxuéyuàn

Shandong Second Medical University (Chinese: 山东第二医科大学), formerly known as Weifang Medical University (WMU; Chinese: 潍坊医学院), is a medical university based in Weifang, Shandong province, in China.

== History ==
The university was created as Shandong province's Changwei Medical School in 1951. It later became the Changwei Medical College which offered undergraduate courses.

In 1986, the university was approved by the Chinese Ministry of Education to offer master's degree courses in medicine. In 1987, the university was restructured and became Weifang Medical University. In 1998, it was qualified to enroll international student. In 2002, the Chinese Ministry of Education granted the Weifang Medical University permission to offer graduate medical degrees. On 21 November 2023, the Ministry of Education agreed to change the name of Weifang Medical College to Shandong Second Medical University. On 28 December 2023, Weifang Medical College officially changed its name to Shandong Second Medical University.

== Academics ==
Weifang Medical University (WFMU) is a state-owned medical university. It is located in Weifang, the international Kite Capital, at the centre of the Shandong Peninsula. WFMU covers an area of more than 1.2 million square meters. Over the past decades, WFMU has expanded the courses it offers to include health management, general sciences, law and literature, with the medical sciences as the leading discipline. WFMU is authorized to grant bachelor's and master's degrees and recruit overseas students.

WFMU is also authorized to recruit PhD candidates in collaboration with Shandong University, Southern Medical University and Huazhong University of Science and Technology, Shandong Medical Technology Educational Centre and the Basic-level Health Management Cadres Training Centre.

=== Schools and departments ===
WFMU comprises 15 schools and departments, such as the School of Humanities and Social Science, School of Public Health and Management, Nursing School, Dentistry School, Clinical Medicine Department, Anesthesiology Department, Medical Radiology Department and Preventive Medicine Department.

=== Teaching staff ===
At present, there are 1000 teaching staff. There are four supervisors for doctoral students and nearly 200 for master's students.

=== Postgraduate programs ===
There are 24 postgraduate programs, mainly enrolling postgraduates in Physiology, Immunology, Pharmacology, Anatomy, Embryology, Pathology and Pathophysiology, Pathogen Biology, Biochemistry and Molecule Biology, Internal Medicine, Surgery, Gynecology, Pediatrics, Ophthalmology, Otolaryngology, Dentistry, Neurology, Oncology, Traditional and Western Clinic Medicine, Emergency, Imaging and Nuclear Medicine, Nursing, Anesthesiology, Epidemiology and Health Statistics, Social Medicine and Health Cause Management and Applied Psychology. There are over 740 postgraduate students.

=== Undergraduate programs ===
The university offers 16 undergraduate programs: Clinical medicine, Dentistry, Nursing, Anesthesiology, Medical Imaging, Medical Laboratory, Preventive Medicine, Pharmacy, Public Health and Management, Labor and Social Security, Marketing, Law, Applied Psychology, Health Statistics, Biological Technology, English Language. There are over 14,000 full-time 3 and 5-year program students.

=== Research centers ===
There is a Medical Research Center, a Modern Educational Technology Center, a Computer Center and an Animal Supplying Center.

There is one experimental demonstration centre at the provincial level. There are six comprehensive teaching laboratories at the university level — Morphology, Function, Chemicoanalysis, Clinical Skills, Computer and Human Anatomy — and 16 speciality laboratories like Gene and Histology Engineering, Dentistry, and Nursing.

The Experimental Center of Basic Medicine is an experimental and teaching demonstration centre for universities in Shandong Province. Anatomy, Medical Ethics, Pathology, Physiology, Histology and Embryology, Pharmacology and Medical WFMU has undertaken 90 teaching and research projects at the provincial level or above and has been awarded 24 prizes in teaching, experiment and research since 2004.

There are 24 research institutes such as Pathology, Neurophysiology, Differentiation and Cycle of Stem Cell, Molecule Cell Biology, Urology Surgery, Orthopedics, Pediatrics, Anesthesiology, Community Medicine, Health Management, Epidemiology, Health Statistics and Health Economy.

==== Achievements in research ====
More than 340 research projects have been approved by the state authorities, including 16 large projects sponsored by the Foundation of State Natural Science and the national key laboratory projects, 40 projects granted by the Provincial Natural Science Fund and Middle-aged and Youth Scientists Fund and 260 projects at the bureau level. More than 220 prizes for research have been awarded, including 50 prizes for specialists at the provincial level.

Each year, the institution publishes over 870 academic papers and around 70 books. Additionally, more than 30 of its projects have been incorporated into continuing education programs at or above the provincial level. The institution has been granted over 10 national patents.

The university library holds a collection of over 2.1 million books and 3,000 kinds of Chinese and foreign journals. There are 12 comprehensive affiliated hospitals.
