= Kwang =

- Hangul: 광
- RR: Gwang
- MR: Kwang
- IPA: [kwaŋ]

Kwang, also spelled Gwang, is a Korean given name. Notable people with the name include:

- Jo Gwang (fl. 48), chief retainer of the Gaya Confederacy
- Yi Gwang (general) (1541–1607), Joseon Dynasty male general
- Im Gwang (1579–1644), Joseon Dynasty male scholar-official
- Jeongye Daewongun (1785–1841), personal name Yi Gwang, Joseon Dynasty prince
- Choe Kwang (1919–1997), North Korean male military leader
- Choi Kwang (economist) (born 1947), South Korean male economist, former Minister of Health and Welfare
- Jang Gwang (born 1952), South Korean male voice actor
- Li Gwang (born 1966), North Korean male judo practitioner
- Li Guang (footballer) (born 1991), Chinese male football player of Korean descent

People with the nickname or stage name Kwang include:

- Savio Vega (born 1964) or Kwang the Ninja, Puerto Rican professional wrestler

== See also ==
- List of Korean given names
