= Weifang =

Weifang 潍坊市
- Prefecture-level city
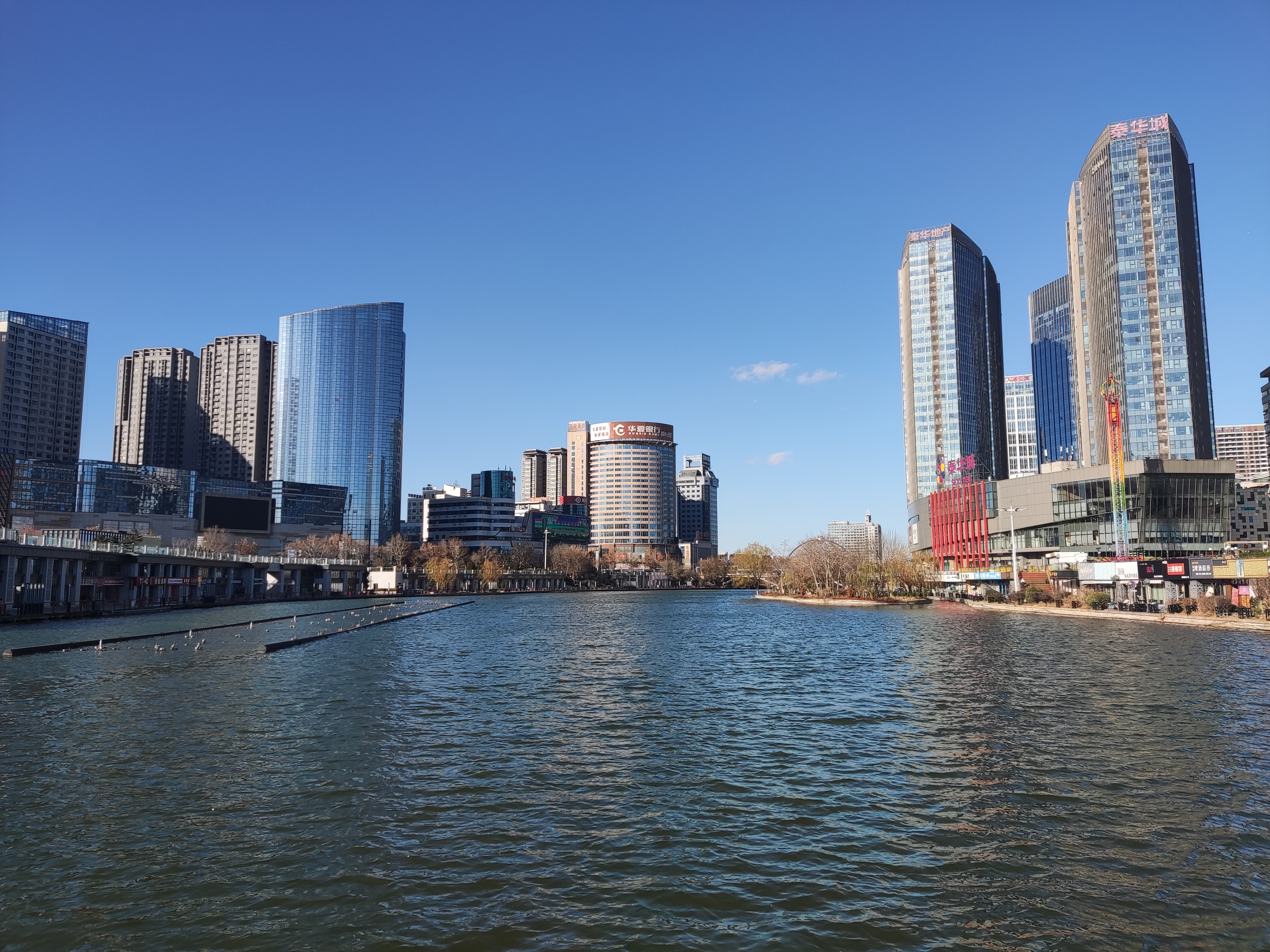
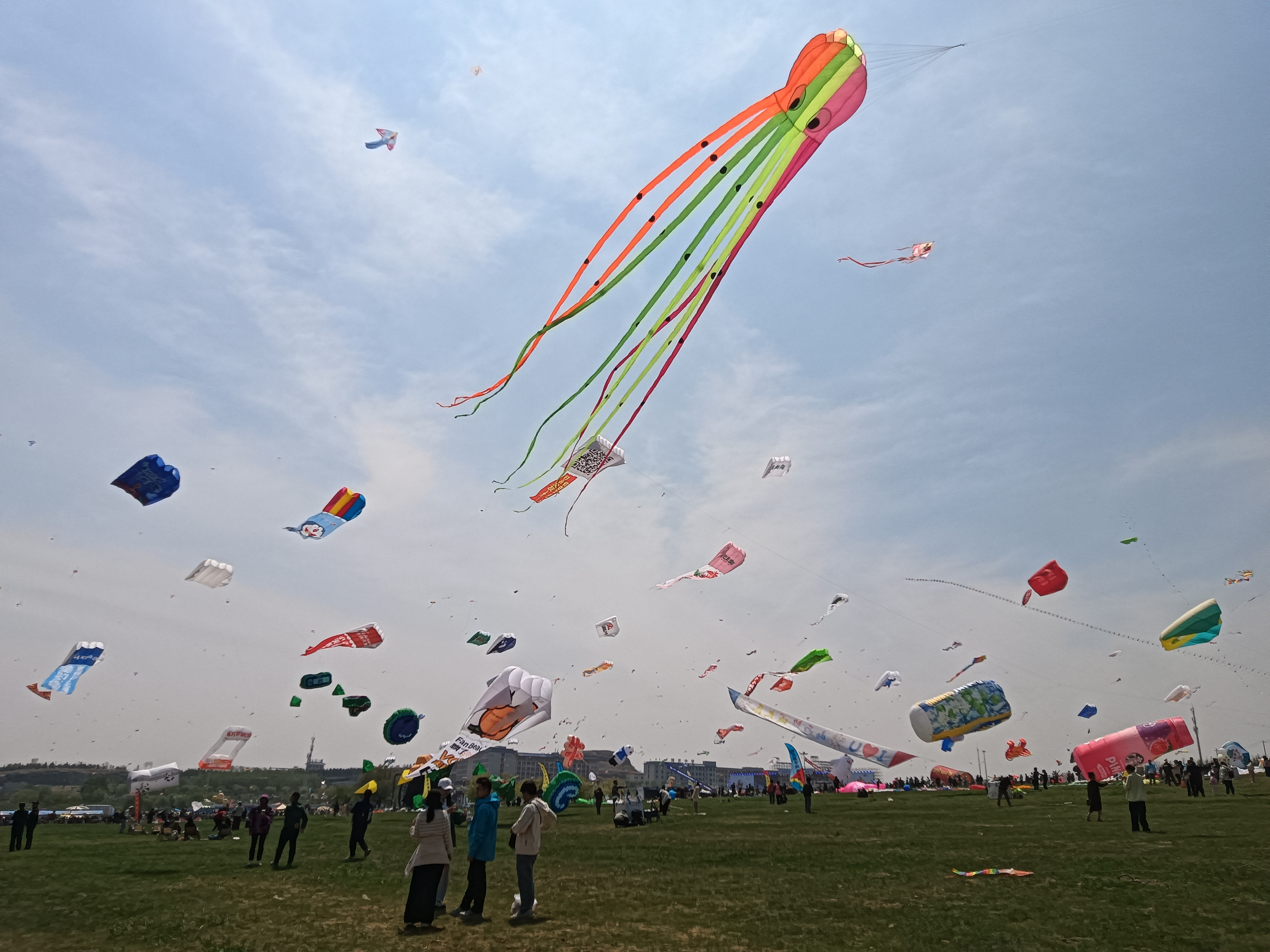
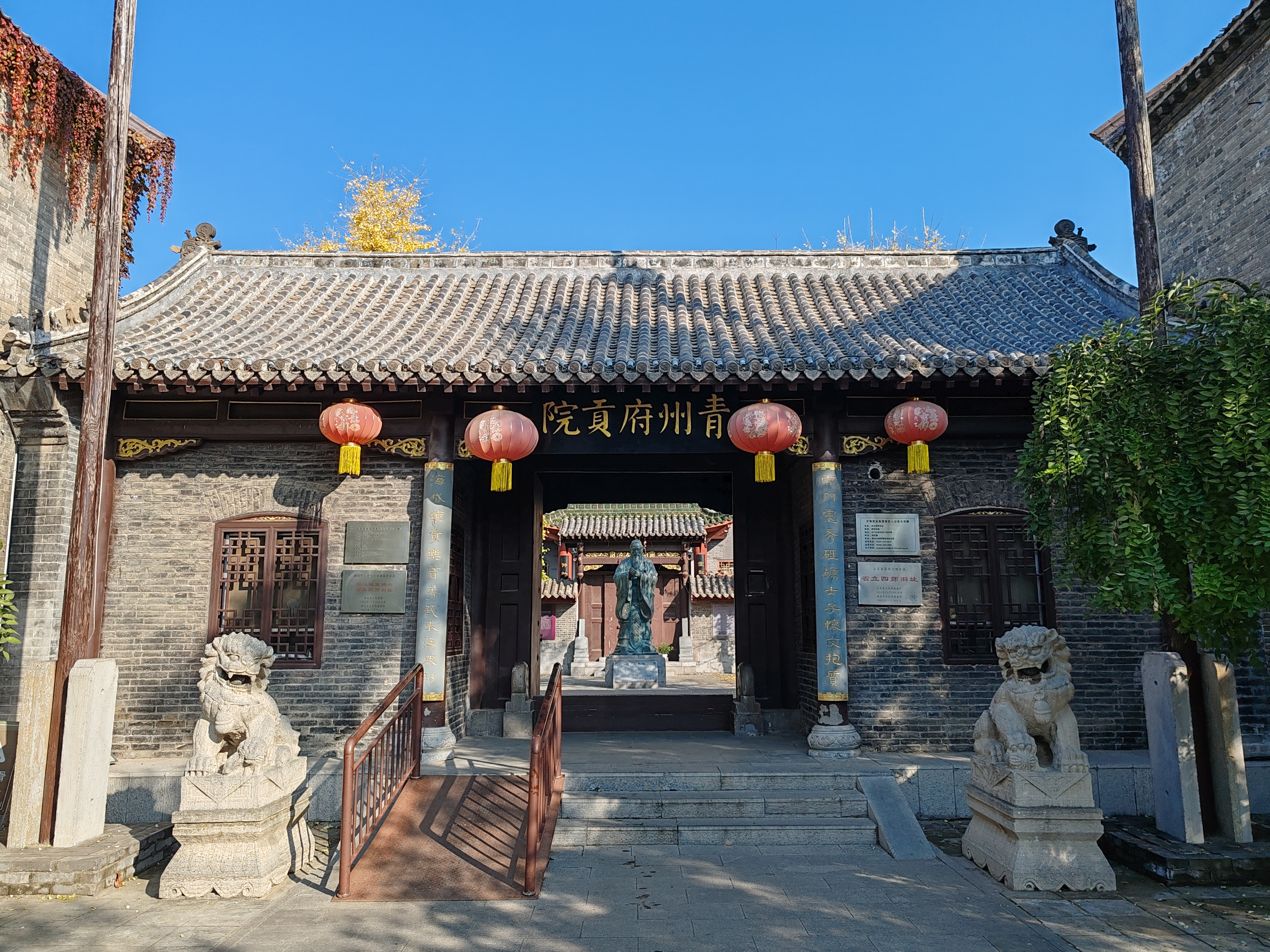
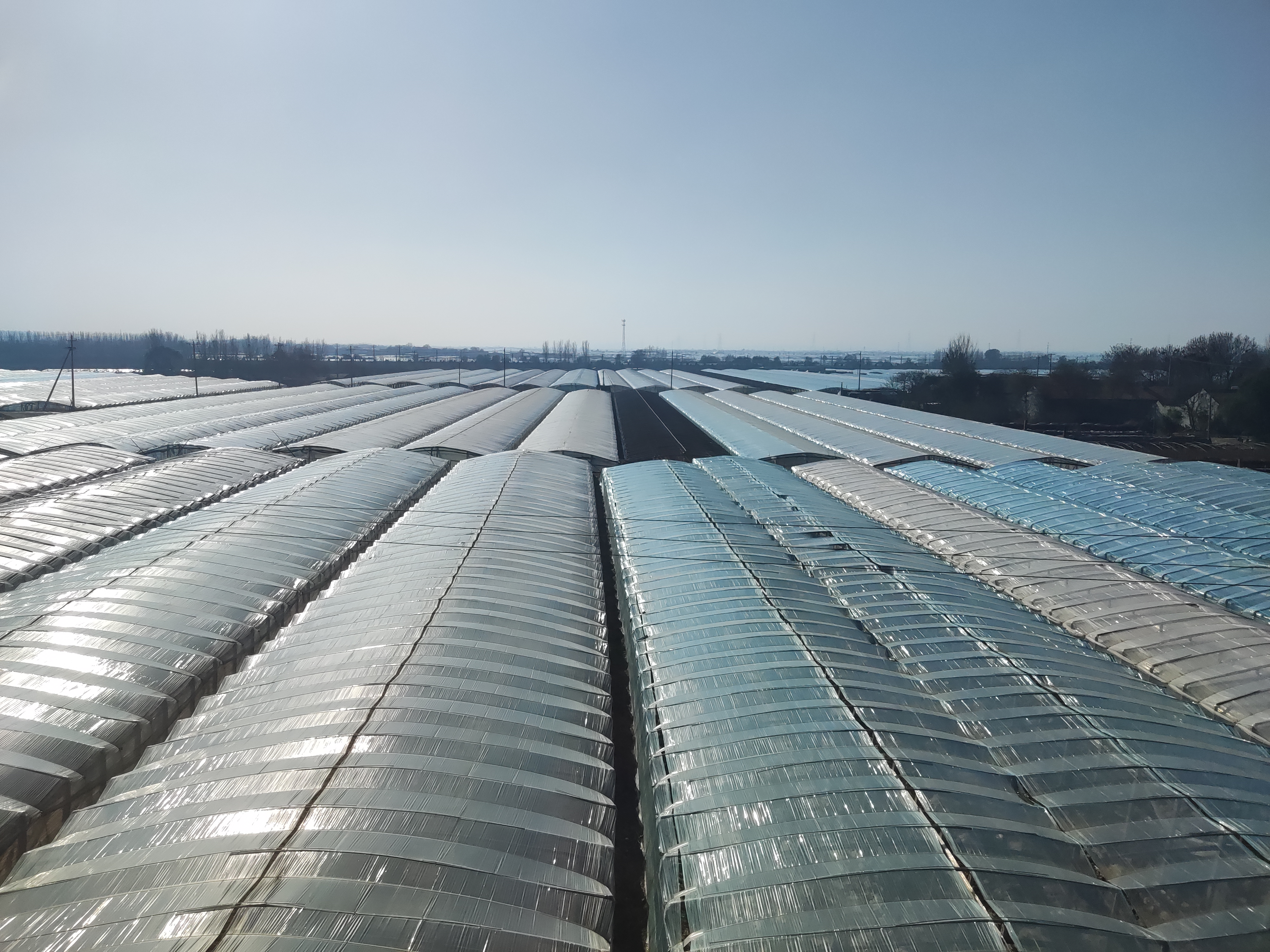
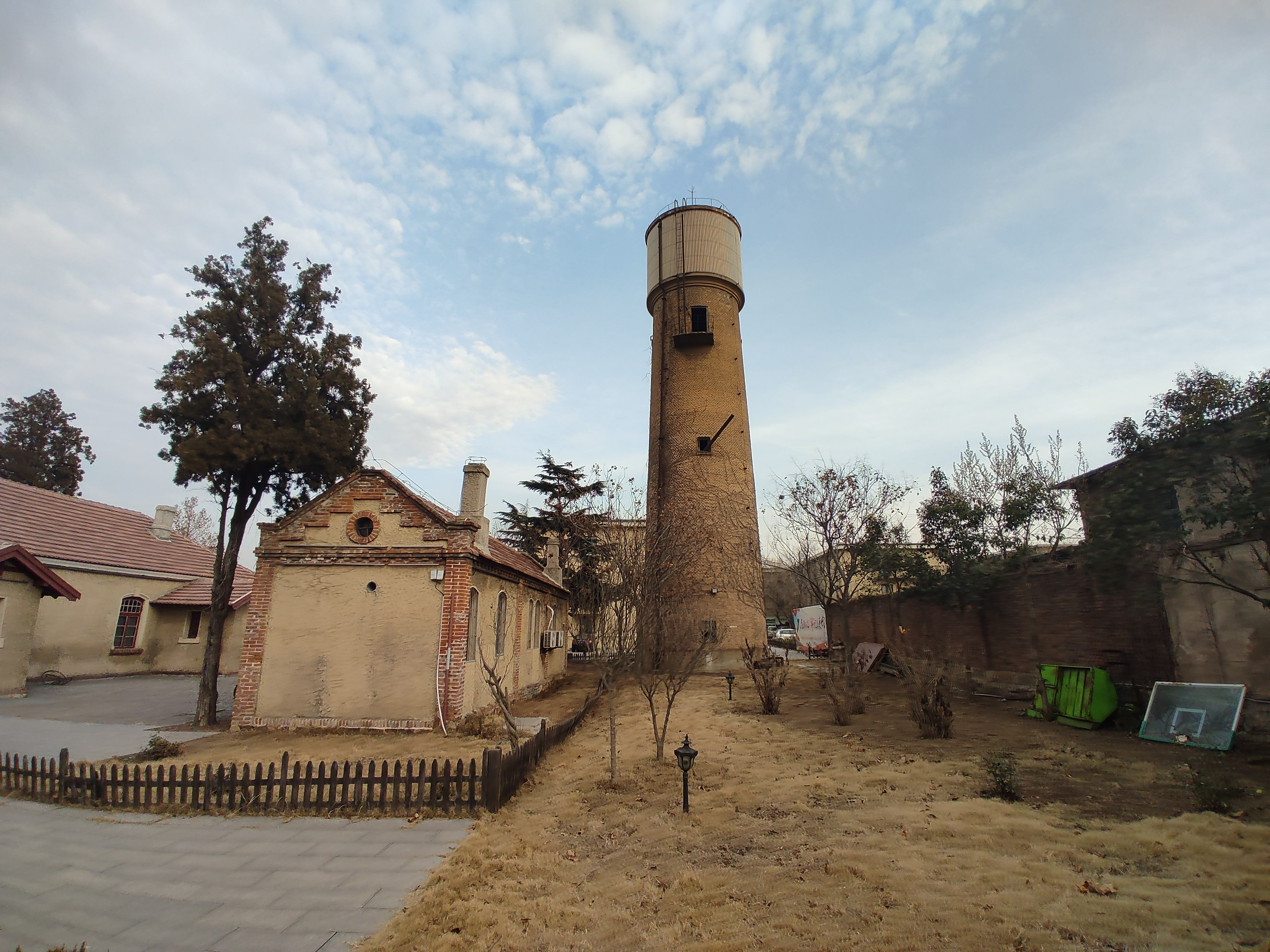
- Skyline viewed from the Fuwah Park Ferris Wheel Anqiu World Kite Park Old Qingzhou Confucius Temple Greenhouses in Changle Fangzi Industrial Zone

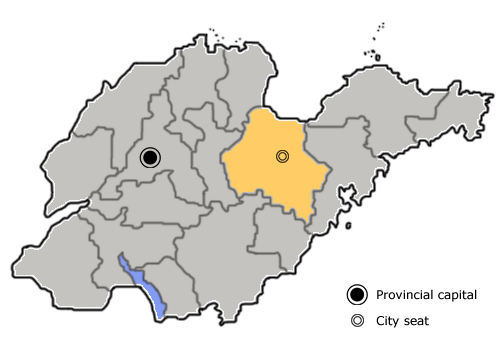
- Location of Weifang City jurisdiction in Shandong

- Location in China Weifang (China)
- Coordinates (Weifang municipal government): 36°42′29″N 119°09′43″E
- Country: People's Republic of China
- Province: Shandong
- Municipal seat: Kuiwen District
- Subdivisions: List: Districts; Weicheng; Kuiwen; Fangzi; Hanting; County-level cities; Qingzhou; Zhucheng; Shouguang; Anqiu; Gaomi; Changyi; County; Changle; Linqu

Government
  - Party Secretary: Liu Yun
  - Mayor: Liu Jianjun

Area
  - Prefecture-level city: 16,143.14 km^{2} (6,232.90 sq mi)
  - Urban: 2,646.1 km^{2} (1,021.7 sq mi)
  - Metro: 3,746.6 km^{2} (1,446.6 sq mi)
- Elevation: 32 m (105 ft)

Population (2020 census)
  - Prefecture-level city: 9,386,705
  - Density: 581.4671/km^{2} (1,505.993/sq mi)
  - Urban: 2,511,721
  - Urban density: 949.22/km^{2} (2,458.5/sq mi)
  - Metro: 3,095,520
  - Metro density: 826.22/km^{2} (2,139.9/sq mi)
  - Major nationalities: Han Chinese

GDP
  - Prefecture-level city: CN¥ 820 billion US$ 115 billion
  - Per capita: CN¥ 87,392; US$ 12,271
- Time zone: UTC+8 (China Standard)
- Postal code: 261000 (Urban center); 261300, 261500, 262100, 262200, 262400-262700 (Other areas)
- Area code: 536
- ISO 3166 code: CN-SD-07
- License plate prefixes: 鲁G & 鲁V
- Coastline: 113 kilometres (70 mi)
- Website: http://www.weifang.gov.cn/

Weifang (simplified Chinese: 潍坊; traditional Chinese: 濰坊; pinyin: Wéifāng) is a prefecture-level city in central Shandong province, People's Republic of China. The city borders Dongying to the northwest, Zibo to the west, Linyi to the southwest, Rizhao to the south, Qingdao to the east, and looks out to the Laizhou Bay to the north. Its population was 9,386,705 at the 2020 census, of whom 3,095,520 lived in the built-up (or metro) area made up of four urban districts (Kuiwen, Weicheng, Hanting and Fangzi) and Changle County.

Weifang has numerous natural and historic sites, such as Shihu Garden (from the Late Ming and early Qing dynasty), Fangong Pavilion (from the Song dynasty), fossil sites (including dinosaur fossils, in Shanwang, Linqu), Mount Yi National Forest Park, Mount Qingyun and the Old Dragon Spring. Painted New Year woodcuts from Yangjiabu are also well-known. The city is served by Weifang Airport to various cities across China.

== Administration ==
The prefecture-level city of Weifang administers 12 county-level divisions, including four districts, six county-level cities, and two counties.Weifang City governs 4 districts: Kuiwen, Weicheng, Hanting, and Fangzi; 6 county-level cities: Qingzhou, Zhucheng, Shouguang, Anqiu, Gaomi, and Changyi; and 2 counties: Linqu and Changle. County-level cities are at the same level as counties, so there are 12 districts and counties. In addition, there are 59 streets and 59 towns in the city. The residents are mainly Han, with 50 ethnic minorities including Hui and Manchu.Weifang Municipal Government is located in Weifang City, Kuiwen District, No. 99 Shengli East Street.

Map
Subdivision	Chinese	Pinyin
Weicheng District	潍城区	Wéichéng Qū
Hanting District	寒亭区	Hántíng Qū
Fangzi District	坊子区	Fāngzǐ Qū
Kuiwen District	奎文区	Kuǐwén Qū
Linqu County	临朐县	Línqú Xiàn
Changle County	昌乐县	Chānglè Xiàn
Qingzhou	青州市	Qīngzhōu Shì
Zhucheng	诸城市	Zhūchéng Shì
Shouguang	寿光市	Shòuguāng Shì
Anqiu	安丘市	Ānqiū Shì
Gaomi	高密市	Gāomì Shì
Changyi	昌邑市	Chāngyì Shì

== Geography ==
Nearby major cities include Jinan and Zibo to the west, Yantai to the northeast and Qingdao to the southeast.Weifang is high in the south and low in the north. The south is a low hilly area with dense forests and rich vegetation. Alluvial rivers in the central part form alluvial and alluvial plain areas, and the northern part is the coastal area with vast coastal beaches. There are six major rivers such as Wei River and Bailang River flowing through it.

=== Climate ===
Weifang has a monsoon-influenced, four-season humid continental climate (Köppen Dwa), with hot, humid summers, and cold but dry winters. Monthly daily average temperatures range from −2.8 °C (27.0 °F) in January to 26.3 °C (79.3 °F) in July, and the annual mean is 12.71 °C (54.9 °F). More than 70% of the annual precipitation occurs from June to September, and sunshine is generally abundant year-round. A majority of the annual precipitation occurs in July and August alone. With monthly percent possible sunshine ranging from 47% in July to 62% in April, the city receives 2,536 hours of bright sunshine annually, sunshine is abundant except during the summer months.

Climate data for Weifang, elevation 22 m (72 ft), (1991–2020 normals, extremes 1951–present)
Month	Jan	Feb	Mar	Apr	May	Jun	Jul	Aug	Sep	Oct	Nov	Dec	Year
Record high °C (°F)	19.8 (67.6)	27.8 (82.0)	31.5 (88.7)	36.3 (97.3)	40.7 (105.3)	41.4 (106.5)	41.2 (106.2)	40.5 (104.9)	39.0 (102.2)	35.8 (96.4)	26.3 (79.3)	22.6 (72.7)	41.4 (106.5)
Mean daily maximum °C (°F)	3.5 (38.3)	7.1 (44.8)	13.6 (56.5)	20.4 (68.7)	26.1 (79.0)	30.3 (86.5)	31.6 (88.9)	30.4 (86.7)	27.0 (80.6)	21.1 (70.0)	12.8 (55.0)	5.7 (42.3)	19.1 (66.4)
Daily mean °C (°F)	−2.3 (27.9)	0.8 (33.4)	6.7 (44.1)	13.6 (56.5)	19.6 (67.3)	24.1 (75.4)	26.7 (80.1)	25.6 (78.1)	21.2 (70.2)	14.7 (58.5)	6.8 (44.2)	0.0 (32.0)	13.1 (55.6)
Mean daily minimum °C (°F)	−6.6 (20.1)	−4.2 (24.4)	1.0 (33.8)	7.4 (45.3)	13.4 (56.1)	18.6 (65.5)	22.5 (72.5)	21.7 (71.1)	16.2 (61.2)	9.5 (49.1)	2.0 (35.6)	−4.2 (24.4)	8.1 (46.6)
Record low °C (°F)	−21.4 (−6.5)	−17.9 (−0.2)	−12.9 (8.8)	−6.8 (19.8)	0.9 (33.6)	6.3 (43.3)	12.9 (55.2)	11.5 (52.7)	3.7 (38.7)	−4.3 (24.3)	−12.7 (9.1)	−16.5 (2.3)	−21.4 (−6.5)
Average precipitation mm (inches)	6.4 (0.25)	12.7 (0.50)	12.8 (0.50)	27.9 (1.10)	48.7 (1.92)	76.9 (3.03)	131.1 (5.16)	160.0 (6.30)	52.9 (2.08)	28.1 (1.11)	26.6 (1.05)	10.3 (0.41)	594.4 (23.41)
Average precipitation days (≥ 0.1 mm)	2.9	3.2	3.3	5.3	6.6	7.7	11.4	11.5	6.0	5.2	4.6	3.9	71.6
Average snowy days	3.8	3.5	1.3	0.1	0	0	0	0	0	0	0.8	2.7	12.2
Average relative humidity (%)	64	61	56	58	62	66	77	80	73	68	67	64	66
Mean monthly sunshine hours	166.1	167.9	218.0	234.6	258.7	224.9	192.2	193.5	202.7	197.5	165.6	165.6	2,387.3
Percentage possible sunshine	54	55	58	59	59	51	43	47	55	57	55	55	54
Source: China Meteorological AdministrationNOAA all-time extreme temperature

== Economy ==
The city is home to the large diesel engine company and factory Weichai, and Shengrui Transmission manufacturer. The village of Yangjiabu in Hanting District is famous for folk wood-block print (nianhua) and kite production.

In the 1980s, many sapphire deposits were discovered in Changle County. According to released information, billions of carats of sapphire are estimated to lie under an area of 450 km^{2} (170 sq mi). Mining here has become one of the top four sapphire producers in the world. The main feature of this sapphire is the dark blue or close to black color because of the high iron content.

Established in August 1995, the Weifang Binhai Economic & Technological Development Area (BEDA) is a national economic and technological development area approved by the State Council. Covering an area of 677 km^{2} (261 sq mi), BEDA has a population of 100,000. BEDA possesses a large state-owned industrial land for use with an area of 400 km^{2} (150 sq mi). BEDA has been accredited as a National Demonstration Zone invigorating the Sea by Science and Technology, National Innovation Base for Rejuvenating Trade through Science and Technology and National Demonstration Eco-Industry Park.

Weifang is an important economic center of Shandong Province, with numerous shopping centers. Fangzi Taihua City, located in Fangzi District, Weifang City, was built by Shandong Century Taihua Group with a construction area of about 130,000 square meters and equipped with 1,200 parking spaces. It officially opened on September 17, 2021.

Notable enterprises headquartered in Weifang include Weichai Power, Shandong Weifang Runfeng Chemical, and Bank of Weifang.

== Military ==
Weifang is the headquarters of the 26th Group Army of the People's Liberation Army, one of the three group armies that comprise the Jinan Military Region responsible for defense of the Yellow River Plain.

== History ==
Weifang has a long history. According to archaeological discoveries, there are more than 1,800 ancient cultural sites in different times in China. Among them, the first Beixin cultural relic in eastern Shandong was found in taoyuan village, Qingzhou; The ancient castle site of Longshan culture excavated by Shouguang Bianxian Wang is rare in China. The typical Longshan cultural site in Yaoguanzhuang, Weicheng District is rich in unearthed relics, far exceeding the excavation of Chengziya site before liberation.

Historical texts record that during the Xia and Shang dynasties, the feudal states of Zhenguan (斟灌), Han (寒), and Wangshou (王寿) were based in the area. At the beginning of the Zhou dynasty, King Wu enfeoffed Jiang Ziya as Duke Tai of Qi, with Yingqiu (now in Changle) as the capital. During the Spring and Autumn period, the present municipal district belonged to Qi, Lu, Lai, Qi, Ju and other states. During the Warring States period, most of the current ministries were in harmony, and Wulian and Zhucheng belonged to Shandong.

As early as the Neolithic Age, there were ancestors living next to the old roads of Weihe River and Mihe River in Weifang. The ancient tribal people living here are called "Dongyi people". They have created a rich and colorful Dongyi culture, which is one of the sources of Chinese civilization.

During the Eastern Zhou dynasty, Weifang belonged to the same land, bordering the Bohai Sea in the north, and it had the advantage of "fish and salt". Counties were established in Qin dynasty, and most of Weifang belonged to Jiaodong County, Qi County and Langya County. In the fifth year of Emperor Yuan Feng of the Han dynasty (106 BC), Qingzhou Secretariat Department was established, which was located in Guang County (located in Qingzhou today). During the Sixteen Kingdoms period of the Eastern Jin dynasty, Murong De, a Xianbei people, established the Southern Yan regime, whose capital was located in Guanggu City (now Qingzhou City, Weifang), and in the 16th year of Emperor Kai of Sui dynasty (596), it was located in Weizhou.

During this period, as one of the earliest areas where Buddhism was introduced into the Han dynasty, Weifang became the center of Buddhism in Qilu, leaving a large number of Buddhist cultural relics, such as the hoard of Buddhist statues in longxing temple, Qingzhou and Tuoshan, and the statues in Yunmen Mountain and Shimenfang Grottoes.

In modern times, some famous events have taken place, such as the Weixian Uprising, the Weixian Campaign, etc.

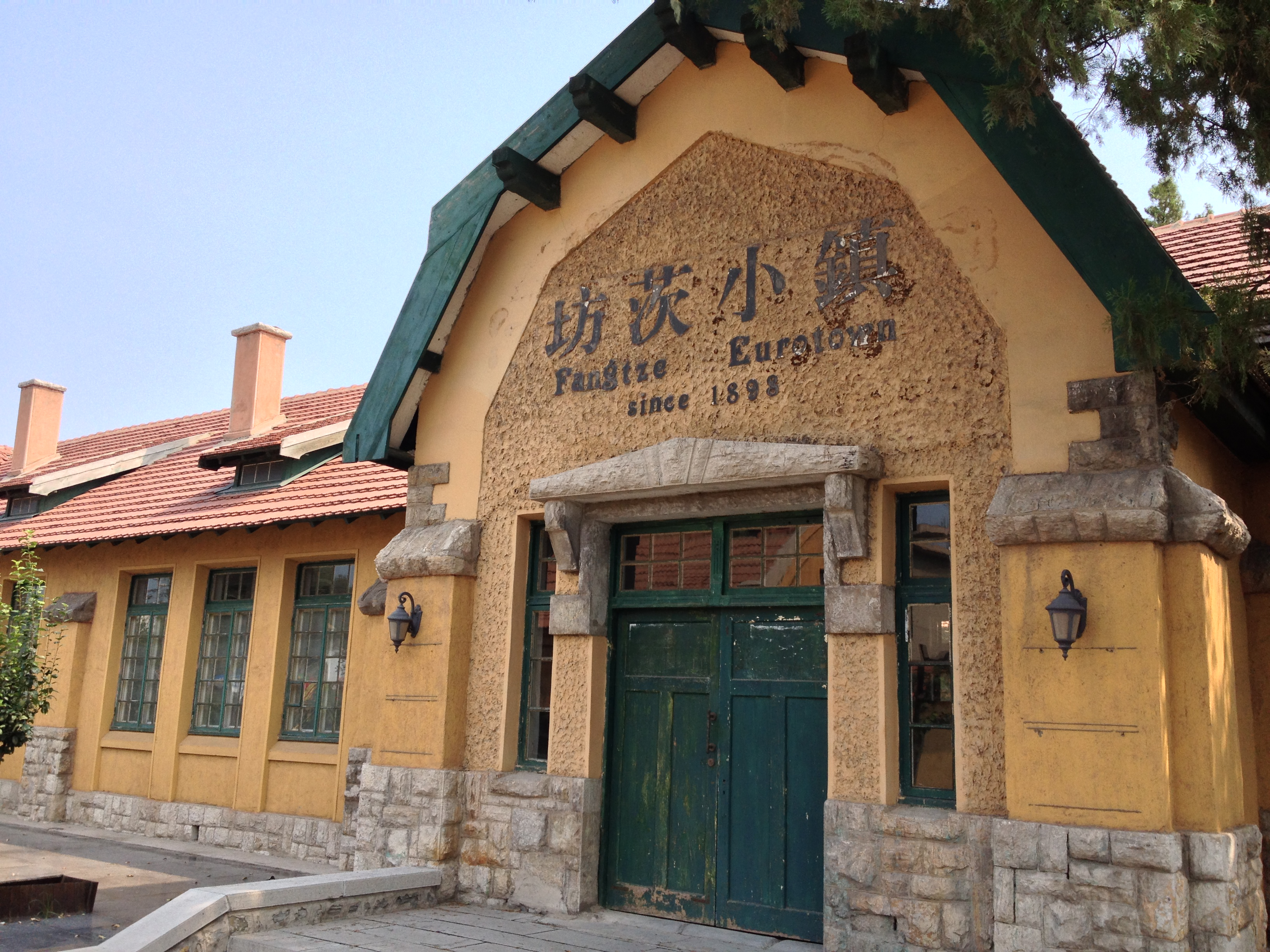
A historic German train station in Euro Town, Weifang

== Culture ==
=== Kite flying ===
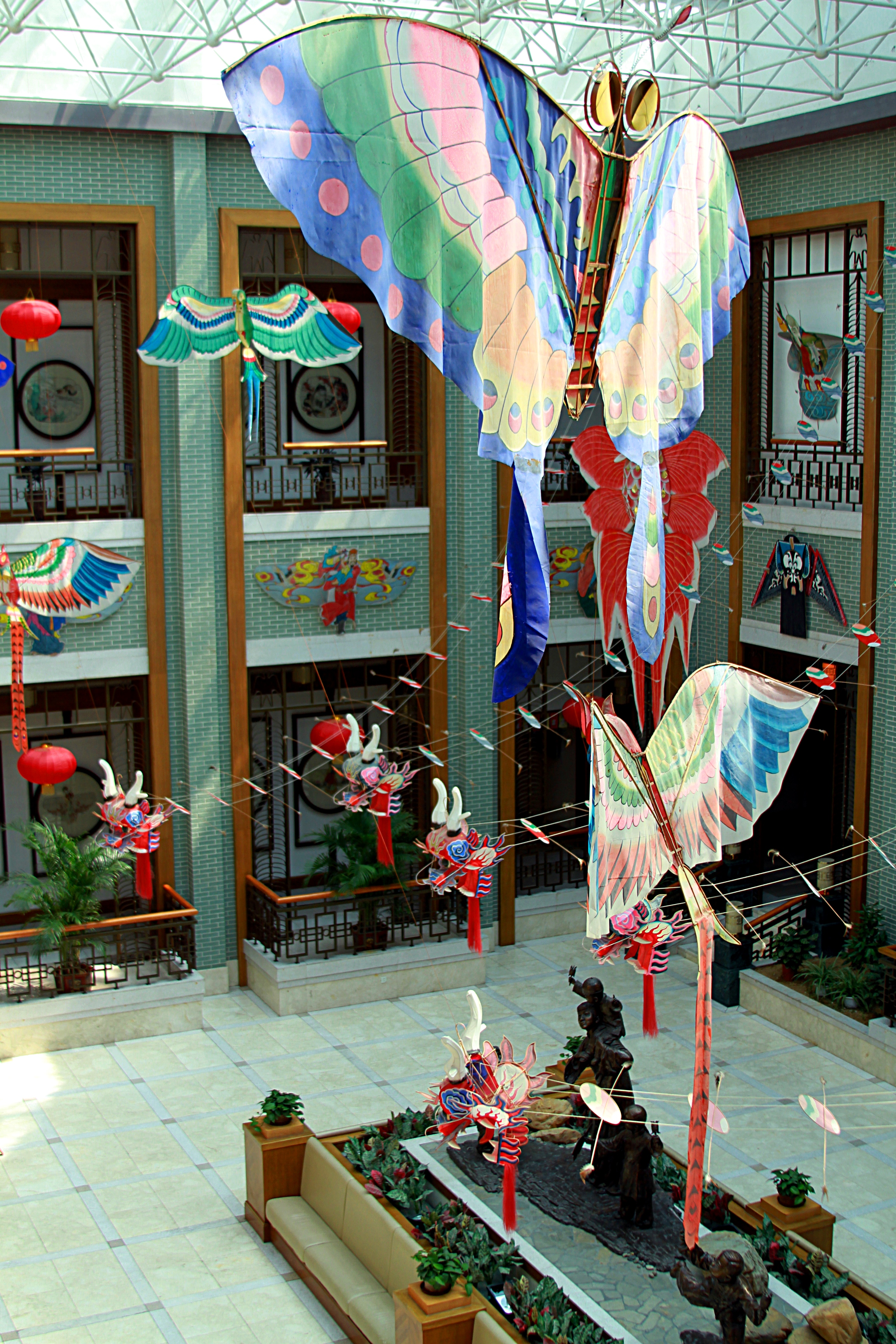
Kite Museum in Weifang

As early as the 1930s, Weifang had held a kite festival. Kite flying is a traditional custom among the people in Weifang in spring time. In 1984, the first international kite festival was held in Weifang. More than ten thousand kite fans attended the opening ceremony. People from eleven countries and regions, including the United States and Canada, took part in the festival, flying kites. Since then, Weifang holds the Weifang International Kite Festival each year. It is held each April.

=== Painting ===
Annual Board of Yangjiabu (楊家埠木版年畫), one of the three most famous Chinese folk paintings in history, began from the end of the Ming dynasty. It reached the peak of its development during the Qing dynasty. People usually replace the old Annual Broads with the new ones on the eve of Spring Festival, which is the most important festival in China, in order to give blessings to the family and friends for the following year. The subjects of Annual Board of Yangjiabu are various, which include flowers, beauties, landscapes, characters from myths and legends. The architecture skills such as concise lines and bright colors reflect the distinctive characteristics of people in Weifang.

=== Papercutting ===
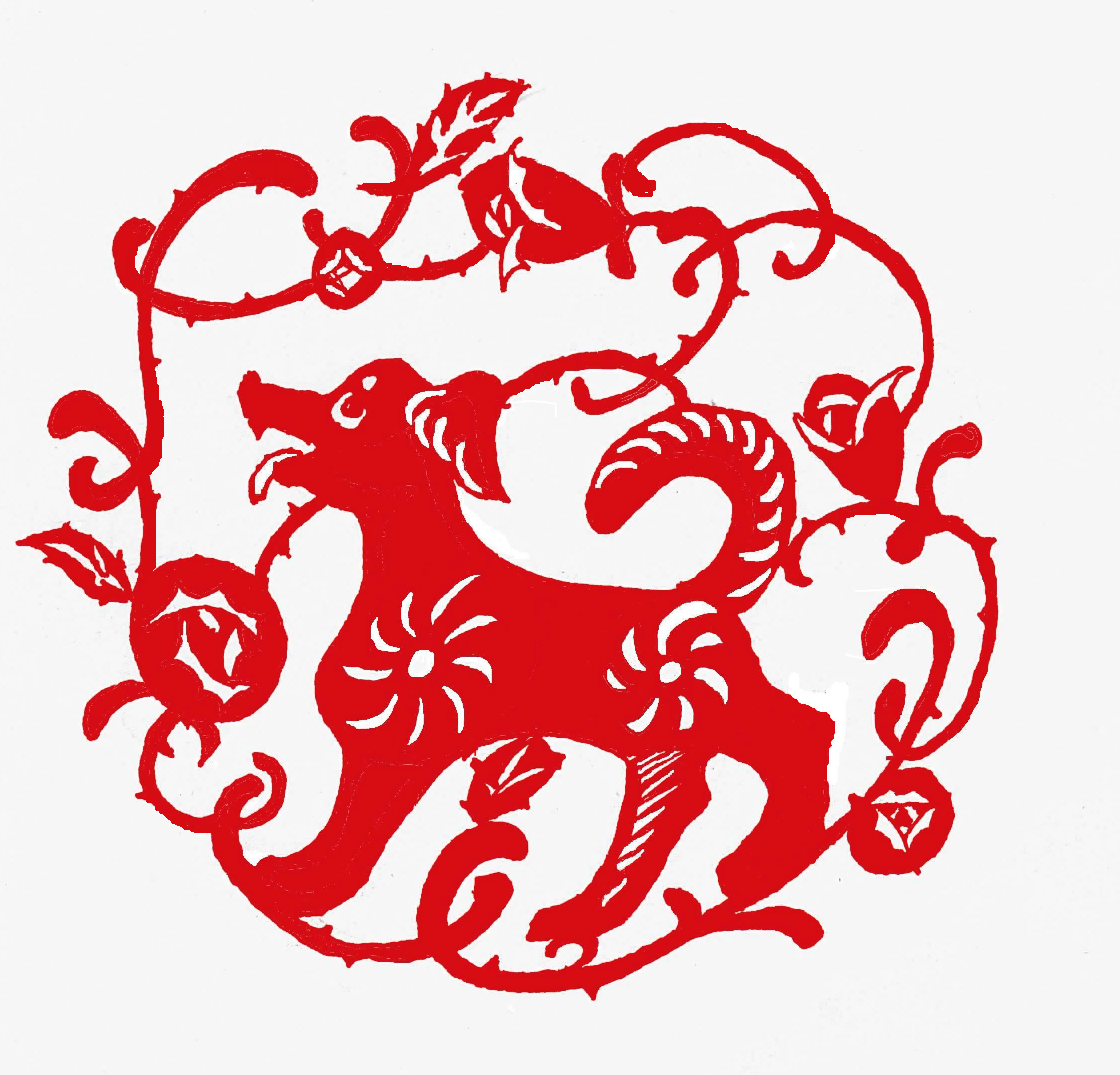
Chinese papercutting, in a style that is practically identical to the original 6th century form

Papercutting, the art of cutting paper designs, has a long history in the city of Gaomi.Weifang paper-cutting is a UNESCO intangible cultural heritage item. Among them, the paper-cutting in the Gaomi area was first used as a faction of Jiaodong paper-cutting and has initially developed a delicate style. This widespread handicraft has unique styles, such as strong contrast in color, straight and simple line and exaggerated outline. The characters mostly come from the dramatic stories, flowers and birds, as well as some fantastic symbols.

=== Chinese New Year picture made of painted ash ===
Gaomi ash New Year's paintings (高密扑灰年画) are an ancient type of Chinese folk art, which first appeared in the Ming dynasty during the Chenghua period and flourished in the Qing dynasty.

On 20 May 2006, GaoMi ash New Year paintings were approved by the State Council to be included in the first batch of national intangible cultural heritage list. On October 31, 2023, the "national intangible cultural heritage representative project protection unit list" was announced, the original protection unit of the project there are significant changes in the nature of the unit, institutions and other aspects, does not have the basic conditions of the protection unit and so on, re-identified as the protection unit of gaomi city public cultural service centre.

=== Cuisine ===
There are three dishes representative of Weifang:

- Ji-Ya Hele (鸡鸭和乐) Weifang Ji-Ya Hele is said to have originated in Shanxi province. Later on, it was brought to Weifang. The name "Hele" (和乐), a kind of noodle, was developed from the word "Helou" (河漏), a noodle name once used in history. Weifang Ji-Ya Hele is cooked with various ingredients, stewed with chicken and duck soup. To make delicious "Hele" Noodles, we need to put the "Hele" noodles into the pot. After it is fully boiled, chicken, duck, Sliced Meatball, salted vegetables or spicy oil is added into the noodles. In 1997, Ji-Ya Hele was honored as a "Chinese Famous Snack" by China Cuisine Association.
- Rou Huo Shao (肉火烧; 'meat pie') Meat Pie is the most famous cuisine in Weifang. Weifang Meat Pie has a long history and variety. "Mirror" recorded in Han Zhao Qi people living in the North Sea (i.e. Weifang) to sell Weifang Meat pie for a living. This is an example of an earlier business written records since the Meat pIe. Whether it is in the morning or at noon, in front of the shop is always a long row waiting for the pie. The shop is generally build along the street. Bite, coke dough rattling, in a high temperature furnace after repeatedly turning roast, pork moisten the green onion, egg, chopped dried shrimps fillings inside, aroma, mouth-watering produce the feeling, entrance juicy, full taste, people aftertaste. The most important technique in the process of making Weifang pork roast is roasting, three-quarter buns, and seven-cent roasting. If the fire is low, the meat will be dried out, if the fire is high, it will be simmered. Be sure to use medium heat for baking. Next, use warm water to mix the noodles, and the filling should be flavorful. Add chicken cakes, fungus, chopped green onions, etc. together with fresh pork belly to make the meat taste richer and more fragrant when grilled.
- Chao Tian Guo (朝天锅). Chao Tian Guo is a local specialty of Weifang. This food is known as created by Zheng Banqiao during the Qianlong period of the Qing dynasty. The main materials of Chao Tian Guo is thin pancake, meat ball, pig offal, tofu, and soy with the soup. The merchants use a huge pot to cook these materials and the customers can sit around this pot. The reason why it called Chao Tian Guo is "Chao Tian" in Chinese means the pot has no cover and the pot is facing to the sky ("Guo" in Chinese is means pot). Because the earthen pot has no lid, people jokingly call it "chaotian pot", and Weifang people also call it "chop suey pot".

== Education ==
There are 9 universities and colleges in Weifang, namely Shandong University of Science and Technology Weifang Campus, Weifang College, Weifang Medical College, Shandong Technology and Business College, Shandong University of Traditional Chinese Medicine Weifang Campus, Weifang Vocational College, Shandong Jiaotong University Weifang Campus, Weifang Science and Technology Vocational College College and Weifang Nursing Vocational College.

Among them, Weifang Campus of Shandong University of Science and Technology is the only comprehensive university in Weifang, which was founded in 1951 and is a high-level university supported by Shandong Province. The school covers an area of about 167 hectares (410 acres) and has 16 colleges, covering engineering, science, management, literature, law, education, art, life science, agricultural science, medicine and other disciplines.

In addition to Weifang Campus of Shandong University of Science and Technology, there are many undergraduate colleges and vocational colleges in Weifang, such as Weifang College, Shandong Institute of Business and Technology, and Weifang Campus of Shandong University of Traditional Chinese Medicine.

Weifang University and Weifang Medical University are universities in the city. On 28 December 2023, Weifang Medical University formally changed its name to Shandong Second Medical University.

== Notable people ==
- Zheng Xuan (127–200), Eastern Han dynasty Confucian scholar
- Liu Yong (1719–1805), renowned Qing dynasty bureaucrat
- Mo Yan (born 1955), real named Guan Moye, renowned writer, awarded Nobel Prize for Literature in 2012
- Wang Xiaoyun (born 1966), cryptographer, mathematician, and computer scientist
- Sun Feifei (born 1989), fashion model
- Emperor Shun of the Three Sovereigns and Five Emperors period
- Yan Ying (c. 578–500 BC), Spring and Autumn period politician
- Wei-Wen Yu (1923–2026), civil engineer
- Jia Sixie, Northern Wei dynasty agriculturist. He wrote the agricultural science and technology masterpiece 'Qi Min Yao Shu'.The 'Qi Min Yao Shu' is the earliest book on agriculture in China.

In addition, Kong Rong, Fan Zhongyan, Ouyang Xiu, Su Dongpo, Zheng Banqiao, et al. have worked in Weifang historically. Examples of notable individuals from the city in more recent years include Wang Jinmei, Chen Shaomin, and Zang Kejia.

== Demographics ==
According to the Seventh National Census in 2020, the city's Permanent Population (hukou) was 9,386,705.

Compared with 9,086,241 people in the Sixth National Census in 2010, the population has increased by 300,464 over the past ten years, representing a growth of 3.31%, with an average annual growth rate of 0.33%.

Among the total population of the city, the male population is 4,772,791, accounting for 50.85%. The female population is 4,613,914, accounting for 49.15%. The sex ratio of the total population (with females as 100, the ratio of males to females) was 103.44, an increase of 0.88 percentage points compared with 102.56 in the Sixth National Census in 2010.
