= Kuan =

Kuan may refer to:

Ethnic groups

- Khuen people, an aboriginal people of Laos
- Khün, a Tai ethnic group in southeast Asia

Other uses

- Fan Kuan (990–1020), Chinese landscape painter of the Song dynasty
- Lee Kuan Yew (1923–2015), founding father of Singapore, prime minister 1959–1990
- Agam Kuan, an ancient well in India
- Dhaula Kuan, major intersection of roads in Delhi, India

Television

- KUAN-LD, a low-power television station (channel 17, virtual 48) licensed to serve Poway, etc., California, United States

== See also ==
- Guan (disambiguation)
- Guang (disambiguation)
