= Zang Kejia =

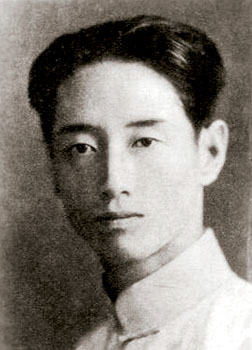
- Zang Kejia in 1933 in Qingdao
- Born: 8 October 1905; Zhucheng, Shandong, Qing Empire
- Died: 5 February 2004 (aged 98); Beijing, People's Republic of China
- Education: Shandong Provincial First Normal School; Wuhan Branch of the Central Military and Political School; Qingdao University
- Children: Zang Liyuan 臧樂源; Zang Lian 臧樂安; Zang Xiaoping 臧小平

Zang Kejia (Chinese: 臧克家; pinyin: Zāng Kèjiā; 8 October 1905 – 5 February 2004) was a Chinese poet.

He was born in Zhucheng, Shandong province. Zang entered the Shandong Provincial First Normal School in 1923 and later trained at the Wuhan Branch of the Central Military and Political School.

In 1929, he went to Qingdao University, and under the guidance of Wen Yiduo began publishing poetry. His first collection, Laoyin (Brand) appeared in 1937. Other collections followed.

With the outbreak of the Second Sino-Japanese War, Zang did cultural propaganda work for the army, and collections of his were published as well as volumes of army poetry. After the war, he was involved in editorial activities and published his first collection of short stories and prose.

After the founding of the People's Republic of China, he held several important positions, among them as chief editor of Poetry magazine. He also co-edited the "Selected Poems of Chairman Mao" with Zhou Zhenfu.
