= Prince Guang =

Prince Guang or Kuang may refer to:

- Helü, King of Wu, was Prince Guang before ascending the throne
- Duke Zhuang II of Qi, was Prince Guang before ascending the throne
