= Dong Guangping =

Chinese human rights activist (born 1958)

Dong Guangping (simplified Chinese: 董广平; traditional Chinese: 董廣平; pinyin: Dǒng Guǎngpíng; born 13 April 1958) is a Chinese human rights activist who attempted to emigrate to the West but disappeared in 2022 in Vietnam and was imprisoned in China. In 2026 he sailed to South Korea in an inflatable boat, where he was held by authorities before being allowed to resettle in Canada with his family.

== Early life ==
Dong Guangping was born in Zhengzhou, China, in 1958 to a father who was a military general. He grew up in a wealthy family and his brothers joined the armed forces and became colonels.

== Career ==
Dong worked as a police inspector and a soldier before becoming a human-rights activist. He was fired from the police force in 1999 for signing a letter about the 1989 Tiananmen Square protests and massacre, before being jailed for three years. He is known in China for speaking out against China's censorship of news about the Tiananmen Square protests and massacre. Dong was taken from a Thai immigration centre by Chinese police in 2015 while he was attempting to resettle to Canada. The police returned him to China where he was jailed for three years. After his release he attempted to swim to Taiwanese territory but foundered, was rescued by passing fishermen and returned to mainland China.

He fled China for Vietnam in 2020. Dong was arrested in Hanoi by Vietnamese authorities August 22, 2022. Canada offered him political asylum. The Vietnamese government declined to release any information about his whereabouts. In October 2023 independent human rights monitors reported he had been released from a Chinese prison after an 11-month sentence for "illegal border crossing."

In May 2026 he was detained by South Korea for illegal entry after crossing open seas from China in an inflatable boat. He was inspired by Kwon Pyong's similar journey in 2023. Human rights activists called on South Korea to ensure he was not returned to China and to allow him to reunite with his family, as it is expected China will try to use diplomatic pressure to get Korea to return Guangping to China, as it likely did earlier with Vietnam.

On 28 May 2026, the Daejeon District Court rejected a detention warrant request for Dong Guangping, ruling that there was insufficient evidence of flight risk or destruction of evidence. Following the decision, his case was transferred to immigration authorities. One month later, Sheng Xue confirmed that he was able to travel to Canada to live with his wife and daughter who had already been resettled there.

== Personal life ==
Dong's daughter Katherine Dong and family live in Canada, where they relocated in 2015.

== See also ==
- Enforced disappearance
- China–South Korea relations
- China–Vietnam relations
