= Dongguan Street (Yangzhou) =

Street in Yangzhou, Jiangsu, China

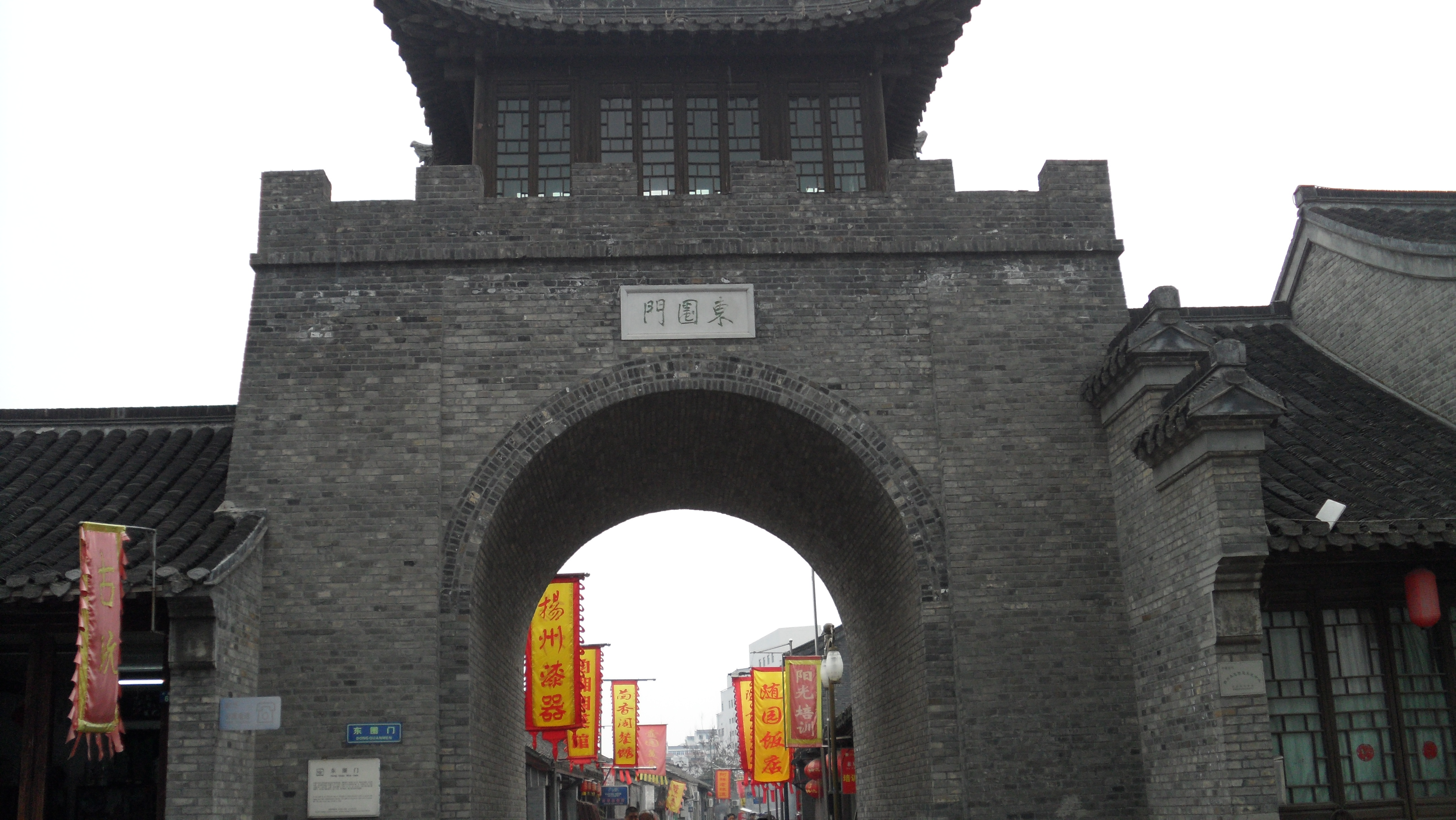
Dongguan Street

Dongguan Street is an ancient street in Dongguan Subdistrict, Guangling District, Yangzhou, Jiangsu, China.

== Location ==
It is surrounded by many building so that it's discreet but it has two grand gates standing in two ends of the street. Dongguan Street is east of the Grand Canal and west of the Guoqing Road (国庆路, National Day Road).

== Introduction ==
It is 1122 meters long and paved with slates. In the past, it was not only the water and land transportation route in Yangzhou, but also a commercial and cultural center. Dongguan Street is linked to the Dongquanmen. Two blocks have been combined to plan, renovate, develop and become the highlights of Yangzhou. There are many shops here that are old and a large number of monuments and heritages. Everything here maintains the characteristics of the Ming and Qing Dynasty.

== Awards and influence ==
In 2010, it was selected as one of "10 Famous Historical and Cultural Streets" by a national program which evaluates streets on their historic importance, cultural significance, preservation, economic vitality, social visibility, and protection and management.
