= Quan =

Quán is the Pinyin romanization of the Chinese family names 權/权 and 全, as well as a customary spelling of 關 (pinyin: Guān). All written forms of the name are rare enough that they do not appear in the list of the 100 most common Chinese surnames.

== 權 ==
Quan (traditional Chinese: 權; simplified Chinese: 权; pinyin: Quán) is a Chinese surname. A notable with the surname Quan surname was Quan Deyu, who was born in 759 during the reign of Emperor Suzong. His family claimed to descend from the Later Qin official Quan Yi (權翼). His family tree was from the Sui dynasty official Quan Rong (權榮).

During the Shang dynasty, the Quan family founded the state of Quan (權國). In the state of Chu, the Xiong family lived in Quan County (權縣), and took the surname Quan.

== 全 ==
Quan (Chinese: 全; pinyin: Quán), is a Chinese family name. Liang and Yang in alternative Mandarin are other spellings. The character 全 is rendered as Jeon in Korean and is one of several Chinese characters for the common Korean surname Jeon (Chun). The character 全 is rendered as Toàn in Vietnamese. The name is spelled Chuan in Taiwan, based on the Wade–Giles romanization system. Quan Cong was a military general of Eastern Wu during the Three Kingdoms, while Quan Huijie (全惠解) the Empress Quan (全) was empress of Eastern Wu.

The Quan (全) family was founded with this public, official name. During ancient times, Quandi (全地) was the old regional name, where people would get the surname Quan (全). The Yuan dynasty and Wan Quan (万全) are nomadic people, who get the surname Quan (全) with their given name.

== 關 ==
Quan (Chinese: 關) is the Sino-Vietnamese reading of the Chinese surname spelled Guān in Pinyin, as well as a customary non-systemic spelling of its pronunciation in different varieties of Chinese (including Mandarin, Cantonese, and Hakka). The spelling Quan can be found among overseas Chinese communities in Vietnam and Anglophone countries. In Hong Kong, the same surname is more commonly spelled Kwan, while people in Taiwan often use the Wade-Giles spelling Kuan.

== Notable people with the surname ==
- Quan Lei (權), Chinese footballer
- Quan Yi Fong (權), Taiwanese actress
- Quan Hansheng (全), Chinese economic historian
- Quan Hongchan (全), Chinese diver
- Jean Quan (關), American politician
- Ke Huy Quan (關), American actor and stunt coordinator
- Andy Quan, Canadian author living in Sydney, Australia
- Dionne Quan, American voice actress
- Donald Quan, Canadian composer of film and world music
- Katie Quan, American labor organizer and researcher
- Tracy Quan, American writer and former call girl

== Notable people with the given name or nickname ==
- Quan (rapper), American rapper
- Quan Bray, American football player
- Quan Martin, American football player
- Quan Sturdivant, American football player
- Quan Yeomans, Australian musician
- Rich Homie Quan, American rapper

== Prominent fictional characters with the name ==
- Evelyn Quan Wang, the main character of the Oscar-winning 2022 film Everything Everywhere All At Once
- Quan, a playable character in Generation I from Fire Emblem: Seisen no Keifu. The prince of Leonster, father of Leif and Altena, husband of Ethlyn, and brother-in-law of Sigurd
- Quan Chi, a sorcerer in Mortal Kombat

== See also ==
- Quanrong, an ethnic group of northwestern China during the Zhou dynasty
- List of common Chinese surnames
- List of common Taiwanese surnames
- Quan (disambiguation)
