= Fangzi, Weifang =

Coordinates: 36°39′22″N 119°09′58″E

Fangzi District 坊子区 Fangtze
- District
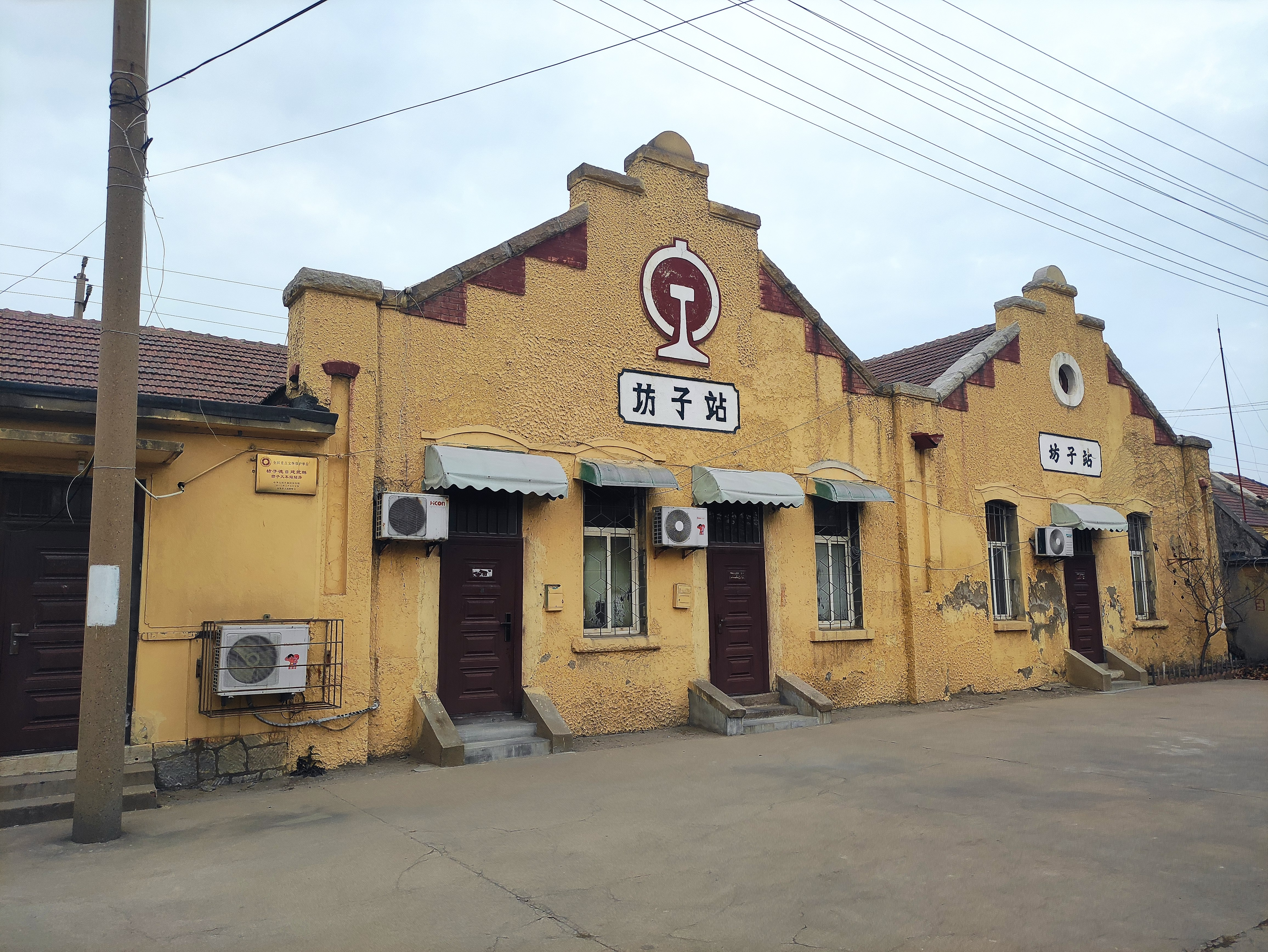
- Fangzi Railway Station

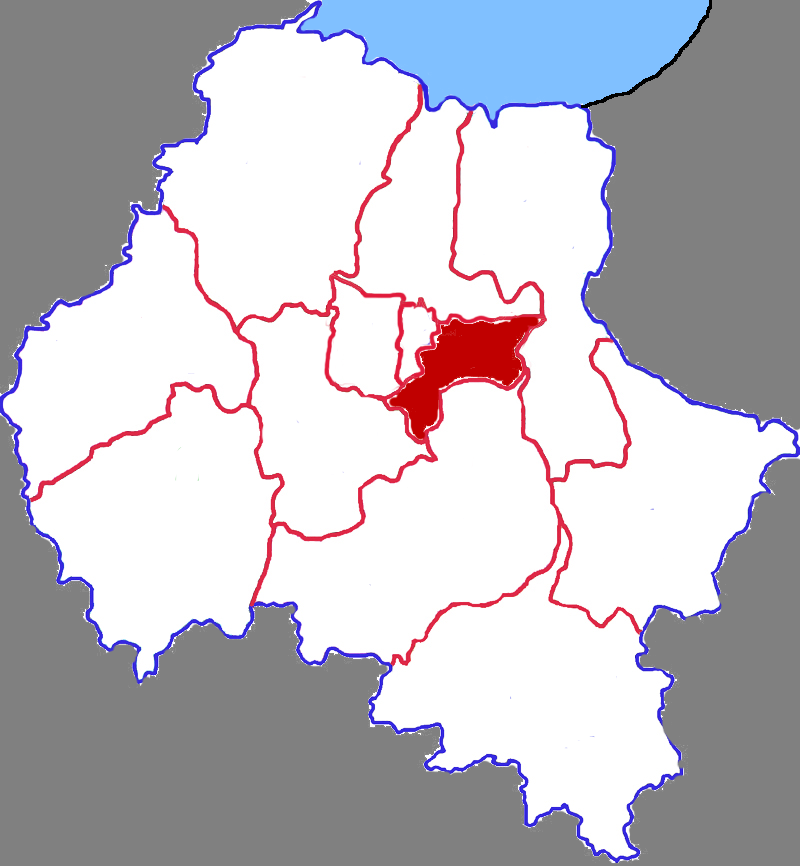
- Location in Weifang

- Location in Shandong
- Country: People's Republic of China
- Province: Shandong
- Prefecture-level city: Weifang

Area
  - Total: 412 km^{2} (159 sq mi)

Population (2018)
  - Total: 325,000
  - Density: 789/km^{2} (2,040/sq mi)
- Time zone: UTC+8 (China Standard)
- Postal code: 261200
- Division code: FZQ
- Website: www.fangzi.gov.cn/portal.php

Fangzi (Chinese: 坊子区; Chinese: 坊子區; pinyin: Fāngzǐ Qū) is a district of the city of Weifang, Shandong province, China. It has an area of 345.55 km^{2} (133.42 sq mi) and Fangzi District has a household population of 331,100 and a resident population of 362,900 (2021).

== Administrative divisions ==
As of 2012, this district is divided to 4 sub-districts and 2 towns.

Subdistricts

- Fenghuang Subdistrict (凤凰街道)
- Fang'an Subdistrict (坊安街道)
- Fangcheng Subdistrict (坊城街道)
- Jiulong Subdistrict (九龙街道)

Towns

- Huangqibao (黄旗堡镇)
- Taibaozhuang (太保庄镇)
