= Anqiu =

Anqiu 安丘市 Ankiu
- County-level city
- Location in Shandong
- Coordinates: 36.478°N 119.219°E
- Country: People's Republic of China
- Province: Shandong
- Prefecture-level city: Weifang

Area
  - Total: 1,760 km^{2} (680 sq mi)

Population (2019)
  - Total: 962,000
- Time zone: UTC+8 (China Standard)
- Postal code: 262100

Anqiu (simplified Chinese: 安丘; traditional Chinese: 安邱; pinyin: Ānqiū) is a county-level city under the jurisdiction of Weifang in the south of Shandong province, China.

The population at the 2010 census was 926,900 even though the built-up area is much smaller.

Part of the Great Wall of Qi begins here, and is listed on the People's Republic of China's list of historical artifacts.

== Administrative divisions ==
As of 2012, this city is divided to 2 subdistricts and 11 towns.

Subdistricts

- Xing'an Subdistrict (兴安街道)
- Xin'an Subdistrict (新安街道)

Towns

- Jingzhi (景芝镇)
- Linghe (凌河镇)
- Guanzhuang (官庄镇)
- Dasheng (大盛镇)
- Zhaoge (赵戈镇)
- Shibuzi (石埠子镇)
- Shidui (石堆镇)
- Zheshan (柘山镇)
- Huiliang (辉渠镇)
- Wushan (吾山镇)
- Jinzhongzi (金冢子镇)

== Climate ==
Climate data for Anqiu, elevation 63 m (207 ft), (1991–2020 normals, extremes 1981–present)
Month	Jan	Feb	Mar	Apr	May	Jun	Jul	Aug	Sep	Oct	Nov	Dec	Year
Record high °C (°F)	17.1 (62.8)	24.2 (75.6)	31.3 (88.3)	34.7 (94.5)	37.6 (99.7)	40.4 (104.7)	39.6 (103.3)	37.8 (100.0)	38.9 (102.0)	34.6 (94.3)	27.2 (81.0)	20.0 (68.0)	40.4 (104.7)
Mean daily maximum °C (°F)	3.7 (38.7)	7.2 (45.0)	13.7 (56.7)	20.5 (68.9)	26.0 (78.8)	29.9 (85.8)	31.3 (88.3)	30.2 (86.4)	26.8 (80.2)	20.9 (69.6)	12.9 (55.2)	5.8 (42.4)	19.1 (66.3)
Daily mean °C (°F)	−2.1 (28.2)	1.0 (33.8)	6.9 (44.4)	13.8 (56.8)	19.5 (67.1)	23.8 (74.8)	26.4 (79.5)	25.4 (77.7)	20.9 (69.6)	14.4 (57.9)	6.8 (44.2)	0.1 (32.2)	13.1 (55.5)
Mean daily minimum °C (°F)	−6.6 (20.1)	−4.0 (24.8)	1.1 (34.0)	7.5 (45.5)	13.4 (56.1)	18.4 (65.1)	22.4 (72.3)	21.5 (70.7)	15.9 (60.6)	8.8 (47.8)	1.8 (35.2)	−4.3 (24.3)	8.0 (46.4)
Record low °C (°F)	−18.7 (−1.7)	−18.2 (−0.8)	−11.0 (12.2)	−5.6 (21.9)	0.9 (33.6)	8.9 (48.0)	13.5 (56.3)	11.8 (53.2)	4.8 (40.6)	−3.5 (25.7)	−12.3 (9.9)	−18.0 (−0.4)	−18.7 (−1.7)
Average precipitation mm (inches)	8.1 (0.32)	13.5 (0.53)	14.6 (0.57)	33.4 (1.31)	55.2 (2.17)	78.5 (3.09)	145.0 (5.71)	177.2 (6.98)	66.2 (2.61)	30.6 (1.20)	26.7 (1.05)	10.9 (0.43)	659.9 (25.97)
Average precipitation days (≥ 0.1 mm)	2.8	3.6	3.7	5.5	7.2	7.9	11.6	11.6	6.5	5.2	4.9	3.8	74.3
Average snowy days	4.1	3.6	1.5	0.1	0	0	0	0	0	0	0.8	2.8	12.9
Average relative humidity (%)	64	61	55	57	63	68	79	82	76	71	69	66	68
Mean monthly sunshine hours	160.9	163.7	210.5	227.6	251.9	217.1	188.9	189.4	195.8	192.2	162.6	163.1	2,323.7
Percentage possible sunshine	52	53	57	58	58	50	43	46	53	56	54	54	53
Source: China Meteorological Administration all-time extreme temperature all-time August high
