= Guān =

Guan (關/关)
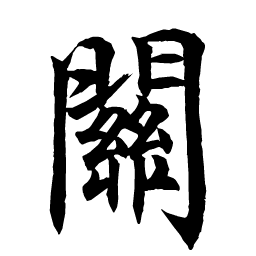
- Pronunciation: Guān (Mandarin); Kwan (Hong Kong and overseas Chinese); Kuan (Macao, Taiwan, and overseas Chinese); Quan (Vietnamese and overseas Chinese); Seki (Japanese)
- Language: Chinese, Japanese, Vietnamese

Origin
- Language: Chinese
- Origin: China
- Meaning: Close

Guan (traditional Chinese: 關; simplified Chinese: 关; pinyin: Guān) is a Chinese surname. Guan is 394th in the Hundred Family Surnames.

In Hong Kong, the surname is romanised as Kwan in Cantonese. In Taiwan, the Wade–Giles spelling Kuan is used. In Macao, the surname is as Kuan due to the Portuguese influence. In addition the surname Cuan is also used in Mexico.

In many overseas Chinese communities, both spellings, Kuan and Kwan, as well as Quan, are common.

It is also a Vietnamese surname that uses the same character, romanised as Quan.

It is also a Japanese surname, Seki (Japanese: 関), that uses the same character.

The Vietnamese surname, Quan and the Japanese surname, Seki, were derived from the same Chinese character as the Chinese surname (The Japanese Kanji 関 is a Shinjitai of the Chinese character 關).

== Origin and timeline ==
A number of groups in different geographic areas are believed to have shared the surname in history.

- Guan(关 or 關) - meaning is City Gate, or Close the City Gate - originally name for an official, then became a surname.
- During the 23rd century BCE, Dongfu (董父) was a descendant of the ruler Shuan (叔安) in Chifeng within the old Rehe Province of the Khitan state. Dongfu married a daughter of Emperor Yao's tribe, using the surname Dong (董), which later became the surname Kwan (關).
- In 1650 BCE, during the Xia dynasty, Guan Longfeng (關龍逢) was an officer of Jie of Xia's reign.
- In 643 BCE, during the Zhou dynasty, near Mount Xiao within the nation of Jin, the Ji (姬) family used the surname of Dongguan (東關) with region name Dongguan (東關). In China it is common for clans possessing the same surname to live in a village together, with their surname designating the name of the village. Later, the Dongguan (東關) family branched into two surnames: Dǒng (東), and Guan (關). Dongguan Wu (東關五) was an officer of Jin.
- In 604 BCE, during the Zhou dynasty, an officer named Yin Xi (尹喜) is reported to have taken the name Guan Yin (關尹) as his name in public office, designating 關 as his surname. Subsequent generations continued to use 關 as their surname.
- The surname 關 has also been widely adopted by various non-Chinese ethnic groups from both southern and northern China, such as the Zhuang, De'ang, Mongolian and Manchurian peoples.
- Around 1080 CE, the surname 關 arrives in the province of Guangdong at Xinhui, five generations later at Kaiping (Hoiping) in Guangdong province.
- During the Jin dynasty (1115–1234), the surname 關 has also been founded by the Jurchen people of the Guaerjia.
- Near the end of the 19th century (1880s), population pressure on the limited arable land in Kaiping county, mainly along the Tan river, induces the rural poor 關 to emigrate overseas, largely (~70%) to North America and rest to Southeast Asia.

== Historical figures ==
- Guan Yu (關羽, d. 220 CE), general of Shu Han during the Three Kingdoms era; aka Kuan Kung in Chinese folklore.
- Guan Ping (關平), Guan Yu's son, also a general of Shu Han
- Guan Xing (關興), son of Guan Yu and younger brother of Guan Ping, also a general of Shu Han
- Guan Bo (關播) official and chancellor of the Tang dynasty
- Guan Tong (關仝, c. 906–960), Chinese landscape painter during the Five Dynasties and Ten Kingdoms period
- Guan Hanqing (關漢卿, c. 1241–1320), playwright and poet in the Yuan dynasty
- Guan Tianpei (關天培, 1781–1841), Chinese admiral of the Qing dynasty, who served in the First Opium War
- Guan Xie (關寫, 1889–1928), writer and poet during World War I

== Modern people ==
- Guan Zilan (关紫兰, 1903–1986), Chinese avant-garde painter
- Guan Linzheng (關麟徵, 1905–1980), Kuomintang general
- Kwan Man-ching (關文清, 1896–1995), Hong Kong director
- Kwan Tak-hing (關德興, 1905–1996), Hong Kong actor famous for playing the role of Wong Fei-hung
- Kwan Hoi-san (關海山, 1925–2006), Hong Kong actor
- Yu-chien Kuan (关愚谦, 1931–2018), Chinese-born German sinologist, writer, and translator
- Nancy Kwan (關家蒨, b. 1939), Chinese-American actress known for her Hollywood films
- Michael Kwan (關正傑, b. 1949), Hong Kong Cantopop singer
- Jean Quan (關麗珍, b. 1949), American politician
- Karen Kwan, multiple people
- Stanley Kwan (關錦鵬, b. 1957), Hong Kong director and producer
- Susanna Kwan (關菊英, b. 1958), Hong Kong singer and actress
- Betty Kwan Chinn (關惠群), Chinese-American philanthropist, 2010 U.S. Presidential Citizens Medalist
- Kwan Chi Lam (關之琳, b. 1962), Hong Kong actress
- Esther Kwan (關詠荷, b. 1964), Hong Kong actress
- Shirley Kwan (關淑怡, b. 1966), Hong Kong Cantopop singer
- Ke Huy Quan (關繼威, b. 1971), American actor and stunt coordinator
- Jade Kwan (關心妍, b. 1979), Hong Kong Cantopop singer
- Julia Kwan, Canadian screenwriter and director
- Michelle Kwan (關穎珊, b. 1980), American competitive figure skater, two-time Olympic medalist, five-time World Champion
- Kelvin Kwan (關楚耀, b. 1983), Hong Kong Cantopop singer
- Guan Xiaotong (关晓彤, b. 1997), Chinese actress
- Guan Xuezeng (关学曾, 1922–2006), Chinese actor
- Guan Tianlang (關天朗, b. 1998), Chinese golfer
- Lily Kwan (关莉莉), Canadian model and newscaster on Naked News
- Kevin Kwan, Singaporean novelist
- Kwan Swee Lian, Malaysian chef and businessperson
- Steven Kwan, American professional baseball player
- Daniel Kwan, (關家永, b. 1988) American film director, producer and screenwriter
- Sharon Kwan, (關詩敏, b. 1995) Chinese-American singer

== Japanese people with the surname Seki (関) ==
=== Historical figures ===
- Seki Takakazu (関 孝和, 1642–1708), mathematician in the Edo period

=== Notable modern people ===
- Megumi Seki, actress
- Tsutomu Seki (関 勉, b. 1930), Japanese astronomer who discovered large numbers of comets and asteroids
- Tomokazu Seki (関 智一, b. 1972), Japanese voice actor
