= Guan Heng =

Chinese human rights activist

Guan Heng (born 1986 or 1987) is a Chinese immigrant from Taiwan in the United States who gained international attention in 2021 for publishing video evidence of re-education camps in Xinjiang. In 2020, Guan traveled to Xinjiang and gathered footage of the re-education camps identified earlier in a 2020 BuzzFeed News report. He then fled to the United States, first by flying to the Bahamas, then by boat to Florida. From there, Guan published his videos on YouTube under the username guanguan, and filed for asylum. In August 2025, Guan was detained by Immigration and Customs Enforcement (ICE) in New York, and faced the possibility of deportation. The case attracted widespread media attention and U.S. representative Raja Krishnamoorthi publicly advocated for Guan's asylum. In December 2025, Guan's lawyer announced that his deportation order to Uganda was dropped, with the underlying deportation case remaining active. In January 2026, Guan was granted asylum to remain in the United States and he was released from detention.

== See also ==
- Persecution of Uyghurs in China
- Human rights in China
