= Hanting, Weifang =

Hanting 寒亭区
- District
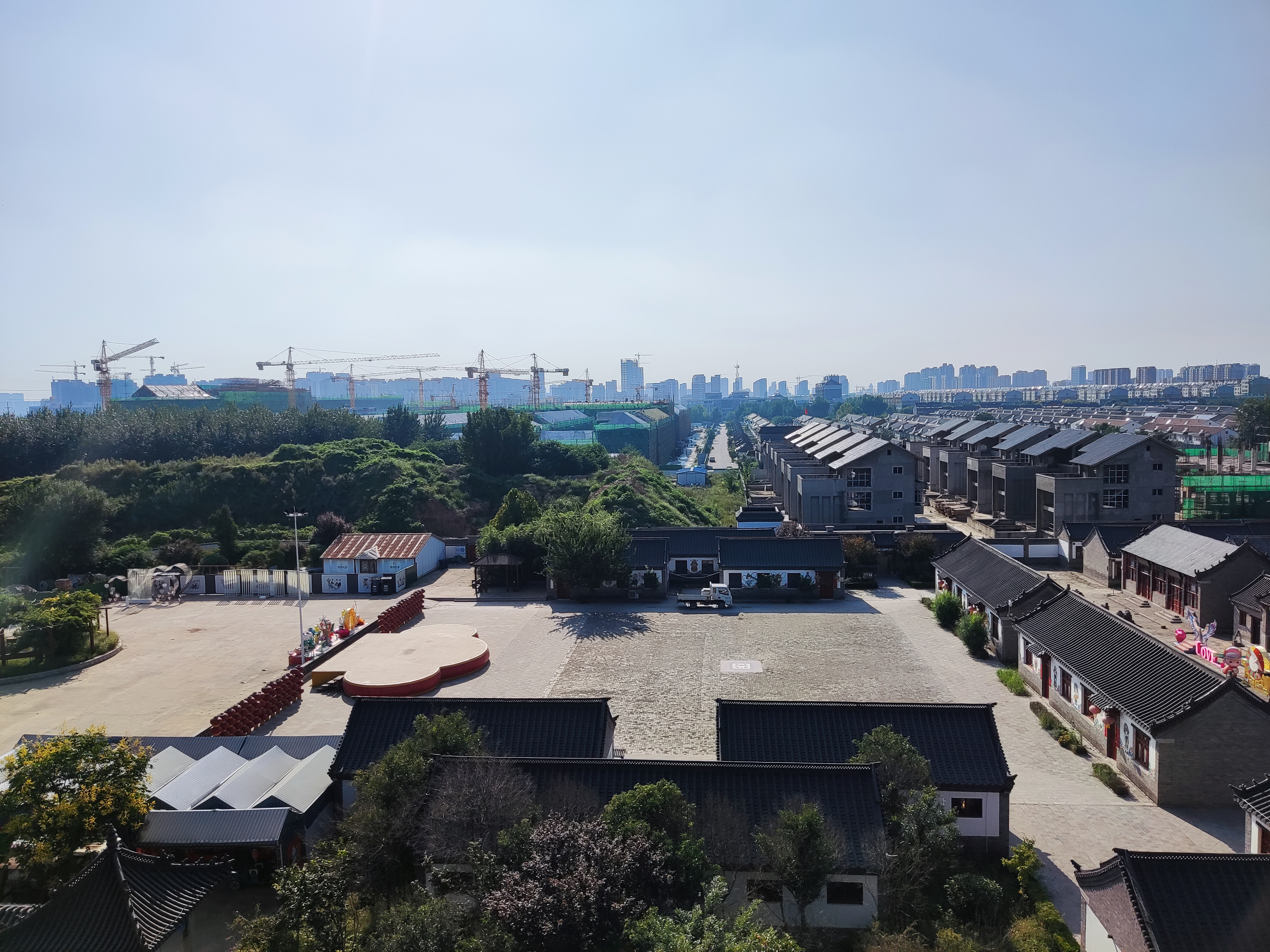

- Location in Shandong
- Coordinates: 36°46′11″N 119°12′33″E
- Country: People's Republic of China
- Province: Shandong
- Prefecture-level city: Weifang

Area
  - Total: 898 km^{2} (347 sq mi)

Population (2014)
  - Total: 355,000
  - Density: 395/km^{2} (1,020/sq mi)
- Time zone: UTC+8 (China Standard)
- Postal code: 261100

Hanting (simplified Chinese: 寒亭区; traditional Chinese: 寒亭區; pinyin: Hántíng Qū) is an urban district of the city of Weifang, Shandong province, China, bordering the Laizhou Bay in its far north.

== Administrative divisions ==
As of 2012, this district is divided to 7 subdistricts.

Subdistricts

- Hanting Subdistrict (寒亭街道)
- Kaiyuan Subdistrict (开元街道)
- Gudi Subdistrict (固堤街道)
- Yangzi Subdistrict (央子街道)
- Gaoli Subdistrict (高里街道)
- Zhuli Subdistrict (朱里街道)
- Dajiawa Subdistrict (大家洼街道)
