= Weicheng, Weifang =

Weicheng 潍城区
- District
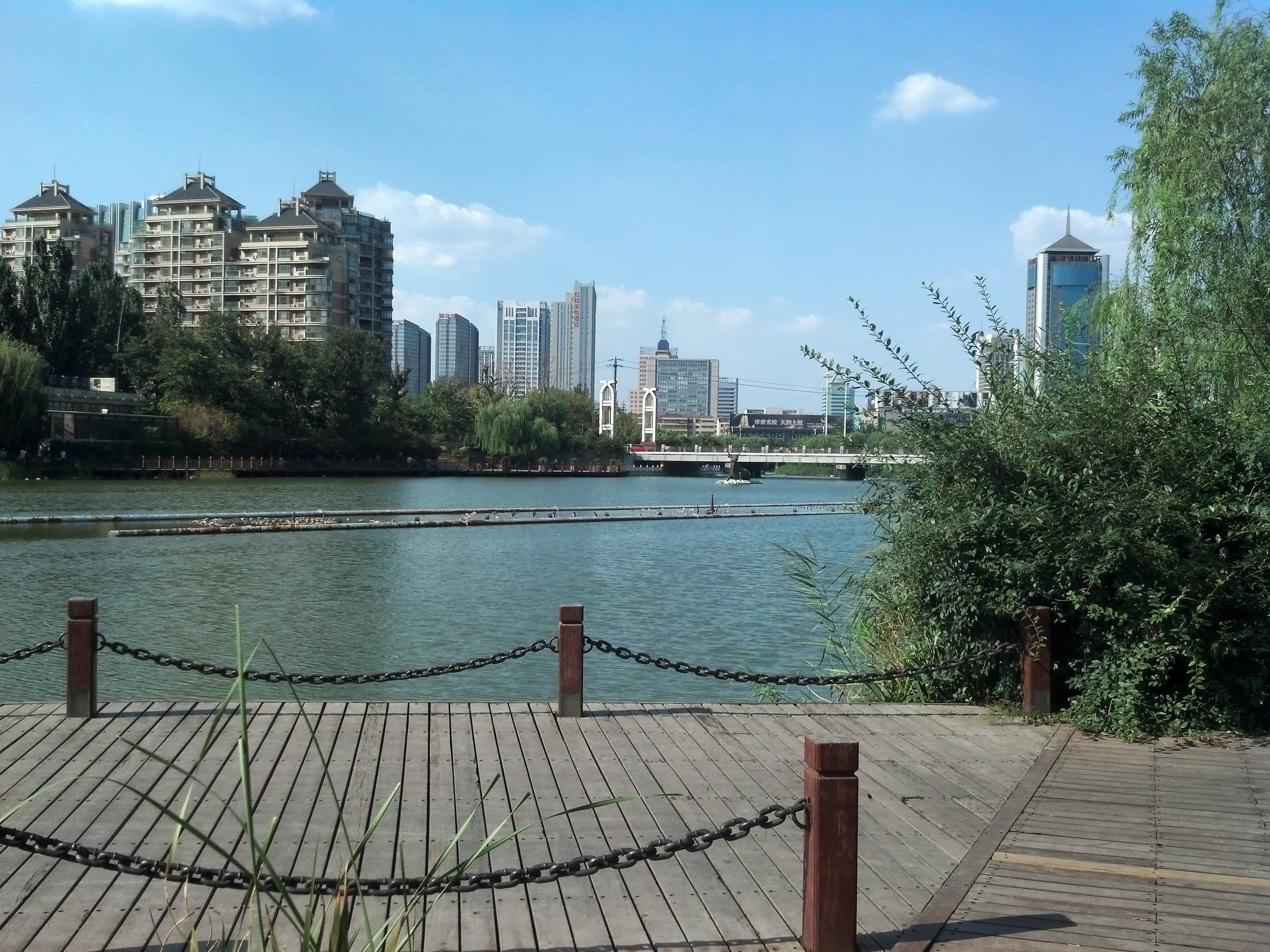
- Living area in Weicheng

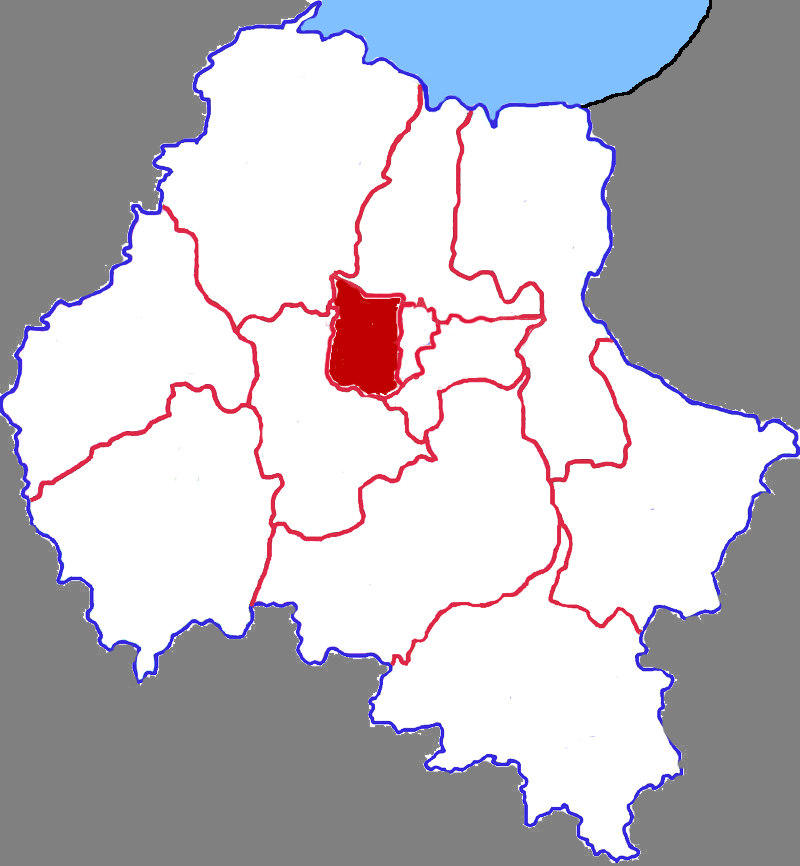
- Location of Weicheng in Weifang

- Location of the seat in Shandong
- Coordinates: 36°43′41″N 119°01′29″E
- Country: People's Republic of China
- Province: Shandong
- Prefecture-level city: Weifang

Area
  - Total: 269.5 km^{2} (104.1 sq mi)

Population (2017)
  - Total: 429,000
  - Density: 1,590/km^{2} (4,120/sq mi)
- Time zone: UTC+8 (China Standard)
- Postal code: 261021

Weicheng District (simplified Chinese: 潍城区; traditional Chinese: 濰城區; pinyin: Wéichéng Qū) is a district of Weifang, Shandong, China. Weicheng has an area of 272.3 km^{2} (105.1 sq mi) and around 368,200 inhabitants (2003).

== Administrative divisions ==
As of 2012, this district is divided to 6 subdistricts.

Subdistricts

- Chengguan Subdistrict (城关街道)
- Nanguan Subdistrict (南关街道)
- Xiguan Subdistrict (西关街道)
- Beiguan Subdistrict (北关街道)
- Yuhe Subdistrict (于河街道)
- Wangliu Subdistrict (望留街道)
