= List of universities and colleges in Shandong =

Universities in Shandong, China

Double First-Class Universities in Shandong province: 985 level 211 level

The following is a list of universities and colleges in Shandong. As of 2012, there are 154 institutions of higher learning in the province, out of which 62 offer bachelor's degree studies. 29 colleges and universities also offer master's degree level of studies, as do four research institutes.

== List ==
Note: The default order of the list follows the order provided by the Ministry of Education.

Name	Chinese name	Type	Location
Shandong University	山东大学	National (Direct)	Jinan
Ocean University of China	中国海洋大学	National (Direct)	Qingdao
Shandong University of Science and Technology	山东科技大学	Provincial	Qingdao
China University of Petroleum (East China)	中国石油大学（华东）	National (Direct)	Qingdao
Qingdao University of Science and Technology	青岛科技大学	Provincial	Qingdao
University of Jinan	济南大学	Provincial	Jinan
Qingdao University of Technology	青岛理工大学	Provincial	Qingdao
Shandong Jianzhu University	山东建筑大学	Provincial	Jinan
Qilu University of Technology	齐鲁工业大学	Provincial	Jinan
Shandong University of Technology	山东理工大学	Provincial	Zibo
Shandong Agricultural University	山东农业大学	Provincial	Tai'an
Qingdao Agricultural University	青岛农业大学	Provincial	Qingdao
Weifang Medical University	潍坊医学院	Provincial	Weifang
Taishan Medical University	泰山医学院	Provincial	Tai'an
Binzhou Medical University	滨州医学院	Provincial	Binzhou
Shandong University of Traditional Chinese Medicine	山东中医药大学	Provincial	Jinan
Jining Medical University	济宁医学院	Provincial	Jining
Shandong Normal University	山东师范大学	Provincial	Jinan
Qufu Normal University	曲阜师范大学	Provincial	Jining
Liaocheng University	聊城大学	Provincial	Liaocheng
Dezhou University	德州学院	Provincial	Dezhou
Binzhou University	滨州学院	Provincial	Binzhou
Ludong University	鲁东大学	Provincial	Yantai
Linyi University	临沂大学	Provincial	Linyi
Taishan University	泰山学院	Provincial	Tai'an
Jining University	济宁学院	Provincial	Jining
Heze University	菏泽学院	Provincial	Heze
Shandong University of Finance and Economics	山东财经大学	Provincial	Jinan
Shandong Sport University	山东体育学院	Provincial	Jinan
Shandong University of Arts	山东艺术学院	Provincial	Jinan
Qilu Medical University	齐鲁医药学院	Private	Zibo
Qingdao Binhai University	青岛滨海学院	Private	Qingdao
Zaozhuang University	枣庄学院	Provincial	Zaozhuang
Shandong University of Art and Design	山东工艺美术学院	Provincial	Jinan
Qingdao University	青岛大学	Provincial	Qingdao
Yantai University	烟台大学	Provincial	Yantai
Weifang University	潍坊学院	Provincial	Weifang
Shandong Police College	山东警察学院	Provincial	Jinan
Shandong Jiaotong University	山东交通学院	Provincial	Jinan
Shandong Technology and Business University	山东工商学院	Provincial	Yantai
Shandong Women's University	山东女子学院	Provincial	Jinan
Yantai Nanshan University	烟台南山学院	Private	Yantai
Shandong Xiehe University	山东协和学院	Private	Jinan
Wenjing College, Yantai University	烟台大学文经学院	Private	Yantai
Qindao College, Qingdao University of Technology	青岛理工大学琴岛学院	Private	Qingdao
Shengli College, China University of Petroleum	中国石油大学胜利学院	Private	Dongying
Shandong Huayu University of Technology	山东华宇工学院	Private	Dezhou
Qingdao University of Technology	青岛工学院	Private	Qingdao
Shandong University of Political Science and Law	山东政法学院	Provincial	Jinan
Qilu Normal University	齐鲁师范学院	Provincial	Jinan
Shandong Youth University of Political Science	山东青年政治学院	Provincial	Jinan
Modern Creative Media College, Beijing Film Academy	北京电影学院现代创意媒体学院	Private	Qingdao
Shandong Management University	山东管理学院	Provincial	Jinan
Shandong Agriculture and Engineering University	山东农业工程学院	Provincial	Jinan

== Special schools ==
=== Branch schools of other national universities ===
- Harbin Institute of Technology at Weihai Ω
- China Agricultural University at Yantai Ω

=== Branch schools of other universities ===
- Harbin University of Science and Technology at Rongcheng

=== Provincial colleges with associate-degree studies ===
- Qingdao Technical College
- Rizhao Polytechnic
- Zibo Vocational Institute

=== Private colleges with associate-degree studies ===
- Shandong Foreign Languages Vocational College

== See also ==
- List of universities and colleges in China
