= Wulian County =

Wulian County 五莲县
- County
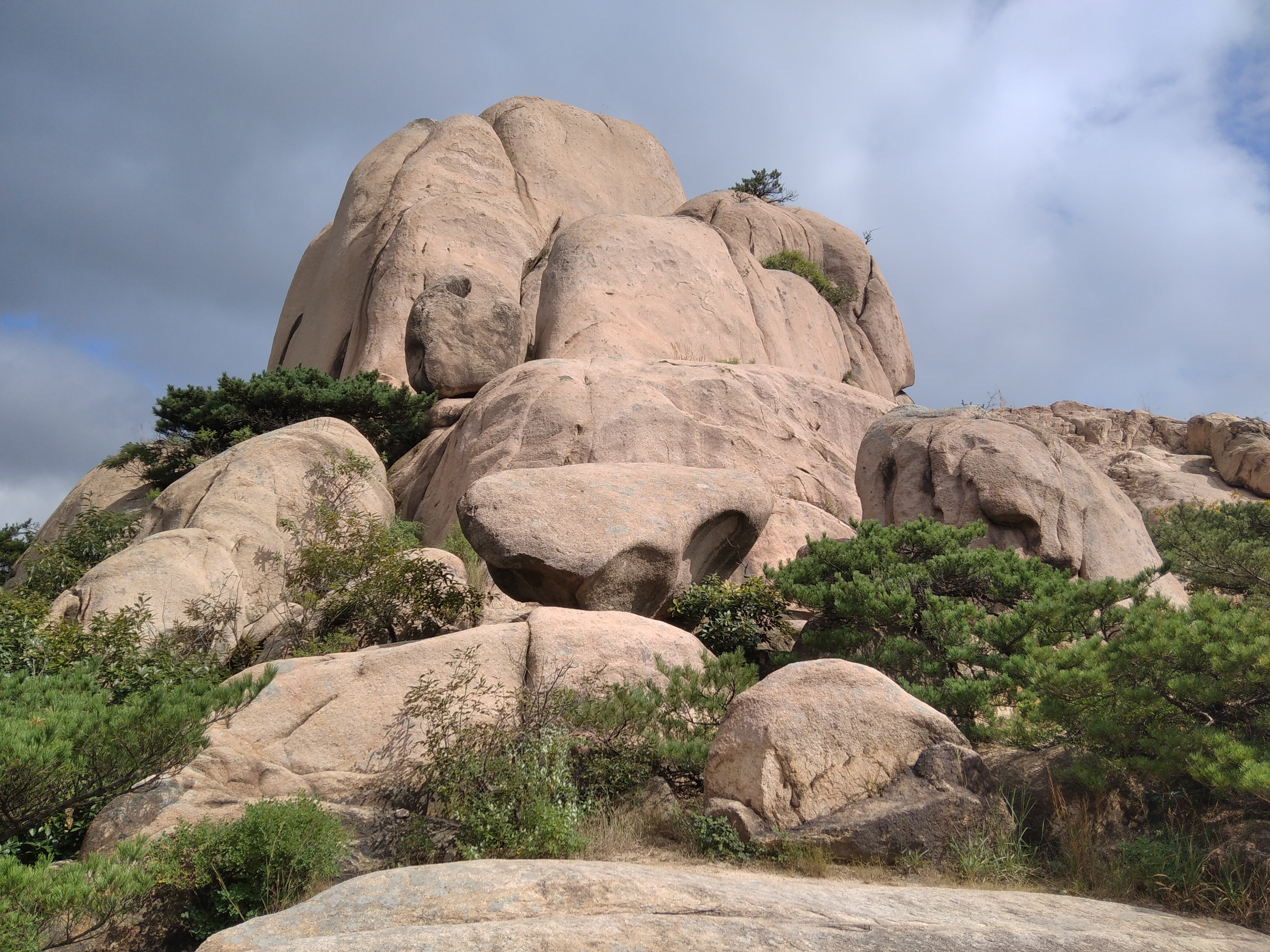
- Wulian Mountain

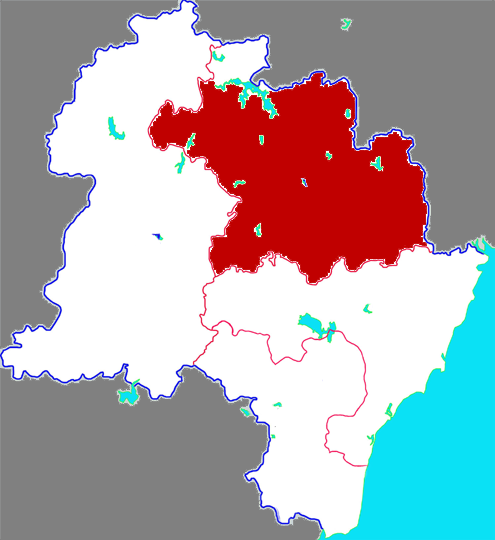
- Wulian in Rizhao

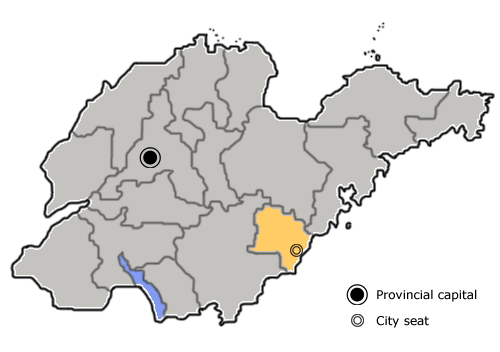
- Rizhao in Shandong
- Coordinates (Wulian government): 35°45′37″N 119°12′49″E
- Country: People's Republic of China
- Province: Shandong
- Prefecture-level city: Rizhao

Government
  - Party Secretary: Ma Weiqiang
  - Governor: Zhu Guiyou

Area
  - Total: 1,497 km^{2} (578 sq mi)

Population (2019)
  - Total: 500,000
  - Density: 330/km^{2} (870/sq mi)
- Time zone: UTC+8 (China Standard)
- Postal code: 262300
- Website: www.wulian.gov.cn

Wulian County (simplified Chinese: 五莲县; traditional Chinese: 五蓮縣; pinyin: Wǔlián Xiàn) is a county of the prefecture-level city of Rizhao, Shandong. The county is known for and named after its eponymous Wulian Mountain. It borders Zhucheng to the north, Donggang District to the south, Ju County to the west and Xihai'an to the east.

Wulian is the birthplace of noted poet Wang Fugang.

== Geography ==
=== Administrative divisions ===
Wulian County administers one subdistrict, nine towns and two townships:

Name	Chinese (S)	Hanyu Pinyin
Hongning Subdistrict	洪凝街道	Hóngníng Jiēdào
Jietou Town	街头镇	Jiētou/Jiētóu Zhèn
Chaohe Town	潮河镇	Cháohé Zhèn
Xumeng Town	许孟镇	Xǔmèng Zhèn
Yuli Town	于里镇	Yúlǐ Zhèn
Wanghu Town	汪湖镇	Wānghú Zhèn
Kouguan Town	叩官镇	Kòuguān Zhèn
Zhongzhi Town	中至镇	Zhōngzhì Zhèn
Gaoze Town	高泽镇	Gāozé Zhèn
Songbai Town	松柏镇	Sōngbǎi Zhèn
Shichang Township	石场乡	Shícháng Xiāng
Hubu Township	户部乡	Hùbù Xiāng

In 2002, Wulian County administered nine towns and three townships:

- Towns: Hongning, Jietou, Yuli, Xumeng 许孟, Chaohe, Wanghu, Kouguan, Zhongzhi, Gaoze.
- Townships: Shichang, Hubu, Songbai.

== Climate ==
Climate data for Wulian, elevation 148 m (486 ft), (1991–2020 normals, extremes 1981–present)
Month	Jan	Feb	Mar	Apr	May	Jun	Jul	Aug	Sep	Oct	Nov	Dec	Year
Record high °C (°F)	17.5 (63.5)	23.3 (73.9)	29.3 (84.7)	34.2 (93.6)	38.9 (102.0)	38.1 (100.6)	40.7 (105.3)	38.7 (101.7)	37.7 (99.9)	34.4 (93.9)	26.3 (79.3)	20.0 (68.0)	40.7 (105.3)
Mean daily maximum °C (°F)	3.9 (39.0)	7.1 (44.8)	13.1 (55.6)	20.1 (68.2)	25.7 (78.3)	28.9 (84.0)	30.7 (87.3)	29.9 (85.8)	26.5 (79.7)	20.8 (69.4)	13.0 (55.4)	6.0 (42.8)	18.8 (65.9)
Daily mean °C (°F)	−0.9 (30.4)	1.9 (35.4)	7.3 (45.1)	14.2 (57.6)	19.9 (67.8)	23.5 (74.3)	26.2 (79.2)	25.5 (77.9)	21.4 (70.5)	15.4 (59.7)	8.0 (46.4)	1.3 (34.3)	13.6 (56.6)
Mean daily minimum °C (°F)	−4.5 (23.9)	−2.0 (28.4)	2.9 (37.2)	9.3 (48.7)	15.1 (59.2)	19.3 (66.7)	22.8 (73.0)	22.2 (72.0)	17.3 (63.1)	11.0 (51.8)	4.1 (39.4)	−2.2 (28.0)	9.6 (49.3)
Record low °C (°F)	−15.3 (4.5)	−14.2 (6.4)	−7.6 (18.3)	−2.8 (27.0)	2.6 (36.7)	10.0 (50.0)	15.4 (59.7)	12.8 (55.0)	7.1 (44.8)	−1.7 (28.9)	−10.6 (12.9)	−15.9 (3.4)	−15.9 (3.4)
Average precipitation mm (inches)	12.1 (0.48)	16.5 (0.65)	18.1 (0.71)	32.4 (1.28)	64.5 (2.54)	88.9 (3.50)	168.9 (6.65)	234.7 (9.24)	81.4 (3.20)	32.8 (1.29)	32.5 (1.28)	14.3 (0.56)	797.1 (31.38)
Average precipitation days (≥ 0.1 mm)	3.4	4.0	4.8	6.6	7.6	8.3	12.4	12.4	7.5	5.6	5.3	3.4	81.3
Average snowy days	4.2	3.1	1.7	0.2	0	0	0	0	0	0	1.0	2.4	12.6
Average relative humidity (%)	60	59	54	54	58	68	78	80	72	65	64	61	64
Mean monthly sunshine hours	164.4	166.3	213.5	229.1	252.8	225.5	195.7	196.4	197.3	199.9	167.9	165.7	2,374.5
Percentage possible sunshine	53	54	57	58	58	52	44	47	54	58	55	55	54
Source: China Meteorological Administration all-time August record high
