= Rizhao Shanzihe Airport =

Airport in Donggang District, People's Republic of China

Rizhao Shanzihe Airport 日照山字河机场
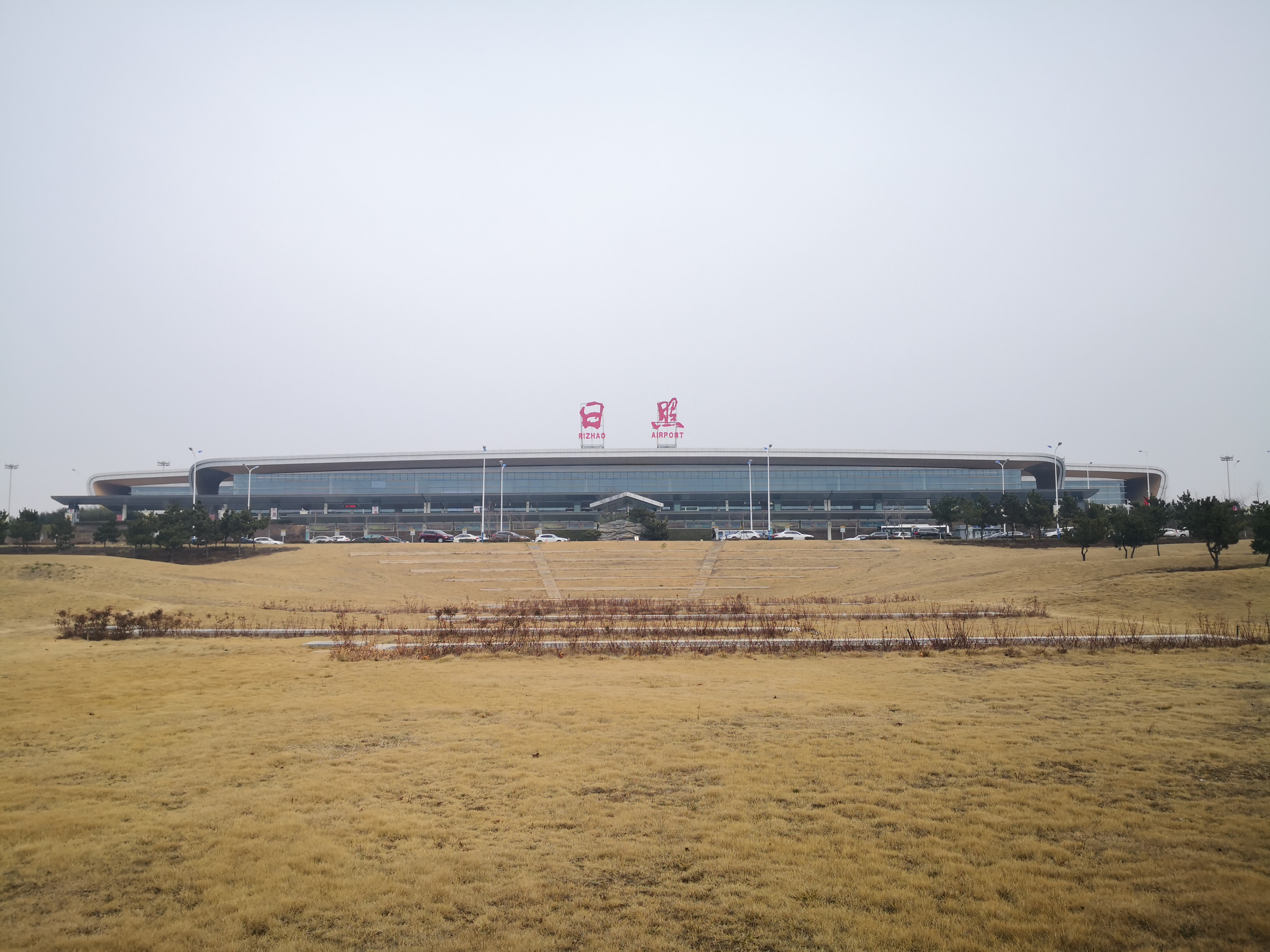
- Terminal building
- IATA: RIZ; ICAO: ZSRZ

Summary
- Airport type: Public
- Serves: Rizhao, Shandong
- Location: Houcun, Donggang District, Rizhao
- Opened: 22 December 2015; 10 years ago
- Coordinates: 35°23′59″N 119°19′0″E
- Website: www.rzairport.com.cn

Map
- Location of airport in Shandong

Runways
| Direction | Length | | Surface |
| Direction | m | ft | Surface |
|---|---|---|---|
| 13/31 | 2,600 | 8,530 | Concrete |

Statistics (2025)
- Passengers: 784,300
- Cargo: 2,151.8 metric tons
- Aircraft movements: 67,218
- Source: List of the busiest airports in the People's Republic of China

Rizhao Shanzihe Airport
- Simplified Chinese: 日照山字河机场
- Traditional Chinese: 日照山字河機場
Transcriptions
Standard Mandarin
- Hanyu Pinyin: Rìzhào Shānzìhé Jīchǎng

Rizhao Shanzihe Airport (IATA: RIZ, ICAO: ZSRZ) is an airport serving the city of Rizhao in Shandong Province, China. The airport received approval from the State Council of China and the Central Military Commission in October 2013. It is located in Houcun Town (后村镇), Donggang District. It was opened on 22 December 2015.

== History ==
In 2009, the site selection process for Rizhao Shanzhehe Airport commenced. In 2011, the airport was included in the "12th Five-Year Plan for National Economic and Social Development of Shandong Province" and the "12th Five-Year Plan for the Development of Civil Aviation in China"; on December 14, the Rizhao Shanzhehe Airport Office was established.

On October 16, 2012, the Civil Aviation Administration of China approved the Shanzhehe site in Houchun Town, Donggang District, as the site for Rizhao Airport. On October 10, 2013, the State Council of the People's Republic of China and the Central Military Commission jointly approved the construction of the new Rizhao Civil Airport in Shandong Province. The new airport was positioned as a domestic civil feeder airport with a 4C flight zone rating. The plan included the construction of a 2600×45 meter runway and corresponding supporting facilities.

Construction of the airport officially began on December 10, 2013. On November 28, 2014, the feasibility study of the airport project was passed. The airport passed civil aviation industry acceptance on September 18, 2015, a total of 667 days. It officially opened to traffic on December 22, 2015. Rizhao Shanzhehe Airport was designed to handle 900,000 passengers and 4,500 tons of cargo by 2025.

In 2025, the airport's actual passenger throughput was 784,300 and its cargo throughput was 2,151.8 metric tons, both far below expectations.

== Facilities ==
The airport has a 2,600-meter runway (class 4C) and a 22,000-square-meter terminal building. It was projected cost 1.34 billion yuan to build.

== Airlines and destinations ==
A China Southern Airlines plane to Shenzhen taking off

| Airlines | Destinations |
|---|---|
| China Eastern Airlines | Kunming, Ordos, Wuhan |
| China Express Airlines | Taiyuan |
| Hainan Airlines | Dalian, Shenzhen |
| Shanghai Airlines | Dalian, Shanghai–Pudong |
| West Air | Shenyang |

== See also ==
- List of airports in China
- List of the busiest airports in China
