= Lanqiao =

Deep water port in Shandong, China

Lanqiao is a deep water port in Shandong, China, located south of Rizhao.

Built between 2010 and 2016 by reclaiming land, Lanqiao is a prominent port for loading and discharging mineral ores and other bulk cargoes. It also has an oil terminal. Primarily catering to the iron and steel industry in China, the port became fully functional in 2014 and lies within the Lanshan administrative region, south of Rizhao port. The terminal and shiploaders were built by ZPMC and the port can handle Post Panamax bulk carriers of up to 205,000 deadweight tonnage. The port is equipped with grab ship unloaders, reclaimers, stackers, a train loader and belt conveyors. The entire bulk cargo terminal including the machinery as well as the water drainage power and lighting were developed by ZPMC.
