= Rizhao =

Rizhao 日照市 Jihchao
- Prefecture-level city
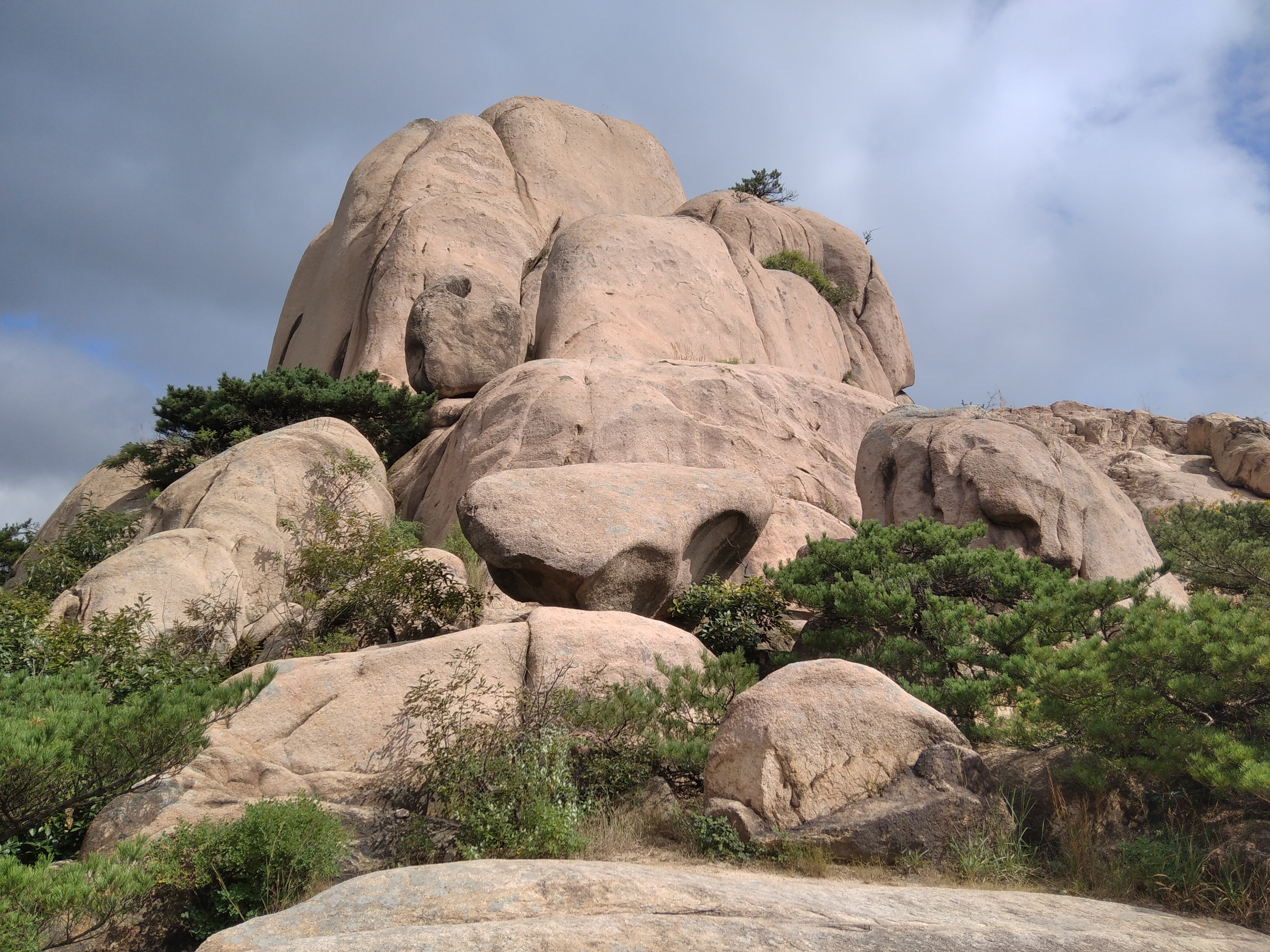
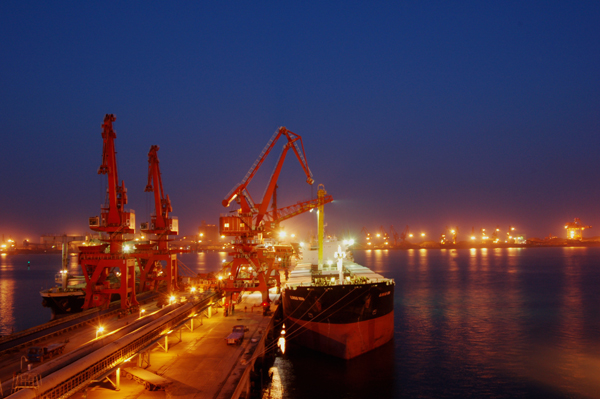
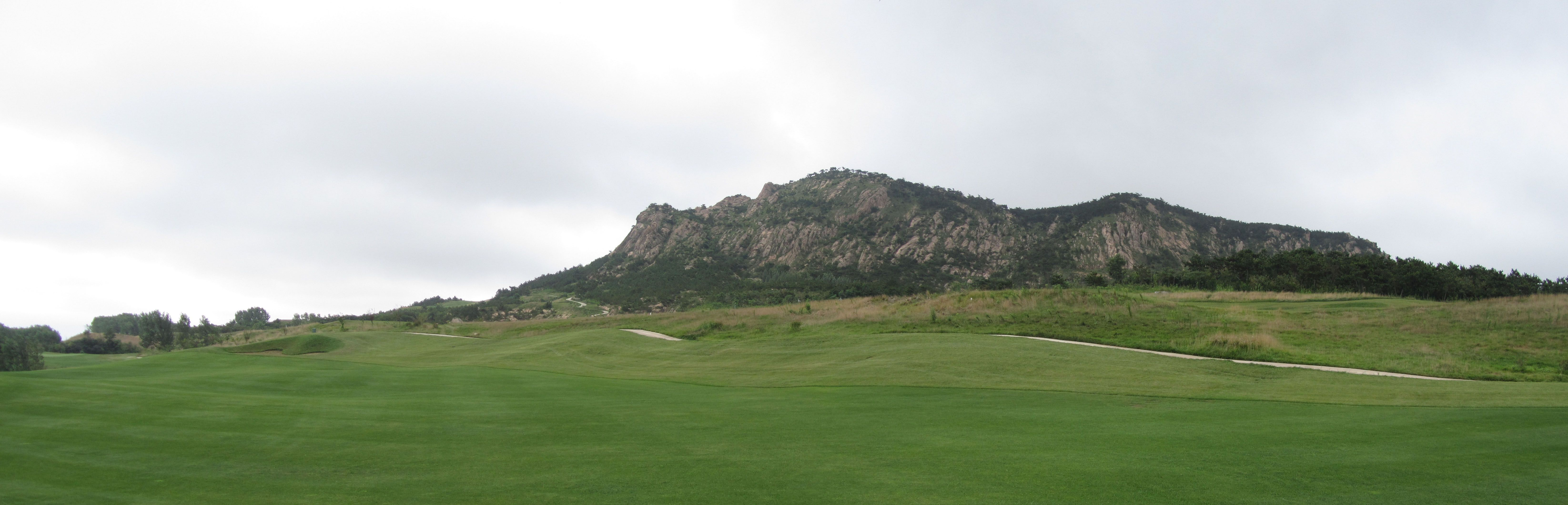
- Wulian Mountain Yellow Sea Rizhao Seaport Ju Xian Kui Hill

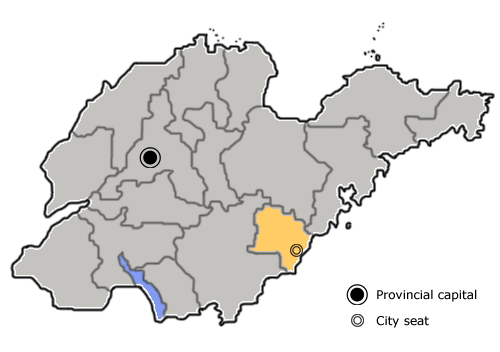
- Location of Rizhao City jurisdiction in Shandong
- Coordinates (Rizhao municipal government): 35°25′01″N 119°31′37″E
- Country: People's Republic of China
- Province: Shandong
- County-level divisions: 4
- Municipal seat: Donggang District

Government
  - CCP Municipal Committee Secretary: Li Zaiwu (李在武)
  - Mayor: Wang Xinsheng (王新生)

Area
  - Prefecture-level city: 5,359 km^{2} (2,069 sq mi)
  - Urban: 1,915 km^{2} (739 sq mi)
  - Metro: 1,507 km^{2} (582 sq mi)

Population (2020 census)
  - Prefecture-level city: 2,968,365
  - Density: 553.9/km^{2} (1,435/sq mi)
  - Urban: 1,551,513
  - Urban density: 810.2/km^{2} (2,098/sq mi)
  - Metro: 1,172,205
  - Metro density: 777.8/km^{2} (2,015/sq mi)

GDP
  - Prefecture-level city: CN¥ 256 billion US$ 36 billion
  - Per capita: CN¥ 87,000; US$ 12,300
- Time zone: UTC+8 (China Standard)
- Postal code: 276800
- Area code: 0633
- ISO 3166 code: CN-SD-11
- License Plate Prefix: 鲁L

Rizhao
- Chinese: 日照
- Literal meaning: "Sunshine"
Transcriptions
Standard Mandarin
- Hanyu Pinyin: Rìzhào
- Gwoyeu Romatzyh: Ryhjaw
- Wade–Giles: Jih^{4}-chao^{4}
- IPA: [ɻɨ̂.ʈʂâʊ]
Yue: Cantonese
- Yale Romanization: Yat-jiuh
- Jyutping: Jat^{3}-ziu^{6}
Southern Min
- Tâi-lô: Ji̍t-tsiò

Rizhao (Chinese: 日照; pinyin: Rìzhào), alternatively romanized as Jihchao, is a prefecture-level city in southeastern Shandong province, China. It is situated on the coastline along the Yellow Sea, and features a major seaport, the Port of Rizhao. It borders Qingdao to the northeast, Weifang to the north, Linyi to the west and southwest, and faces Korea and Japan across the Yellow Sea to the east.

The name of the city literally means "sunshine". The city is known for its sustainability, and it mandates solar-water heaters in all new buildings. Rizhao city was recognized by the United Nations as one of the most habitable cities in the world in 2009.

The city population stands at 2,968,365 people as of the 2020 Chinese census, of whom 1,172,205 live in the urban area of Donggang District. As of 2024, the resident population is estimated at 2,929,000. Compared with the 2,801,013 people in 2010 Chinese census, there has been a total increase of 167,352 people in the past decade, an increase of 5.97%, with an average annual growth rate of 0.58%.

== History ==
Rizhao is located at the place where the ancient Dawenkou culture and the Longshan culture flourished. Rizhao belonged to the Dongyi people during the Xia and Shang dynasties (2070-1046 BC), and to Ju and Yue States in the Spring and Autumn period (770-476 BC) and the Warring States period (476-221 BC). It became a part of Langye Commandery in the Qin dynasty (221-206 BC). Rizhao was named Haiqu County (海曲縣) during the Western Han (206 BC-25 AD) and Xihai County under the Eastern Han (25-220 AD). The fangsheng pond of Haiqu's early Buddhist community is the earliest attested.

During the Tang dynasty, together with Ju County, Rizhao belonged to Mi Prefecture of Henan Prefecture. In 1087, during the Northern Song dynasty, Rizhao Town was established under Ju County, originating the name meaning "(the place that first receives the) sunshine" due to its eastern coastal location. Rizhao County was set up in 1184 during the Jin dynasty. In 1940, it came under the control of the Chinese Communist Party. After being a county and since 1985 a city under the administration of Linyi, Rizhao became a prefecture-level city within Shandong province in 1989.

The Field Museum of Natural History in Chicago has done field survey archaeological work in Rizhao over the years.

== Climate ==
Rizhao has a temperate, four-season, monsoon-influenced climate that lies in the transition between the humid subtropical (Köppen Cwa) and humid continental (Köppen Dwa) regimes. Winter is cool to cold and windy, but generally dry, with a January average of 0.3 °C (32.5 °F). Summer is generally hot and humid, but sweltering days are rare, with an August average of 25.5 °C (77.9 °F). Due to its proximity to the coast and being on a peninsula, it experiences a one-month delayed spring compared to much of the province. Conversely, fall is milder than inland areas in Shandong. The annual mean temperature is 13.7 °C (56.7 °F). On average, there are 2,310 hours of bright sunshine annually, and the relative humidity is 69%.

Climate data for Rizhao, elevation 64 m (210 ft), (1991–2020 normals, extremes 1971–2016)
| Month | Jan | Feb | Mar | Apr | May | Jun | Jul | Aug | Sep | Oct | Nov | Dec | Year |
|---|---|---|---|---|---|---|---|---|---|---|---|---|---|
| Record high °C (°F) | 14.6 (58.3) | 19.0 (66.2) | 25.0 (77.0) | 34.0 (93.2) | 35.7 (96.3) | 38.3 (100.9) | 41.4 (106.5) | 36.2 (97.2) | 37.6 (99.7) | 30.2 (86.4) | 25.8 (78.4) | 17.9 (64.2) | 41.4 (106.5) |
| Mean daily maximum °C (°F) | 4.4 (39.9) | 6.4 (43.5) | 11.3 (52.3) | 17.2 (63.0) | 22.5 (72.5) | 25.4 (77.7) | 28.5 (83.3) | 28.9 (84.0) | 25.9 (78.6) | 20.7 (69.3) | 13.4 (56.1) | 6.8 (44.2) | 17.6 (63.7) |
| Daily mean °C (°F) | 0.3 (32.5) | 2.3 (36.1) | 6.8 (44.2) | 12.7 (54.9) | 18.2 (64.8) | 21.8 (71.2) | 25.5 (77.9) | 25.9 (78.6) | 22.3 (72.1) | 16.6 (61.9) | 9.3 (48.7) | 2.7 (36.9) | 13.7 (56.7) |
| Mean daily minimum °C (°F) | −2.8 (27.0) | −0.9 (30.4) | 3.4 (38.1) | 9.0 (48.2) | 14.7 (58.5) | 19.1 (66.4) | 23.1 (73.6) | 23.3 (73.9) | 19.0 (66.2) | 12.9 (55.2) | 5.8 (42.4) | −0.5 (31.1) | 10.5 (50.9) |
| Record low °C (°F) | −16.2 (2.8) | −12.6 (9.3) | −7.1 (19.2) | −2.5 (27.5) | 5.9 (42.6) | 11.5 (52.7) | 14.9 (58.8) | 13.4 (56.1) | 9.4 (48.9) | 0.5 (32.9) | −7.2 (19.0) | −12.2 (10.0) | −16.2 (2.8) |
| Average precipitation mm (inches) | 11.3 (0.44) | 18.6 (0.73) | 22.2 (0.87) | 37.7 (1.48) | 77.5 (3.05) | 87.2 (3.43) | 197.2 (7.76) | 163.4 (6.43) | 86.9 (3.42) | 39.0 (1.54) | 35.3 (1.39) | 16.5 (0.65) | 792.8 (31.19) |
| Average precipitation days (≥ 0.1 mm) | 3.3 | 4.5 | 5.0 | 6.8 | 8.0 | 8.6 | 13.0 | 11.3 | 7.5 | 5.2 | 5.2 | 3.5 | 81.9 |
| Average snowy days | 2.8 | 2.3 | 0.9 | 0.1 | 0 | 0 | 0 | 0 | 0 | 0 | 0.4 | 1.6 | 8.1 |
| Average relative humidity (%) | 59 | 63 | 63 | 65 | 70 | 81 | 86 | 83 | 73 | 65 | 63 | 58 | 69 |
| Mean monthly sunshine hours | 172.9 | 163.4 | 206.8 | 217.8 | 230.1 | 187.5 | 175.3 | 196.7 | 204.9 | 201.3 | 173.2 | 176.6 | 2,306.5 |
| Percentage possible sunshine | 55 | 53 | 55 | 55 | 53 | 43 | 40 | 48 | 56 | 58 | 57 | 58 | 53 |
Source 1: China Meteorological Administrationall-time extreme temperature
Source 2: Weather China

== Administration ==
The prefecture-level city of Rizhao administers four county-level divisions, including two districts and two counties.

- Donggang District (东港区)
- Lanshan District (岚山区)
- Ju County (莒县)
- Wulian County (五莲县)

Map
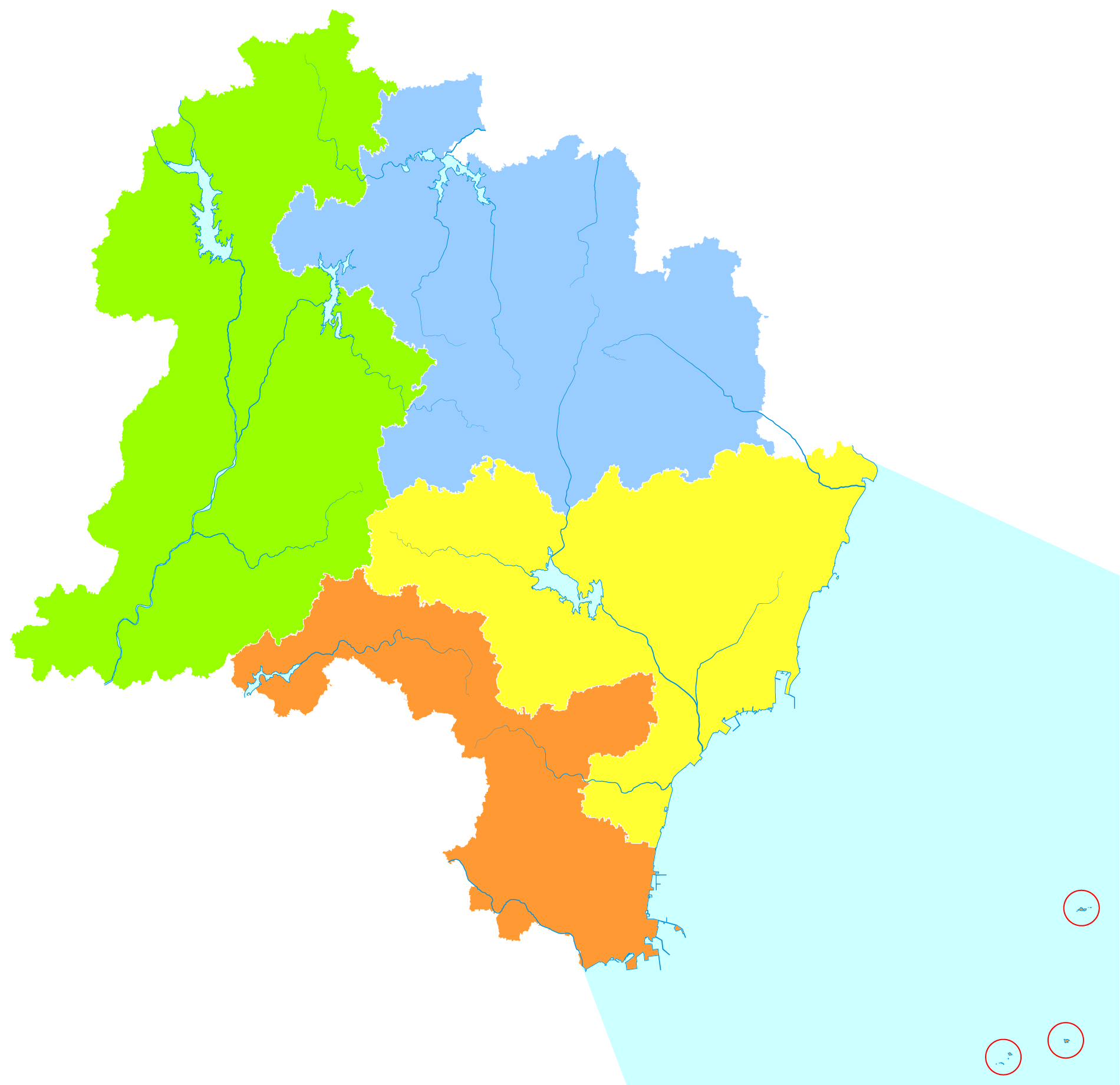

== Landmarks and tourist attractions ==
The Zaishui Art Museum on an artificial lake was completed in December 2023, along with a promenade and café by the Spanish firm SelgasCano. In addition to the museum, Jun'ya Ishigami designed a horseback-riding center, a hotel, and a 148-foot-high, concrete church.

The following locations have a 4-star rating according to Chinese classification for scenic spots (旅游景区质量等级)

- Wulian Mountain (五莲山风景区)
- Daqing Mountain (大青山风景区)
- Wanpingkou Beach (万平口风景区)
- Rizhao Beach National Park (日照海滨国家森林公园)
- Longmengu (龙门崮风景区)
- Liujiawan Park (刘家湾赶海园)
- Tiantai Mountain Tourism Area (天台山旅游区)

== Sustainable development ==
Since the early 1990s, the city has mandated the incorporation of solar water heaters in all new buildings and renovated public buildings, and oversees the construction process to ensure they are correctly installed. The effort to install solar water heaters began in 1992. By 2007, 99% of households in the central districts used solar water heaters, contributing to the city's high sustainability rankings.

== Transportation ==
Rizhao features a major seaport (Port of Rizhao), located approximately 620 km (390 mi) north of Shanghai, 170 km (110 mi) southwest of Qingdao, and 120 km (75 mi) north of Lianyungang. The seaport serves as a site for loading and unloading iron ore and coal. Other products passing through the harbor include cement, nickel, bauxite, and the like. In 2011 the Port of Rizhao, together with the cities of Qingdao, Weihai and Yantai in Shandong, signed a strategic alliance with Busan, the largest port of the Republic of Korea. The alliance aims at building a shipping and logistics center in Northeast Asia. The iron ore port of Lanqiao, which opened in 2014, is located close to it as is the Lanshan port region.

Rizhao Shanzihe Airport (IATA: RIZ) is an airport serving the city of Rizhao. The airport received approval from the State Council and the Central Military Commission in October 2013. It is located in the town of Houcun (后村镇), Donggang District. It was opened on 22 December 2015.

The city is served by two railway stations, Rizhao railway station for local trains, which was rebuilt and reopened in April 2025, and Rizhao West railway station for both local and high-speed services.

== Education ==
=== Universities and colleges ===
Since becoming a city, Rizhao has seen a significant growth in the number of universities and colleges, all of which are located in or near the University City (大学城) of Donggang District.

- Qufu Normal University (曲阜师范大学)
- Jining Medical University (济宁医学院)
- Rizhao Polytechnic (日照技术职业学院)
- Shandong Foreign Languages Vocational College (山东外国语职业学院)
- Shandong Sport College (山东体育学院)
- Shandong Water Conservancy Vocational College (山东水利职业学院)
- Rizhao Marine Engineering Vocational College (日照航海工程职业学院)

== Image gallery ==
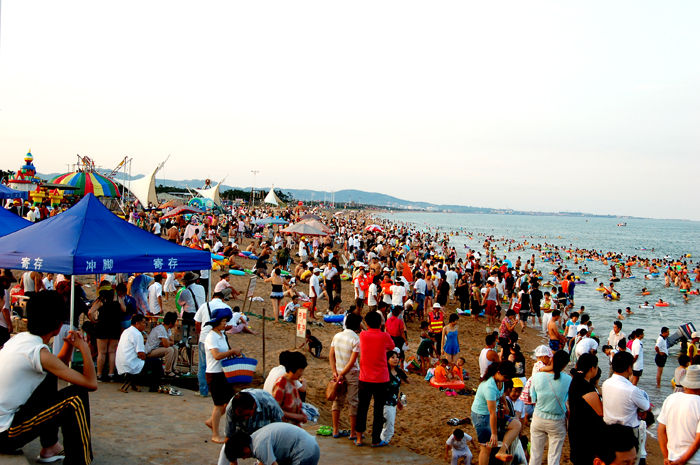
Wanpingkou Beach

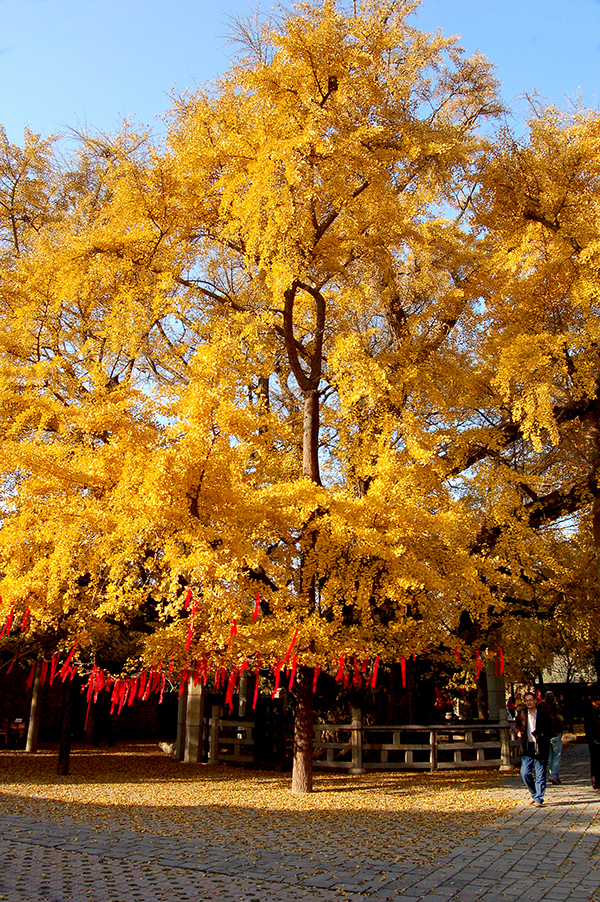
Fulaishan

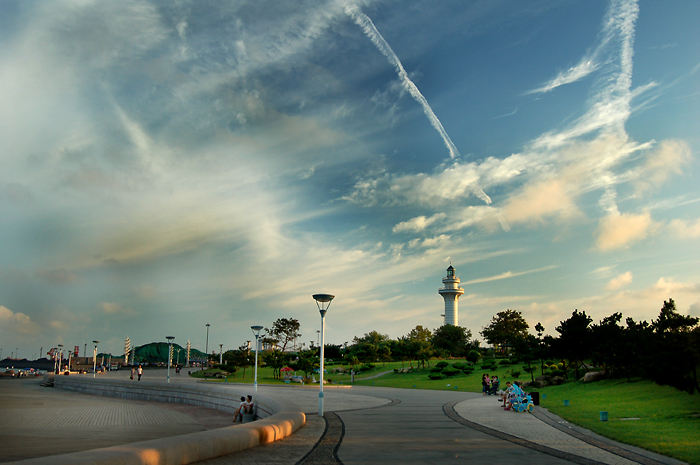
Dengta Lighthouse

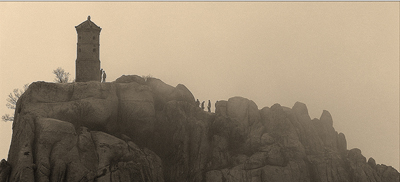
Wulian Mountain

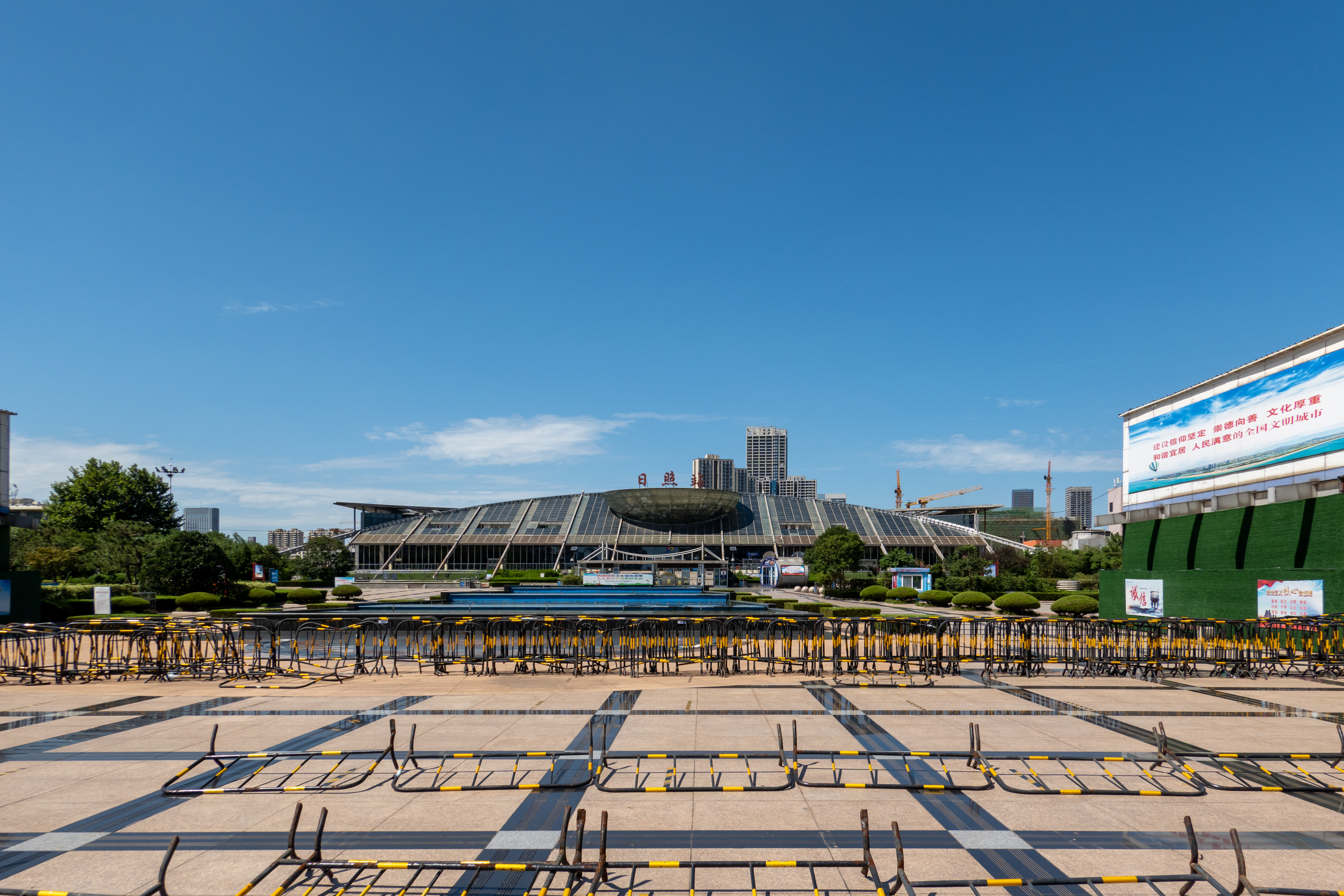
Rizhao Railway Station

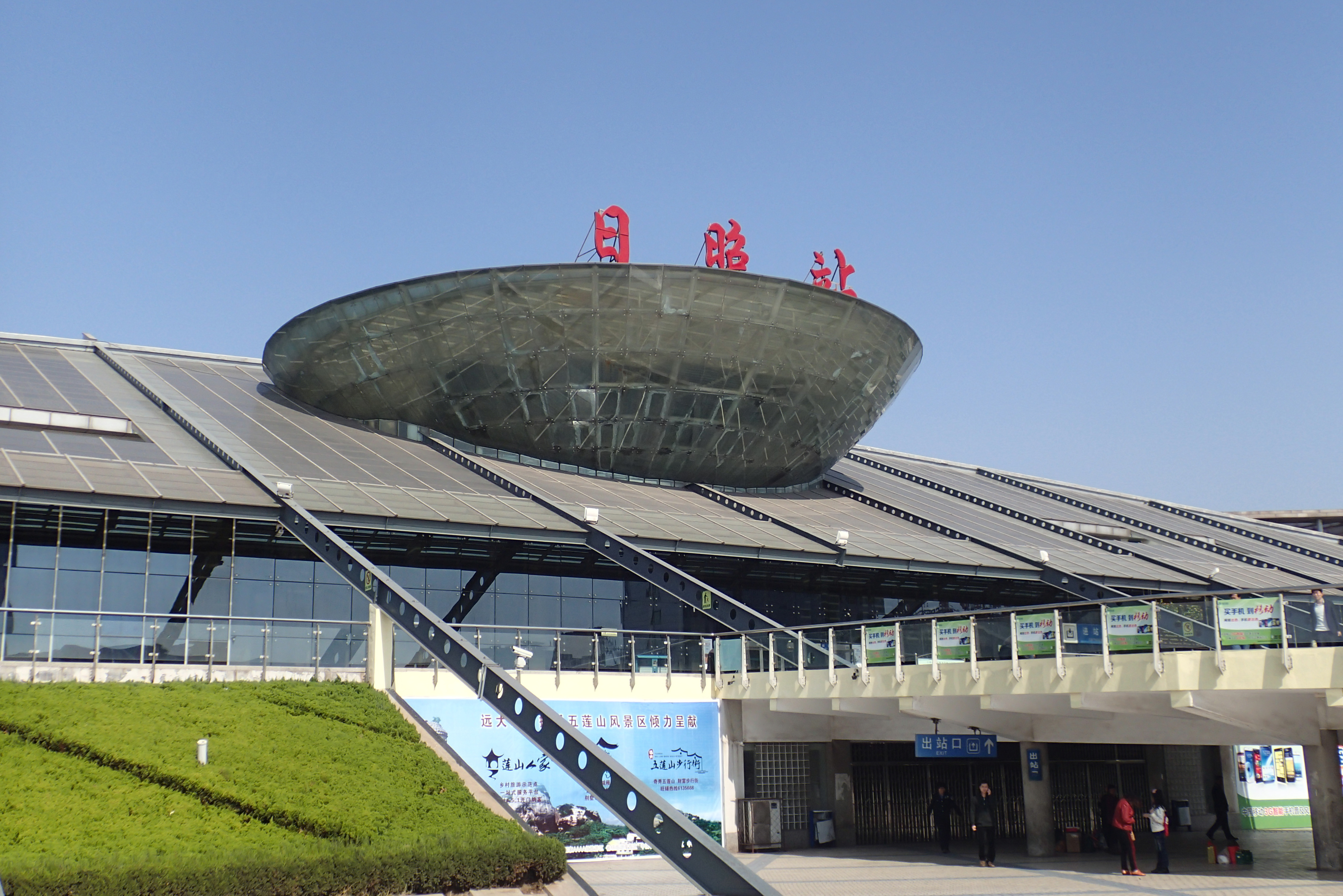
Rizhao Railway Station

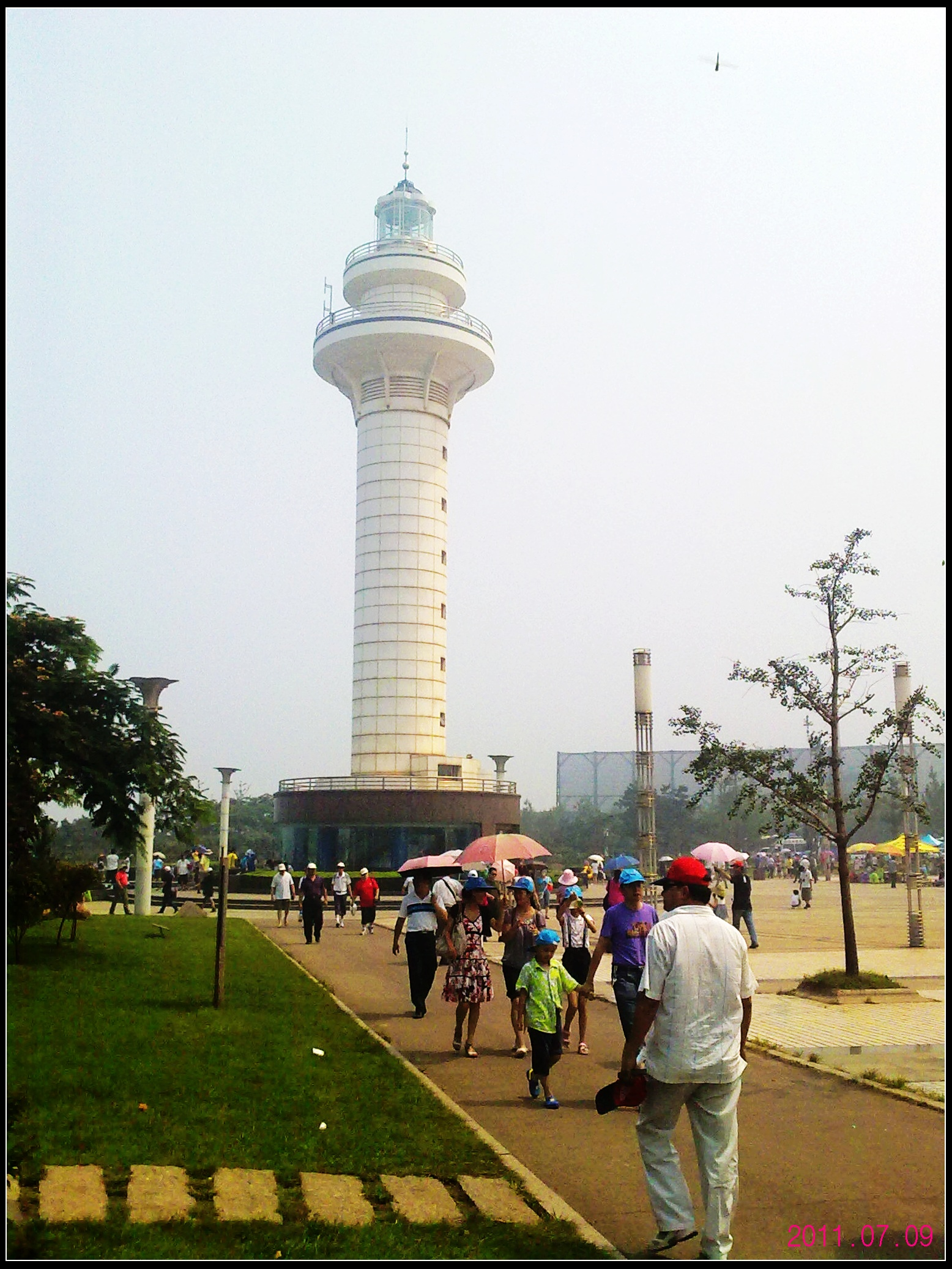
Rizhao Lighthouse

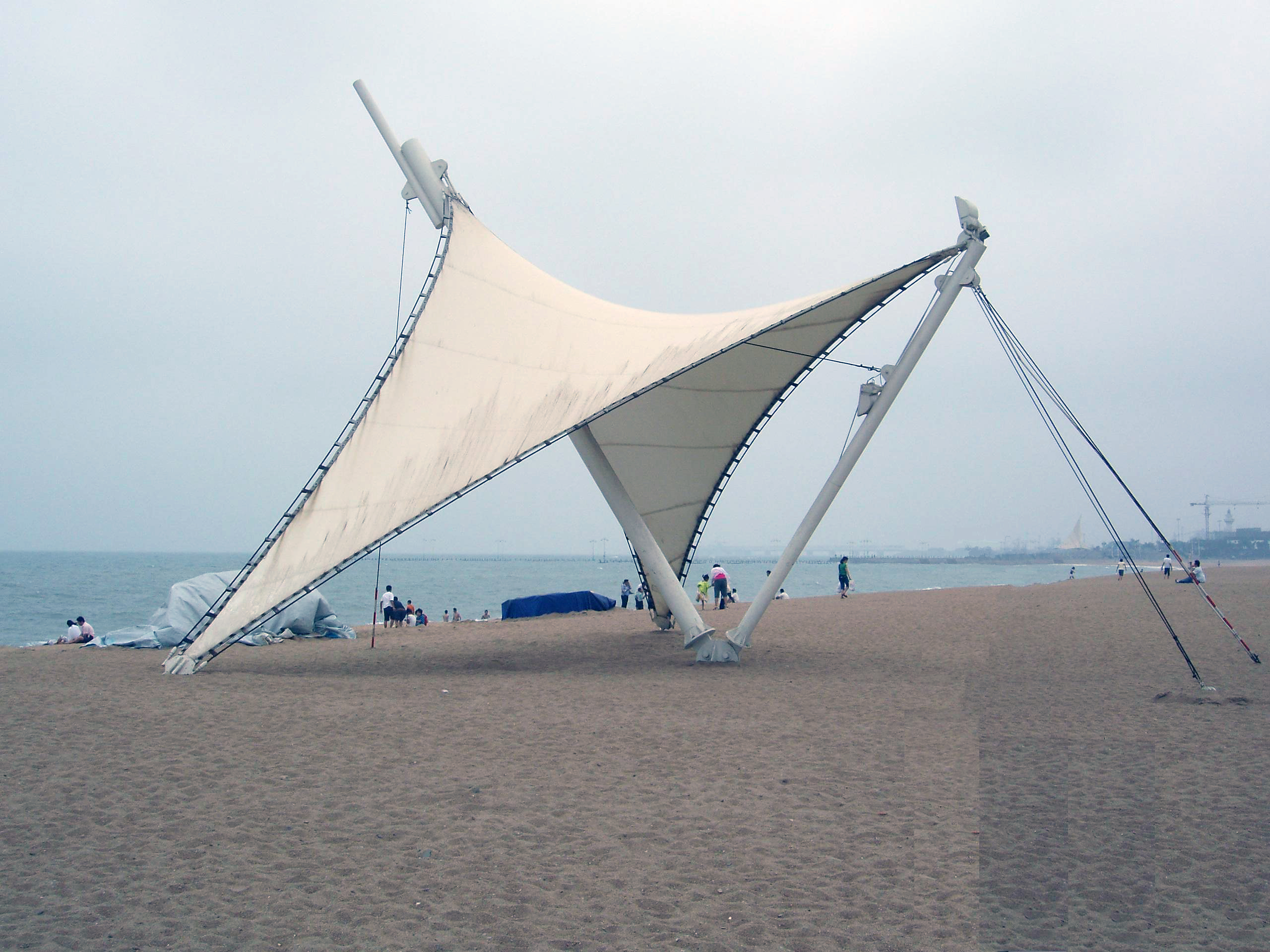
Rizhao scenery

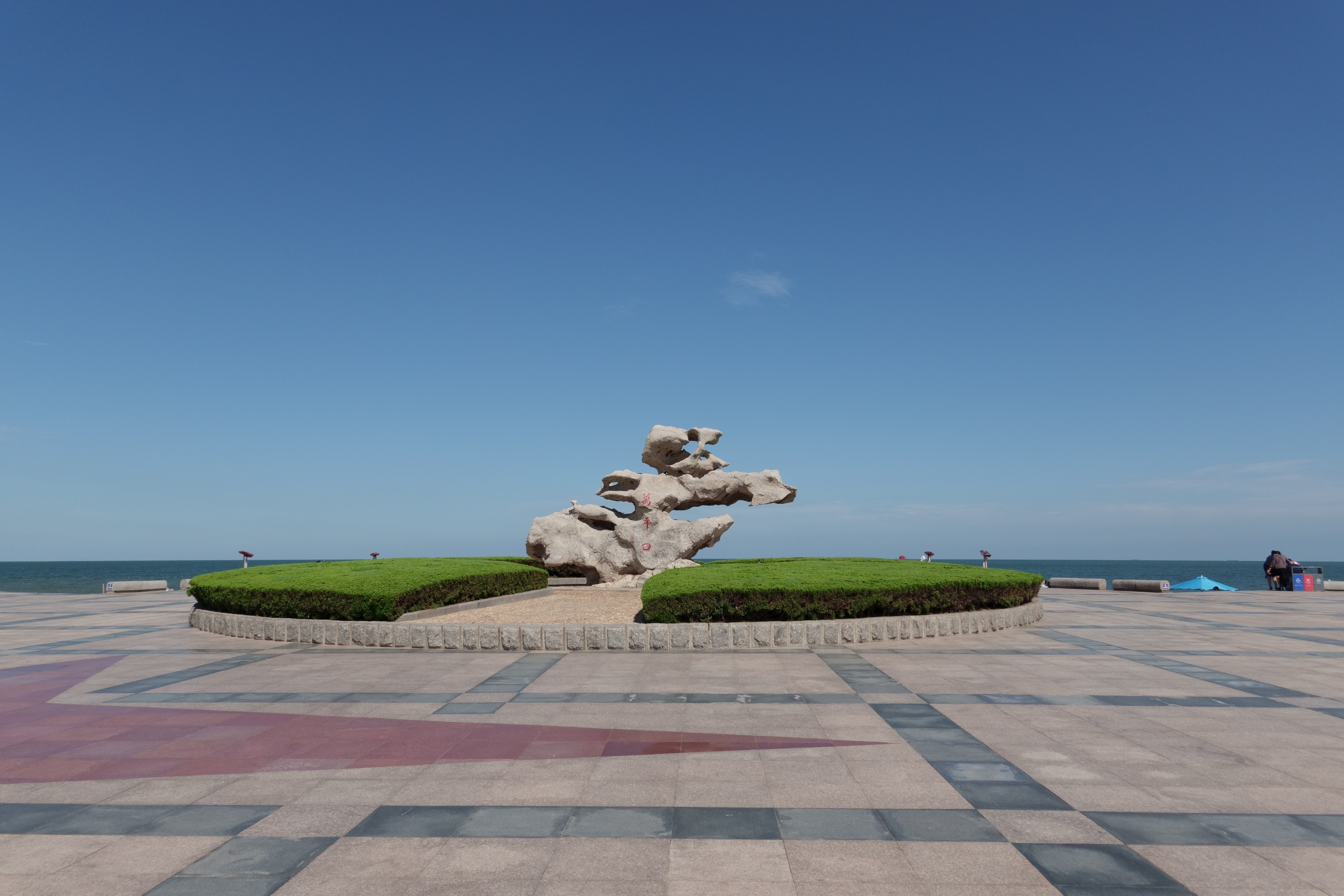
Rizhao Wanpingkou Ocean Park 2022

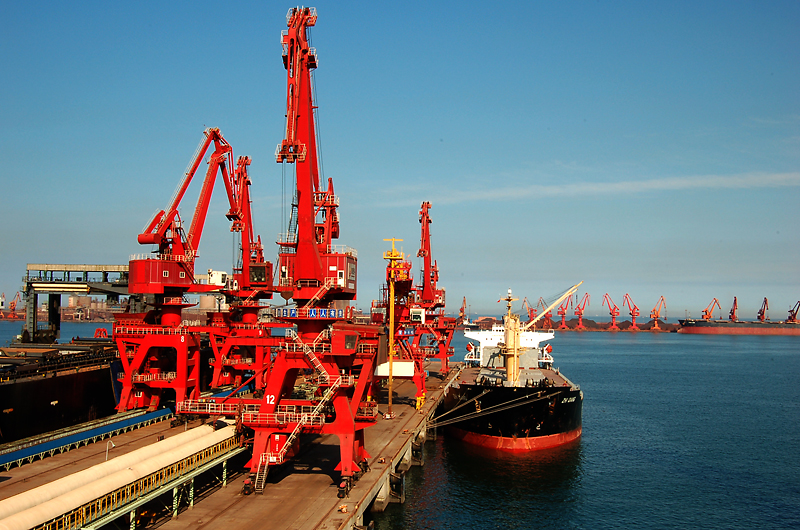
Rizhao sea port

== International relations ==
Rizhao has established twin towns and sister city relationships with several international partners.

| City | Country | Year |
|---|---|---|
| Trabzon | Turkey | 1991 |
| Muroran | Japan | 2002 |
| Gisborne | New Zealand | 2006 |
| Coatzacoalcos | Mexico | 2008 |
| Dangjin | South Korea | 2010 |
| Alhambra | United States | 2011 |
| Roebourne | Australia | 2014 |
| Türkmenabat | Turkmenistan | 2014 |
| Addis Ababa | Ethiopia | 2024 |

As of 2025, Rizhao has also formed friendly cooperation agreements with additional localities, such as Pakhtakor District (Uzbekistan, 2023) and Kovacica (Serbia, 2025), though these may differ from formal sister city status.
