= Qilu University of Technology =

Public university in Jinan, Shandong, China

- 齐鲁工业大学
- Logo of Qilu University of Technology
- Motto: 明德励志 崇实尚能
- Motto in English: Practice persistently and improve our ability for a moral aim
- Type: Public
- Established: 17 October 17 October 1948; 78 years ago
- President: Duan Peiyong
- Academic staff: 2,278 full-time teachers
- Students: 36,800+
- Location: Jinan, Shandong, China
- Campus: Multiple campuses and research sites; main campus in Changqing District
- Website: www.qlu.edu.cn

Qilu University of Technology
- Simplified Chinese: 齐鲁工业大学
- Traditional Chinese: 齊魯工業大學
Transcriptions
Standard Mandarin
- Hanyu Pinyin: Qílǔ Gōngyè Dàxué

Qilu University of Technology (Chinese: 齐鲁工业大学; pinyin: Qílǔ Gōngyè Dàxué; abbreviated as QLU), officially Qilu University of Technology (Shandong Academy of Sciences), is a public university and research institution headquartered in Jinan, Shandong, China. The institution is administered by the Shandong Provincial Government and combines higher education with scientific research through its integration with the Shandong Academy of Sciences.

The university traces its origins to the Jiaodong Industry School, founded in 1948 by the Jiaodong Military District of the People's Liberation Army. It was later known as the Shandong Institute of Light Industry from 1978 to 2013, before adopting its current name. In May 2017, Qilu University of Technology was integrated with the Shandong Academy of Sciences, whose predecessor was the Shandong Branch of the Chinese Academy of Sciences established in 1958.

As of the university's current profile, QLU has campuses or research institutions in Jinan, Qingdao, Jining, Heze and Dezhou, with its main campus located in the Changqing University Science Park in Jinan. It has 26 teaching and research institutions, 70 undergraduate enrolment majors, five first-level doctoral degree authorization disciplines, one professional doctoral degree authorization category, 18 first-level master's degree authorization disciplines, and 15 professional master's degree authorization categories.

== History ==
The origins of Qilu University of Technology date to 1948, when the Jiaodong Industry School was founded by the Jiaodong Military District. In 1978, the institution entered the period of the Shandong Institute of Light Industry, which became one of the earlier public undergraduate institutions in Shandong Province.

In 2013, the Shandong Institute of Light Industry was renamed Qilu University of Technology. In May 2017, Qilu University of Technology and the Shandong Academy of Sciences were integrated to form Qilu University of Technology (Shandong Academy of Sciences). The Shandong Academy of Sciences had been established in 1979, with origins in the Shandong Branch of the Chinese Academy of Sciences founded in 1958.

The integration created a combined university–academy system intended to link degree education, scientific research and technology transfer.

== Campus ==
QLU's main campus is located at No. 3501 Daxue Road in Changqing District, Jinan, within the Changqing University Science Park. The institution also operates campuses or research facilities in several other cities in Shandong, including Qingdao, Jining, Heze and Dezhou.

According to its official profile, the university has a total building area of about 1.53 million square metres and library holdings of about 2.89 million printed books and 1.24 million electronic books.

== Academics ==
Qilu University of Technology is a multidisciplinary institution covering engineering, science, literature, economics, management, law, medicine, art, education, agriculture and interdisciplinary subjects. The university offers 70 undergraduate enrolment majors and postgraduate programs through doctoral and master's degree authorization disciplines and professional degree categories.

The institution reports 26 teaching and research institutions and more than 36,800 full-time undergraduate students, graduate students and international students. It also reports 2,278 full-time teachers, including 1,127 with senior professional titles.

Several of the university's disciplines have entered the top 1% globally in the Essential Science Indicators database, including engineering, chemistry, materials science, agricultural sciences, environment and ecology, computer science, biology and biochemistry, and pharmacology and toxicology.

== Academic organization ==
Following the 2017 integration with the Shandong Academy of Sciences, the university operates through a combined system of academic divisions, schools, colleges and research institutes.

Its teaching and research units include the Division of Computer Science and Technology, Shandong Confidentiality College, the Division of Light Industry and the State Key Laboratory of Bio-based Materials and Green Papermaking, the Division of Mechanical Engineering, the Division of Electronic, Electrical and Control Engineering, the Division of Biological Engineering, the Division of Food Science and Engineering, the Division of Environmental Science and Engineering, the Division of Chemistry and Pharmaceuticals, the Division of Materials Science and Engineering, the Division of Mathematics and Artificial Intelligence, the Division of Optoelectronic Science and Technology, the Division of Energy and Power Engineering, the Division of Marine Technology Science, the Division of Economics and Management, the School of Art and Design, the School of Marxism, the School of Political Science and Law, the School of Foreign Languages and International Education, the School of Physical Education and Music, Kyiv College, the School of Continuing Education and the Heze campus.

== Research ==
Qilu University of Technology functions both as a university and as a provincial research academy. The university states that it hosts national-level and provincial- or ministerial-level research platforms in areas including papermaking, bio-based materials, supercomputing, engineering technology, international scientific cooperation and technology transfer.

Its official profile states that the institution has led the construction of 14 national-level platforms, including two national key laboratories, one national supercomputing center, one national engineering technology research center, one national-local joint engineering laboratory, three national international science and technology cooperation bases, one national demonstration base for talent introduction and intelligence, two national technology transfer demonstration institutions, one national achievement industrialization base and two Ministry of Education key laboratories.

The university publishes several academic journals, including the Journal of Qilu University of Technology, Science and Management, and Shandong Science.

== Rankings ==
Qilu University of Technology has appeared in several Chinese and international university rankings. In the 2025 Academic Ranking of World Universities, the university was ranked in the 601–700 band globally by ShanghaiRanking Consultancy.

In the 2025 Alumni Association Chinese University Ranking, Qilu University of Technology was ranked 89th nationally, 46th among science and engineering universities in China, and 4th among universities in Shandong Province.

In the 2025 ShanghaiRanking Best Chinese Subjects Ranking, the university's Computer Science and Technology discipline was ranked 25th nationally, placing it in the top 12% among listed institutions in that discipline. Its Light Industry Technology and Engineering discipline was ranked 4th nationally in the same ranking.

ShanghaiRanking also listed QLU in several Global Ranking of Academic Subjects tables, including Textile Science and Engineering, Food Science and Technology, Chemical Engineering, Instruments Science and Technology, Telecommunication Engineering, Nanoscience and Nanotechnology, Biotechnology, and Metallurgical Engineering.

== International cooperation ==
The university has established partnerships with universities, research institutes and enterprises in more than 50 countries and regions, according to its official profile. China Daily reported that, by 2019, QLU had developed cooperation with institutions in more than 40 countries and regions and had undertaken more than 220 international cooperation projects in the preceding five years.

The School of Chemistry and Chemical Engineering has participated in double-degree cooperation with Tampere University of Applied Sciences in Finland.

== Leadership ==
The current president of Qilu University of Technology is Duan Peiyong, who also serves as president of the Shandong Academy of Sciences. He was appointed president in August 2023.

== Key labs and disciplines ==
Label in this article	Lab	Major Funding Agency
KLPaper	Key Lab for Pulping and Paper Making	MOE (Ministry of Education of the People's Republic of China) and SD (Shandong)
KLmBio	Key Lab for Microbiological Engineering	SD
KLGlass	Key Lab for Glass and Ceramic Material	SD
KLAux	Key Lab for Auxiliary Agent for Light Industry	SD
KLAPCrystal	Key Lab for Amorphous/Polycrystal Material	SD
KLFineChem	Key Lab for Fine Chemicals in Light Industries	SD
KLAdvMan	Key Lab for Advanced Manufacturing-Monitoring-Controlling of Equipments in Light Industries	SD
KLClnMan	Key Lab for Clean manufacturing and Industrial Recycling	SD
KLMassProd	Key Lab for Information Technology for Mass-production	SD
KLfCeramic	Key Lab for Glass and Functional Ceramic Processing and Testing	SD
RBInnoSust	Research Base for Regional Innovation and Sustainable Development	SD

Key Discipline	Recognizing Agency
Pulping and Paper Making Engineering	SDEdu (Shandong Provincial Education Department http://www.sdedu.gov.cn)
Chemistry	SDEdu
Chemical Engineering	SDEdu
Fermentation Engineering	SDEdu
Leather Chemistry and Engineering	SDEdu
Art of Design	SDEdu
Material Physics and Chemistry	SDEdu
Mechanical Electronic Engineering	SDEdu
Polymer Chemistry and Physics	SDEdu
Food Technology	SDEdu
Study of Cultural Propagation	SDEdu

== Schools and departments ==
School	Department	Key Lab	Key Discipline
School of Science			
School of Material Science and Engineering			
School of Chemistry and Chemical Engineering			
School of Light Chemical Industry and Environmental Engineering		KLPaper	
School of Food Technology and Bioengineering			
School of Information			
School of Mechanical Engineering and Automobile Engineering			
School of Electrical Engineering and Automation			
School of Finance			
School of Foreign Langues			
School of Arts			
School of Literature and School of Law			
School of Business			
School of Physical Education and Cultural Industry			
School of Adult Education			

=== The School of Chemistry and Chemical Engineering ===
The School of Chemistry and Chemical Engineering (SCCE) is one of the initial founded faculty in Qilu University of Technology. In nowadays, it includes five different subjects, which are: Chemistry, Chemical Engineering, Applied Chemistry, Pharmaceutic Preparation and Energetic Engineering. The SCCE has about 150 lecturers and researchers, including 22 professors, 46 associate professors. The students are subordinated in Jinan and Heze campus and in total there are 2400 bachelor students and over 200 master students.

The School of Chemistry and Chemical Engineering attaches great importance to the international education and cooperation. It has been worked close with international universities closely in the field of education and academic research. In 2012, the first international class, which is under the subject of Applied Chemistry, has been found. The international class was firstly cooperated with Saimaa University of Applied Sciences in Finland and then transferred to Tampere University of Applied Sciences. Most of the graduate students have successfully applied for the master/Ph.D. degree programs in Finland, Sweden, Denmark, the US and so on.

== History ==
Year	Event Type	Event
1948	Origin	Jiaodong School of Industry (胶东工业学校) was established by the Jiaodong Military District of PLA.
1978	Upgrade	Shandong Institute of Light Industry (SDILI) was established based on the Shandong School of Light Industry (SLI1). An independent and new Shandong School of Light Industry (SLI2) was established in 1990 for vocational education.
1982	Role	SDILI was added by the central government of China into the first batch of colleges/universities that are authorized to release bachelor's degrees.
1987	Publication	"Academic Journal of Shandong Institute of Light Industry" started its publication.
1992	Role	"Technology Base for National Project on Science and Technology Fruits Converting" was labeled by the National Science and Technology Committee onto SDILI.
1996	Conference	The 4th International Conference on Beer and Beverage Technology was held by SDILI.
1997	Conference	The 1st Qilu International Conference on New Technologies of Pulping and Paper Making was held by SDILI.
1998	Role	SDILI was authorized to release master's degrees.
1998	Merge	Shandong School of Light Industry (SLI2) and Shandong School of Banking were merged into SDILI.
2003	Campus	The land of the new campus in Changqing was purchased by SDILI.
2012	Role	SDILI was listed as the first batch of colleges/universities to be highly supported by Shandong province.
2013	Name	"Qilu University of Technology" (QLUT) was set as the new name of SDILI aiming its new phase of development.
2013	Conference	The 9th International Conference on Beer and Beverage Technology
2014	Role	QLUT Technology Converting Center was labeled "National Exemplar Institution for Technology Converting"

== See also ==
- List of universities in China
- List of universities and colleges in Shandong
