= Rizhao Polytechnic =

College in Rizhao, Shandong, China

Rizhao Polytechnic (simplified Chinese: 日照职业技术学院; traditional Chinese: 日照職業技術學院; pinyin: Rìzhào Zhíyè Jìshù Xuéyuàn), colloquially known as Rizhi (日职), is a public institution for tertiary education in Rizhao, Shandong province, China, specializing in engineering and technical majors. The college has around 14,000 students and 900 teachers and is located north of the University City in Donggang District.
