= Shandong Vocational and Technical University of International Studies =

University in Rizhao, China

- 山东外国语职业技术大学 (Chinese)
- Type: Private
- Established: 2005
- Students: ~6,000
- Location: Rizhao, Shandong, China
- Nickname: Shanwai (山外)
- Website: swut.cn

Chinese name
- Simplified Chinese: 山东外国语职业技术大学
- Traditional Chinese: 山東外國語職業技術大學
Transcriptions
Standard Mandarin
- Hanyu Pinyin: Shāndōng Wàiguóyǔ Zhíyè Jìshù Dàxué

Shandong Vocational and Technical University of International Studies (Chinese: 山东外国语职业技术大学), formerly Shandong Foreign Languages Vocational College, is a private university in Rizhao, Shandong province, China. It has its campus to the north of the University City in Donggang District. Though the focus of the school is foreign languages, it also offers majors in other disciplines.

== History ==
The university was a joint venture, with most of the investment hailing from Xi'an. Having received approval by the government in 2005, the college is one of the newest in Shandong. In 2013, it was named Shandong Foreign Languages College (山东外国语学院) and offered Bachelor degrees in certain subjects in addition to the already existing Associate degrees.

Main Teaching Building and Library of the College

== Administration ==
=== Faculties ===
At present, it has the following five faculties:

- College of Foreign Languages
- College of Economic Management
- College of Information Engineering
- College of International Business
- College of Continuing Education
