= Life release =

Buddhist practice

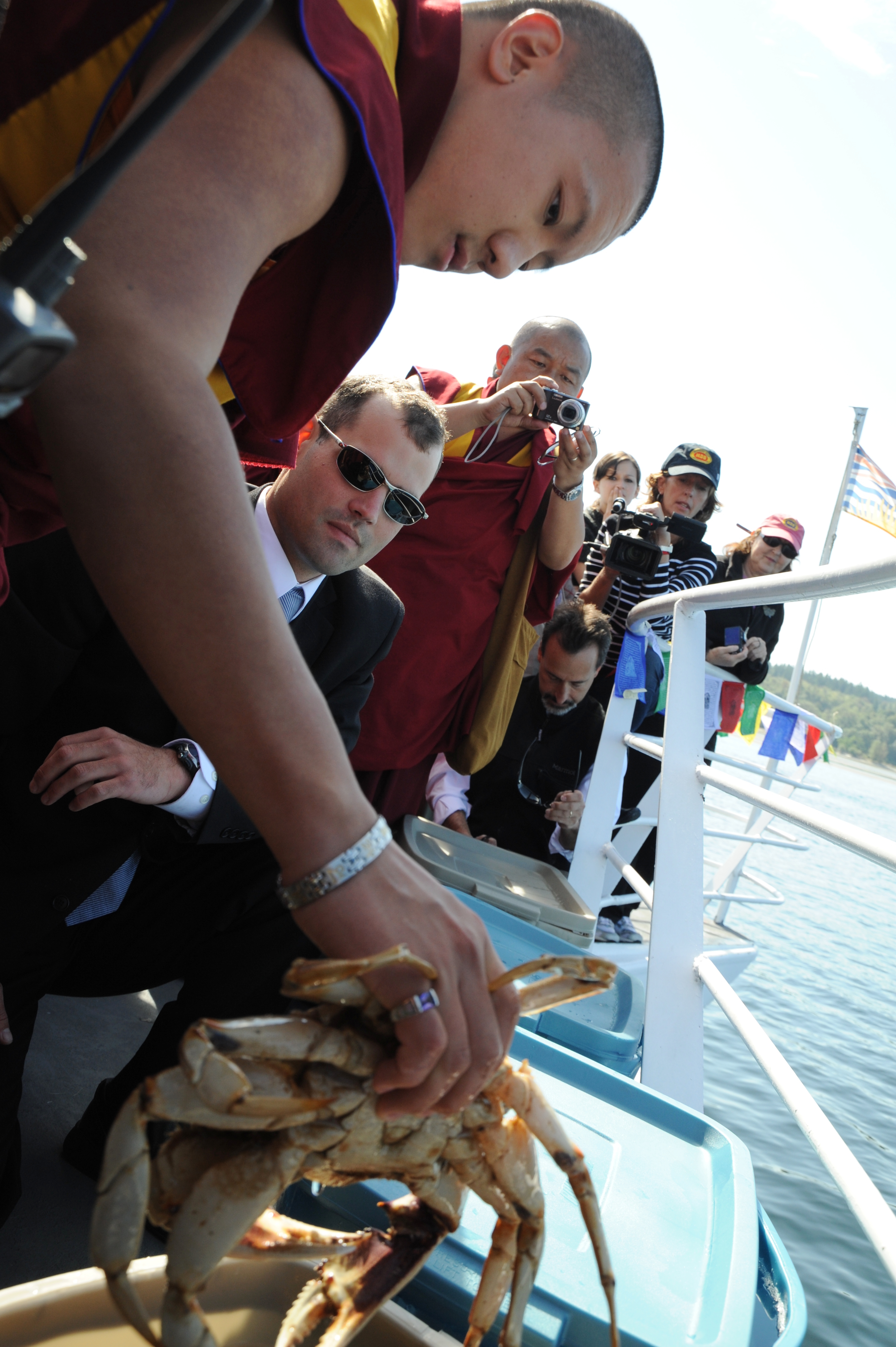
Dilgo Khyentse Yangsi Rinpoche blessing a Canadian crab prior to release

Life release, also known as merit release, mercy release, fangsheng (from Chinese 放生) or prayer animal release, is a Buddhist practice of releasing animals held captive with the presumed intention of saving their lives, if they were destined for slaughter, or of giving them back their freedom, as animals nowadays are commonly sold with the explicit purpose to be released for making merit, along with gaining personal merit, or good luck, by performing the act. This practise is performed by all schools of Buddhism: Theravada, Mahayana and Vajrayana. It is known as "Tsethar" in Tibetan Buddhism.

With the popularization of environmental protection knowledge in modern times, researchers and some members of religious communities have started to realize that improper life release can damage the ecological environment, cause invasive species, and lead to the death of released animals that do not adapt to the environment. In order to avoid the harm of improper life release, Buddhists advocate that vegetarianism is the best way of releasing life from the mouth.

== History ==
Life release has been practised at least since the 3rd century. It is assumed to have been a Taoist or an indigenous Chinese cultural practice according to the first record of the practice in the 3rd century CE, before being adopted by Chinese Buddhists in the 4th or 5th century CE. It subsequently took root in Tibet, Japan, Korea, Sri Lanka, Thailand, Cambodia, Vietnam, Myanmar and Taiwan. It has been performed in Japan since 676, where it is called Hōjō-e.

While this practise of life release may naturally need to be spontaneous to successfully save an endangered life, life release can also be planned. Planning often involves purchasing an animal directly from a slaughterhouse or a fishermen; this can often take place on auspicious days in the Buddhist calendar in order for the merit of the act to be multiplied thousands of times. Animals are blessed before being safely returned to their natural environment as prayers are made and often dedicated to someone who is ill or has died, with the belief that person will benefit too from this dedication.

In Tibet an animal is often marked by a ribbon to indicate that the life of the animal has been liberated, with the general understanding that it will be allowed to die of natural causes. The practise in Tibetan Buddhism has been championed in recent times by Chatral Rinpoche, Dilgo Khyentse Yangsi Rinpoche and Ogyen Trinley Dorje. Although this is seen to be the traditional way of carrying out this practise, Ogyen Trinley Dorje has commented that the meaning is broad and that people can use their intelligence to expand the practise in other ways; indicating that planting one tree may be more beneficial that carrying out Tsethar for many beings.

Today, life release involves many types of animal, including birds, reptiles, fish, and mammals, and involves hundreds of millions of individual animals each year.

== Criticism ==
It is increasingly recognized that animal release has the potential for negative environmental impacts, including as a pathway for the introduction of invasive species into non-native environments. This may lead to biodiversity loss over time. For example, competition from American red-eared slider turtles released in China's and Japan's lakes has been reported to cause death of native turtles.

Further, some animals are captured for the explicit purpose of being released, or are released into environments where they are unable to survive. The release of cats near a reservoir in China has led to the death of many of the cats.

Two Buddhists that released hundreds of non-native crustaceans off the English coast in 2015 were fined more than £28,000 for violating the Wildlife and Countryside Act 1981, with the Marine Management Organisation placing bounties on the crustaceans released.

To avoid the dangers of improper release of life, some Buddhists advocate that saving sentient beings is a form of charity. They emphasize not to mistreat animals and to adopt a vegan lifestyle (root cause release), although not every person who practices release is vegan. Non-vegans, when slaughtering animals, try to minimize their suffering. Before the rise of modern humane slaughter methods, ancient Dharmic religions practiced a method called Jhatka (in Punjabi: ਝਟਕਾ, in Hindi: झटका), where animals were not to be frightened before slaughter. The method involved using a sharp knife or axe to swiftly sever the animal's head, allowing for a quick and relatively painless death.

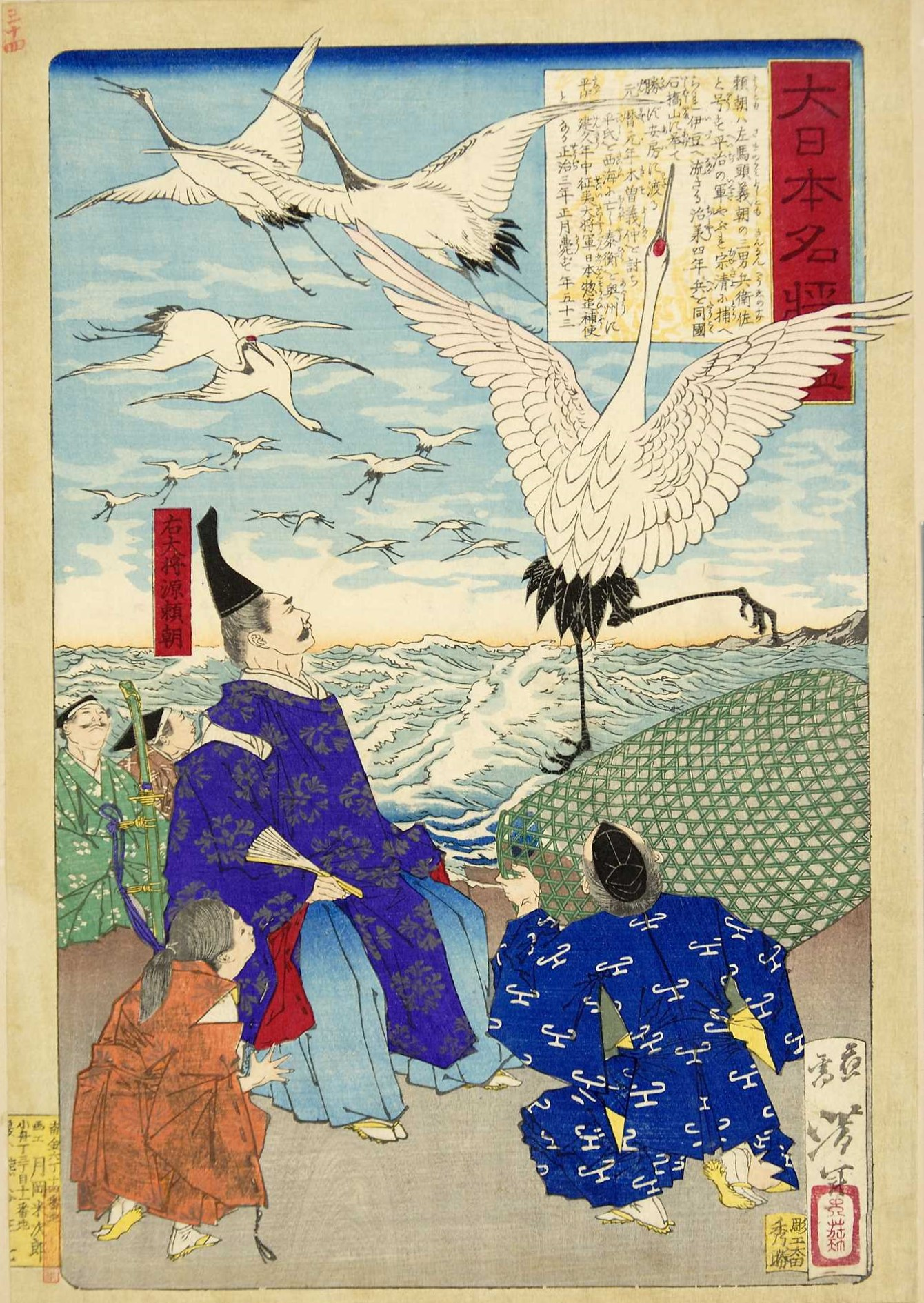
Minamoto no Yoritomo released one thousand cranes.

== See also ==
- Fangsheng pond
- Dhammika Sutta
- Dīghajāṇu Sutta
- Five precepts
- Merit release
- Sigālovāda Sutta
- Transfer of merit
- Vessantara Jātaka
