= Port of Rizhao =

Coordinates: 35°23′00″N 119°33′30″E

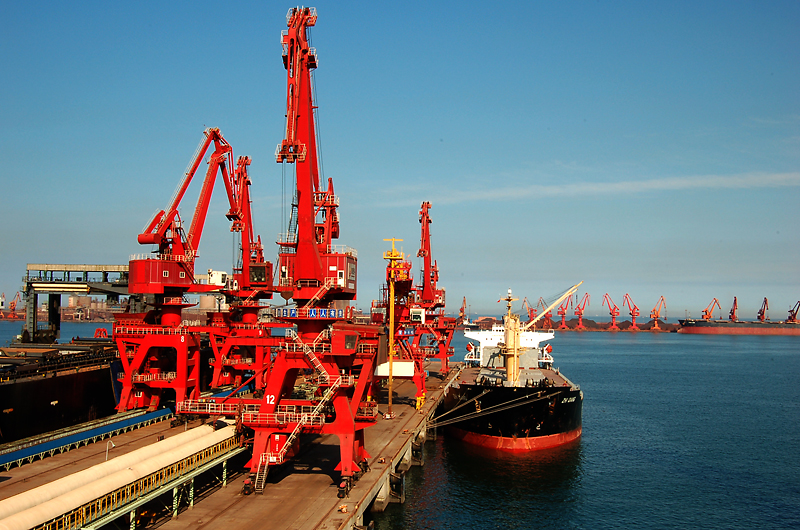
- Port of Rizhao

Location
- Location: Donggang District, Rizhao, Shandong Province, China

Details
- Type of harbour: Natural Deep-water Seaport
- No. of berths: 46 (2012）

Statistics
- Annual cargo tonnage: 284,000,000 metric tons (2012)
- Website; Port of Rizhao website

The Port of Rizhao is a natural deep-water seaport on the coast of the city of Rizhao, Shandong Province, People's Republic of China, located on the southern shore of Shandong Peninsula, opening to the Yellow Sea. It has 46 deep-water berths in two main port areas (Lanzhao Port Area and Shijiu Port Area). In 2012 it reached a throughput of 284 million metric tons, making it the tenth-busiest port in China.
