= Fangsheng pond =

Type of Buddhist temple pond

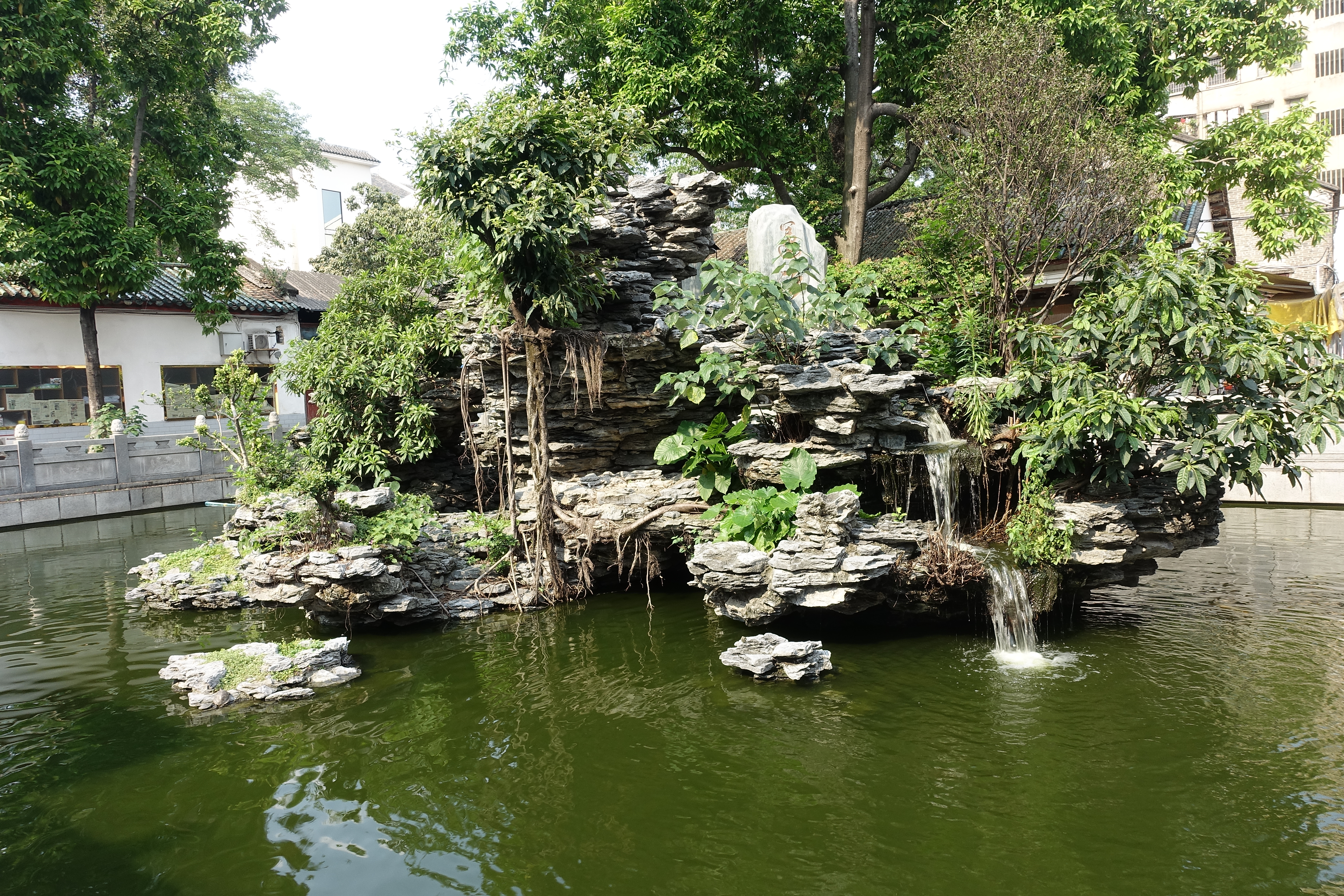
- The fangsheng pond at Guangxiao Temple in Guangzhou, China.

Chinese name
- Chinese: 放生池
- Literal meaning: Pond(s) for the Release of Living [Things]
Transcriptions
Standard Mandarin
- Hanyu Pinyin: fàngshēngchí
- Wade–Giles: fang-sheng-ch'ih

Japanese name
- Kanji: 放生池
- Hiragana: ほうじょうち ほうしょうち
Transcriptions
- Romanization: hōjōchi hōshōchi

A fangsheng pond, also known by myriad other names, is a type of pond at Chinese or Japanese Buddhist temples. It is usually located in front of the shanmen (main gate) or the Hall of Four Heavenly Kings. Copying Buddhist use, similar ponds sometimes appear in Taoist and Shinto temples as well. Within Buddhist temples, the fangsheng pond is used for ritual 'freeing' of fish, birds, and other animals—usually purchased from fishermen or at local markets—in order to accrue merit owing to Chinese Buddhism's focus on compassion towards all living beings.

== Names ==
The Chinese name 放生池, pronounced fàngshēngchí in Mandarin, literally refers to a pond or pool of water (池) used for the release, liberation, or freeing (放) of a life or some living thing (生). The concept has been translated and glossed in a wide variety of ways: life release pond, releasing-life pond, life releasing pond, pond for releasing life, pond for releasing living creatures, pond for releasing living beings, liberation pond, pond for the liberation of animals, pool of liberating life, ponds for setting lives free, fish-freeing pond, etc.

In Japanese contexts, such ponds are known as hōshō or hōjō ponds from the Japanese pronunciation of the same characters as the Chinese name.

== History ==
The practice of releasing captured animals for merit began to develop within Chinese Buddhism from the late 3rd century.

Fangsheng ponds were first mentioned in later editions of the early 5th-century Treatise on the Great Wisdom. It relates that Buddhists of Shandong ("Qi") were robbed and fled to Jiankang (Nanjing) in Jiande 6 (ad 577). Losing their oars and shipwrecked in a storm, they were supposedly miraculously saved by a giant tortoise. As one monk praised Amitābha, the tortoise reminded them of their own previous care of him at the fangsheng pond at Haiqu (Rizhao). When the Xuan Emperor of the Northern Zhou dynasty heard the story from the monks a few years later, he established the Temple of Repaying Kindness (報恩寺, Bào'ēnsì) in commemoration. The c. 1163 Yunlu Manchao (《雲麓漫抄》) of the Song scholar Zhao Yanwei (趙彥衛) quotes an otherwise lost passage in the c. 743 Zhuanji (《傳記》) of the Tang scholar Liu Su (劉餗) stating that the Wu Emperor of Liang (r. 502–549) had earlier ordered the construction of such "ponds of longevity" (長命池, chángmìngchí), a claim supported by known accounts of the emperor's promotion of Buddhism and protection of animals to such an extreme that he became known as the "Bodhisattva Emperor". It is extremely likely that a fangsheng pond was established under the Sui dynasty (589–618) by Zhiyi (d. 597), founder of the Tiantai school, as numerous sources including one from his immediate disciple Guanding claim he not only established one after the model of local Zhejiang fishermen but even lectured to the liberated fish on the Diamond and Golden Light Sutras.

Fangsheng ponds are attested at Buddhist temples with historical certainty from the early Tang dynasty. In 759, Emperor Suzong of the Tang ordered all Buddhist temples to set up fangsheng ponds. According to the Duobaomingjing (多宝名经; 多寶名經), 81 Buddhist temples set up ponds in accordance with the emperor's order.

Fangsheng was particularly popular under the Song. The Tiantai monk Ciyun Zunshi (慈雲尊式, Cíyún Zūnshì, 964–1032) petitioned Song emperors to make West and South Lake into fangsheng ponds and composed a ritual for the release of living things into a pond comprising an initial narrative, a blessing of the pond's water, a petition, declaration of refuge, recitation of Buddha's name, sermon on dharma, and the recitation of 7 chapters of repentances and oaths. In 1017, Emperor Zhenzong not only provided for restoration of monastic fangsheng ponds but also declared the animals of a wide stretch of the Huai River protected by imperial edict.

== Function ==
The fangsheng ponds were understood to improve air quality and to inhibit dust, but were also used for fire prevention. When fires occurred at temples, they were traditionally used as a reservoir to help extinguish the fire.

== See also ==
- Life release (fangsheng)
