= Yantai University =

University in China

- 烟台大学
- Motto: 守信 求实 好学 力行
- Motto in English: Be trustworthy, be down-to-earth, be fond of learning, and practice earnestly
- Type: Public
- Established: July 1984; 42 years ago
- Location: Laishan, Yantai, China; 37.476°N 121.454°E
- Campus: Yantai University 32 Qingquan Avenue Yantai Shandong 264005 China
- Website: http://www.ytu.edu.cn/ http://en.ytu.edu.cn/

Yantai University (Chinese: 烟台大学) is a key public university in Yantai, Shandong, China, and is the first batch of universities under the Shandong Province Famous University Project. It was founded in 1984 with the assistance of two C9 league members (Peking University and Tsinghua University).

As of June 2022, Yantai University (Laishan District campus) covered an area of 2,100 mu (about 140 hectares), with a total floor area of 1,019,800 square meters and teaching and research instruments and equipment valued at 602 million yuan. The Yantai University (Development Zone) Science and Education Park is located in the Bajiaowan Central Innovation District of Yantai, and the project covers a total area of over 1,000 mu. The university has 23 schools, 75 research institutes, and offers 58 undergraduate majors for enrollment; it is authorized to confer master's degrees in 23 first-level disciplines and in 14 categories of professional master's degrees; it has 1,726 full-time teaching staff and a total of over 30,000 full-time undergraduate students, graduate students, and international students.

== History ==
Yantai University was established as a modern comprehensive university along the coast in Yantai, in July 1984, from a generous bequest by Zhang Chengxian (Chinese: 张承先). Zhang Chengxian was appointed the first president.

== Overview ==
Yantai University's motto is 'to be honest, modest and natural'. Its coat of arms is constituted by a dolphin and ocean flows, designating intellectual and mind-opening respectively. The majority of students registering in Yantai University are Shandong natives.

In 2008, the university had 21 faculties and provides 49 programs covering arts, law, science, education, management, medicine, music, engineering, continuing education, international culture.

The university library serves the community with 1,680,000 physical books and 700,000 electronic items.

=== International education ===
Yantai University has stable communication with academic institutes in the United Kingdom, Canada, Norway, Australia, Korea, Germany, and the United States. Each year, about 500 international students accept their admissions from Yantai University. A number of teachers from the United States, United Kingdom, and Canada are working for the university. It is also home to international students who are studying Chinese language.

== Geography ==
The university is along the coast and a 25-minute bus ride from downtown on No. 7 or No. 10, both of which terminate outside the railway station and are close to one of the several long-distance bus stations in the city. The Coal College now named Shandong Institute is no more than a 15-minute walk from the university's north gate.

== Gallery ==
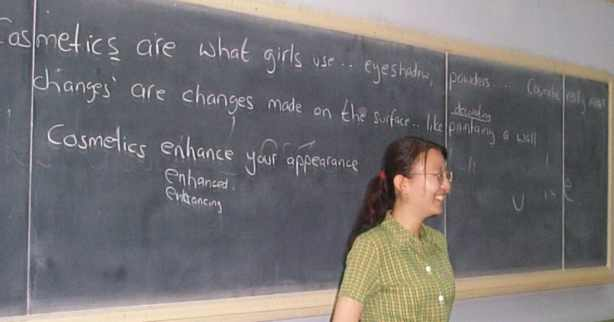
An English teacher is explaining new words.

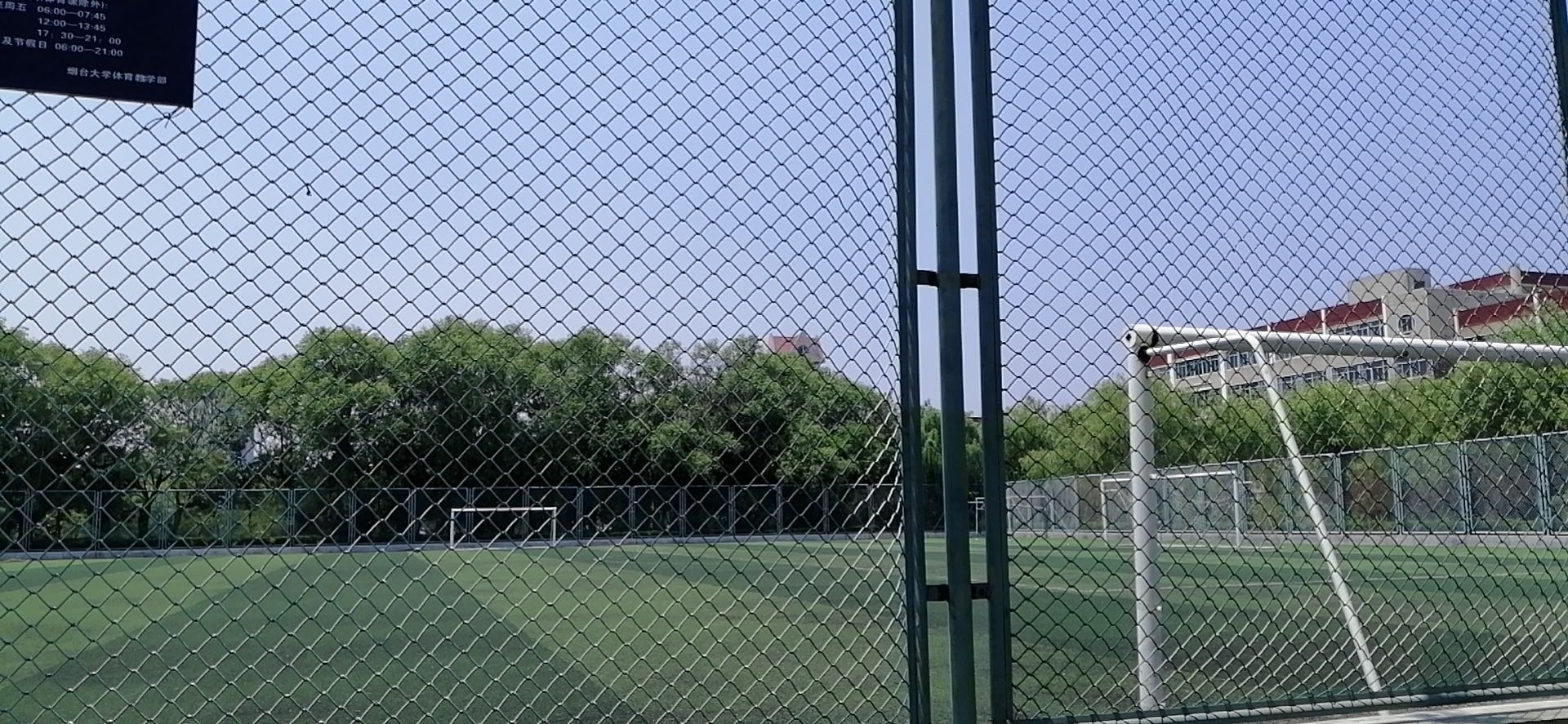
Yantai University playground.

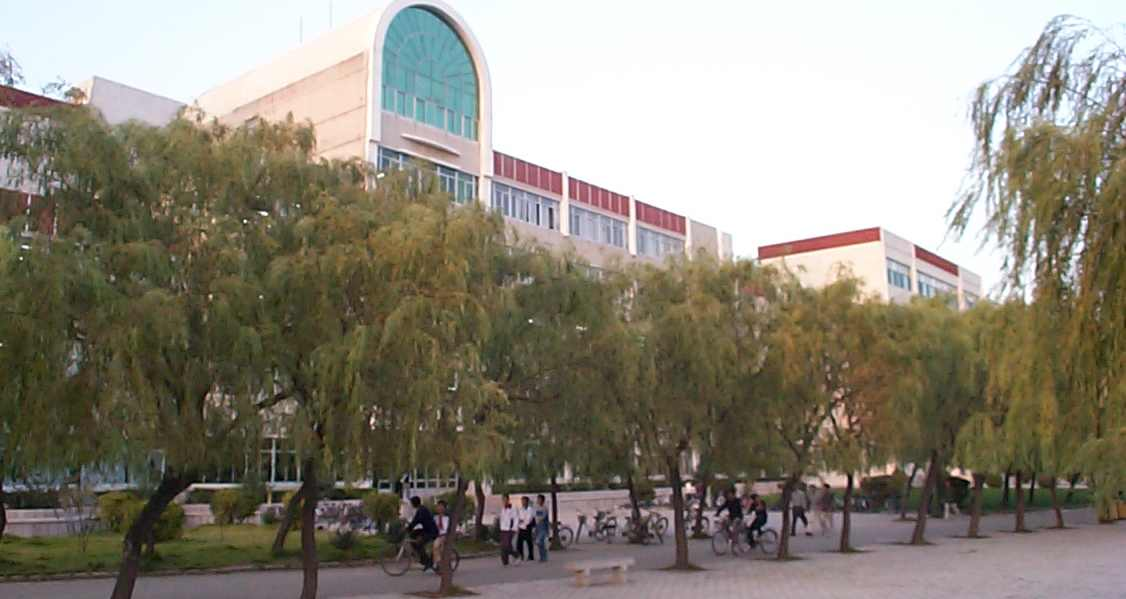
Yantai University view.

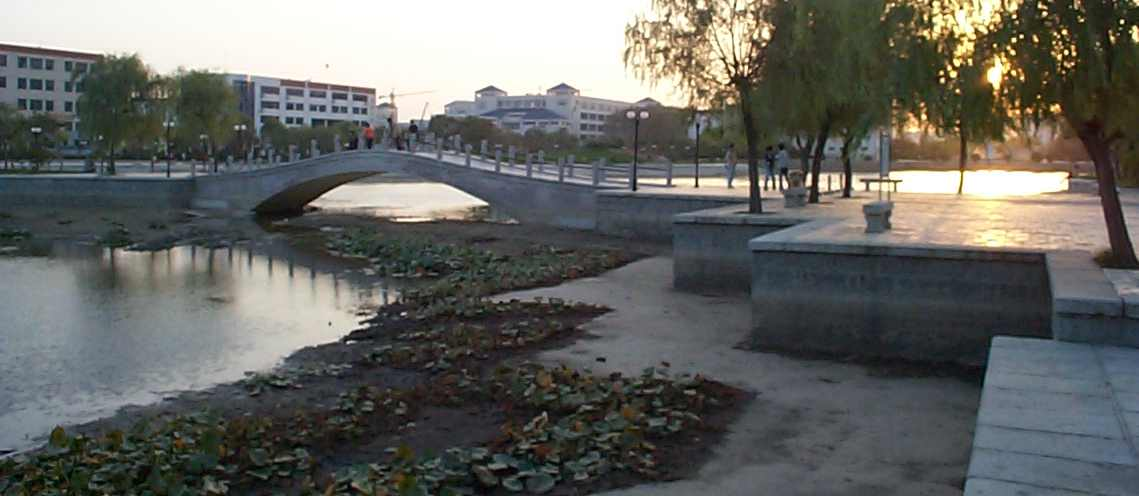
Yantai University.

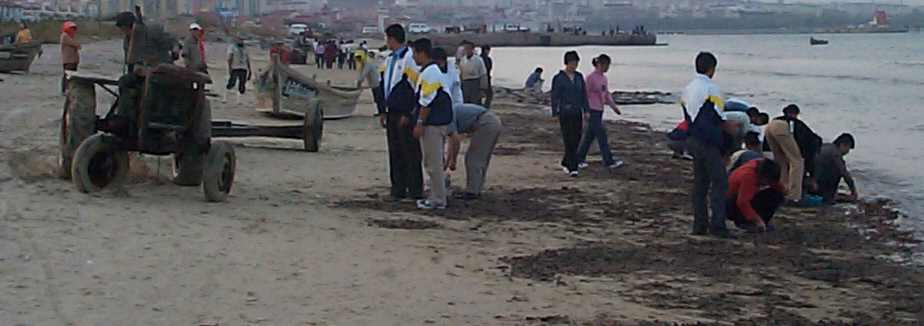
Students on the beach of the university.

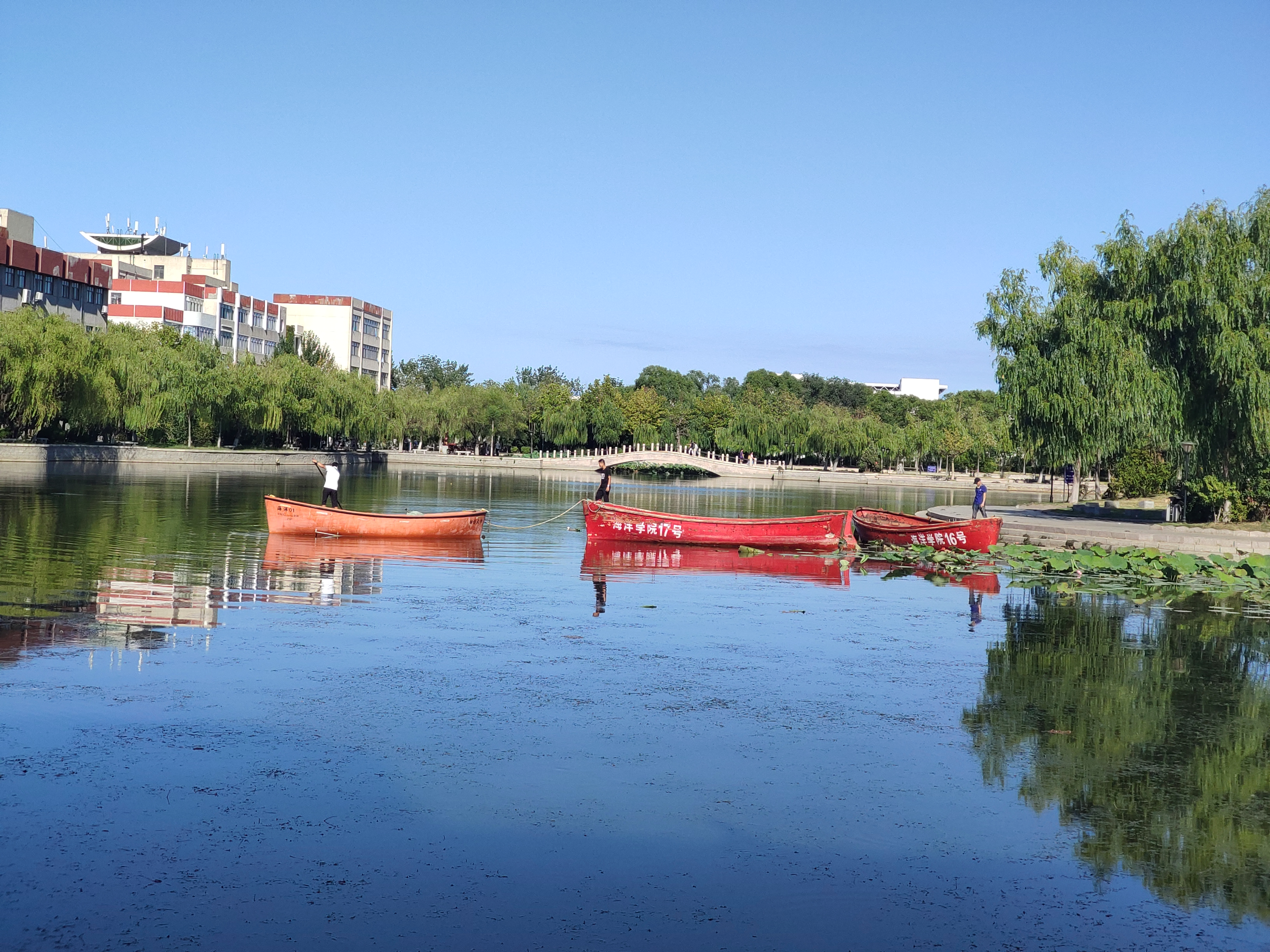
Lake of Yantai University
