= Qingdao University of Technology =

University in Qingdao, China

- 青岛理工大学
- Motto: Rigorous, Industrious, Pragmatical, Creative
- Type: Public
- Established: 1953 (as Qingdao Institute of Architecture and Engineering), 1985 (as Qingdao Building Engineering College), University status granted in 2004
- President: Zhang Kai
- Faculty: 2,232
- Students: 29,700 (28,600 graduate, 1,100 post-graduate)
- Location: Qingdao, Shandong, China; 36.050°N 120.021°E
- Campus: Sifang, Huangdao, Linyi
- Website: www.qtech.edu.cn

Qingdao University of Technology (QUT; simplified Chinese: 青岛理工大学; traditional Chinese: 青島理工大學; pinyin: Qīngdǎo Lǐgōng Dàxué), formerly known as Qingdao Technological University,is a key provincial comprehensive university in Qingdao, Shandong, China. It offers programs in civil, mechanical, and environmental engineering. The university is part of Plan 111 and Outstanding Engineer Education and Training Program.

== Location ==
Qingdao University of Technology operates three campuses: Huangdao, Shibei, and Linyi, covering a total area of approximately 1.61 million square meters with a built area of about 1.09 million square meters. The main Campus, located at 777 Jialingjiang East Road, Huangdao District, Qingdao City, Shandong Province, spans 1,320 acres with a planned construction area of 500,000 square meters

== History ==
The university was founded in 1953 as the Qingdao Institute of Architecture. In 1960 it was renamed Shandong Metallurgy College. It was placed under the administration of the Provincial Education Department in 1998. In 2004, it was granted full University status.

== Programs ==
QTech offers Bachelor and Master degrees in a variety of studies in Engineering science, Business management, Economics, Arts, and Law. The university organizes language courses and adult education programs.

Doctoral programs include Mechanical Design and Theory, Structural Engineering, Soil Engineering, Environmental Engineering, Heating, Gas Supplying Ventilation and Air-conditioning Engineering.

=== Rankings ===
As of 2025, Qingdao University of Technology is ranked 202nd in the China University Alumni Association (CUAA) Rankings and 210th in the ShanghaiRanking China University Rankings. In the 2025 U.S. News & World Report World University Rankings, it is placed 155th in China and 1111th globally. Additionally, it holds the 2014th position in the ESI International Rankings.

== Administration ==
=== International cooperation ===
Universities that have a partnership agreement with the Qingdao Technological University include:

- Illinois Institute of Technology (United States)
- Wentworth Institute of Technology (USA)
- Montclair State University (USA)
- Brock University (Canada)
- British Columbia Institute of Technology (Canada)
- Charles Darwin University (Australia)
- Greenwich University (United Kingdom)
- Saint Petersburg State University of Architecture and Civil Engineering (Russia)
- University of Karlsruhe (Germany)
- University of Applied Sciences Northwest Switzerland (Switzerland)
- Royal Institute of Technology (Sweden)
- Kyushu University (Japan)
- Kwangwoon University (South Korea)
- Sejong University (South Korea)
- Semyung University (South Korea)
- Silla University (South Korea)
- Hannan University (South Korea)

== Affiliated schools ==
Badge of Qindao College

Qindao College of Qingdao Technological University (青岛理工大学琴岛学院) is an independent college founded by the QTech in 2004. It is in Chengyang district of Qingdao, adjacent to Mount Lao. The campus encompasses 700.000 square meters with a floor are of 519.000 square meters. The college hosts eight faculties that offer Associate degrees as well as Bachelor studies. More than 16.700 students attend the college (+ more than 300 foreign students per year).

=== Faculties ===
- School of Civil Engineering
- School of Mechanical and Electrical Engineering
- School of Computer Sciences
- School of Accounting
- School of Economics and Trade
- School of Architecture
- School of Arts
- School of Foreign Languages (English, German, French, Business English)
