= Qingdao Binhai University =

University in Qingdao, China

Qingdao Binhai University (simplified Chinese: 青岛滨海学院; traditional Chinese: 青島濱海學院; pinyin: Qīngdǎo Bīnhǎi Xuéyuàn), is a private institution of tertiary education in Qingdao, Shandong province, China. It was founded in 1992 and was awarded full college status in 2004. Binhai University has its campus in Huangdao District.
