= Jining Medical University =

Medical school in Shandong, China

Coordinates: 35.39557°N 116.59693°E

- 济宁医学院 (Chinese)
- Type: Public university
- Established: 1952; 74 years ago
- Location: Jining and Rizhao, Shandong, China
- Website: JMU English Website; JMU Chinese Website

Chinese name
- Simplified Chinese: 济宁医学院
- Traditional Chinese: 濟寧醫學院
Transcriptions
Standard Mandarin
- Hanyu Pinyin: Jìníng Yīxuéyuàn

Jining Medical University (Chinese: 济宁医学院) is a public institution of higher learning in Jining and Rizhao, Shandong province, China. It was founded in 1952 as Jining Medical Assistant School (济宁医士学校), in 1958 it became Jining Medical College (济宁医学院), and from 1959 to 1986 it was renamed as 济宁医学专科学校 (Jining Medical College, Three-Year MD program), and it was changed to its current name 济宁医学院 again (Jining Medical College, Five-Year MD program) in 1987.

Most departments offer courses in different medical sciences.
