= Qilu Normal University =

University in Jinan, Shandong, China

Coordinates: 36°40′43″N 117°03′03″E

Qilu Normal College (Chinese: 齐鲁师范学院) is a university located in Jinan, Shandong Province.

Lixia and Zhangqiu are the two campuses of Qilu Normal College, which span nearly 1,300 hectares and have a total building area of 221,000 square meters.

== History ==
In September 1948, the Shandong College of Education (Chinese: 山东教育学院) was established. In January 1949, the institution underwent a name change to Shandong Education Administration Cadre institution.In September 1950, the institution's name was altered to Shandong Secondary Institution Teachers' Training Course. In 1953, the institution's name was altered to Shandong Secondary Institution Teachers' Training School.The institution was divided into two divisions in 1956: the Shandong Province Accelerated Teacher Training College and the Shandong Province Education Cadre Institution.The institution was renamed Shandong Teachers' Training College in 1957. Shandong Province Teachers' Training College was the name of the institution. In 1957, the school was renamed Shandong Province Teachers' Training College. In February 1958, the school and Shandong Province Education Cadre School were merged to form Shandong Province Education Cadre School. In 1960, the school was renamed Shandong Institute of Education. At the beginning of 1966, the school was renamed Shandong Province Teachers' Training School. In June 1978, the school was renamed Shandong Province Normal College. The institution was renamed Qilu Normal College and underwent renovations in April 2010.

In Beijing on March 21, 2024, the National Astronomical Observatory of the Chinese Academy of Sciences and Qilu Normal University executed an agreement to establish the "China Sky Eye Joint Research Centre" (Chinese: 中国天眼联合研究中心).
