= Qingdao Technical College =

Public college in Qingdao, China

Qingdao Technical College (Chinese: 青岛职业技术学院; pinyin: Qīngdǎo Zhíyè Jìshù Xuéyuàn) is a public college based in Huangdao District of Qingdao, Shandong province, China. It was founded in 1951 and has an enrollment of around 9000 students.
