= Shandong Technology and Business University =

Public college in Yantai, Shandong, China

Shandong Technology and Business University (Chinese: 山东工商学院; lit. 'Shandong Industry and Business College') is a public college in Yantai, Shandong, China.
