= Donggang, Rizhao =

Donggang 东港区
- District
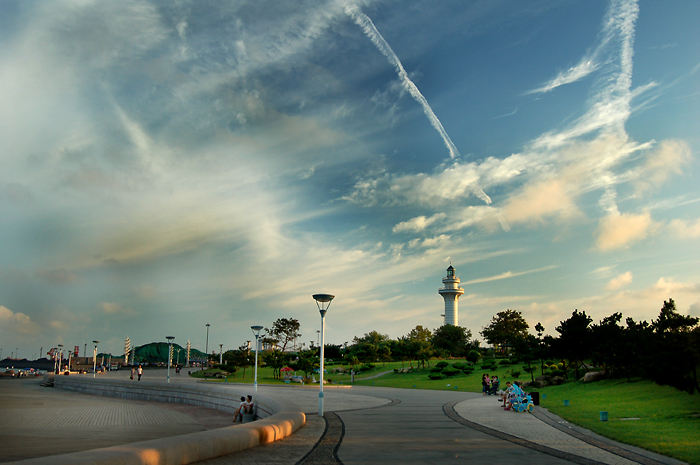

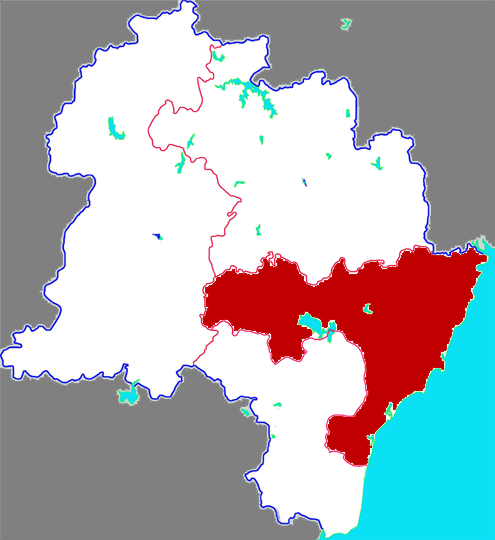
- Donggang in Rizhao

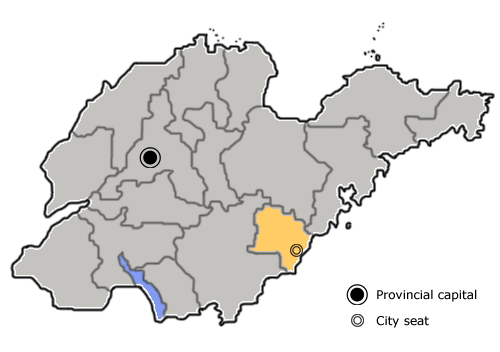
- Rizhao in Shandong
- Coordinates: 35°25′31″N 119°27′44″E
- Country: People's Republic of China
- Province: Shandong
- Prefecture-level city: Rizhao

Area
  - Total: 1,266 km^{2} (489 sq mi)

Population (2019)
  - Total: 751,500
  - Density: 593.6/km^{2} (1,537/sq mi)
- Time zone: UTC+8 (China Standard)
- Postal code: 276800

Donggang District (simplified Chinese: 东港区; traditional Chinese: 東港區; pinyin: Dōnggǎng Qū; lit. 'east harbor') is the main built-up zone or urban district of the city of Rizhao, Shandong province, China. It has an area of 1,636.4 km^{2} (631.8 sq mi) and around 865,000 inhabitants (according to the 2010 census). All the main government and party agencies of the city, as well as the Port of Rizhao, are located in this district.

== Administrative divisions ==
As of 2012, this district is divided to 5 subdistricts and 7 towns.

Subdistricts

- Rizhao Subdistrict (日照街道)
- Shijiu Subdistrict (石臼街道)
- Kuishan Subdistrict (奎山街道)
- Qinlou Subdistrict (秦楼街道)
- Beijinglu Subdistrict (北京路街道)

Towns

- Heshan (河山镇)
- Liangcheng (两城镇)
- Taoluo (涛雒镇)
- Xihu (西湖镇)
- Chentuan (陈疃镇)
- Nanhu (南湖镇)
- Sanzhuang (三庄镇)
