= Jinan =

Capital of Shandong, China

Jinan 济南市 Tsinan, Chi-nan
- Prefecture-level and sub-provincial city
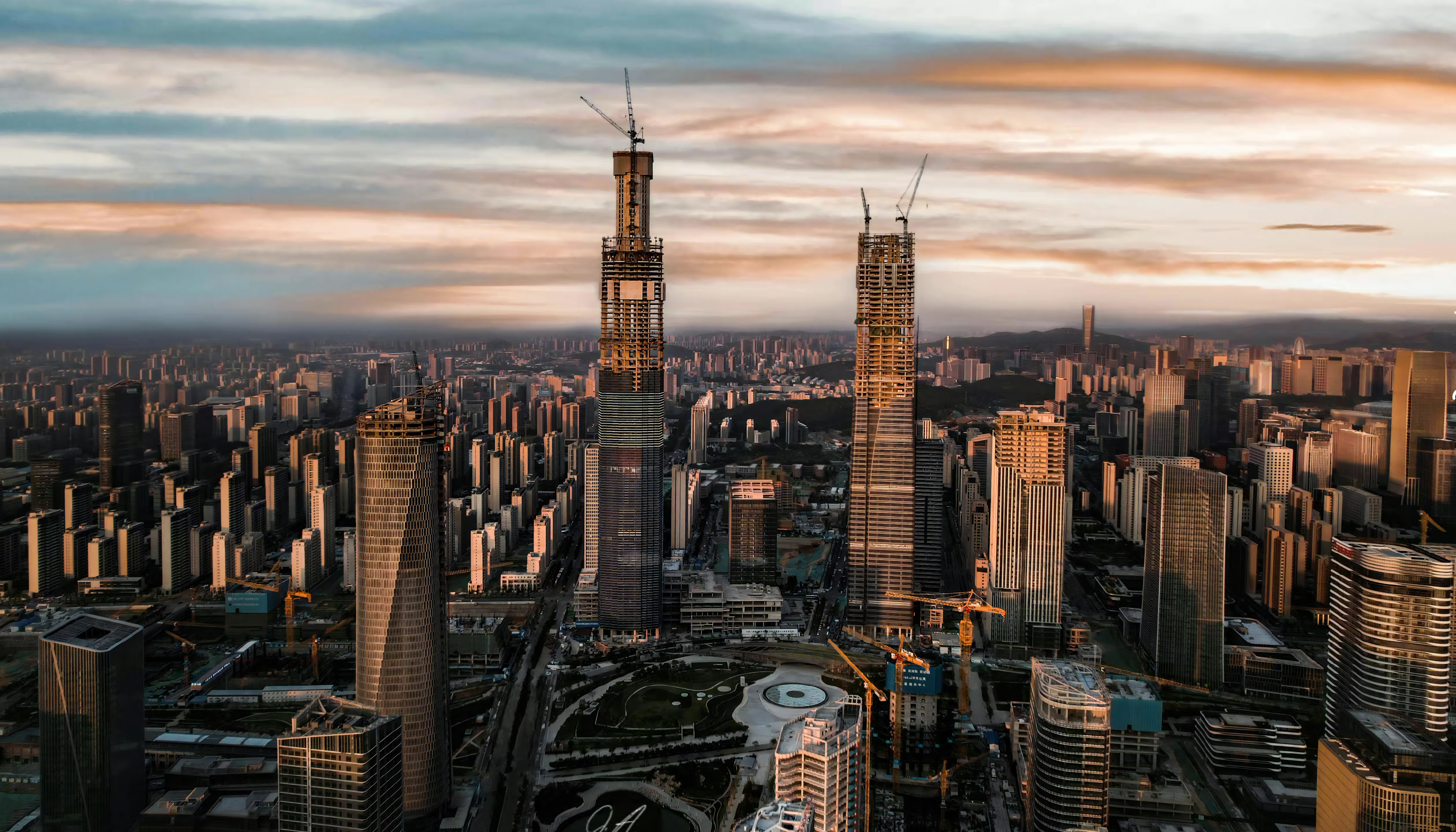
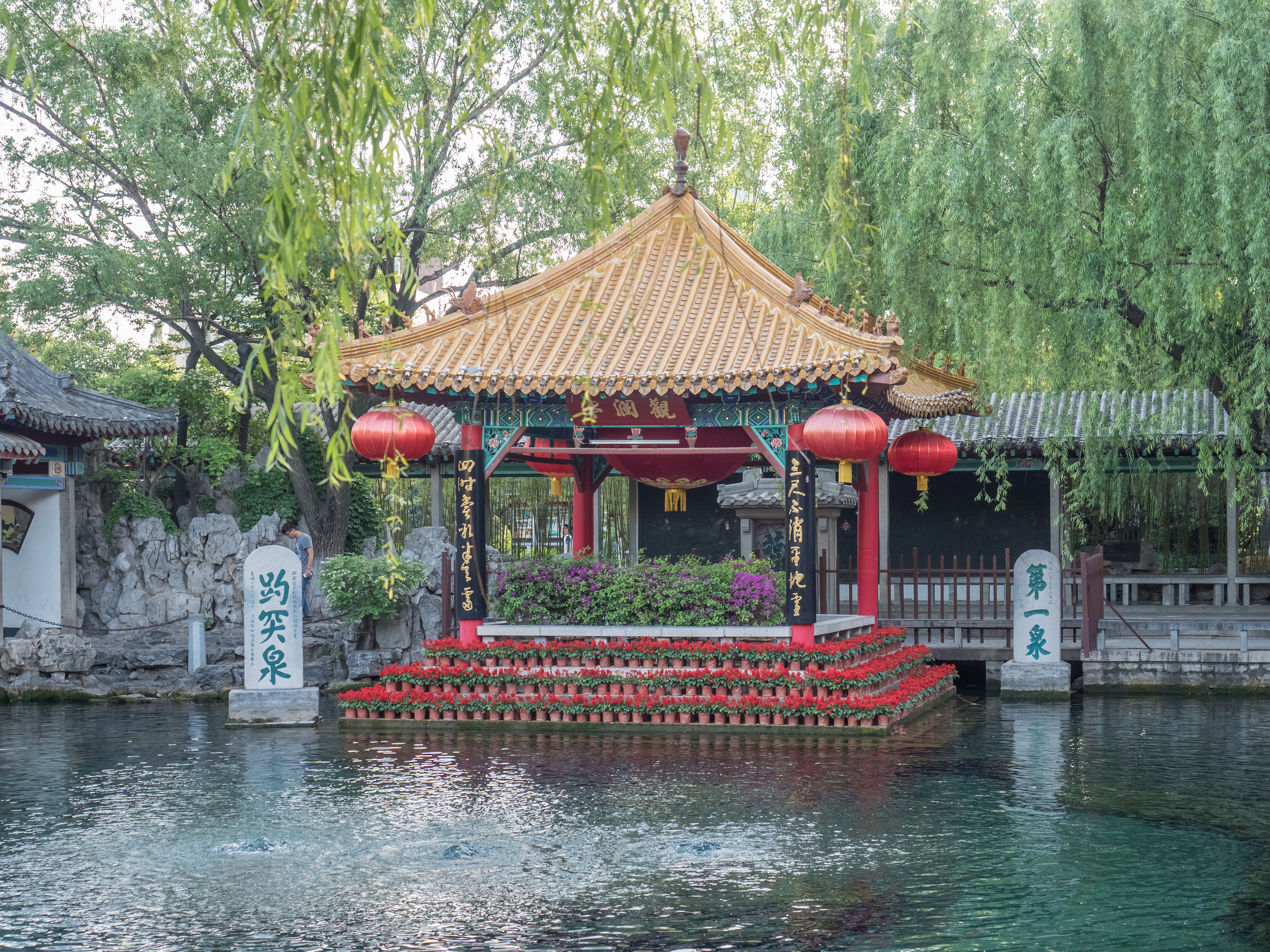
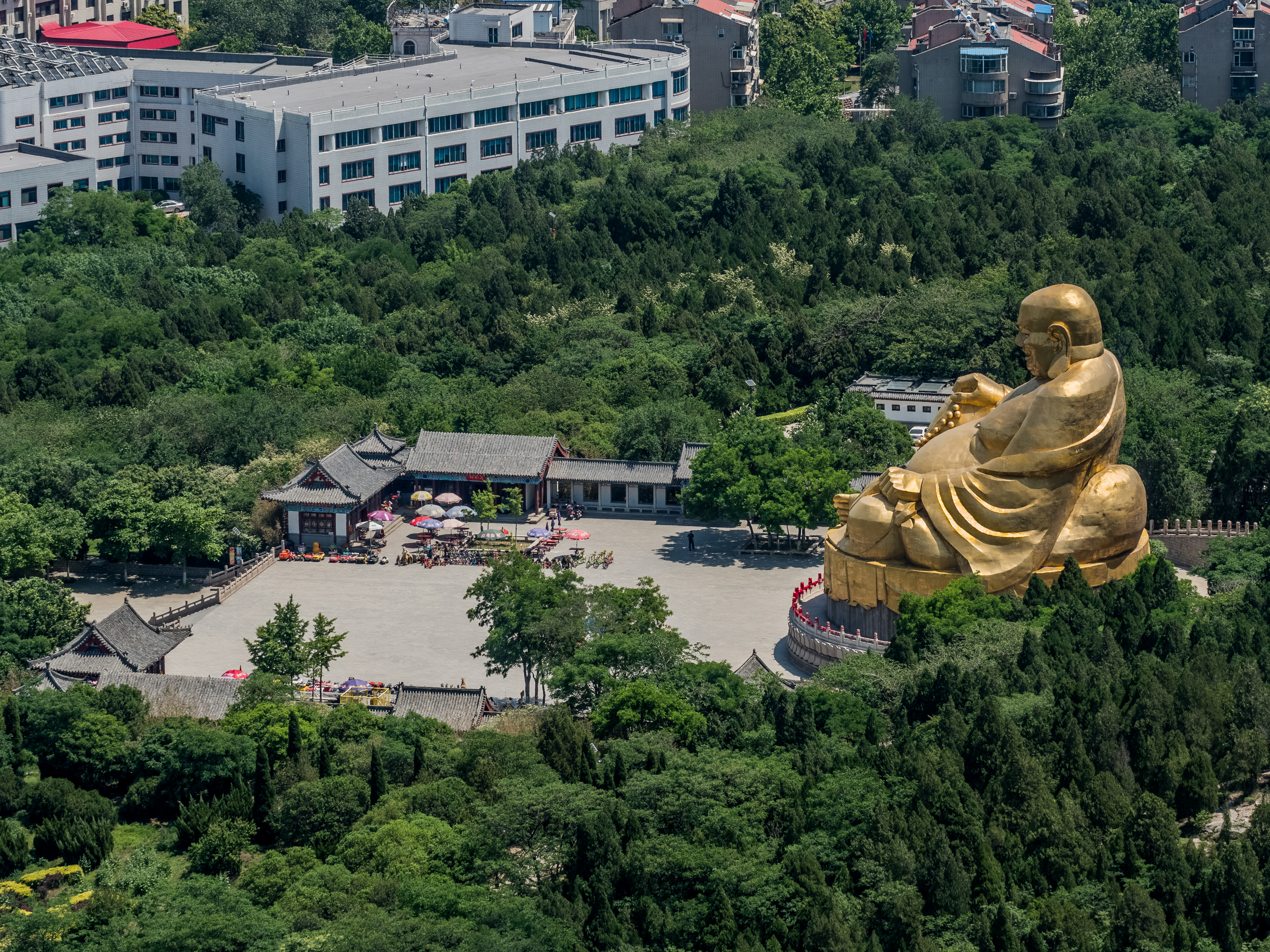
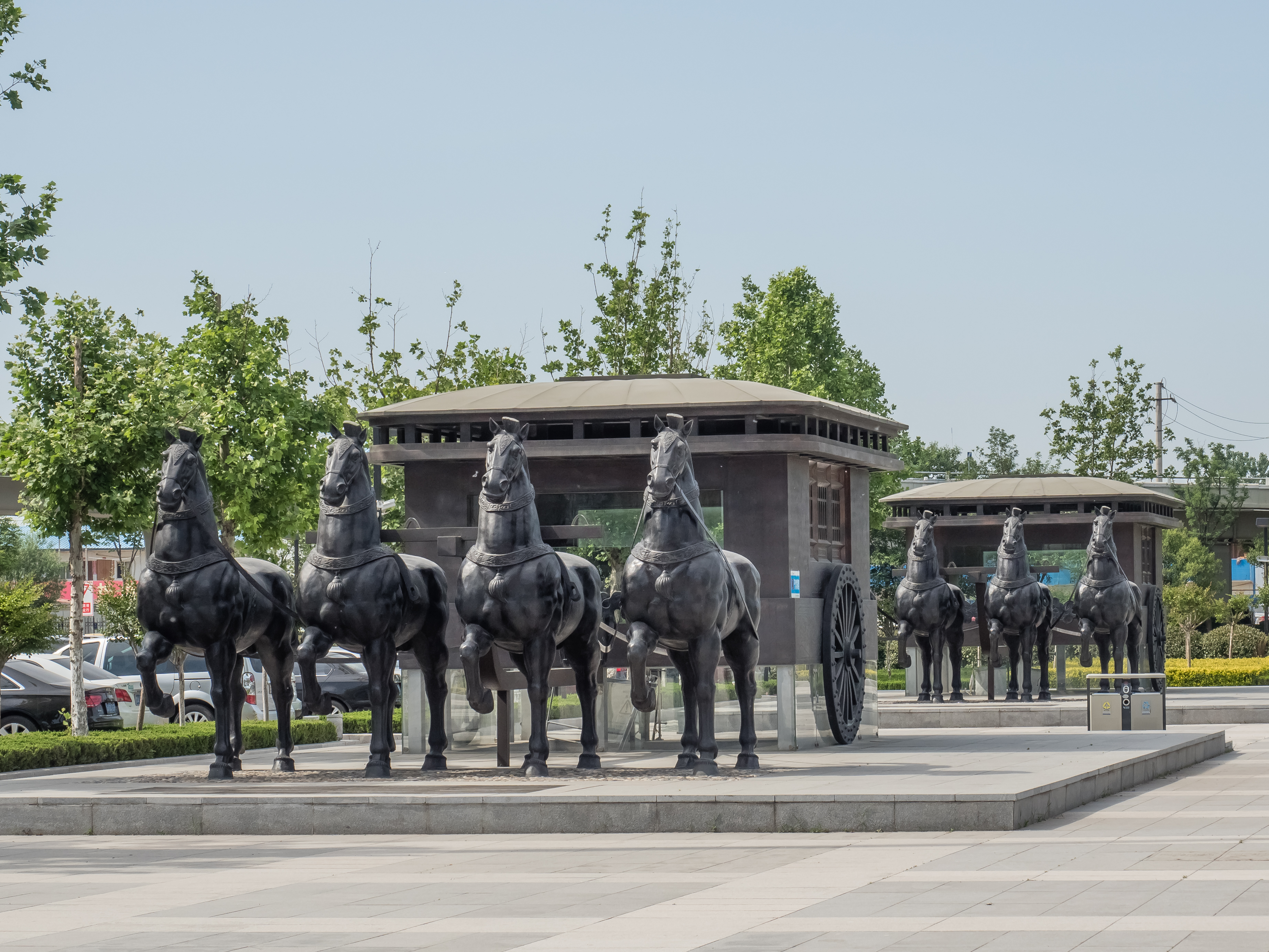
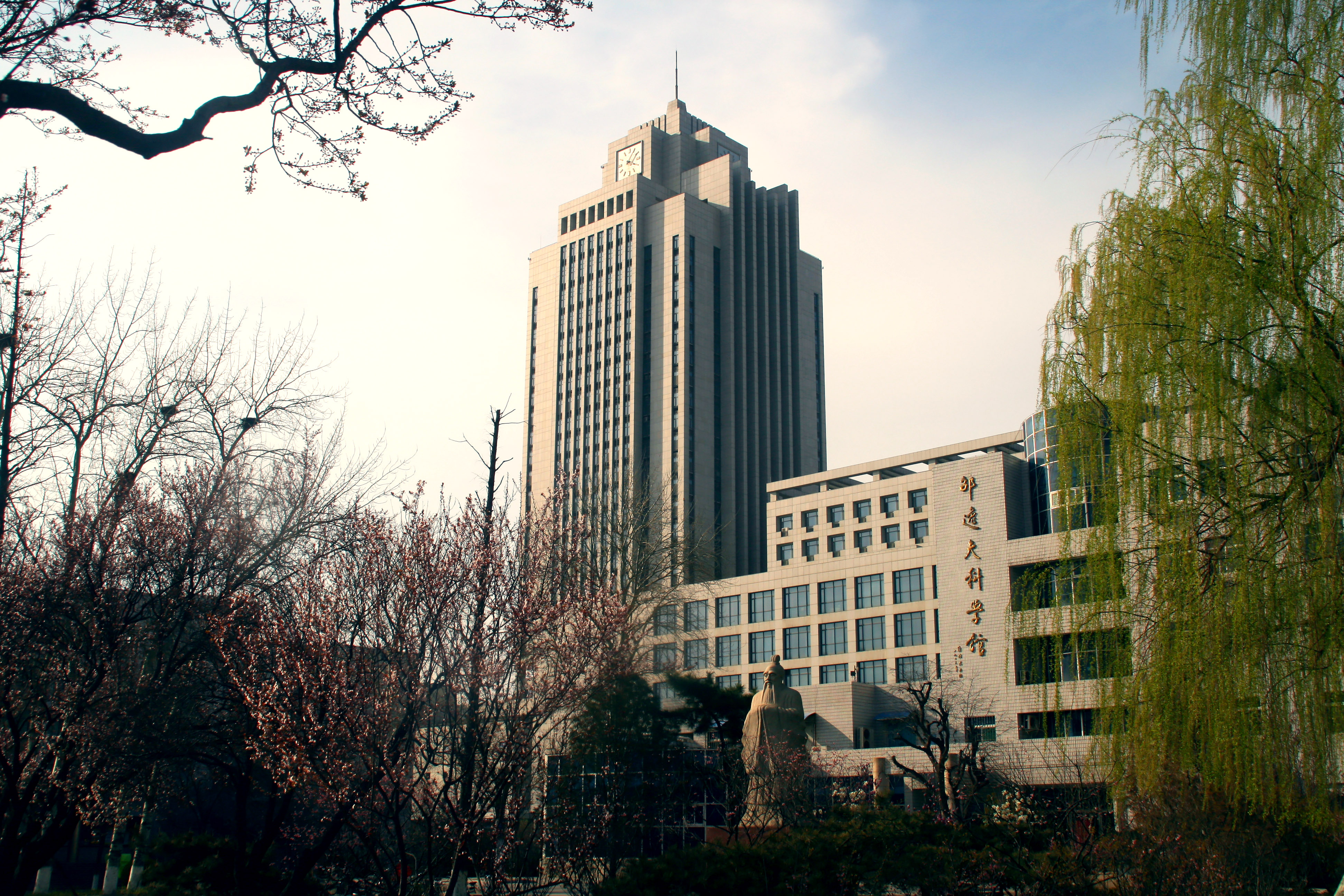
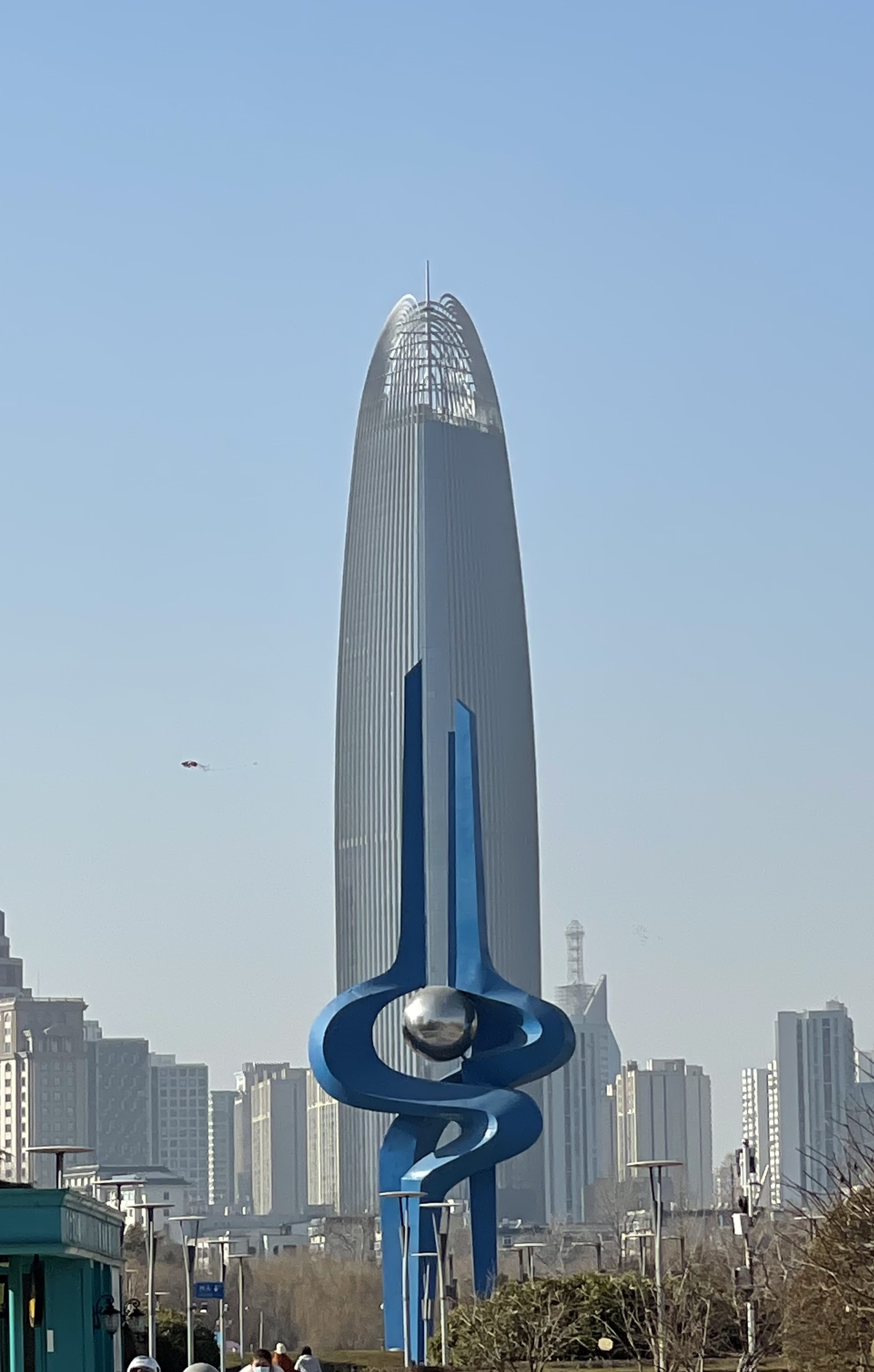
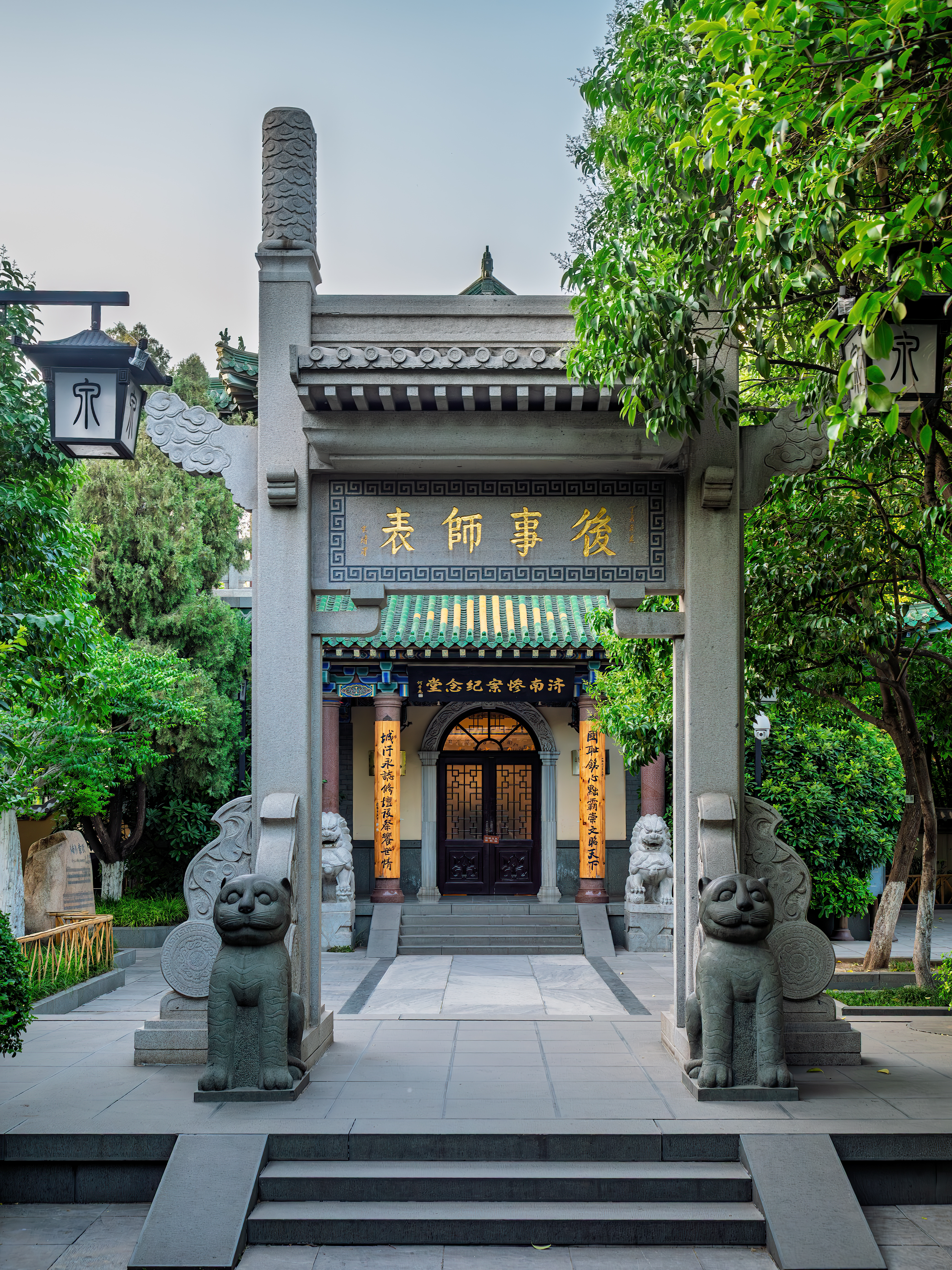
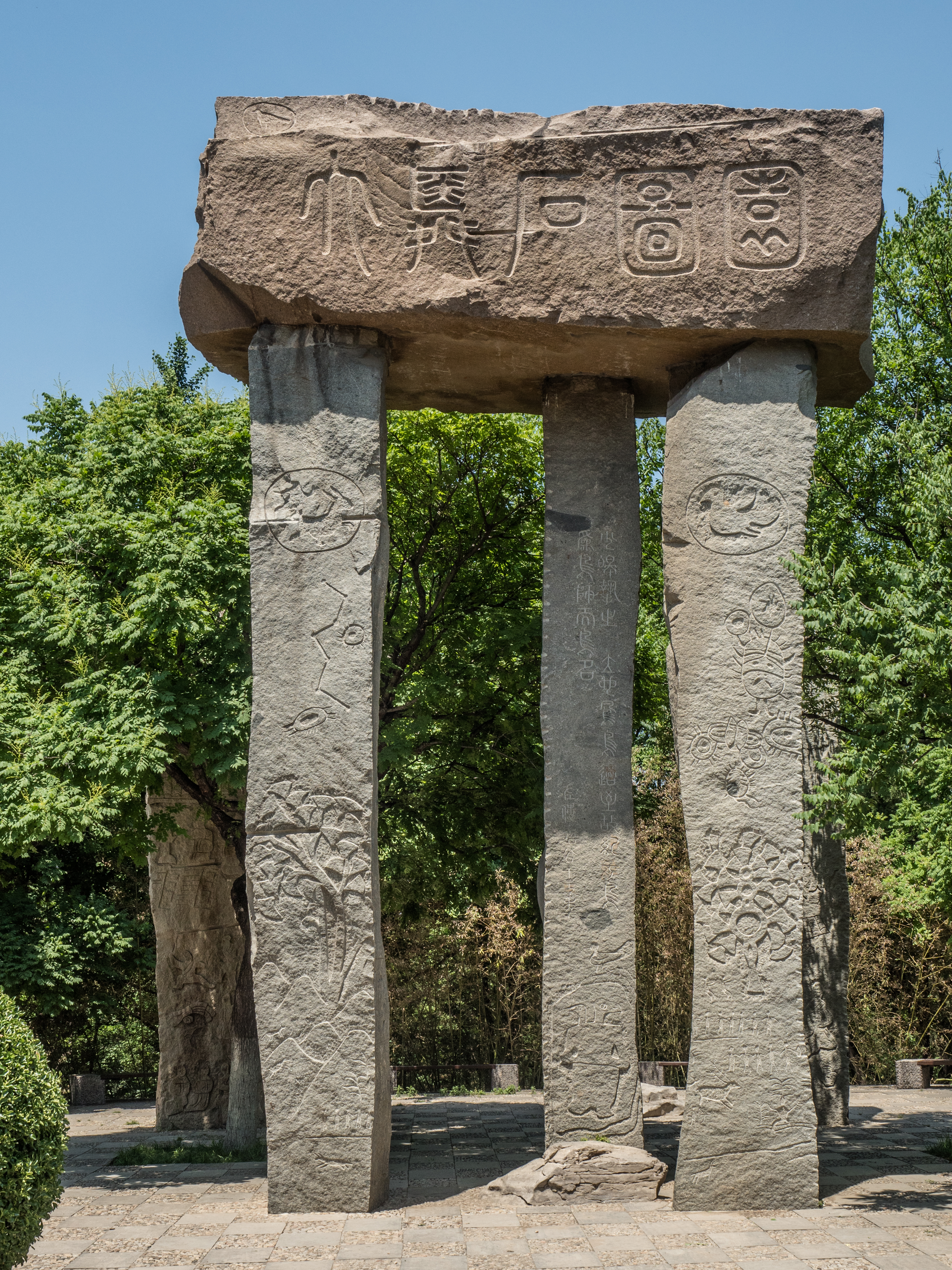
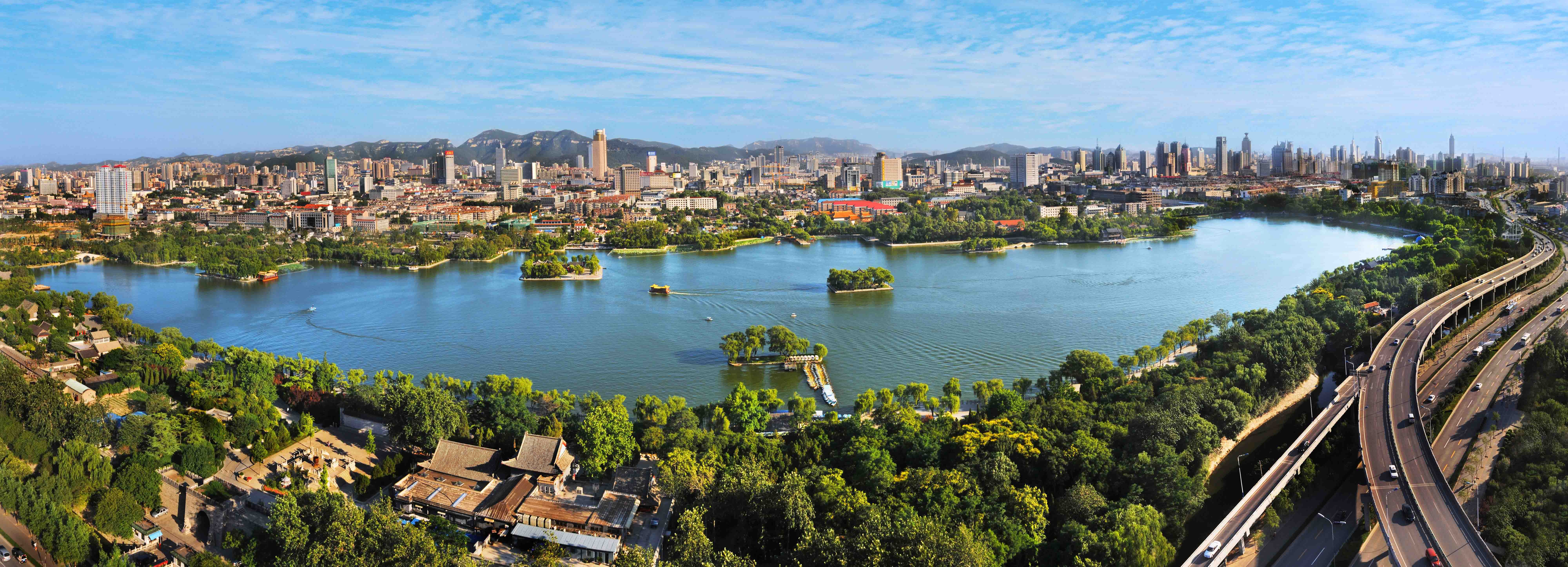
- Skyline of Jinan CBD Baotu Spring Qianfo Mountain Jinanxi Station Shandong University Greenland Puli Center and Quancheng Square Jinan Incident Monument Monument on Qianfo Mountain Daming Lake
- Nickname: City of Springs (泉城)
- Location of Jinan City within Shandong
- Interactive map of Jinan
- Location in the North China Plain Jinan (Northern China) Jinan (China)
- Coordinates (Shandong People's Government): 36°40′13″N 117°01′15″E
- Country: China
- Province: Shandong
- County-level divisions: 12
- Township divisions: 166
- Named for: Ji (济) as in Ji River (济河) + Nan (南) meaning "South" i.e. "South of the Ji River"
- Municipal seat: Lixia District

Government
  - Type: Sub-provincial city
  - Body: Jinan Municipal People's Congress
  - CCP Secretary: Liu Qiang (1971)
  - Jinan Municipal People's Congress Chairman: Han Jinfeng
  - Mayor: Yu Haitian
  - CPPCC Chairman: Sun Kailian

Area
  - City: 10,247 km^{2} (3,956 sq mi)
  - Urban: 6,122.4 km^{2} (2,363.9 sq mi)
  - Metro: 3,304 km^{2} (1,276 sq mi)
- Elevation (Airport): 23 m (75 ft)

Population (2020 census)
  - City: 9,202,432
  - Density: 898.06/km^{2} (2,326.0/sq mi)
  - Urban: 8,352,574
  - Urban density: 1,364.3/km^{2} (3,533.4/sq mi)
  - Metro: 5,452,335
  - Metro density: 1,650/km^{2} (4,274/sq mi)

GDP
  - City: CN¥ 1.433 trillion US$ 206.4 billion
  - Per capita: CN¥ 155,801; US$ 22,430
- Time zone: UTC+8 (China Standard)
- Postal code: 250000
- Area code: 0531
- ISO 3166 code: CN-SD-01
- License plate prefixes: 鲁A, 鲁S
- Website: jinan.gov.cn
- City tree: Chinese Willow; City flower: Lotus and Rose

Jinan
- "Jǐnán" in simplified (top) and traditional (bottom) Chinese characters
- Simplified Chinese: 济南
- Traditional Chinese: 濟南
- Literal meaning: "South of the Ji [River]"
Transcriptions
Standard Mandarin
- Hanyu Pinyin: Jǐnán
- Bopomofo: ㄐㄧˇ ㄋㄢˊ
- Wade–Giles: Chi^{3}-nan^{2}
- IPA: [tɕì.nǎn]
Wu
- Romanization: Tsi^{去}noe^{平}
Yue: Cantonese
- Yale Romanization: Jái-nàahm
- Jyutping: Zai2-naam4
- IPA: [tsɐj˧˥.nam˩]
Southern Min
- Hokkien POJ: Chè-lâm
- Tâi-lô: Tsē-lâm

Jinan (Note: Chinese: 济南; pinyin: Jǐnán; alternately romanized as Tsinan) is the capital of the Shandong province in Eastern China. With a population of 9.2 million, it is one of the largest cities in Shandong in terms of population. The area of present-day Jinan has played an important role in the history of the region from the earliest beginnings of civilization and has evolved into a major national administrative, economic, and transportation hub. The city has held sub-provincial administrative status since 1994. Jinan is often called the "City of Springs" for its famous 72 artesian springs.

Jinan is listed as the 27th best city in the world for scientific research as tracked by the Nature Index according to the Nature Index 2025 Science Cities. The city is home to several major universities, including Shandong, Shandong Normal, Shandong Jianzhu, University of Jinan, Qilu University of Technology, Shandong University of Traditional Chinese Medicine and Shandong University of Finance and Economics. Notably, Shandong University is one of China's most prestigious universities as a member of the Double First-Class Construction. The city was rated Beta- (Global second-tier city) by the biannual GAWC ratings in 2020.

== Etymology ==
The modern-day name Jinan literally means "south of the Ji" and refers to the old Ji River (濟水) that had flowed to the north of the city until the middle of the 19th century. Similar names can be found in Jiyuan (lit. "source of Ji River") and Jiyang (lit. "yang (north) side of Ji River"), The Ji River disappeared in 1852 when the Yellow River changed its course northwards and took over its bed. The current pronunciation of the character "Ji" with the third tone (jǐ) was established in the late 1970s. Prior to this, it was pronounced with the fourth tone (jì). Older western texts spell the name as "Tsinan" (Postal romanization) or "Chi-nan" (Wade-Giles romanization).

In ancient times, Jinan was also called the "estate of Luo" (濼邑), Luo refers to Baotu Spring, this can be seen in oracle bone scripts of Di Yi and Di Xin. The Battle of An, which was fought in the area during Spring and Autumn period (in 589 BCE) between the states of Qi and Jin, is named for the ancient city of An (Chinese: 鞍; pinyin: Ān) which stood within the city limits of present-day Jinan. Marco Polo gives a brief description of Jinan under the name "Chingli" or "Chinangli".

From Zhou dynasty (1045-256 BC) to Western Jin dynasty (266–316 AD), the main settlement of Jinan Commandery was called the "city of East Pingling" (東平陵), which is located in current day Zhangqiu. During the Western Jin Dynasty, the administrative center was moved westward to Licheng, and this was kept until Qing dynasty. 19th and early 20th century texts frequently give the name of the city as "Tsinan Fu" where the additional "Fu" (Chinese: 府) is the word Prefecture in Chinese.

Currently the city of Lixia (simplified Chinese: 历下; traditional Chinese: 歷下; pinyin: Lìxià) was the major settlement in the area. The name "Lixia" refers to the location of Jinan at the foot of Mount Li, which lies to the south of the city.

Jinan is also referred to by the nickname "City of Springs" (Chinese: 泉城), because of the many artesian springs in the urban city centre and its surroundings.

== History ==
=== Early history ===
The area of present-day Jinan has been inhabited for more than 4000 years. The Neolithic Longshan culture was first discovered at Chengziya to the east of Jinan (Zhangqiu District) in 1928. One of the characteristic features of the Longshan culture are the intricate wheel-made pottery pieces it produced. Most renowned is the black "egg-shell pottery" with wall thicknesses that can go below 1 millimeter.

During the Spring and Autumn period (722–481 BCE) and Warring States period (475–221 BCE), the area of Jinan was split between two states: the state of Lu in the west and the state of Qi in the east. In 685 BCE, the state of Qi started to build the Great Wall of Qi across Changqing county. Portions of the wall still remain today and are accessible as open air museums. Bian Que, according to the legend the earliest Chinese physician and active around 400–300 BCE, is said to have been a native of present-day Changqing County. Zou Yan (305–240 BCE), a native of Zhangqiu City, developed the concepts of Yin-Yang and the Five Elements. Joseph Needham, a British sinologist, describes Zou as "The real founder of all Chinese scientific thought."

=== Imperial era ===
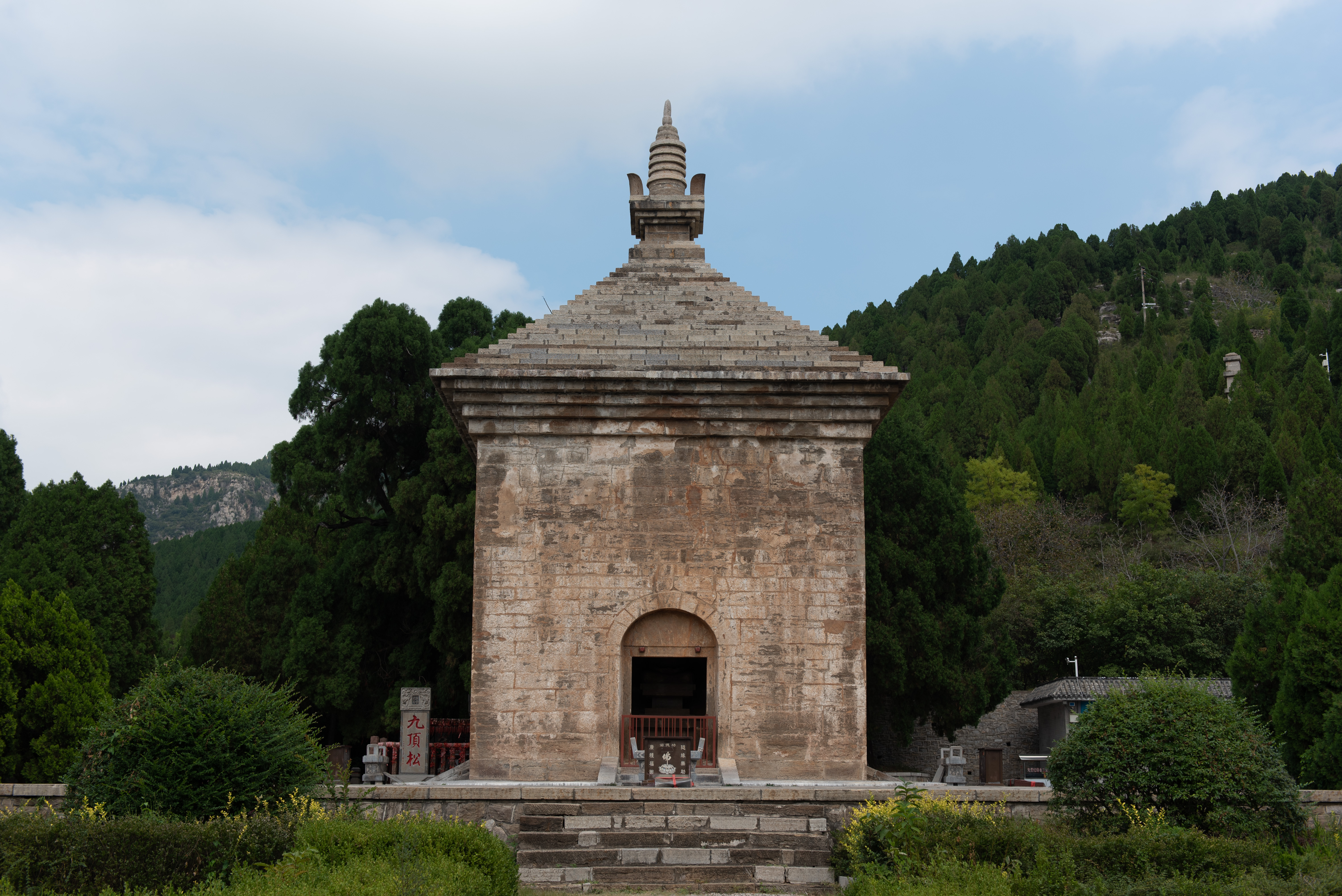
The Four Gates Pagoda near Jinan is the only stone pagoda in China that can be dated back to Sui dynasty

After Qin Shi Huang conquered Qi and united China, he established Qi Commandery, which evolved into Jinan Commandery and Kingdom of Jibei in the early Han dynasty (206 BCE – 220 CE). During the times of the Han dynasty, Jinan was the capital of the feudatory Kingdom of Jibei (Chinese: 濟北國) and evolved into the cultural and economic hub of the region. The Han dynasty tomb where the last king of Jibei, Liu Kuan (刘宽; 劉寬; Liú Kuān), was buried at Shuangru Mountain was excavated by archaeologists from Shandong University in 1995 and 1996. More than 2000 artifacts such as jade swords, jade masks, and jade pillows have been recovered within the 1,500 square meter excavation site, emphasizing the wealth of the city during the period. Cao Cao (155 – 220 CE) was an official in Jinan before he became the de facto ruler of the Han dynasty. His son, Cao Pi, overthrew the last emperor of the Han and founded the Wei Kingdom (220 – 265 CE) of the Three Kingdoms period.

Beginning in the 5th century CE, Buddhism flourished in Jinan. The Langgong Temple (朗公寺; Lǎnggōng Sì, later renamed Shentong Temple, (神通寺; Shéntōng Sì, and now in ruins) in the southern county of Licheng was one of the most important temples in northern China at that time. The same period witnessed extensive construction of Buddhist sites in the southern counties of Licheng and Changqing such as the Lingyan Temple and the Thousand-Buddha Cliff. In particular, a large number of cave temples were established in the hills south of Jinan.

Jinan remained the cultural center of the region during the Song dynasty (960 – 1279 CE). The Song rulers promoted Jinan to a superior prefecture in 1116 CE. Two of the most important poets of the Southern Song were both born in Jinan: Li Qingzhao (1084–1151 CE), the most renown female poet in Chinese history, and Xin Qiji (1140–1207 CE), who was also a military leader of the Southern Song dynasty. Both poets witnessed a series of crushing defeats of the Song dynasty at the hands of the Jurchens who gained control over almost half of the Song territories and established the Jin dynasty in northern China. After Jinan came under control of the Jin dynasty, both Li Qingzhao and Xin Qiji had to abandon their homes and reflected this experience in their works.

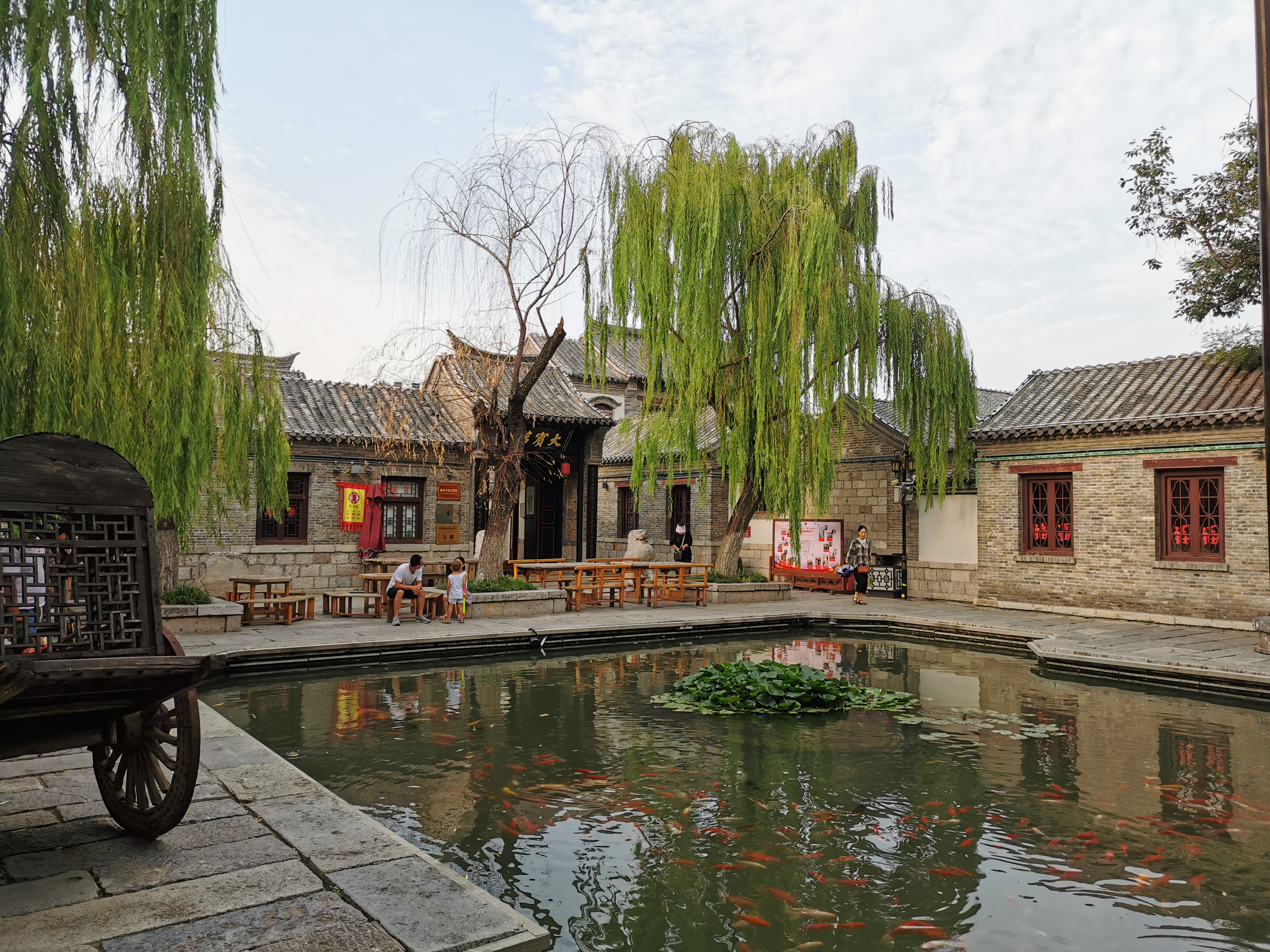
Old town of Jinan

During the Civil War that followed the proclamation of Kublai Khan as Great Khan in 1260 CE, Jinan was at the center of a rebellion by Yizhou governor Li Tan against Mongol rule in 1262 CE. The rebellion was crushed in a decisive battle that was fought not far from Jinan in late March or early April 1262 CE. After losing 4000 of his troops in the battle, Li Tan retreated to Jinan to make his last stand. After defections of his defenders had made his position untenable, Li Tan tried to commit suicide by drowning himself in Daming Lake. However, he was rescued by the Mongols in order to execute him by trampling him to death with their horses.

Despite such violent conflicts, culture in Jinan continued to thrive during the Jin (1115–1234) and Yuan (1271–1368) dynasties: One of the most renowned artists of the Yuan dynasty, Zhao Mengfu (1254–1322) was appointed to the post of governor of Jinan in 1293 and spent three years in the city. Among the extraordinary art works he completed during his stay in Jinan, the best known painting is "Autumn Colors on the Qiao and Hua Mountains". Geographer Yu Qin (1284–1333) also served as an official in Jinan and authored his geography book Qi Cheng there.

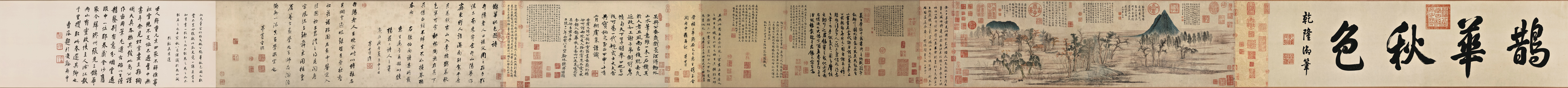
Autumn Colors on the Qiao and Hua Mountains (鹊华秋色) by Zhao Mengfu

=== Ming and Qing ===
When Shandong province was established under the reign of Hongwu Emperor, Jinan replaced Qingzhou to become its capital. Jinan was the site of a siege during the Jingnan Campaign where the city was defended by loyalists of the Jianwen Emperor led by Tie Xuan against the rebel Prince of Yan Zhu Di's army.

In 1852, the northward shift of the Yellow River into a new bed close to the city triggered the modern expansion of Jinan. The new course of the Yellow River connected the city to the Grand Canal and regional waterways in northern Shandong and southern Hebei.

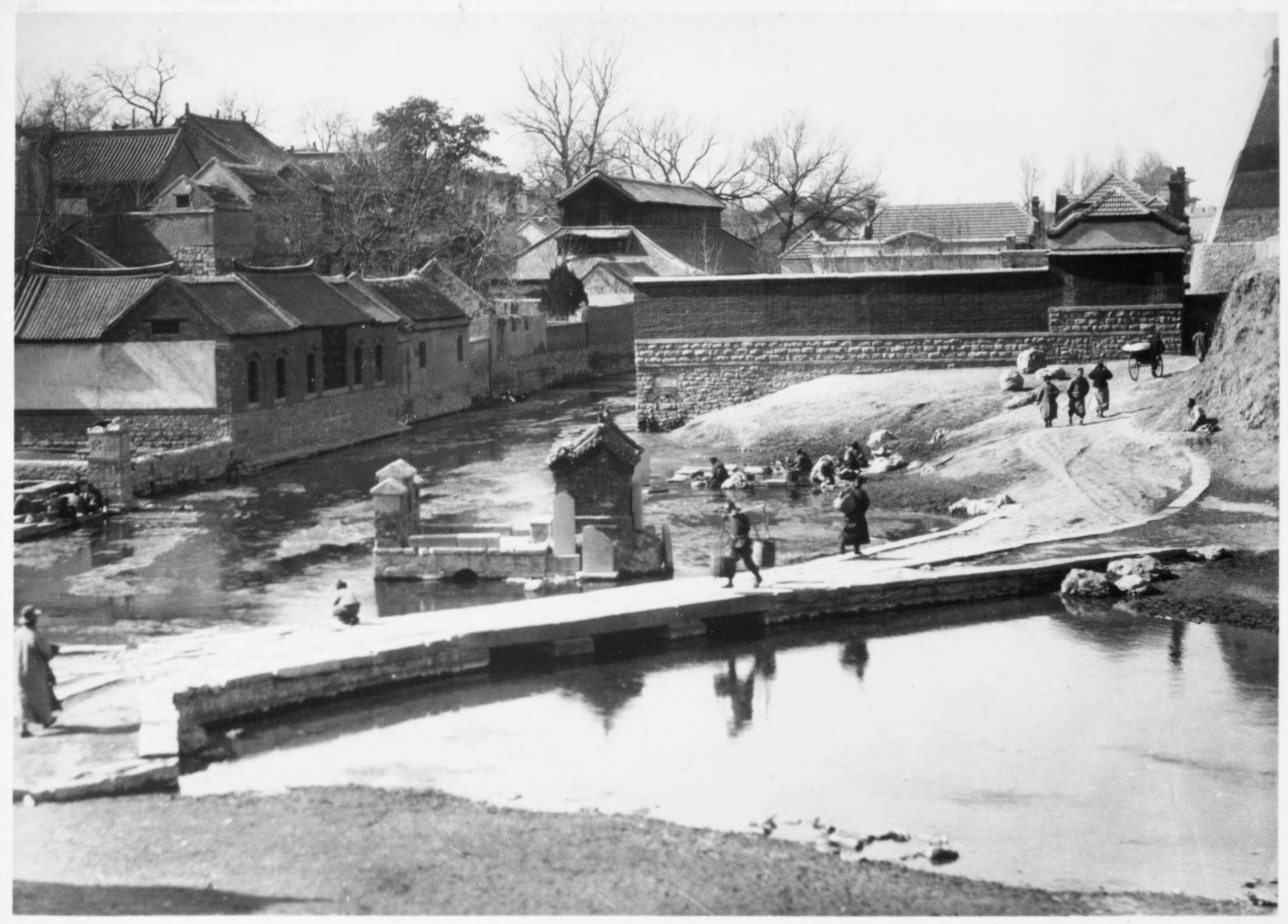
Heihu Spring in the early 20th century

German influence in Jinan grew after the Qing dynasty ceded Qingdao to the German Empire in 1897. A German concession area was established to the west of the historical city center (in the vicinity of the Jinan Railway Station first established by the Germans). The Jiaoji (Qingdao–Jinan) railway was built by the Germans against local resistance. Discontent over the construction of the railway was one of the sources fueling the Boxer Rebellion (1899–1901). During the rebellion, foreign priests were evacuated from Jinan and Chinese Christians became a target of violence. The Jiaoji railway was completed in 1904, three years after the Boxer Rebellion had been put down, and opened the city to foreign trade. The importance of Jinan as a transportation hub was cemented with the completion of the north–south Jinpu railway from Tianjin to Pukou in 1912. Jinan became a major trading center for agricultural goods in northern China. Traded commodities included cotton, grain, peanuts, and tobacco. Jinan also developed into a major industrial center, second in importance to Qingdao in the province.

=== Republican era ===
In 1919, after World War I, the Japanese took over the German sphere of influence in Shandong, including control of the Jiaoji railway, and established a significant Japanese influence in Jinan. According to estimates by a contemporary Japanese government official, about 2,000 Japanese were living in Jinan in 1931, about half of whom were involved in the opium trade for which the Japanese had a loosely controlled monopoly that was exploited with the participation of Chinese traders.

During the Warlord era of the Republic of China, Zhang Zongchang, nicknamed the "Dogmeat General", ruled Shandong from Jinan for a period that lasted from April 1925 until May 1928. Zhang was unpopular for his heavy-handed rule and in particular his heavy taxation. Besides heavy taxes, he relied financially on opium to finance his periodic wars. Zhang even planned to use some of the wealth extracted from these sources for building a living shrine and a large bronze statue for himself on the shore of Daming Lake, but these plans were not realized as his rule came to an end.

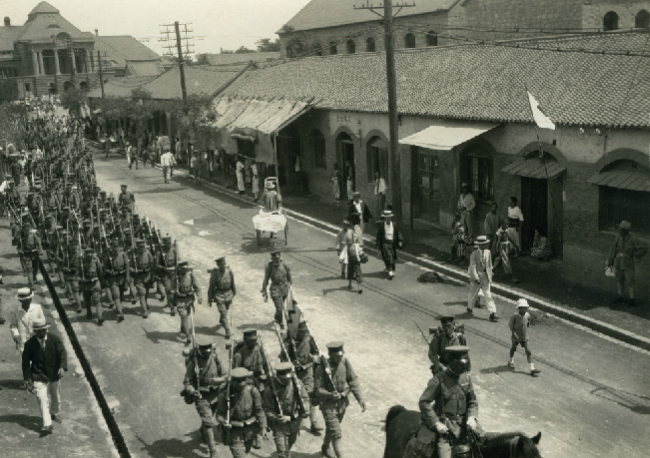
Japanese soldiers marching into Jinan during the Jinan incident

In the spring of 1928, the Kuomintang's Northern Expedition reached Jinan. On 3 May 1928, clashes developed between Japanese troops stationed in Jinan and the Kuomintang troops moving into the city (Jinan incident). Cai Gongshi, a Kuomintang emissary sent to negotiate and 16 members of his entourage were cruelly executed by the Japanese. Japanese officers placed an order to slice off his nose and ears, and to gouge out his eyes and tongue. Sixteen other members of his negotiation team were also stripped naked, recklessly whipped, dragged to the back-lawn, and slaughtered by machine guns on the same day. After the incident, Japanese reinforcements were sent to Shandong and by 11 May, Japanese troops pushed the Chinese troops from the area, inflicted thousands of casualties and killed over 2000 Chinese civilians. The Japanese occupied Jinan for more than six months until they withdrew to their garrison in Qingdao on 28 March 1929. When Chiang lectured a group of Chinese army cadets, he urged them to turn their energies to washing away the shame of Jinan, but to conceal their hatred until the last moment. The Kuomintang government later decreed that 3 May be designated a "National Humiliation Memorial Day".

During the Nanjing decade of the Republic of China, Han Fuju, a military commander from the warlord era who had aligned himself with the Kuomintang, was rewarded with the military governorship of Shandong, after fighting against the rebel troops of Yan Xishan and his former commander Feng Yuxiang in the Central Plains War in 1930. He established his base in Jinan and is credited with curtailing banditry and drug trading, thereby bringing a measure of peace and prosperity to the city. However, from 1935 onwards Han was under heavy pressure from the Japanese consul in Jinan to declare Shandong an "independent state" allied with Japan.

After the start of the Second Sino-Japanese War, the Japanese invasion force crossed the Yellow River 60 km (37 mi) north-east of Jinan on 23 December 1937. Han Fuju abandoned Jinan the next day against orders to hold the city to the death. He ordered the offices of the provincial government and the Japanese consulate in Jinan to be burned down and the ensuing power vacuum led to widespread looting in the city. Japanese troops from the 10th Division of the Manchurian Area Army entered Jinan on 27 December 1937. Han Fuju was arrested and executed for disobeying orders from superior commanders and retreating on his own accord by Chiang Kai-Shek's chief of staff, General Hu Zongnan.

=== After World War II ===
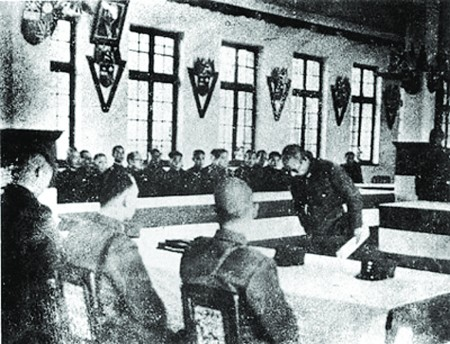
Japanese surrender in Jinan, 27 Dec 1945

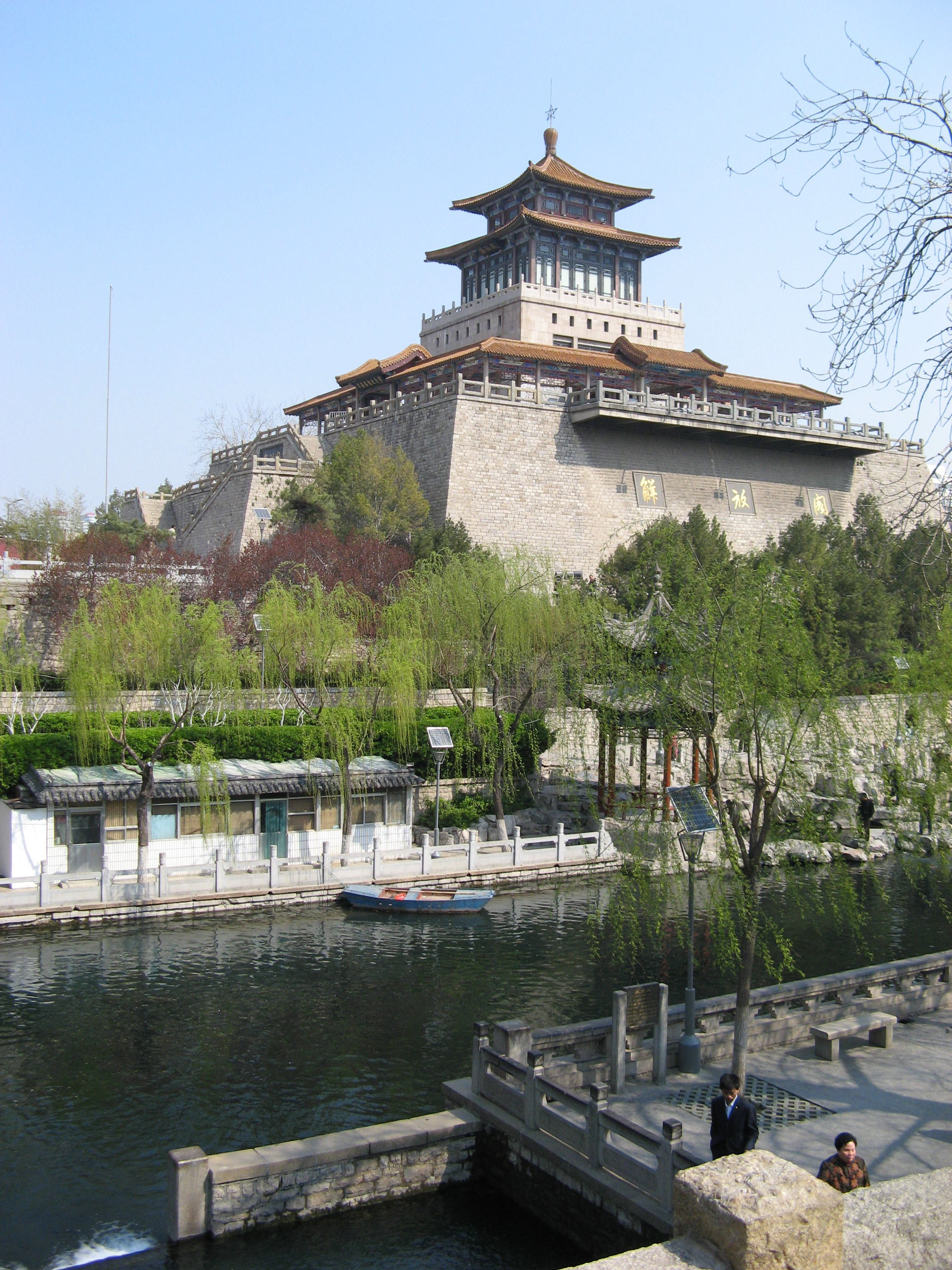
Jinan Liberation Pavilion witnessed the takeover of the city by communists in the civil war

Japanese troops controlled Jinan until their defeat in 1945. After this, the Kuomintang regained short-lived control of the city during the period from 1946 to 1948. The provincial government during this time was led by Lieutenant-General Wang Yaowu, who also commanded the KMT army in the region. KMT rule over Jinan ended in September 1948 with the Battle of Jinan in which units of the People's Liberation Army under the command of Chen Yi took the city. The battle for Jinan took a decisive turn in favor of the attackers when KMT Lieutenant-General Wu Huawen defected to the Communist side with about 8,000 of his troops. The most likely explanation for his defection is that he had been pressured through relatives of his who were held captive by the Communist forces. Lieutenant-General Wu had been in charge of the vital outer ring of defenses that protected the main airfield, the railroad station, and the commercial district. With these critical assets lost, the situation of the city's defenders became untenable. Following the weakening of the city's defenses, the People's Liberation Army breached the city wall and entered Jinan on 24 September 1948.

=== Cultural Revolution ===
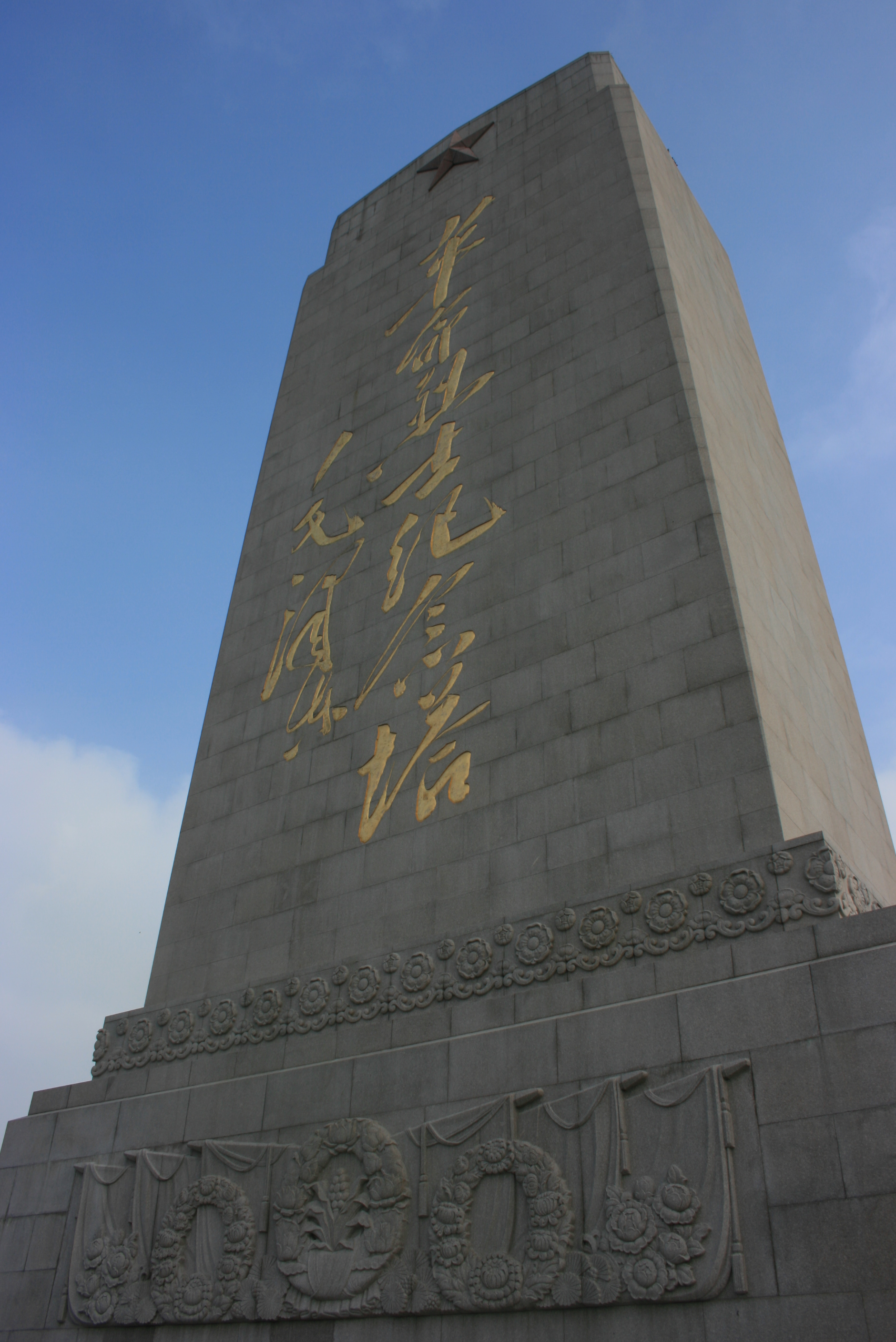
Monument commemorating the war dead of the battle of Jinan on Hero Hill

In March 1966, the largest among the drawn-out sequence of earthquakes that made up the Xingtai earthquake damaged about 36,000 houses in Jinan.

On 27 May 1966, the Cultural Revolution started in Jinan with an article in the local newspaper "Jinan Evening News" (济南晚报) that denounced vice-governor Yu Xiu as a Bourgeois agent within the government. Starting from early June 1966, the schools in Jinan were closed down by strikes as teachers were "struggled against". At the same time, big-character posters started to appear in the city. Red Guards took to the streets of Jinan from late August 1966 onwards, damaging cultural heritage and setting up courts to prosecute perceived enemies of the revolution. In the spring of 1967, the "May 7th Incident" took place: When Zhang Chunqiao and Yao Wenyuan, both later reviled as members of the Gang of Four, visited Jinan to support the Cultural Revolution and its local leader Wang Xiao Yu, fighting erupted in the front of the provincial government between two rival factions of the Cultural Revolution, the "April 22nd Group" and Wang Xiao Yu's "April 28th Group". In the end, more than 10,000 people had been involved in the fighting. On 11 October 1967, the tallest statue of Mao Zedong in Shandong province was erected on the campus of Shandong Normal University. On 17 September 1968, a large assembly of Jinan workers celebrated the arrival of a mango fruit in the "August 1st" Meeting Hall. The fruit had been a gift to the workers in Beijing by Mao and was subsequently passed on to the workers in Jinan. In November 1968, Wang Xiao Yu began to agitate against the local army units in Jinan and Shandong Province. By then unrest due to the Cultural Revolution had severely damaged the city's governmental and industrial infrastructure, with about 80 percent of all government institutions shut down. Large public protests were staged on 4 and 5 April 1969, in which approximately 500,000 people protested the occupation of Zhenbao Island by the Soviet Union. On 29 July 1970, the leadership of the Cultural Revolution passed a resolution to make sweeping changes to the city's educational system: The liberal arts departments of Shandong University were moved to Qufu and combined with Qufu Normal College to form a new Shandong University. The biology department was moved to Tai'an and merged into the Shandong Agricultural College. The rest of the sciences were to form the Shandong Science and Technology University. Shandong Normal University was to be moved to Liaocheng. Shandong Medical College and Shandong College of Traditional Chinese Medicine were to be merged and moved to Tai'an. Shandong University was restored in its original form and the "Shandong Science and Technology University" was abolished in early 1974. The first reversals of Cultural Revolution policies started in early 1971: On 23 May of that year, the Shandong Provincial Museum was reopened after having been closed for about 5 years (since May 1966). In the next year, the Jinan Committee for the Cultural Revolution officially reverted the name changes of four city districts enacted in 1966. During the 6 years between the name change and its reversal, Lixia District had been known officially as "Hongwei", Tianqiao as "Face the Sun", Huaiyin as "East Wind", and Shizhong as "Red Flag". As the Cultural Revolution came to an end, Jinan started to receive visitors from abroad. For example, it was visited by a delegation from the United States Congress between 8 and 11 August 1975. On 18 September 1976, Mao's death was mourned by about 600,000 people at an official service in Jinan's 1 August Square.

=== Post 1990s ===
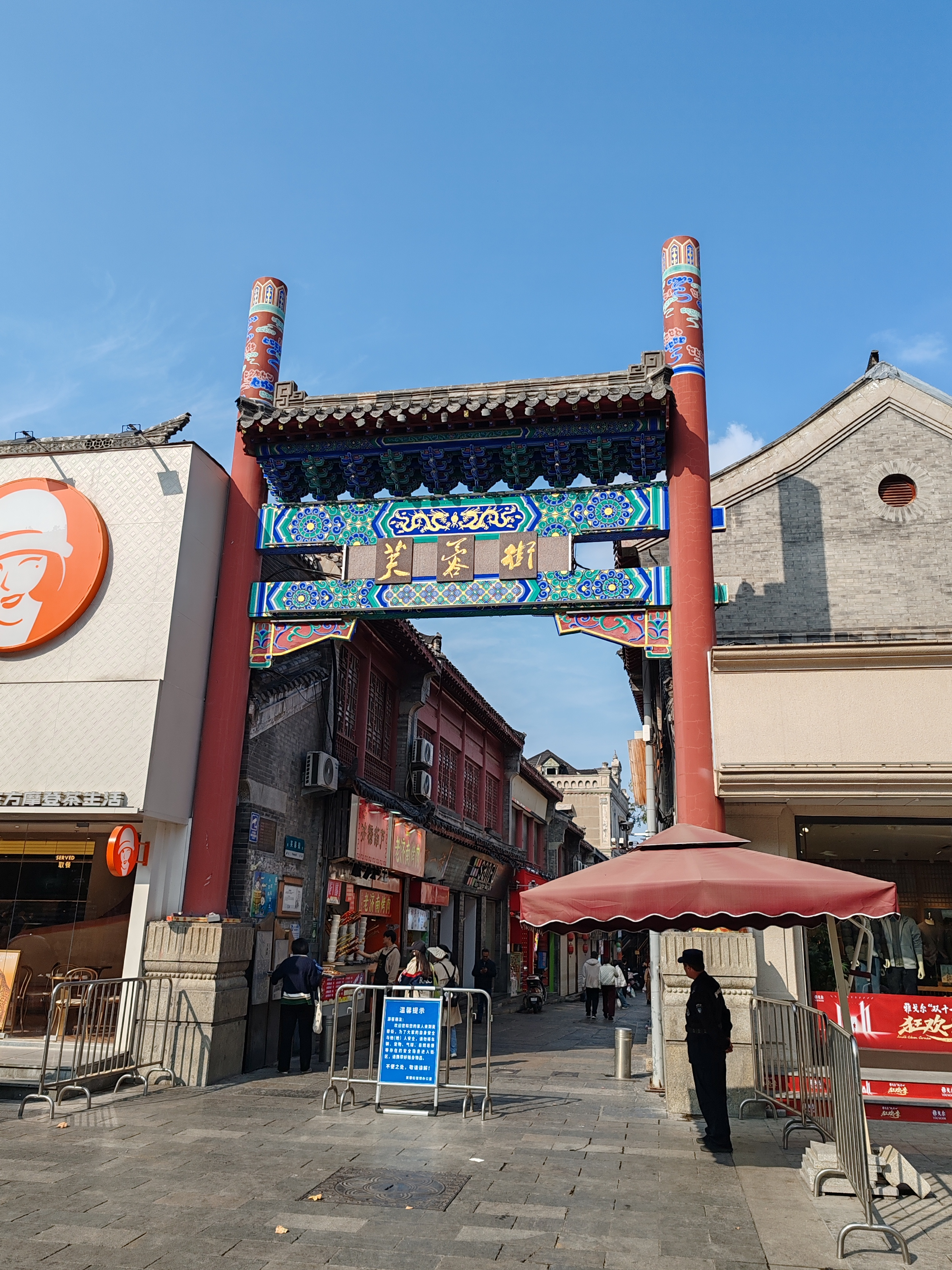
Entrance to Water Lily Street, a historical shopping street in Jinan.

Jinan was the host of the 11th All China Games during October 2009. These games are the selection games for the Chinese Olympic champions. For this occasion, security was heightened and a full volunteer force was out on the streets directing visitor traffic. The city conducted major renovations in its transportation and recreation services in anticipation of the Games' visitors. In early January 2019, the State Council of the People's Republic of China approved the proposal of Shandong Province to absorb Laiwu Into Jinan. Laiwu was demoted from being a City and its two district-level subdivisions became districts of Jinan. The former Laicheng District of Laiwu became Laiwu District of Jinan, and Gangcheng District of Jinan replaced the former Gangcheng District of Laiwu City, sharing with it the same name and administrative area.

== Climate ==
Jinan has a humid continental climate (Köppen: Dwa), with four well-defined seasons. The city is dry and nearly rainless in spring, hot and rainy in summer, crisp in autumn and dry and cold (with little snow) in winter. The average annual temperature is 14.9 °C (58.8 °F), and the annual precipitation is 734 millimetres (28.9 in), with a strong summer maximum, and high variability from year to year. January is the coldest and driest month, with a mean temperature of −0.3 °C (31.5 °F) and 5.0 millimetres (0.20 in) of equivalent rainfall. July is the hottest month, with a mean temperature of 27.4 °C (81.3 °F). With monthly percent possible sunshine ranging from 40% in July to 58% percent in May, the city receives 2,226 hours of bright sunshine annually.

Due to the mountains to the south of the city, temperature inversions are common, occurring on about 200 days per year. The high precipitation for northern Chinese standards, in tandem with the topography (mountains surrounding the city on three sides), leads to particularly oppressive summer weather and the city being named as a candidate for the fourth "furnace", c.e. Three Furnaces. Extremes since 1951 have ranged from −19.7 °C (−3 °F) on 17 January 1953, to 42.5 °C (109 °F) on 24 July 1955.

Climate data for Jinan (Changqing District), elevation 99 m (325 ft), (1991–2020 normals, extremes 1951–present)
Month	Jan	Feb	Mar	Apr	May	Jun	Jul	Aug	Sep	Oct	Nov	Dec	Year
Record high °C (°F)	20.2 (68.4)	25.7 (78.3)	30.2 (86.4)	36.3 (97.3)	39.7 (103.5)	41.2 (106.2)	42.5 (108.5)	40.7 (105.3)	38.5 (101.3)	33.7 (92.7)	26.5 (79.7)	23.1 (73.6)	42.5 (108.5)
Mean maximum °C (°F)	11.7 (53.1)	17.5 (63.5)	24.3 (75.7)	30.1 (86.2)	34.6 (94.3)	37.8 (100.0)	36.6 (97.9)	35.4 (95.7)	32.3 (90.1)	27.2 (81.0)	20.1 (68.2)	13.9 (57.0)	38.6 (101.5)
Mean daily maximum °C (°F)	4.2 (39.6)	8.2 (46.8)	14.8 (58.6)	21.5 (70.7)	27.1 (80.8)	31.8 (89.2)	32.0 (89.6)	30.4 (86.7)	27.0 (80.6)	21.2 (70.2)	12.9 (55.2)	5.8 (42.4)	19.7 (67.5)
Daily mean °C (°F)	−0.7 (30.7)	2.9 (37.2)	9.1 (48.4)	15.7 (60.3)	21.5 (70.7)	26.2 (79.2)	27.4 (81.3)	25.8 (78.4)	21.6 (70.9)	15.5 (59.9)	7.9 (46.2)	1.1 (34.0)	14.5 (58.1)
Mean daily minimum °C (°F)	−4.6 (23.7)	−1.4 (29.5)	4.2 (39.6)	10.4 (50.7)	16.2 (61.2)	21.0 (69.8)	23.3 (73.9)	22.0 (71.6)	17.2 (63.0)	11.0 (51.8)	3.8 (38.8)	−2.7 (27.1)	10.0 (50.1)
Mean minimum °C (°F)	−9.4 (15.1)	−6.7 (19.9)	−1.3 (29.7)	5.4 (41.7)	11.2 (52.2)	16.3 (61.3)	20.9 (69.6)	20.1 (68.2)	13.8 (56.8)	7.0 (44.6)	−0.8 (30.6)	−6.8 (19.8)	−10.6 (12.9)
Record low °C (°F)	−19.7 (−3.5)	−16.5 (2.3)	−11.3 (11.7)	−1.9 (28.6)	4.2 (39.6)	10.9 (51.6)	14.0 (57.2)	12.8 (55.0)	6.4 (43.5)	0.0 (32.0)	−10.1 (13.8)	−16.0 (3.2)	−19.7 (−3.5)
Average precipitation mm (inches)	5.0 (0.20)	10.1 (0.40)	9.4 (0.37)	34.1 (1.34)	61.3 (2.41)	82.9 (3.26)	189.0 (7.44)	160.2 (6.31)	60.1 (2.37)	27.3 (1.07)	23.7 (0.93)	6.5 (0.26)	669.6 (26.36)
Average precipitation days (≥ 0.1 mm)	2.6	3.6	3.2	5.0	6.4	7.9	11.8	10.7	7.4	5.3	4.5	2.9	71.3
Average snowy days	2.8	3.4	0.8	0.1	0	0	0	0	0	0	0.9	2.1	10.1
Average relative humidity (%)	56	53	48	52	56	57	73	78	71	62	61	58	60
Mean monthly sunshine hours	152.6	155.2	209.9	234.9	259.6	233.1	195.7	198.0	187.0	188.9	162.6	155.2	2,332.7
Percentage possible sunshine	49	50	56	59	59	53	44	48	51	55	54	52	53
Source: China Meteorological Administration

Climate data for Jinan (Laiwu District), elevation 229 m (751 ft), (1991–2020 normals, extremes 1981–2010)
Month	Jan	Feb	Mar	Apr	May	Jun	Jul	Aug	Sep	Oct	Nov	Dec	Year
Record high °C (°F)	17.3 (63.1)	21.1 (70.0)	28.5 (83.3)	32.9 (91.2)	36.2 (97.2)	38.7 (101.7)	39.9 (103.8)	36.6 (97.9)	35.7 (96.3)	33.9 (93.0)	25.0 (77.0)	18.5 (65.3)	39.9 (103.8)
Mean daily maximum °C (°F)	3.9 (39.0)	7.5 (45.5)	13.8 (56.8)	21.0 (69.8)	26.6 (79.9)	30.5 (86.9)	31.2 (88.2)	30.0 (86.0)	26.3 (79.3)	20.4 (68.7)	12.4 (54.3)	5.5 (41.9)	19.1 (66.4)
Daily mean °C (°F)	−1.4 (29.5)	1.9 (35.4)	7.9 (46.2)	14.9 (58.8)	20.8 (69.4)	25.0 (77.0)	26.6 (79.9)	25.4 (77.7)	21.0 (69.8)	14.7 (58.5)	7.1 (44.8)	0.5 (32.9)	13.7 (56.7)
Mean daily minimum °C (°F)	−5.4 (22.3)	−2.5 (27.5)	2.8 (37.0)	9.4 (48.9)	15.2 (59.4)	19.8 (67.6)	22.7 (72.9)	21.6 (70.9)	16.6 (61.9)	10.0 (50.0)	2.9 (37.2)	−3.3 (26.1)	9.2 (48.5)
Record low °C (°F)	−19.3 (−2.7)	−17.0 (1.4)	−10.3 (13.5)	−3.8 (25.2)	2.4 (36.3)	9.6 (49.3)	12.7 (54.9)	12.0 (53.6)	6.3 (43.3)	−3.6 (25.5)	−12.4 (9.7)	−18.0 (−0.4)	−19.3 (−2.7)
Average precipitation mm (inches)	5.6 (0.22)	11.8 (0.46)	13.1 (0.52)	30.2 (1.19)	54.5 (2.15)	94.3 (3.71)	190.3 (7.49)	183.9 (7.24)	69.1 (2.72)	28.1 (1.11)	25.2 (0.99)	8.5 (0.33)	714.6 (28.13)
Average precipitation days (≥ 0.1 mm)	2.5	3.5	3.6	5.6	6.8	8.3	12.7	12.5	7.4	5.7	4.5	3.4	76.5
Average snowy days	4.0	3.1	1.7	0.3	0	0	0	0	0	0	1.2	2.6	12.9
Average relative humidity (%)	56	53	49	50	54	59	74	76	69	63	62	59	60
Mean monthly sunshine hours	158.4	159.8	207.1	228.0	250.7	212.5	175.7	180.5	184.3	189.6	161.7	158.4	2,266.7
Percentage possible sunshine	51	52	56	58	57	49	40	44	50	55	53	53	52
Source: China Meteorological Administration

== Administrative divisions ==
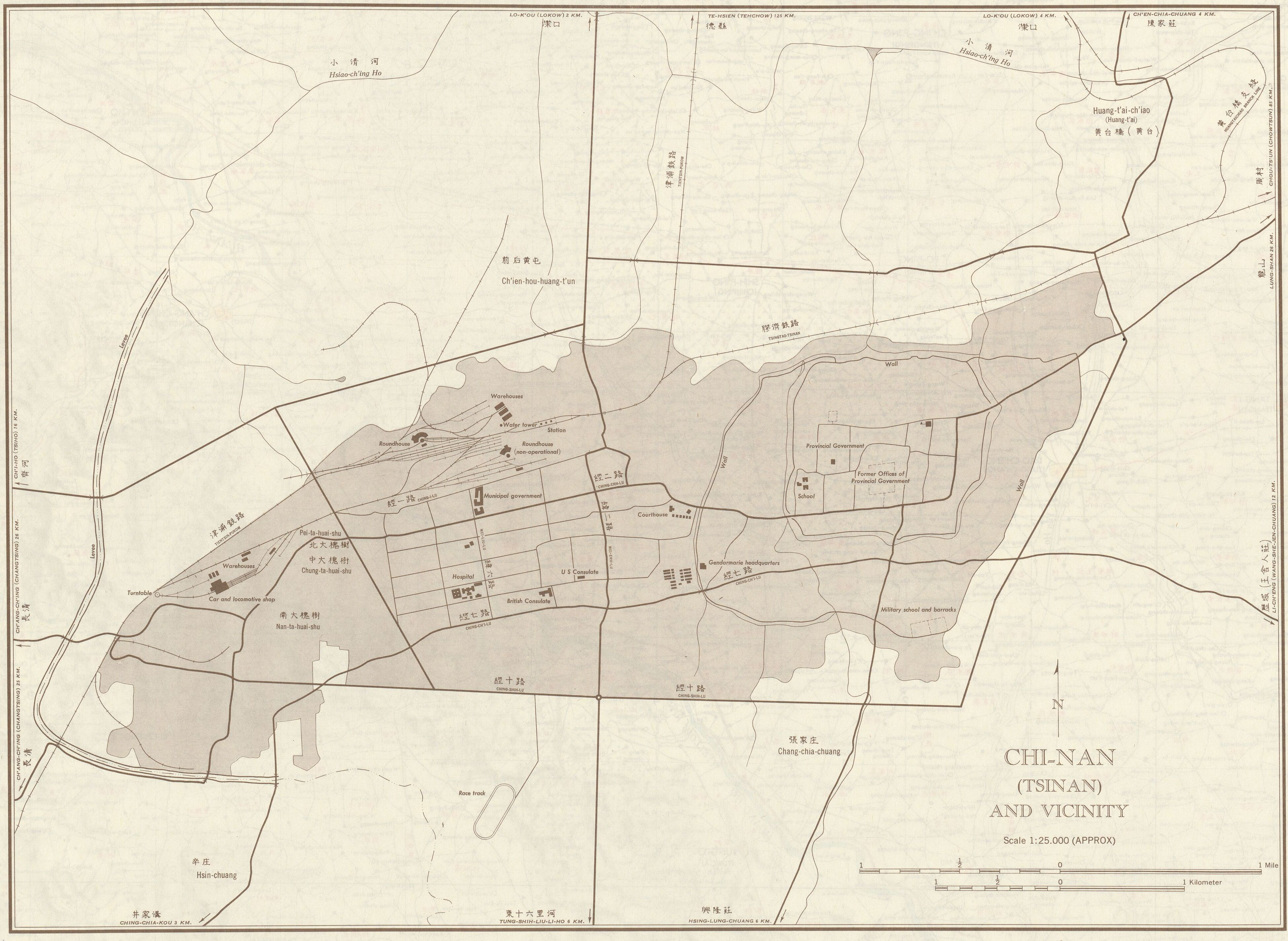
Map of Jinan (labeled as CHI-NAN (TSINAN))

The sub-provincial city of Jinan has direct jurisdiction over ten districts and 2 counties after the annexation of Laiwu to Jinan in 2019:

Subdivision	Simplified Chinese	Hanyu Pinyin	Population (2010)	Area (km^{2})	Dens. (/km^{2})
Inner city
Lixia District	历下区	Lìxià Qū	754,136	101.18	7476.13
Shizhong District	市中区	Shìzhōng Qū	713,581	281.49	2545.51
Huaiyin District	槐荫区	Huáiyìn Qū	476,811	151.61	3144.13
Tianqiao District	天桥区	Tiānqiáo Qū	688,415	258.97	2660.94
Inner suburbs
Licheng District	历城区	Lìchéng Qū	1,124,306	1301.21	862.27
Changqing District	长清区	Chángqīng Qū	578,740	1208.59	478.88
Jiyang District	济阳区	Jǐyáng Qū	517,948	1098.81	472.09
Outer suburbs
Zhangqiu District	章丘区	Zhāngqiū Qū	1,064,210	1719.09	618.26
Laiwu District	莱芜区	Láiwú Qū	989,535	1739.61	518.93
Gangcheng District	钢城区	Gāngchéng Qū	308,994	506.42	910.04
Rural counties
Pingyin County	平阴县	Píngyīn Xiàn	331,712	715.06	463.81
Shanghe County	商河县	Shānghé Xiàn	564,125	1162.40	484.98

These are further divided into 146 township-level divisions, including 65 towns, 27 townships and 54 subdistricts.

== Economy ==
With the shift of the Yellow River to a new bed right to the north of Jinan (in 1852) and the establishment of a railroad hub, the city became a major market for agricultural products from the productive farming regions to the north. Following the trade in agricultural goods, the city developed a textile and clothing industry, flour mills, oil presses, as well as factories producing paper, cement, and matches. In the 1950s, large iron and steel works as well as chemical factories were established around Jinan. The large metal works produce pig iron, ingot steel, as well as finished steel. In the 1970s, Sinotruk established its headquarters and factories for the production of trucks and construction vehicles in the city.

=== General economy ===
Jinan has long stably ranked third in Shandong Province, and before the merger with Laiwu City in 2019, Jinan surpassed Yantai to become the second largest economy in the province.

- According to data from the National Bureau of Statistics yearbook, the city's total economic output in 2007 was 256.3 billion yuan, with the primary, secondary, and tertiary industries accounting for 5.9%, 45.2%, and 48.9% respectively.
- In 2008, Jinan achieved a GDP of 301.7 billion yuan, ranking sixth among provincial capitals, behind Guangzhou (821.5), Hangzhou (478.1), Wuhan (396.0), Chengdu (390.1), and Nanjing (377.5).
- In 2009, Jinan's GDP reached 335.0 billion yuan, an increase of 11.3% over 2008, ranking 21st nationwide and 7th among provincial capitals. Among provincial capitals and municipalities, it followed Shanghai (1,490.09), Beijing (1,186.59), Guangzhou (911.27), Tianjin (750.08), Chongqing (652.87, of which Chongqing urban core 569.74), Hangzhou (508.8), Wuhan (456.0), Chengdu (450.26), Shenyang (435.9), Nanjing (423.02), and Changsha (374.5), but ahead of Zhengzhou (330.0).
- In 2011, the city's GDP was 440.629 billion yuan, an increase of 10.6% over the previous year. Calculated per permanent resident, the per capita GDP was 64,331 yuan, up 8.9%, equivalent to 9,960 US dollars.
- In 2016, Jinan's GDP reached 653.61 billion yuan, an increase of 7.8% over the previous year. Per permanent resident, GDP was 90,999 yuan, up 6.5%; converted at the average annual exchange rate, it equaled 13,700 US dollars.
- In 2022, Jinan's GDP reached 1,202.75 billion yuan, an increase of 3.1% at constant prices. The added value of the primary industry was 42.05 billion yuan (up 3.1%); the secondary industry 418.02 billion yuan (up 3.2%); and the tertiary industry 742.67 billion yuan (up 3.0%). The industrial structure ratio was 3.5:34.8:61.7.
- In 2024, the city's GDP reached 1,352.76 billion yuan, an increase of 5.4% at constant prices compared with the previous year. The added value of the primary industry was 44.0 billion yuan (up 3.6%); the secondary industry 451.92 billion yuan (up 5.8%); and the tertiary industry 856.84 billion yuan (up 5.2%). The industrial structure ratio was 3.3:33.4:63.3.

Regional composition of Jinan's Gross domestic product in 2024
Division	Gross domestic product (billion yuan)	Share (%)
Jinan	1352.76	100.00
Lixia	257.78	19.05
Shizhong	138.44	10.23
Huaiyin	87.99	6.50
Tianqiao	84.46	6.24
Licheng	140.88	10.41
Changqing	45.60	3.37
Zhangqiu	130.13	9.61
Jiyang	34.86	2.57
Laiwu	103.64	7.66
Gangcheng	36.01	2.66
Pingyin	33.31	2.46
Shanghe	28.81	2.12
Jinan High-Tech Zone	205.35	15.18
Qibu Zone (direct administration)	17.83	1.31
Southern Mountain Area	7.67	0.56

=== Industry ===
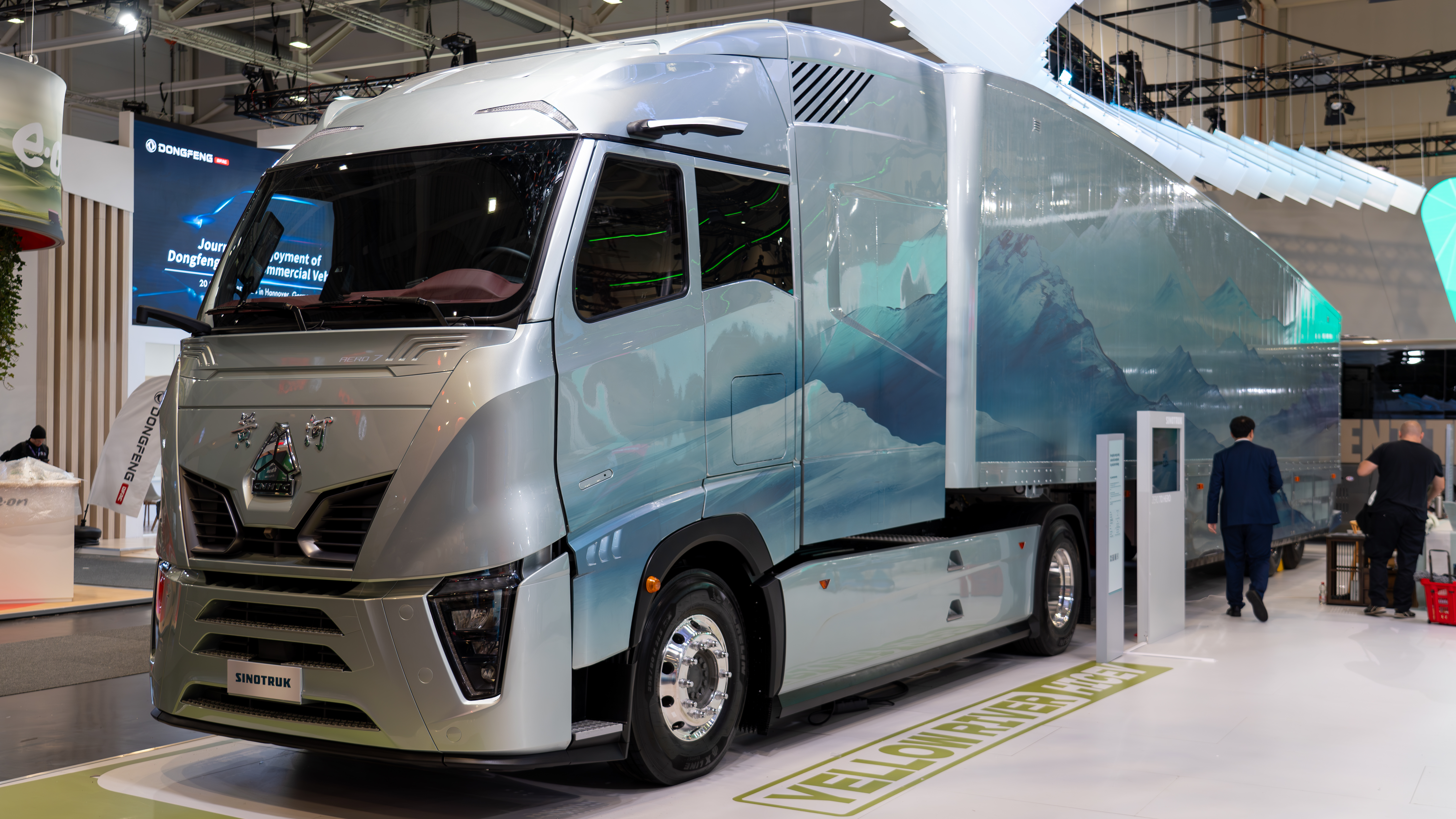
Sinotruk Yellow River produced by the Sinotruk Group

Currently, Jinan's major large-scale industrial enterprises include:

==== Heavy industry ====
- Shandong Energy Group
- Shandong Electric Power Corporation
- Shandong Heavy Industry
- Shandong Iron and Steel Group
- Shandong Gold Group
- China National Heavy Duty Truck Group
- Sinopec Jinan Branch
- Shandong Hi-Speed Group

==== Light industry ====
- Inspur Group
- Joyoung

=== Industrial zones ===
Industrial zones include:

- Jinan High-tech Industrial Development Zone

Founded in 1991, the Jinan High-tech Industrial Development zone was one of the first of its kind approved by the State Council. The zone is located to the east of the city and covers a total planning area of 83 km^{2} (32 sq mi) that is divided into a central area covering 33 km^{2} (13 sq mi), an export processing district of 10 km^{2} (3.9 sq mi), and an eastern extension area of 40 km^{2} (15 sq mi). Since its foundation, the Jinan High-tech Industrial Development Zone has attracted enterprises as LG, Panasonic, Volvo, and Sanyo. In 2000, it joined the world science and technology association and set up a China-Ukraine High-tech Cooperation Park. The Qilu Software Park became the sister park of Bangalore park of India.

- Jinan Export Processing Zone

The export processing zone is located in the eastern suburbs of Jinan, to the east of the Jinan High-tech Industrial Development Zone and to the north of the Jiwang highway. The distances to the Jiqing Highway and the Jinan Airport are 9 km (5.6 mi) and 18 km (11 mi) respectively.

== Demographics ==
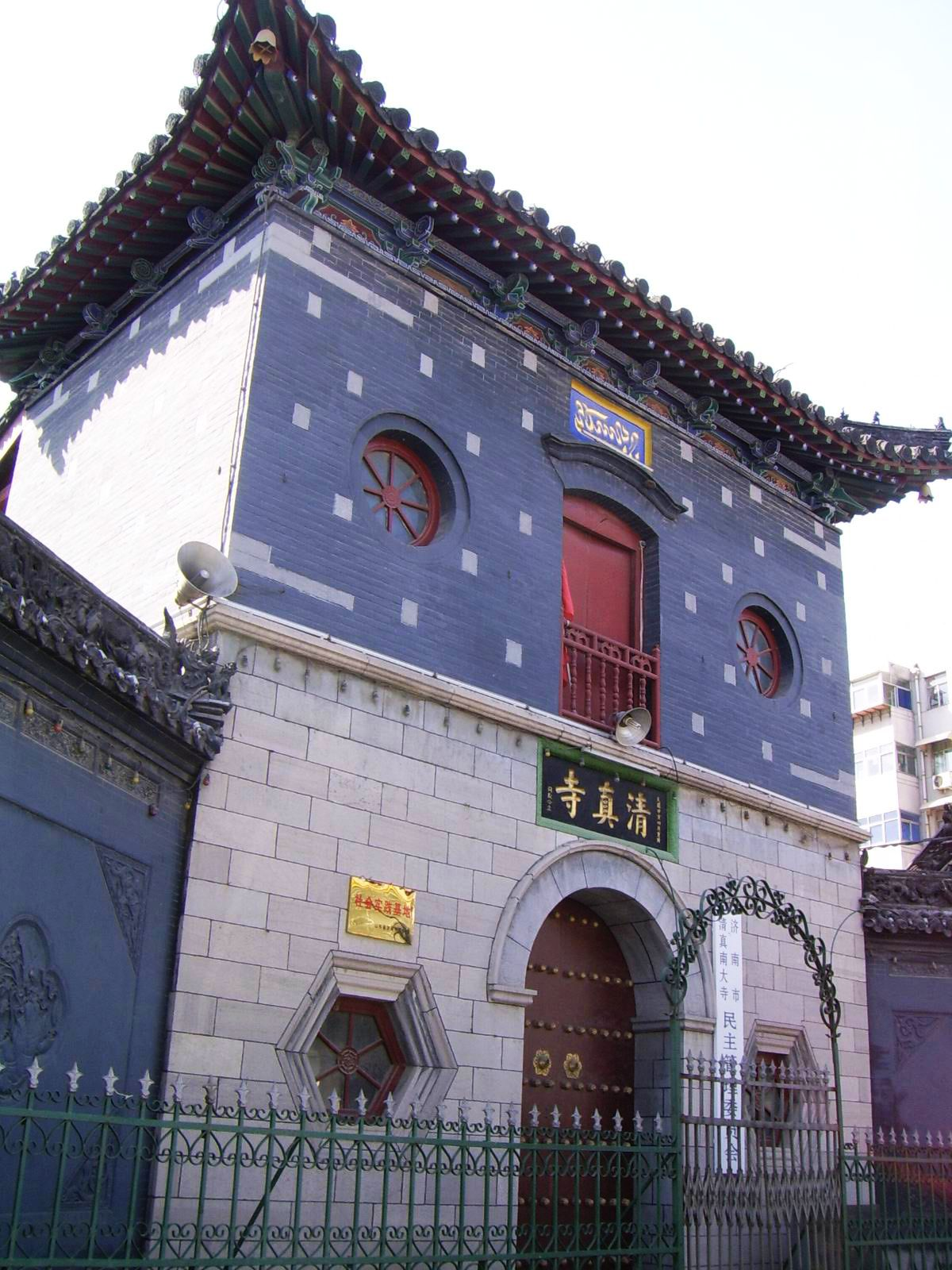
The Great Southern Mosque, the oldest mosque in Jinan.

As of the 2020 Chinese census, its total population (including Laiwu City merged recently) was 9,202,432 inhabitants and its built-up (or metro) area made of 6 out of 10 urban districts (Jiyang, Zhangqiu, Laiwu and Gangcheng not yet conurbated) was home to 5,452,335 inhabitants, most of them with Han ethnicity.

== Transportation ==
=== Railways ===
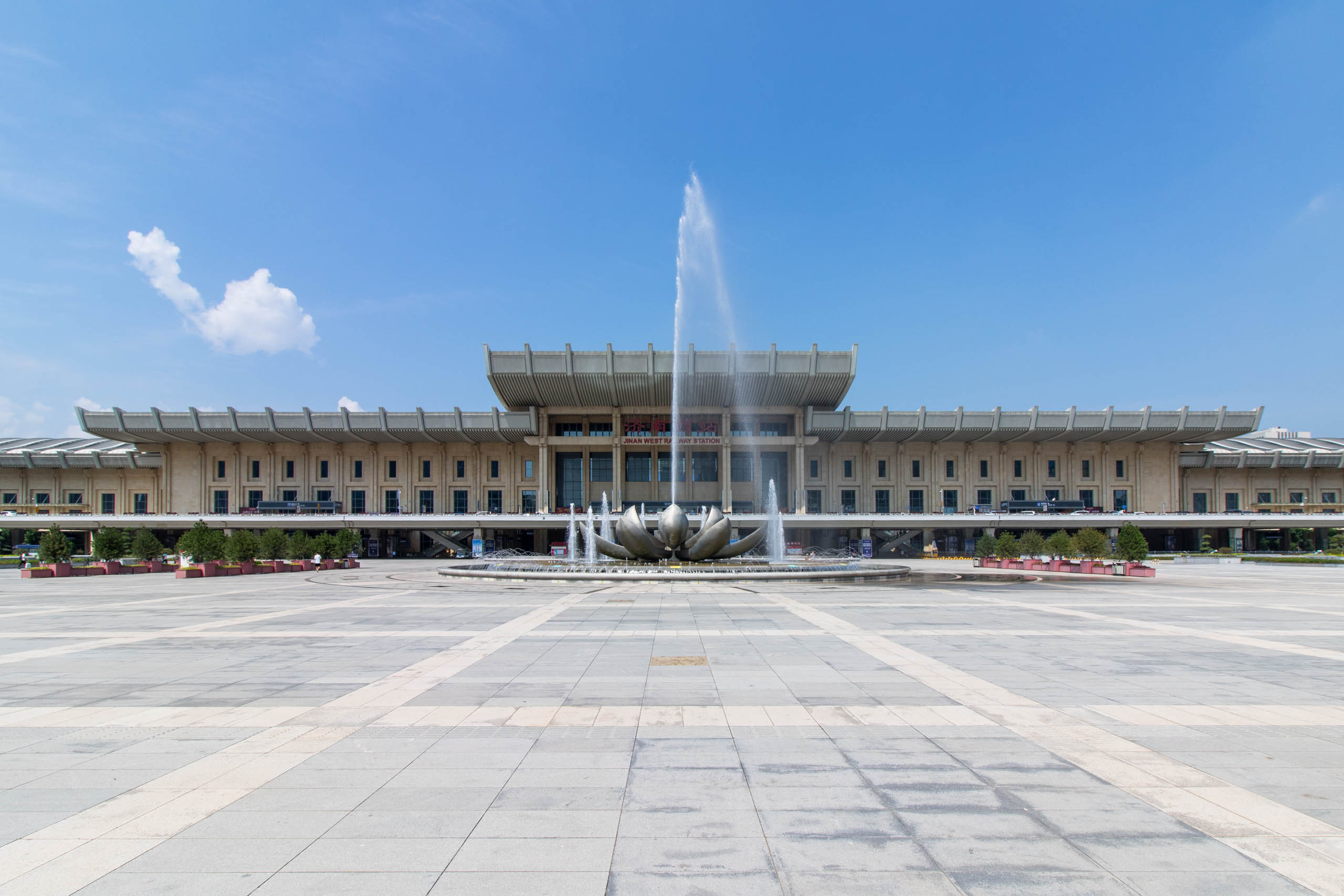
Jinan West Railway Station

Jinan is positioned at the intersection of two major railways: The Jinghu Railway that runs from Beijing to Shanghai is the major north–south backbone of the railway system in eastern China. In Jinan, it intersects with the Jiaoji Railway that connects Jinan to the sea port of Qingdao to the east. In addition, the Hanji Railway connects Jinan to the city of Handan (Hebei Province) in the west. Within Shandong province, the Jinghu Railway connects Jinan with the cities of Dezhou, Tai'an, Jining, and Zaozhuang. The Jiaoji Railway provides a link to the cities of Zibo, Qingdao, and Weifang and the Hanji Railway serves the cities of Yancheng and Liaocheng.

Central Jinan is served by Jinan railway station, Jinan East railway station, and Daminghu railway station (just by Daming Lake).

The Beijing–Shanghai high-speed railway calls at Jinan West railway station, which is outside the central metropolitan center and is in suburban western Jinan's Huaiyin District. Since it opened for public service on 30 June 2011, it has become a future hub with west–east running high speed railways to Taiyuan, Shijiazhuang and Qingdao. Jinan East railway station opened in 2018. An additional station, Jinan North railway station, is planned.

=== Metro ===
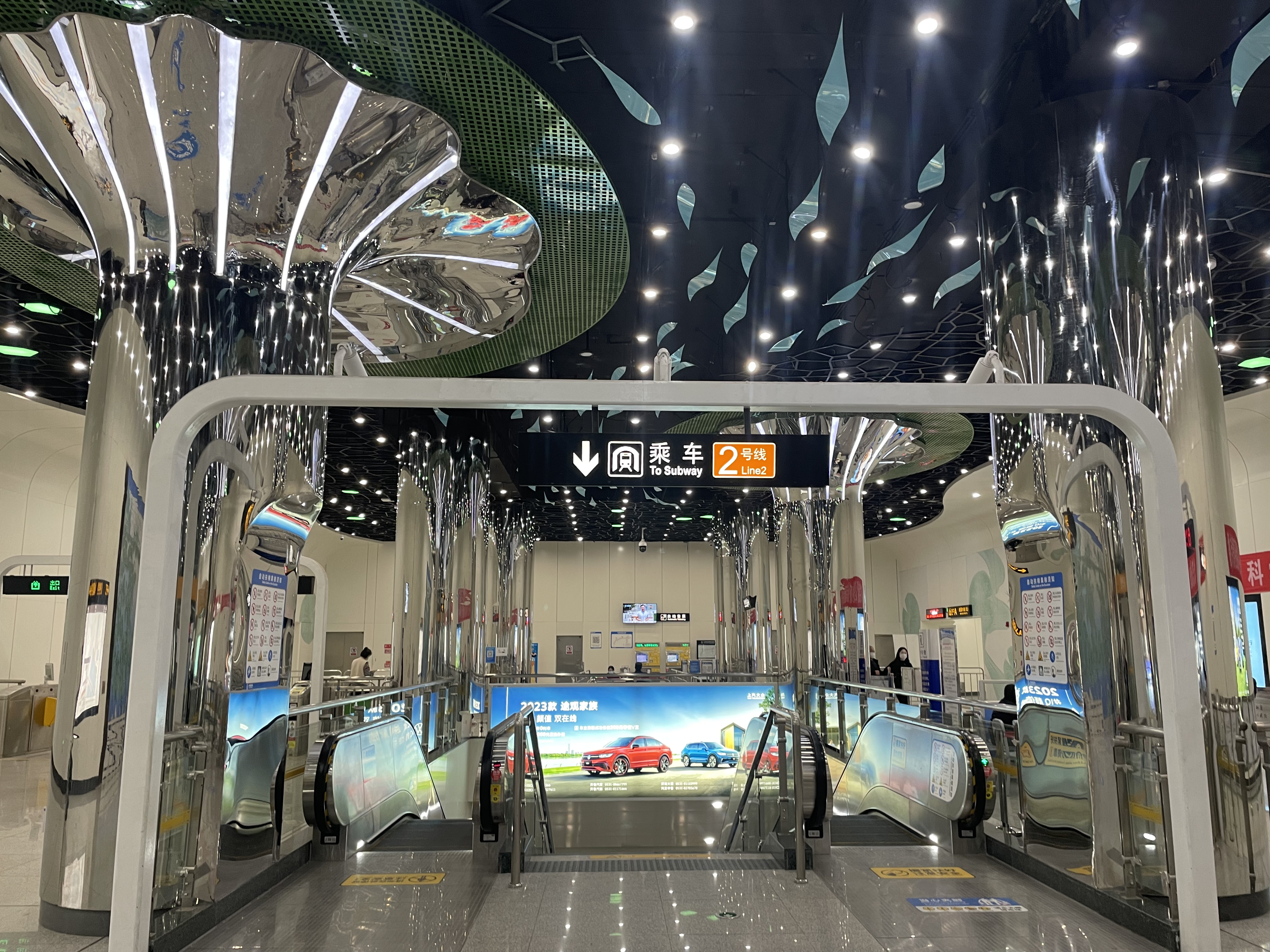
Beiyuan Station on the Jinan Metro

Construction of the Jinan Metro started in 2013, and it officially opened in 2019. Currently, Lines 1, 2, 3, 4, 6, 8, the Jiyang Line, and the SkyShuttle Line 1 are operational, with a total of 140 stations.

=== Expressways ===
Major expressways include China National Highway 104, China National Highway 220, and China National Highway 309. Because of Jinan's location and role as a road and rail transportation hub, the Jinan Coach Terminus has one of the largest passenger flows nationally. On peak travel days, as many as 92,000 passengers per day have been counted, on off-peak days the number is around 42,000 passengers per day.

=== Airport ===
Jinan Yaoqiang International Airport is located about 33 km (21 mi) northeast of the city center and located in Yaoqiang Subdistrict of Licheng District, Jinan, from which the name of the airport is derived. The airport is connected to the city center of Jinan by expressways. It has domestic flights to many of the major cities in China as well as to international destinations, in particular Helsinki, Osaka, Seoul, Paris, Los Angeles, Bangkok and Singapore.

=== Buses ===
The conventional buses in the city have air-conditioned and non-air-conditioned buses. Air-conditioned lines have a K prefix on their route numbers. From 2018, most lines are air-conditioned lines (Include lines without K perfix). These lines comprise more than 200 routes covering the whole city.

== Culture and contemporary life ==
=== Dialect ===
Local residents in the city proper, as well as in the surrounding areas, have traditionally spoken the Jinan dialect of Mandarin that is not readily understood even by native speakers of standard Mandarin. The younger people of Jinan are more likely to speak standard Mandarin, whereas many older residents retain strong local dialect elements in their speech. Nevertheless, even the younger residents of Jinan tend to retain a strong local accent and mix local vocabulary into the standardized Mandarin vocabulary. Due to the influx of migrant workers during the past decade of China's economic boom, many of the current population that are of working age are not natives of Jinan but have learned to understand the Jinan dialect.

=== Cuisine ===
Jinan has its own cuisine, the Jinan style of the Shandong cuisine, one of the Eight Culinary Traditions of China. One of its features is the use of soup in its dishes. Modern cuisines in northern China —Beijing, Tianjin and the northeastern regions including Heilongjiang, Jilin and Liaoning— are all branches of Shandong cuisine.

=== Shopping centers ===
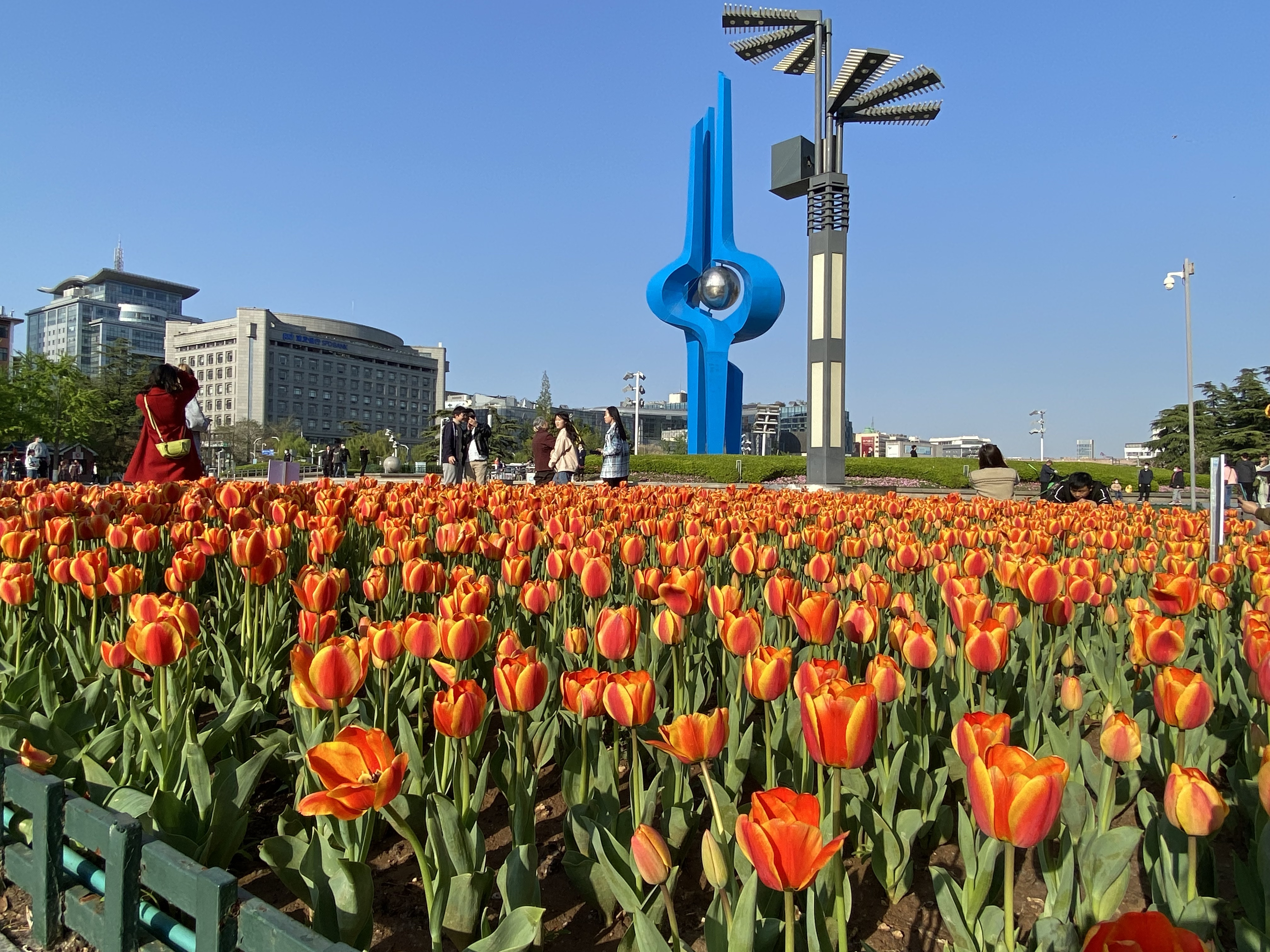
Spring City Square

Most shopping malls in Jinan are in the downtown area centered around Spring City Square and Quancheng Road (泉城路; 'spring city road'). City of Springs Square was built by the municipal government beside the city moat in the early 21st century; at the center is the statue "Spring" which has become a symbol of Jinan. The square borders on the ancient city moat. It has a music fountain, a 46,000 square meter underground shopping center and a memorial hall with statues of famous people from Shandong.

City of Springs Road was rebuilt at the same time that City of Springs Square was created. The government's intention was to create a modern business district and yet preserve the traditional Chinese culture. Therefore, newly built shopping malls with traditional Chinese architectural styles and modern western skyscrapers can be found side by side along City of Springs Road. Notable retail businesses are Quancheng Bookstore – the largest bookstore of the city – and Walmart (near the western end of City of Springs Road). Major shopping malls along the road are the Guihe Shopping Center (贵和商厦), the Sofitel Silver Plaza, the Shimao international shopping center, and the Wanda Shopping Mall (万达集团). Parc 66 (济南恒隆广场) to the south of City of Springs Road (opposite of Water Lily Street), opened in August 2011, is Jinan's largest shopping mall with seven levels of retail space and a total gross floor area of 171,000 square meters.

== Main tourist attractions ==
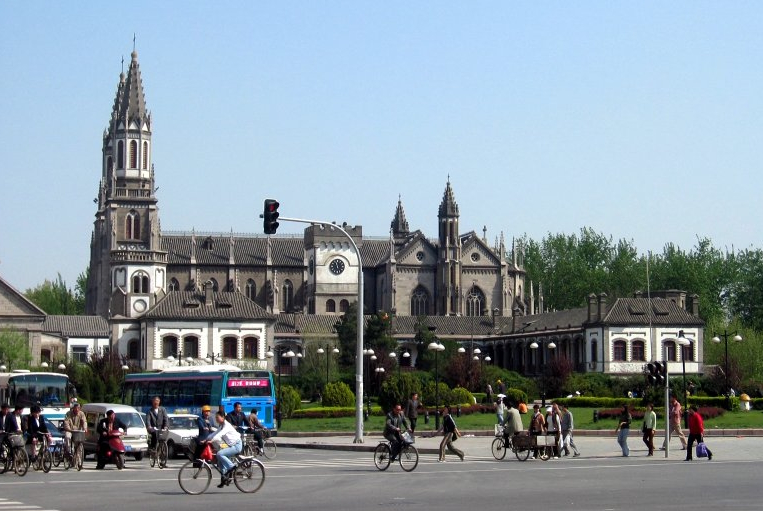
Sacred Heart Cathedral, Jinan

Jinan is renowned across China for its numerous springs, the lakes fed by the spring water, and the weeping willows that grow along the water edges. The late-Qing author Liu E describes Jinan's cityscape in his novel "The Travels of Lao Can" (老残游记, written 1903–04, published in 1907) as "Every family has spring water, every household has a willow tree". Jinan was also the historical center of Buddhist culture for the whole province which is still manifest in the many historic sites that are left behind in its southern counties.

=== Springs and lakes ===
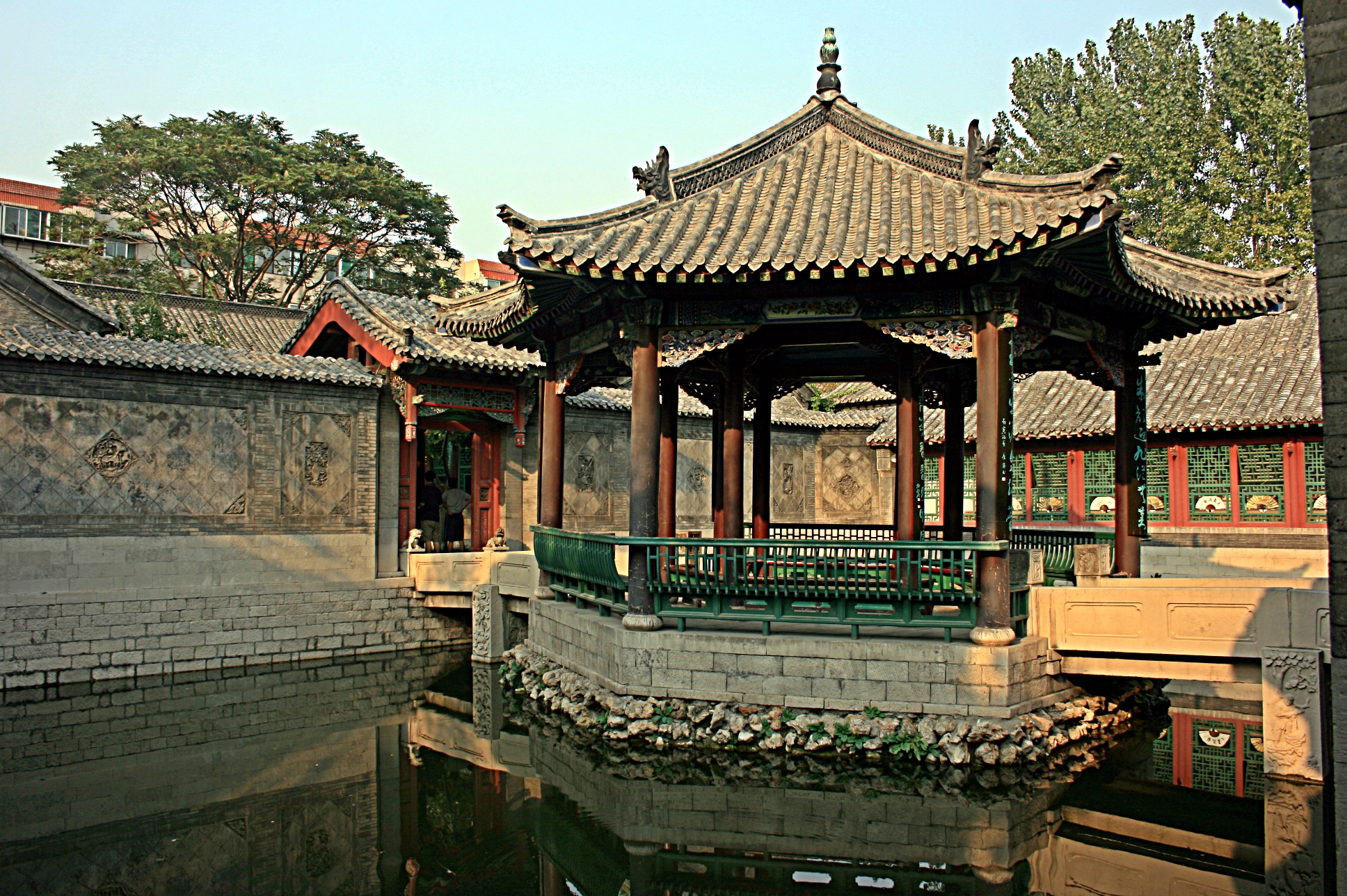
Pavilion in the 10,000 Bamboo Garden of Baotu Spring Park

Jinan is known as the "City of Springs" because of the large number of natural artesian springs. The majority of the springs, many of which have been historically listed under the "72 Famous Springs" (七十二名泉) are concentrated in the downtown district and flow north to converge in Daming Lake. The Baotu Spring Park is the most popular of the springs in the City of Jinan proper. Besides the Baotu Spring, the park contains several other springs that are listed among the "72 Famous Springs". "Bào tū" (趵突) means "jumping and leaping" in Chinese. The water in the spring pool can be seen foaming and gushing, looking like a pot of boiling water. The spring was visited by the Qianlong Emperor (1711–1799) of the Qing dynasty who declared it "the best spring under the heaven" (Chinese: 天下第一泉; pinyin: tiān xià dì yī quán). A tablet with the Emperor's handwriting "Baotu Spring" has since been erected beside the spring pool.

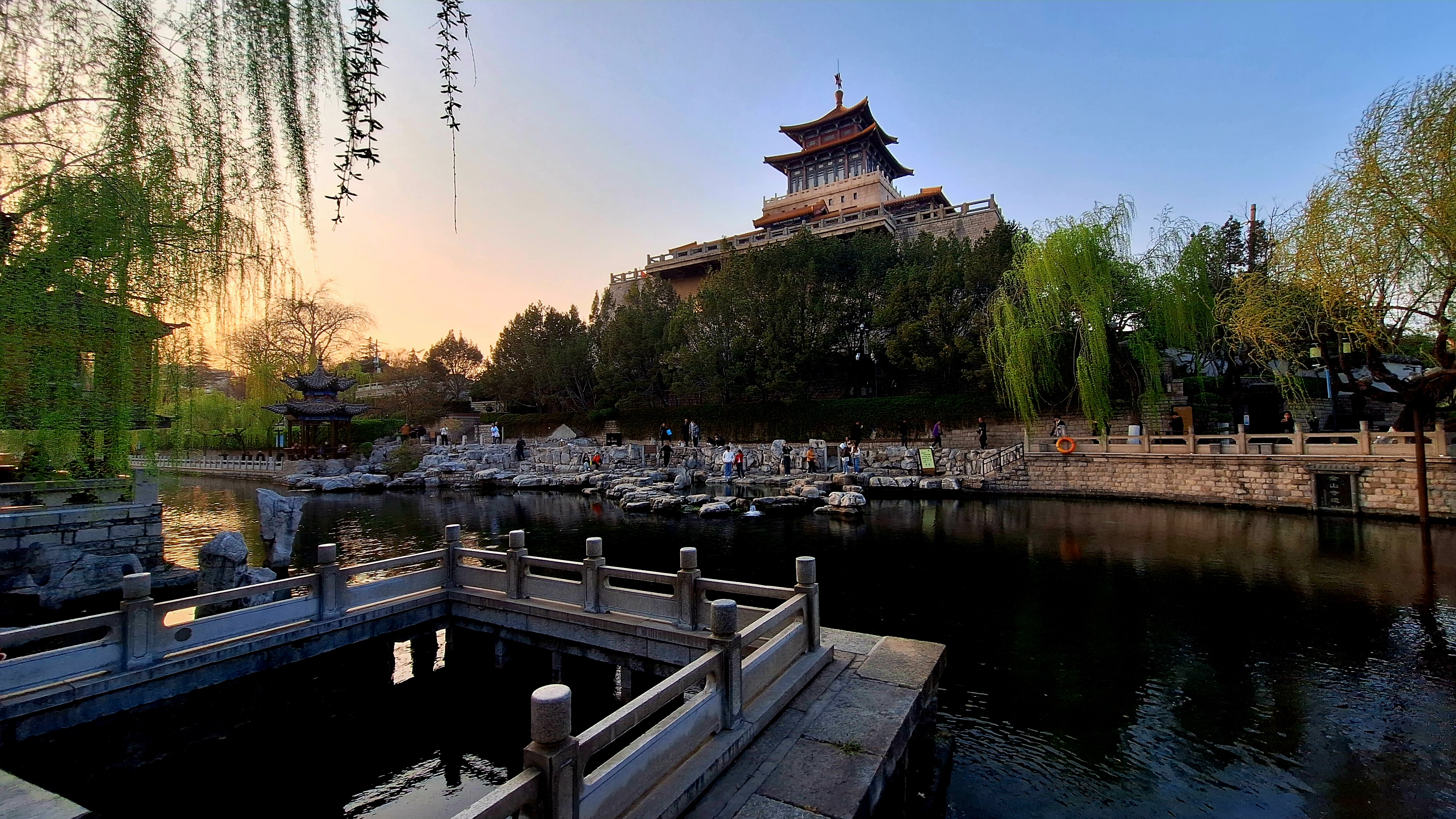
The Liberation Pavilion overlooking Black Tiger Spring

Not far away to the northeast of Baotu Spring Park is the Daming Lake, which, together with Baotu Spring and the Thousand-Buddha Mountain is often regarded as the "Three Greatest Attractions in Jinan". Other notable parks in the city include the Five Dragon Pool (五龙潭) near the Baotu Spring Park, the Black Tiger Spring (黑虎泉) on the southern city moat, and the Baimai Springs (百脉泉) of Zhangqiu City to the east of Jinan.

=== Museums and libraries ===
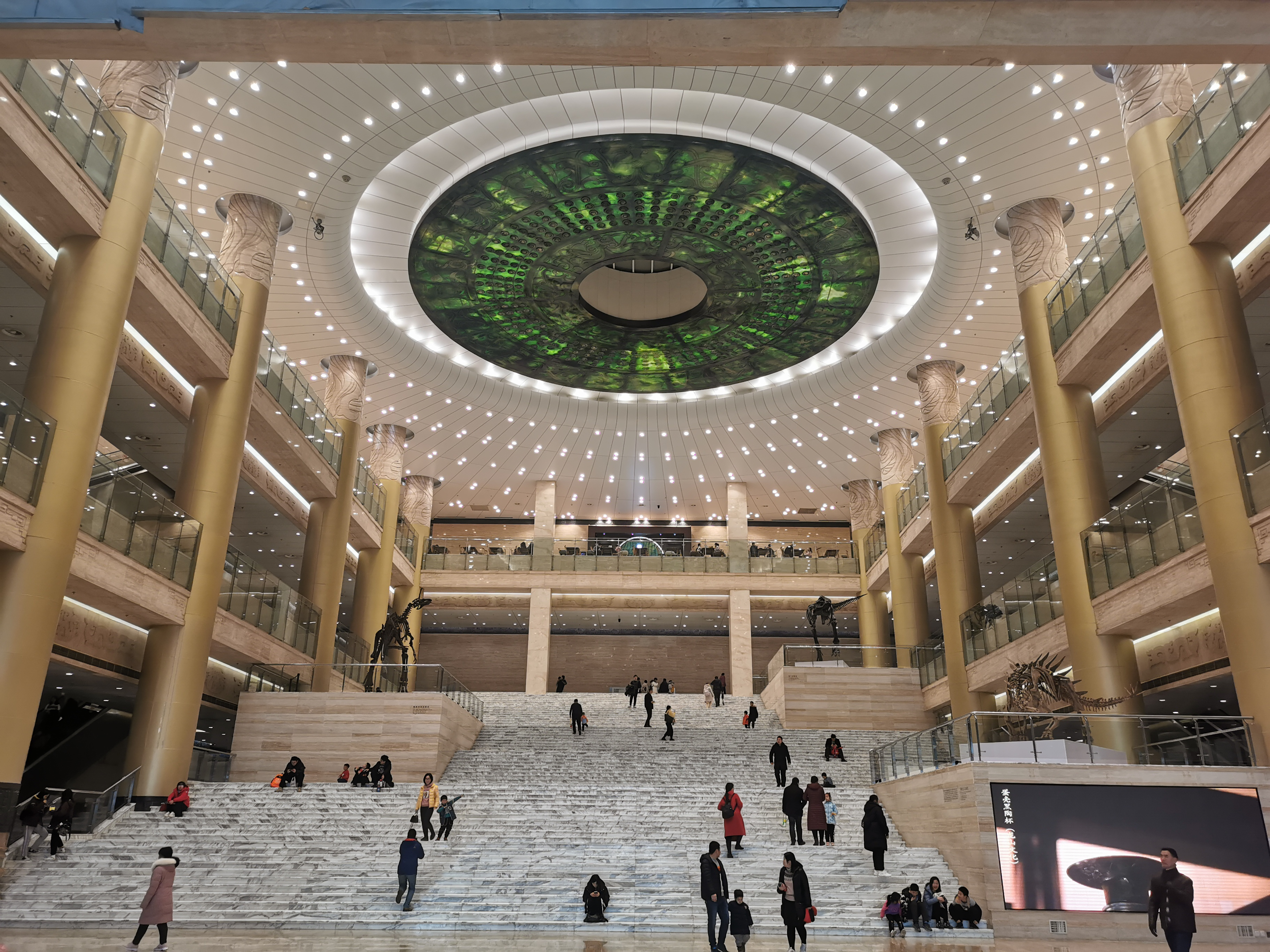
Hall of Shandong Provincial Museum

The Shandong Provincial Museum located at the foothill of Thousand-Buddha Mountain is the largest museum in the province. It has a large collection of natural as well as historical treasures from the whole province. The museum was established in its present form in 1982 and currently has 8 exhibition halls: "Treasures of Shandong Province"; "Stone Sculptures"; "Warship of the Ming dynasty"; "Ancient Coins"; "Art Treasures"; "Fossil Collections"; "Dinosaurs"; and "Specimens". The museum has more than 210,000 relics and specimens, making up ⅓ of the collections in museums of whole province.

The Jinan Municipal Museum is located at the south-western foot of the Thousand-Buddha Mountain, in the north of the city center. Although much smaller than the provincial museum, the municipal museum still houses a collection of more than 20,000 items, most of which were recovered in the city area. The Shandong Art Museum is a large museum of fine arts built near the Provincial Museum.

The Shandong Provincial Library in the eastern High-tech Park (address: 2912 Second Ring East Road) is the principal library of the province and is ranked among the Top 10 Chinese libraries. As of 2004, the library had more than 5.18 million documents, many of which date back many centuries and are important sources for research on Chinese history. The library also has a large collection of western journals/books. Originally, the library was built close to Daming Lake in 1909 by the then governor of Shandong. In the late 1990s, a project was undertaken to move the library to the eastern part of the city, and it reopened in 2002 with 35 reading rooms and more than 2000 seats.

=== Parks and Nature Reserves ===
Jinan Hundred Miles Yellow River Scenic Area is located in No.166 Luokou Huancheng Road in Tianqiao District. It is designed as an ecological cultural theme park which focuses on ecological tourism, cultural tourism, and healthy tourism. The Yellow River of this section stretches 51.98 kilometers. Jinan Hundred Miles Yellow River Scenic Area was awarded the title "Fifty Scenes of the Yellow River in China" on 12 September 2018. The Levee extending along the Yellow River in this scenery area, is praised as "the Great Wall over water".

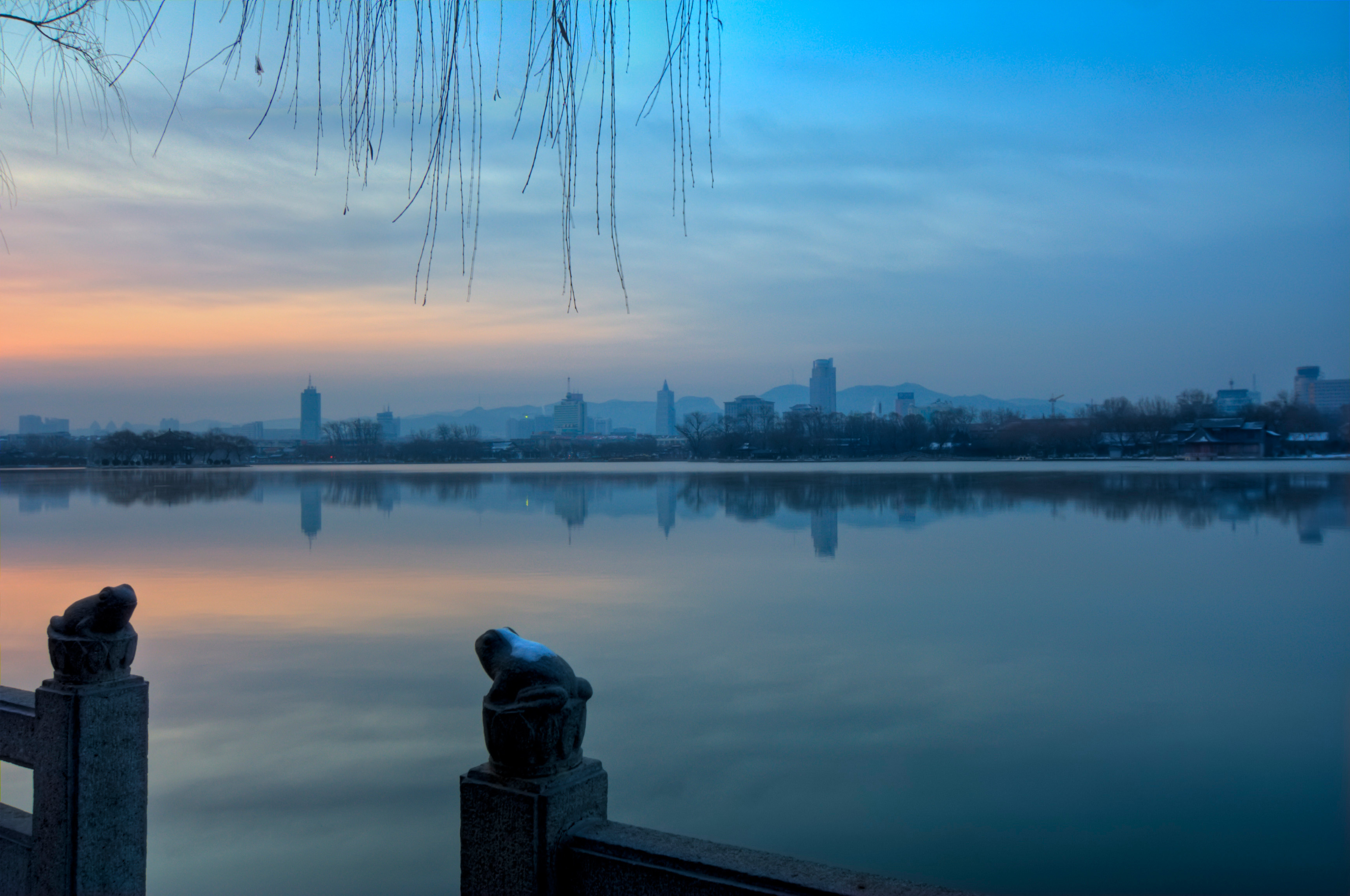
Daming Lake

Yellow River Forest Park (Jinan) is located on the north bank of the Yellow River. The Yellow River Forest Park sprawls over 1500mu (100 hectares) and has 300,000 trees of various breeds. Yellow River Forest Park is the only park equipping with a forest racecourse, which has a course of 3 Li (unit), in Jinan City. Yellow River Forest Park provides not only an area covering 5000 square meters for visitors to freely barbecue but also a fishing pond covering 1,800 square meters. Visitors can participate in various activities here, such as roller skating, cue sports, table tennis, archery, shooting, etc.

Daming Lake Park is located in the center of Jinan City, covering an area of 46.5 hectares. Daming Lake Park is considered one of the three must-see tourist spots of Jinan (the others are Baotu Spring Park and Thousand Buddha Mountain). Daming Lake Park has many scenic spots, such as the Daming Lake and the Lixia Pavilion. Daming Lake is a natural lake consisting of many springs. It is unique because the lake has constant water level unaffected by heavy rains or drought. Lixia Pavilion, which was built in the Northern Wei period, is in the center of the Daming Lake. There are so many ancient buildings in Daming Lake Park that it has a title describing them, which is "One terrace, three gardens, three towers, four ancestral halls, six isles, seven bridges and ten pavilions".

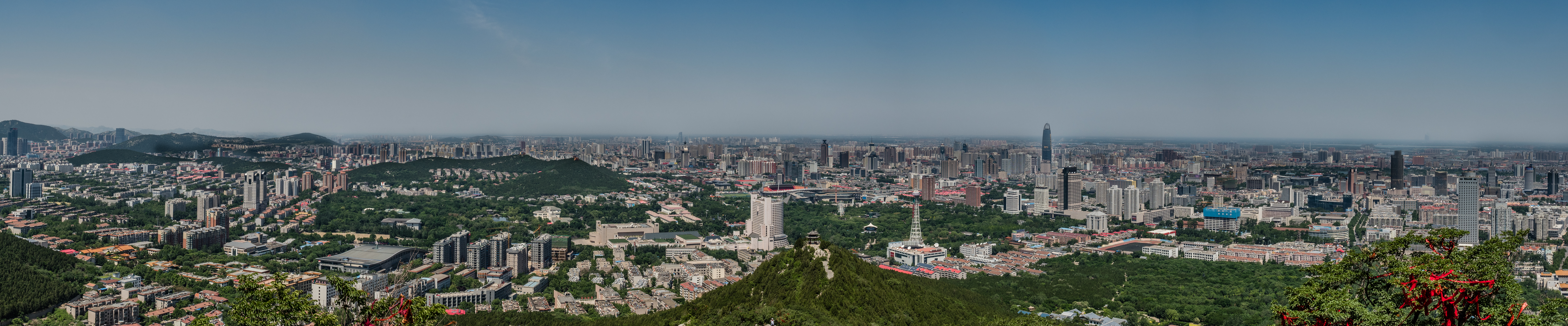
Panorama of Jinan, taken in 2015

== Education and research ==
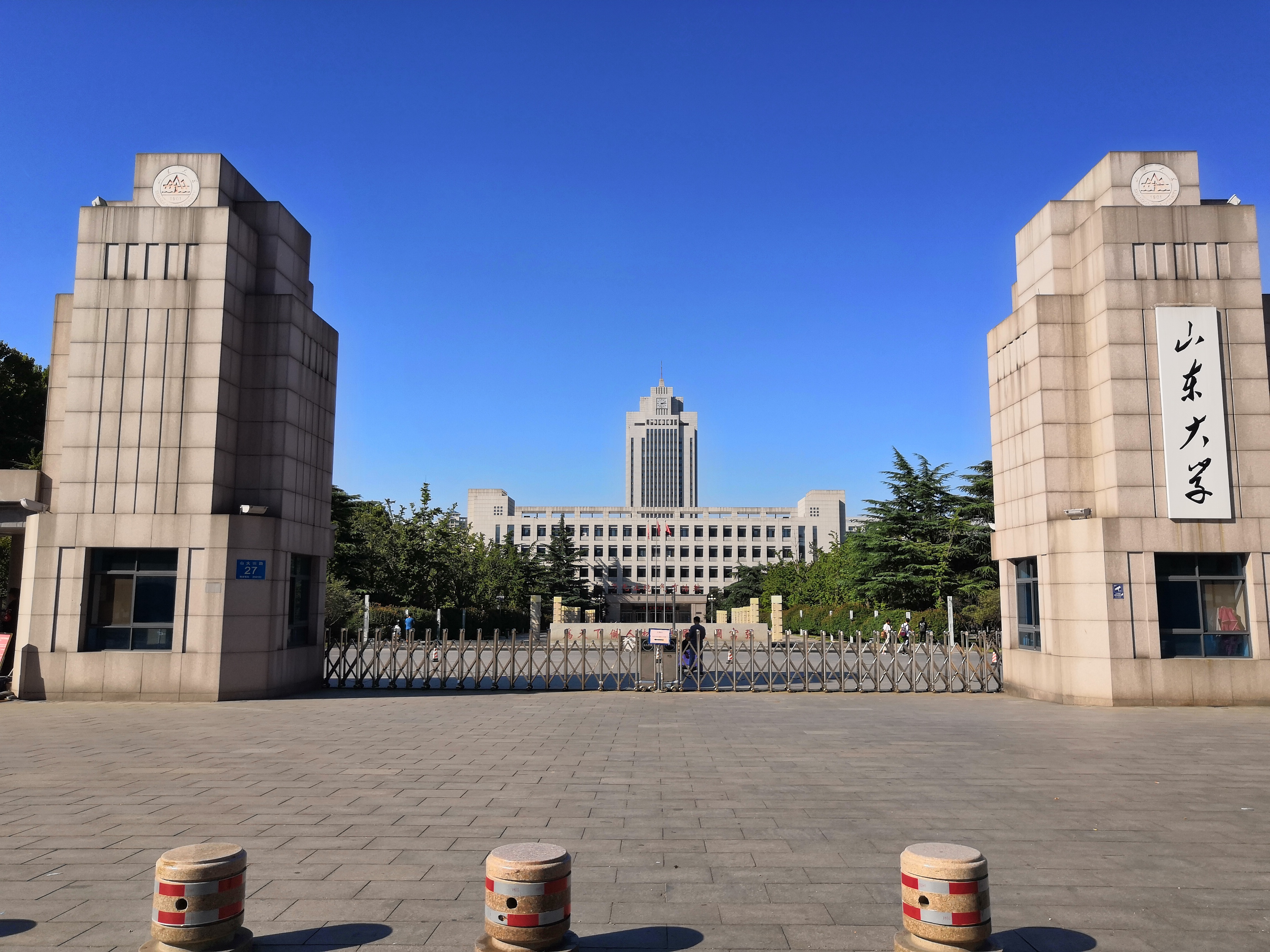
Central Campus of Shandong University

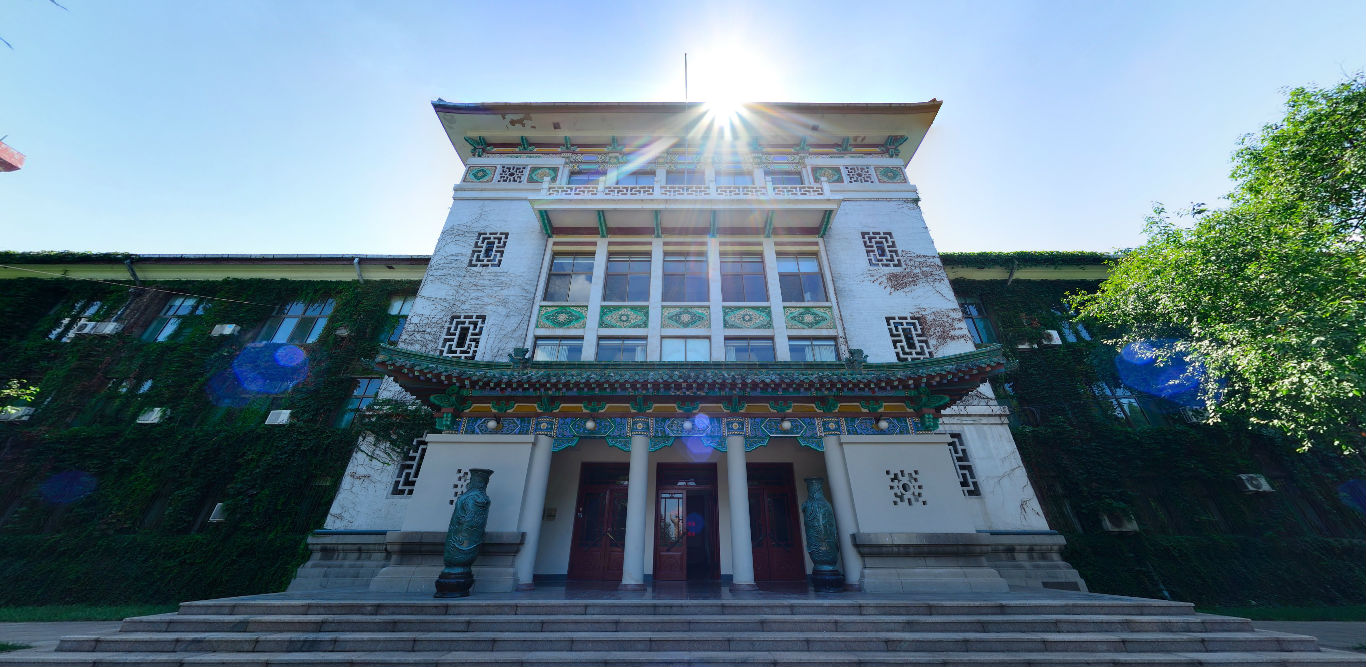
Shandong Normal University

Jinan is listed as the # 27 city in the world for scientific research as tracked by the Nature Index according to the Nature Index 2025 Science Cities. Notably, Shandong University is one of China's most prestigious universities as a member of the former Project 985 and the current Double First-Class Construction.

=== Universities and colleges ===
- Qilu Normal University (齐鲁师范学院, formerly Shandong Educational Institute: 山东教育学院)
- Qilu University of Technology (山东轻工业学院, or Shandong Polytechnic University)
- Shandong Architectural Institute (山东建筑大学)
- Shandong College of Electronic Technology (山东电子职业技术学院)
- Shandong Jiaotong University (山东交通学院)
- Shandong Normal University (山东师范大学)
- Shandong Polytechnic (济南铁道职业技术学院, formerly Jinan Railway Polytechnic)
- Shandong Sport University (山东体育学院)
- Shandong University
- Shandong University of Art and Design (山东工艺美术学院)
- Shandong University of Arts (山东艺术学院)
- Shandong University of Finance and Economics
- Shandong University of Science and Technology, which also has campuses in Qingdao and Tai'an.
- Shandong University of Traditional Chinese Medicine
- Shandong Women's University
- University of Jinan

=== Provincial high schools ===
- Shandong Experimental High School
- Jinan Foreign Language School
- The High School Affiliated to Shandong Normal University (山东师范大学附属中学)

== Sports ==
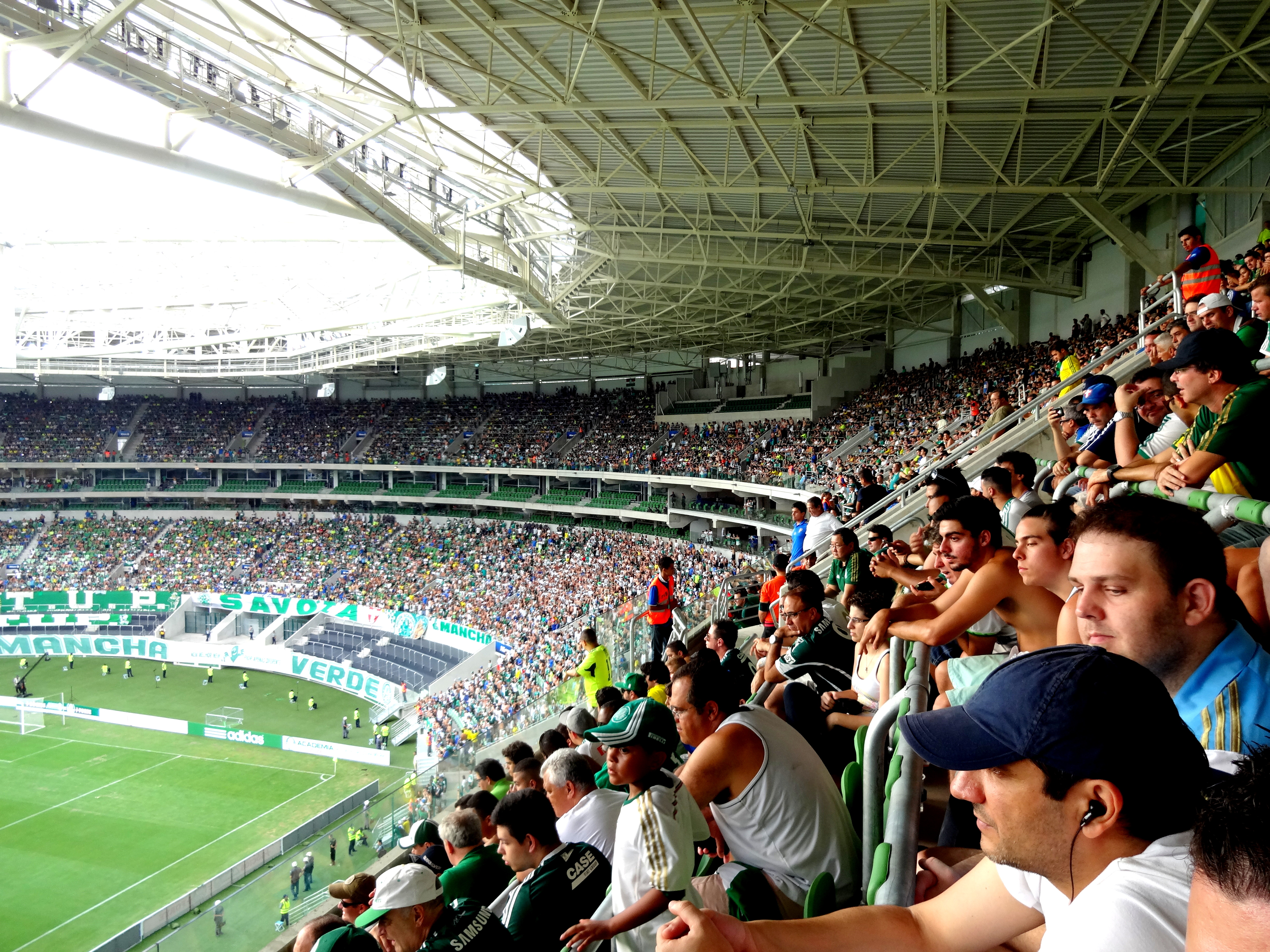
Palmeiras v. Shandong Luneng in 2015

The most renowned sports team in Jinan is Shandong Hi-Speed Kirin. They have been playing in the Chinese Basketball Association (CBA) since 1995. In the 2012–13 CBA season they reached the final, but lost 4–0 to Guangdong Southern Tigers.

The Shandong Taishan Football Club is the most widely known football team in Jinan. The club currently plays in the highest tier of Chinese football, the Chinese Super League. They have been playing in the top tier for every season since the league became professional in 1994. Shandong Taishan has won five top division titles, eight Chinese FA Cups, and one Chinese FA Super Cup. Jinan was also one of four host cities of China during the 2004 AFC Asian Cup.

In 2009, Jinan hosted the 2009 National Games of China, the premier sports event at the national level in China and the first major multi-sports event held in China after the 2008 Summer Olympics in Beijing. The National Games' main venue was the Jinan Olympic Sports Center.

Since 2014, Jinan has also been known as the site of China's national winter swimming festivals at Daming Lake, since 2016 organized in cooperation with the International Winter Swimming Association (IWSA). In the 2019–20 season, Jinan hosted the 8th Winter Springs-swimming International Invitational.

== International relations ==
=== Twin towns – sister cities ===
- Augsburg, Bavaria, Germany (29 January 2004)
- Coventry, England, United Kingdom (5 May 1983)
- Joondalup, Western Australia, Australia (4 September 2004)
- Kazanlak, Stara Zagora Province, Bulgaria (21 January 2013)
- Kharkiv, Ukraine (31 July 2006)
- Kfar Saba, Israel (16 July 2007)
- Marmaris, Muğla Province, Turkey (19 September 2011)
- Nizhny Novgorod, Russia (22 September 1994)
- Port Moresby, Papua New Guinea (29 February 1988)
- Porto Velho, State of Rondônia, Brazil (19 September 2011)
- Praia, Santiago Island, Cape Verde (9 April 2009)
- Regina, Saskatchewan, Canada (29 January 1985)
- Rennes, Brittany Region, France (24 March 2000)
- Sacramento, California, United States (2 October 1984)
- Suwon, Gyeonggi Province, South Korea (16 June 1993)
- Vantaa, Uusimaa, Finland (22 December 2000)
- Vitebsk, Belarus (17 August 2009)
- Wakayama, Honshu, Japan (20 April 1982)
- Yamaguchi, Honshu, Japan (22 March 1985)
- Nagpur, Maharashtra, India (8 December 2017)
- Arba Minch, Southern Nations, Nationalities, and Peoples' Region, Ethiopia (4 September 2018)

=== Partner cities ===
- Novi Sad, South Bačka District, Serbia (2 June 2025)

== Notable people ==
- Fu Sheng (268–178 BC), Confucianism scholar
- Xin Qiji (1140-1207), famous poet
- Li Qingzhao (1084-1155), famous poet
- Zhang Yanghao (1270–1329), famous author
- Yan Ping (1956-), painter
- Gong Li (1956-), actress

== Bibliography ==
- de Crespigny, Rafe (2010). Imperial warlord : a biography of Cao Cao 155–220 AD. Leiden Boston: Brill. ISBN 978-90-04-18522-7.
- Iriye, Akira (1990) [1965]. After Imperialism: The Search for a New Order in the Far East, 1921-1931 (Reprinted ed.). Chicago: Imprint Publications. pp. 193–205. ISBN 978-1879176003.
