= Daming Lake =

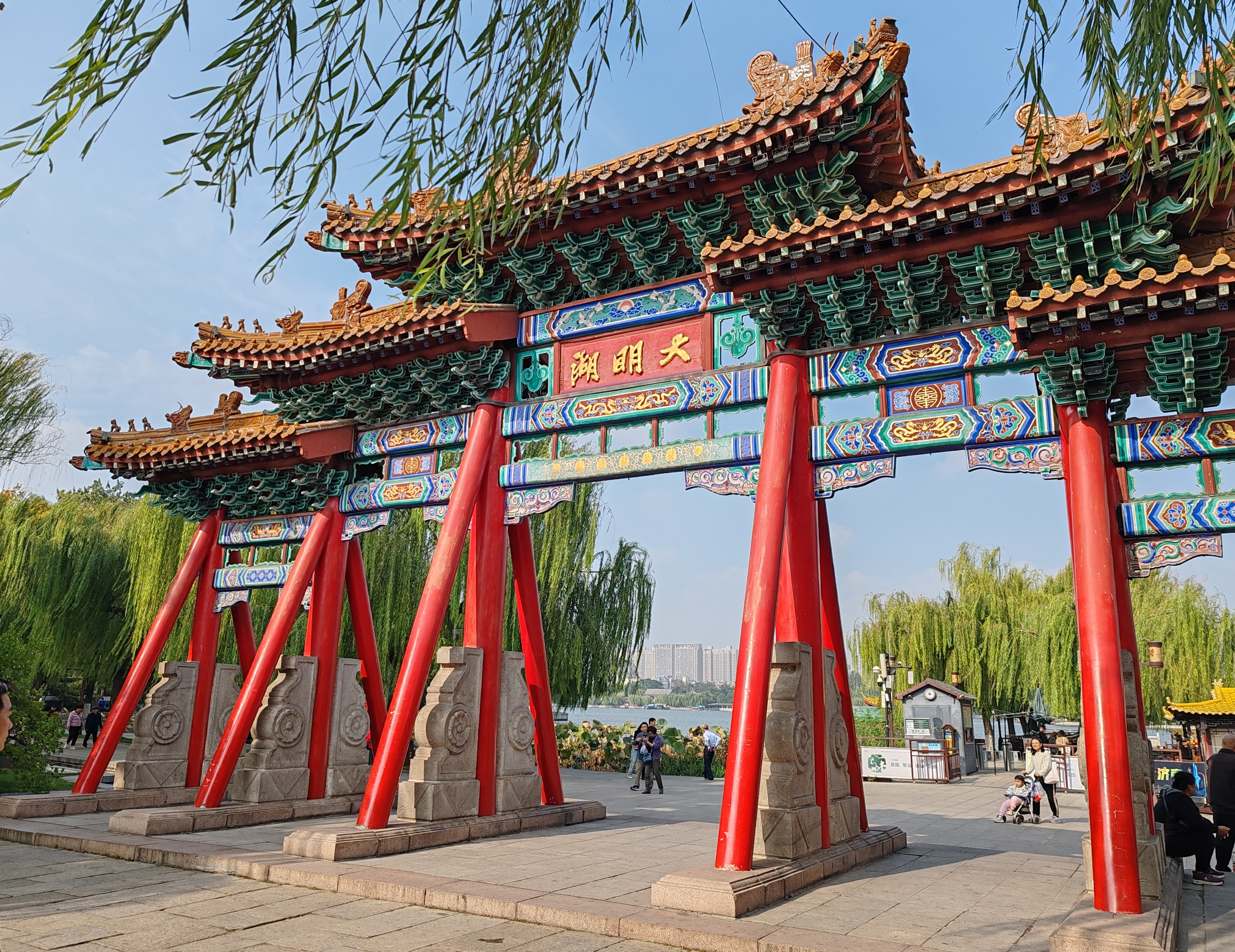
- Paifang at the South Gate of Daming Lake

- Location within Shandong
- Location: Jinan
- Coordinates: 36°40′29″N 117°01′04″E
- Type: natural freshwater lake
- Basin countries: China
- Surface area: 46 ha (110 acres)
- Average depth: 3 m (9.8 ft)
- Islands: several

Daming Lake (Chinese: 大明湖; pinyin: Dàmíng Hú; Wade–Giles: Ta^{⁴}-ming^{²} Hu^{²}; lit. 'Lake of the Great Splendour') is the largest lake in the city of Jinan, capital of Shandong, China and one of city's main natural and cultural landmarks and tourist attraction. Located to the north of the historical city center, the lake is fed by the artesian karst springs of the area and hence retains a fairly constant water level through the entire year.

== Islands ==
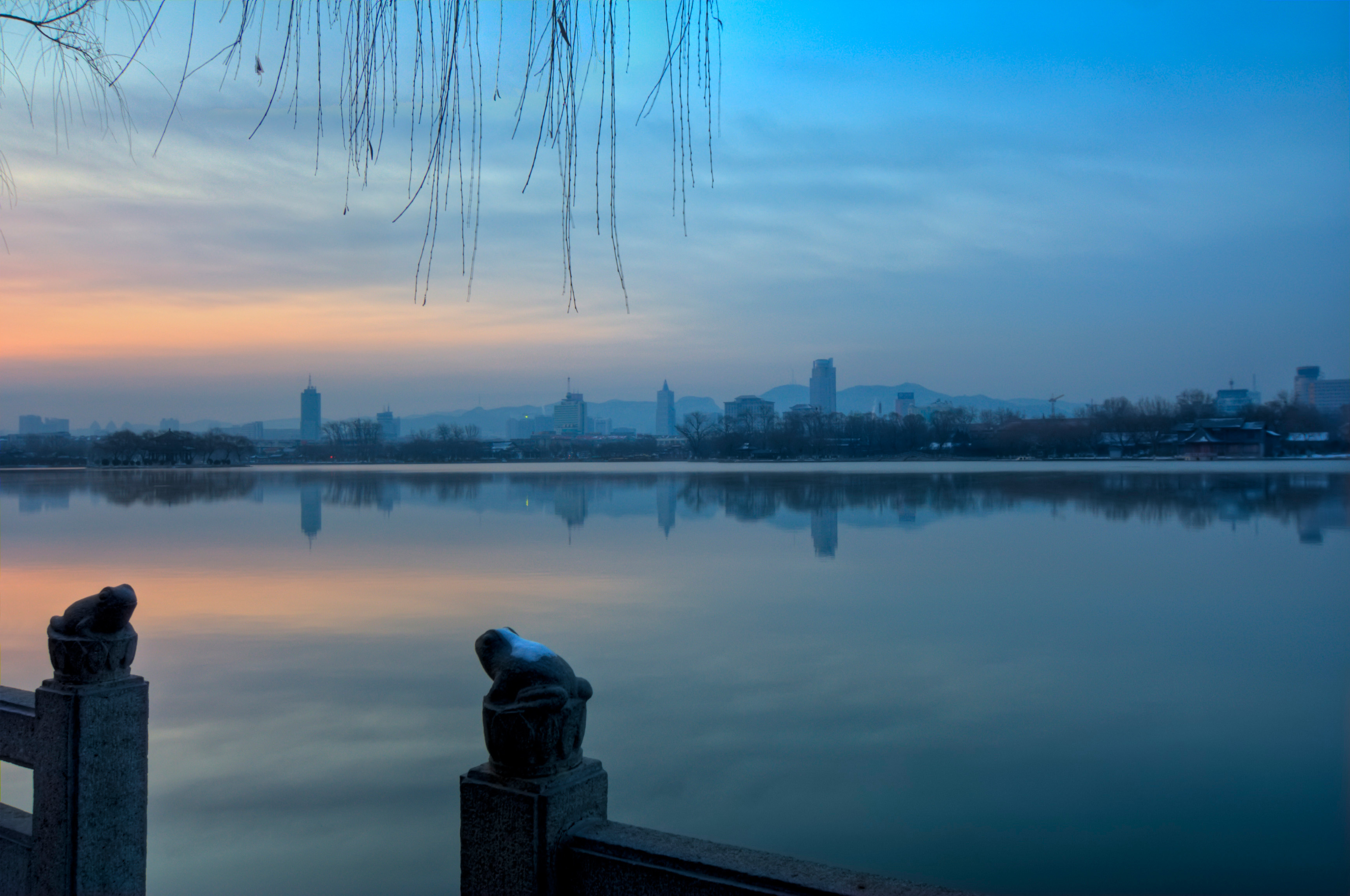
Reflection of the mountains in Daming Lake at sunrise

Located in the lake are nine small islands:

- Cuiliuping Island (Chinese: 翠柳屏岛; pinyin: Cuìliǔpíng Dǎo), also known as (Chinese: 四棵柳岛; pinyin: Sì Kēliǔ Dǎo; lit. 'Four-Willow Island')
- Niaoqingqiqi Island (Chinese: 鸟禽憩栖岛; pinyin: Niǎoqínqìqī Dǎo; lit. 'Bird Resting Island')
- Guting Island (Chinese: 古亭岛; pinyin: Gǔtíng Dǎo; lit. 'Ancient Pavilion Island'), the location of the Lixia Pavilion
- Mingshi Island (Chinese: 名士岛; pinyin: Míngshì Dǎo)
- Huiquan Island (Chinese: 汇泉岛; pinyin: Huìquán Dǎo)
- Huxin Island (Chinese: 湖心岛; pinyin: Húxīn Dǎo; lit. 'Lake Center Island')
- Jiaxuan Island (Chinese: 稼轩岛; pinyin: Jiaxuān Dǎo)
- Qiuliu Island (Chinese: 秋柳岛; pinyin: Qiūliǔ Dǎo)
- Huju Island (Chinese: 湖居岛; pinyin: Hújū Dǎo; lit. 'Lake Residence Island')

== Buildings ==
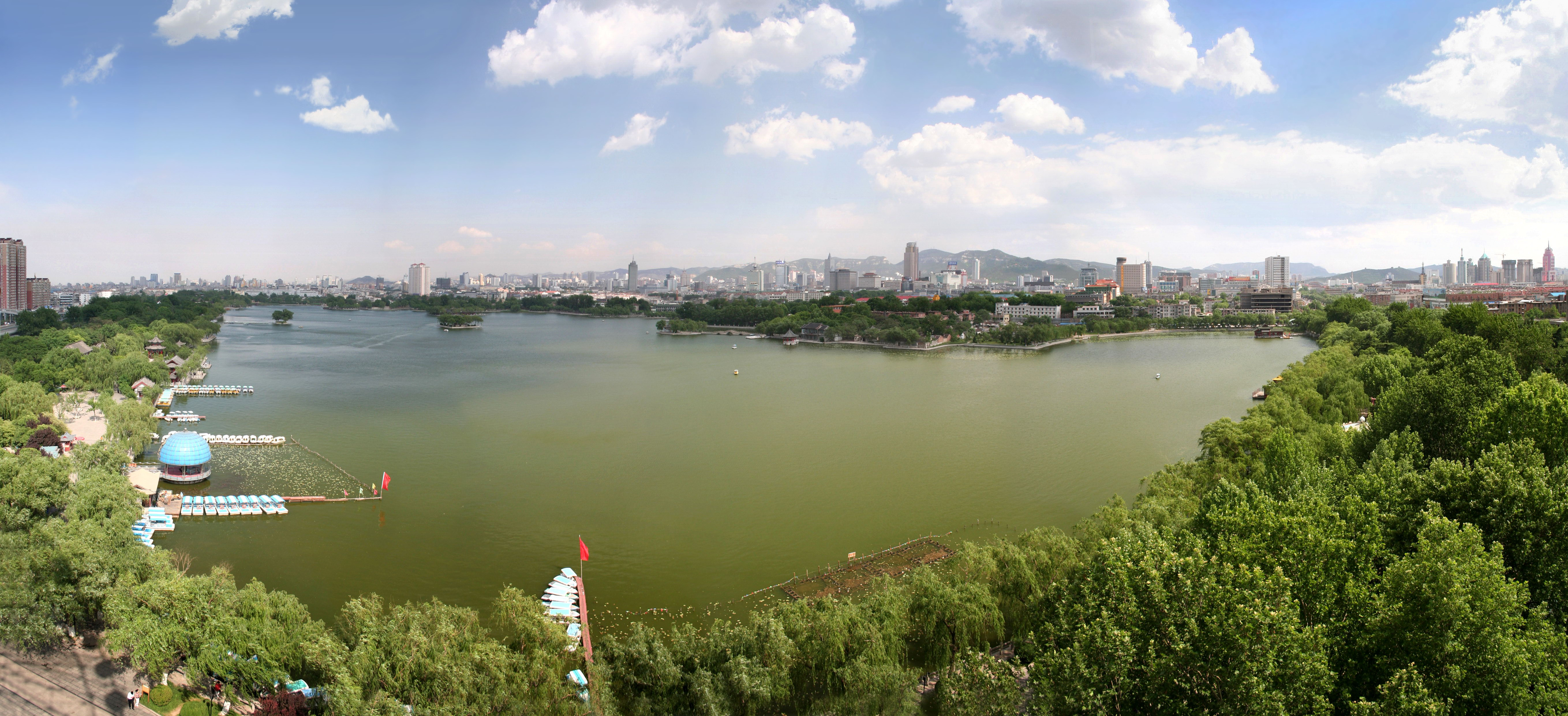
Panorama of Daming Lake

The lake is surrounded by a park with an ensemble of historical buildings, some of which stand on the islands in the lake:

=== Lixia Pavilion ===
The Lixia Pavilion (Chinese: 历下亭; pinyin: Lìxià Tíng) is located on an island off the lake's east shore. The pavilion is said to mark the spot of a meeting between the Tang dynasty poet Du Fu and the calligrapher Li Yong (Chinese: 李邕; pinyin: Li Yōng, 678–747). The pavilion was rebuilt in 1693 and features inscriptions by the Qing-dynasty calligrapher He Shaoji and the Kangxi Emperor.

=== Lake Center Pavilion ===
The Lake Center Pavilion (Chinese: 湖心亭; pinyin: Húxīn Tíng) is set on an island near the lake's center.

=== Moon-lit Pavilion ===
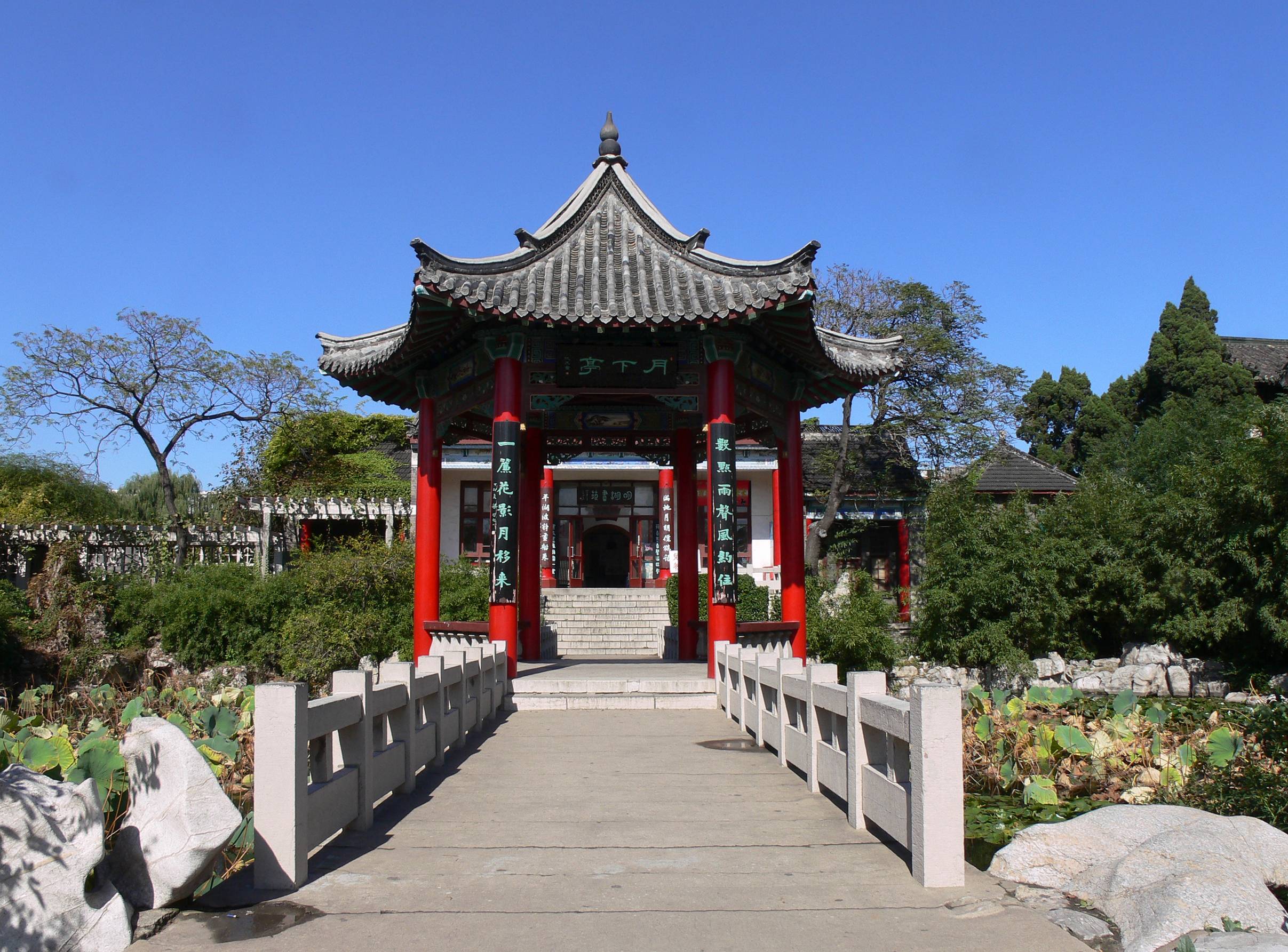
Moon lit Pavilion

The Moon-lit Pavilion (Chinese: 月下亭; pinyin: Yuèxià Tíng; lit. 'Pavilion under the Moon') is located on the north-eastern shore of the lake. It is connected to a large hall via a bridge. Military governor of Shandong and warlord Han Fuju had an emergency escape tunnel constructed that connected the basement of this hall to the outer city. The tunnel was used by Kuomintang general Wang Yaowu to escape from the city at the end of the Battle of Jinan during Chinese Civil War era.

=== Jiuqu Pavilion ===
The Jiuqu Pavilion (Chinese: 九曲亭; pinyin: Jiǔqū Tíng; lit. 'Nine Bend Pavilion') is located on the southwest shore of the Lake.

=== Haoran Pavilion ===
The Haoran Pavilion (Chinese: 浩然亭; pinyin: Hàorán Tíng) stands on the lake's south shore.

=== Ancestral Hall of Lord Tie ===
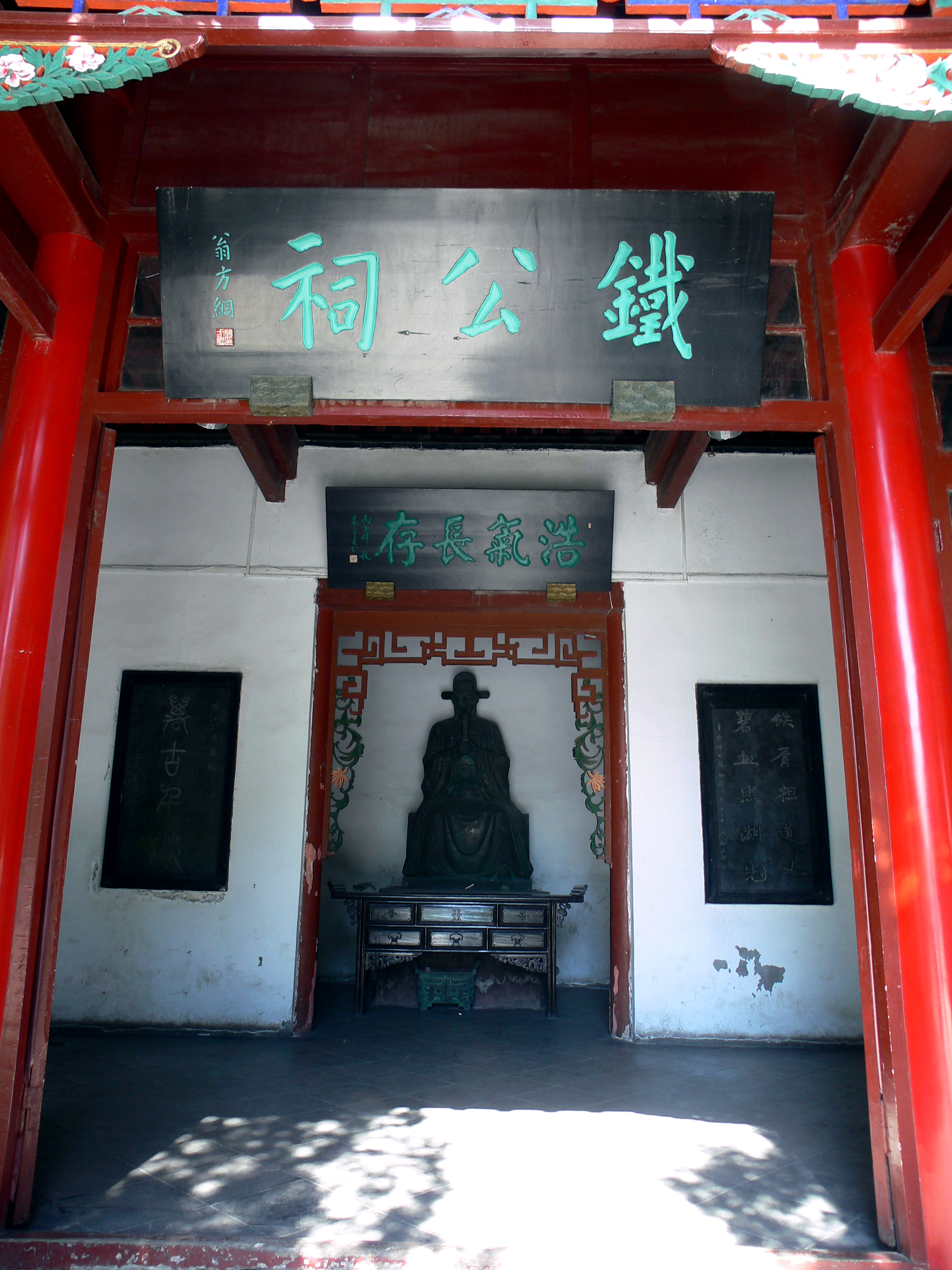
Ancestral Hall of Lord Tie

The Ancestral Hall of Lord Tie (Chinese: 铁公祠; pinyin: Tiěgōng Cí) is located on the northwest shore of the Lake. It is a memorial to Tie Xuan, a Ming-dynasty official during the reign of the Jianwen Emperor. Tie Xuan was renowned for his heroism and loyalty in the defense of the city against the rebelling Prince Zhu Di, the later Yongle Emperor. The memorial hall was erected during the times of the Qing dynasty.

=== Xiaocanglang Pavilion ===
The Xiaocanglang Pavilion (Chinese: 小沧浪亭; pinyin: Xiǎocāngláng Tíng; lit. 'Little Rippling Wave Pavilion') is located on the lake's northwest shore.

=== Huiquan Hall ===
Huiquan Hall (Chinese: 汇泉堂; pinyin: Huìquán Táng; lit. 'Joining of the Springs Hall')

=== Beiji Temple ===
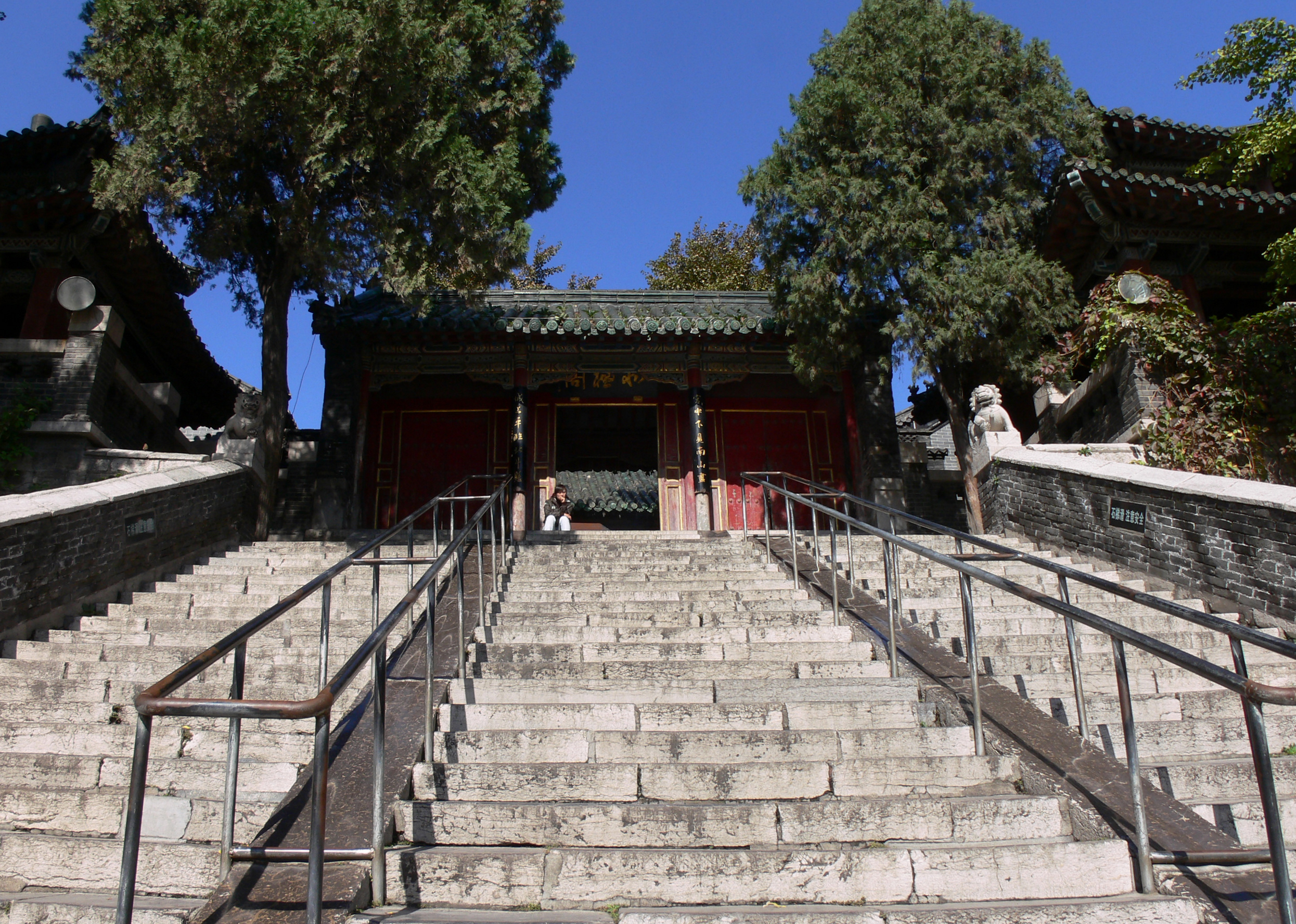
North Pole Temple

Beiji Temple (Chinese: 北极阁; pinyin: Běijí Gé; lit. 'North Pole Temple') is a taoist temple dedicated to Xuan Wu, the god of the North. It was first built in the early Yuan dynasty, but rebuilt during the reign of the Yongle Emperor of the Ming dynasty. Numerous renovations were carried out during the Qing dynasty. The temple contains several halls as well as a bell and a drum tower. It stands on a seven-meter tall base and covers an area of 1,078 square meters.

=== Huibo Building ===
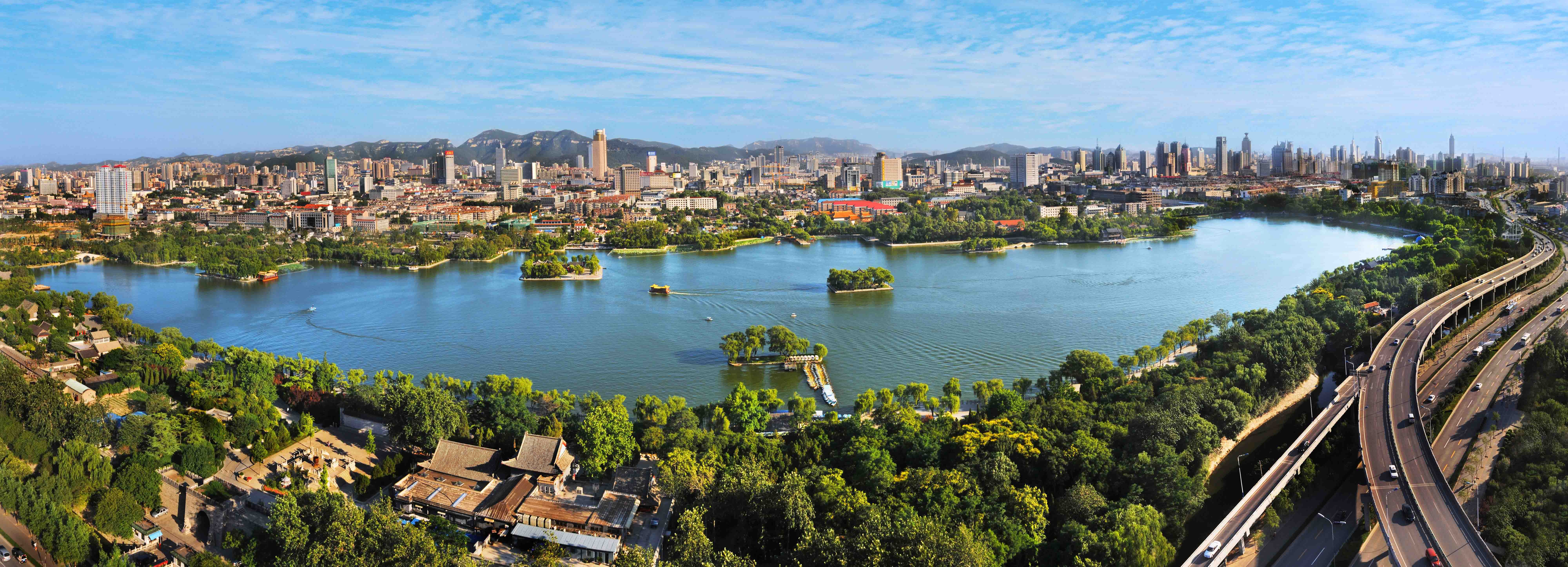
Daming Lake and Jinan skyline

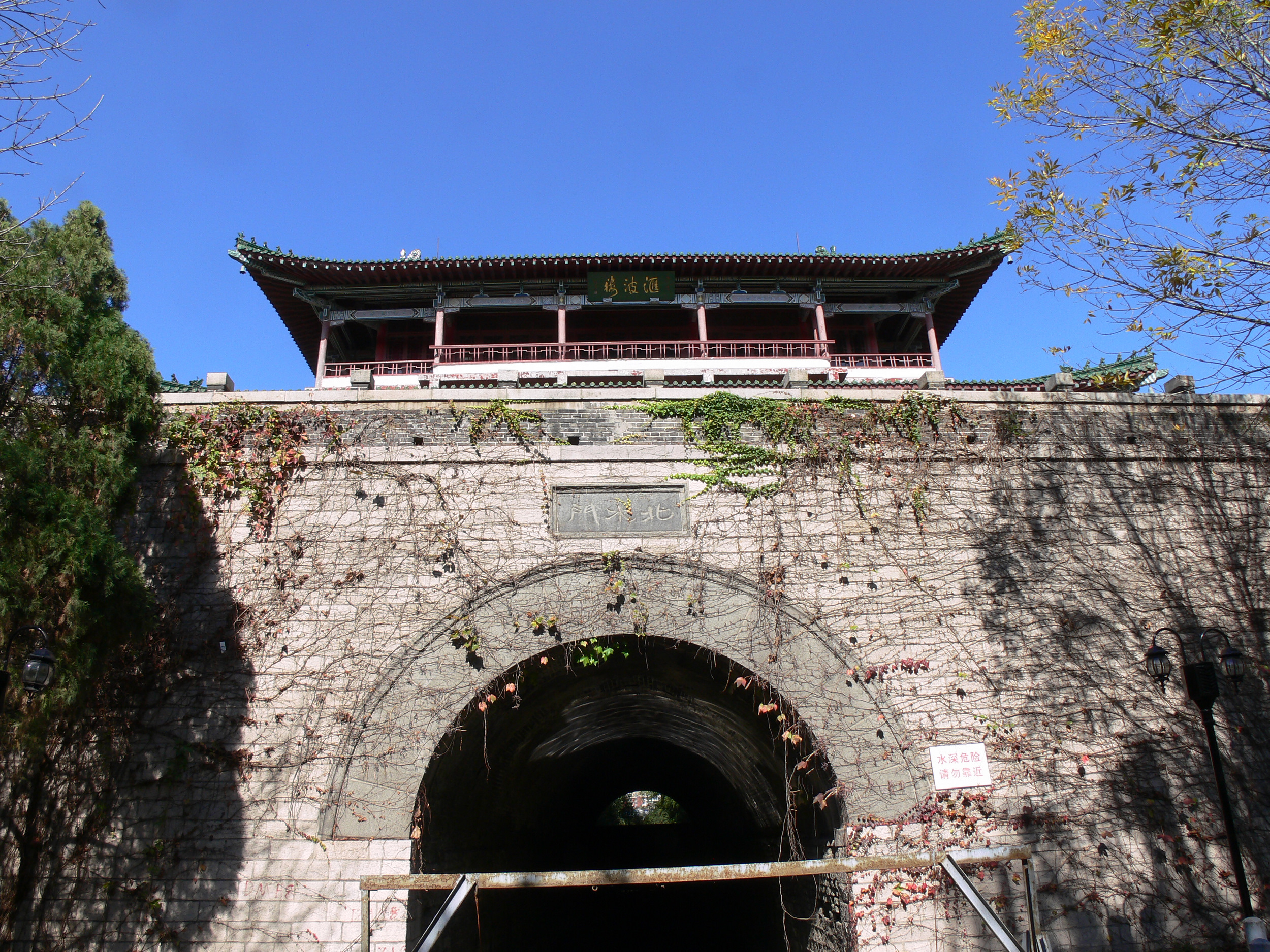
Huibo Building

The Huibo Building (Chinese: 汇波楼; pinyin: Huìbō Lóu; lit. 'Joining of the Waves Building') is located near the east gate of Daming Lake Park. It stands on the site of the watergate that controls the outflow of the Daming Lake into the Xiaoqing River.

=== Nanfeng Ancestral Hall ===
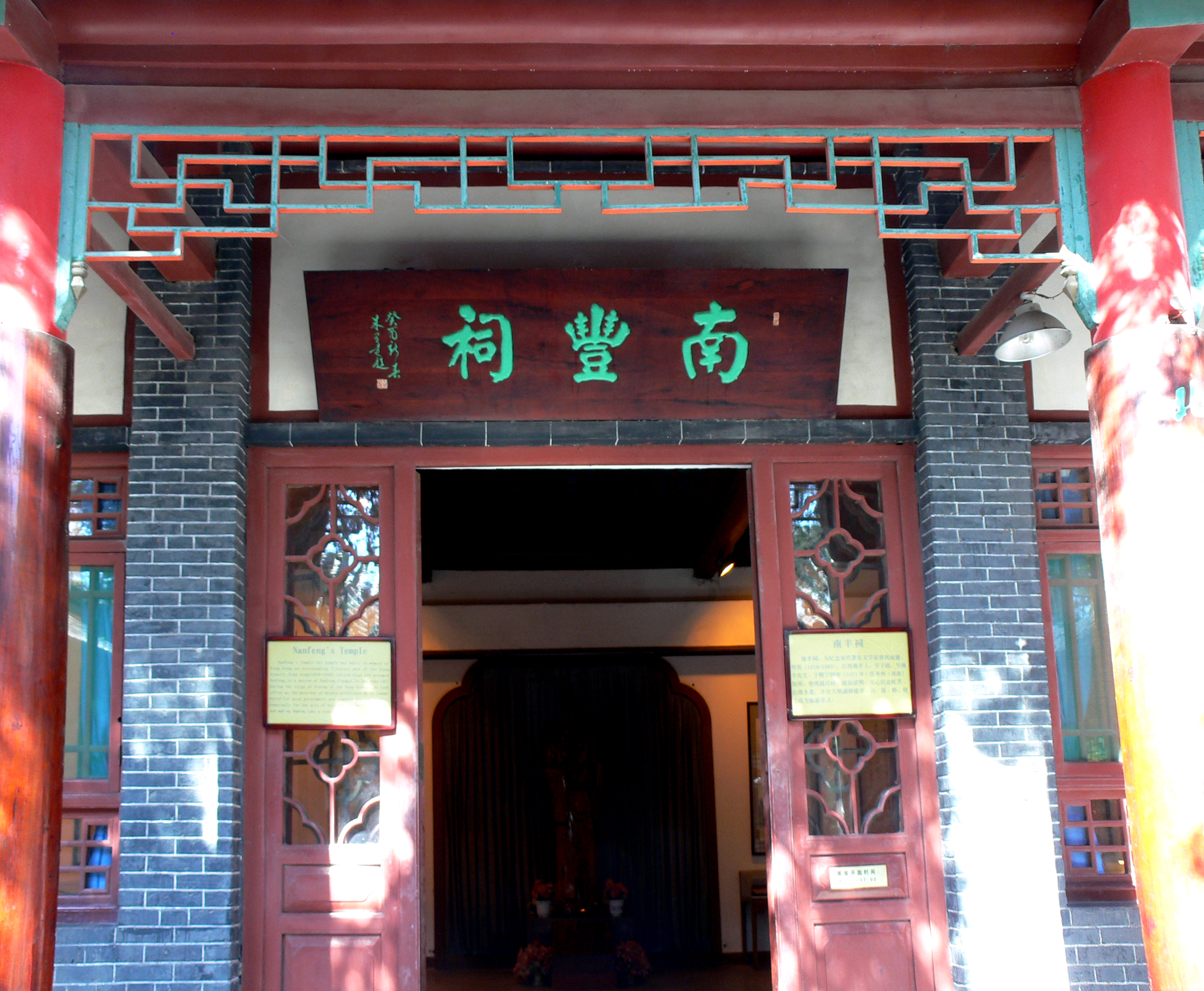
Nanfeng Ancestral Hall

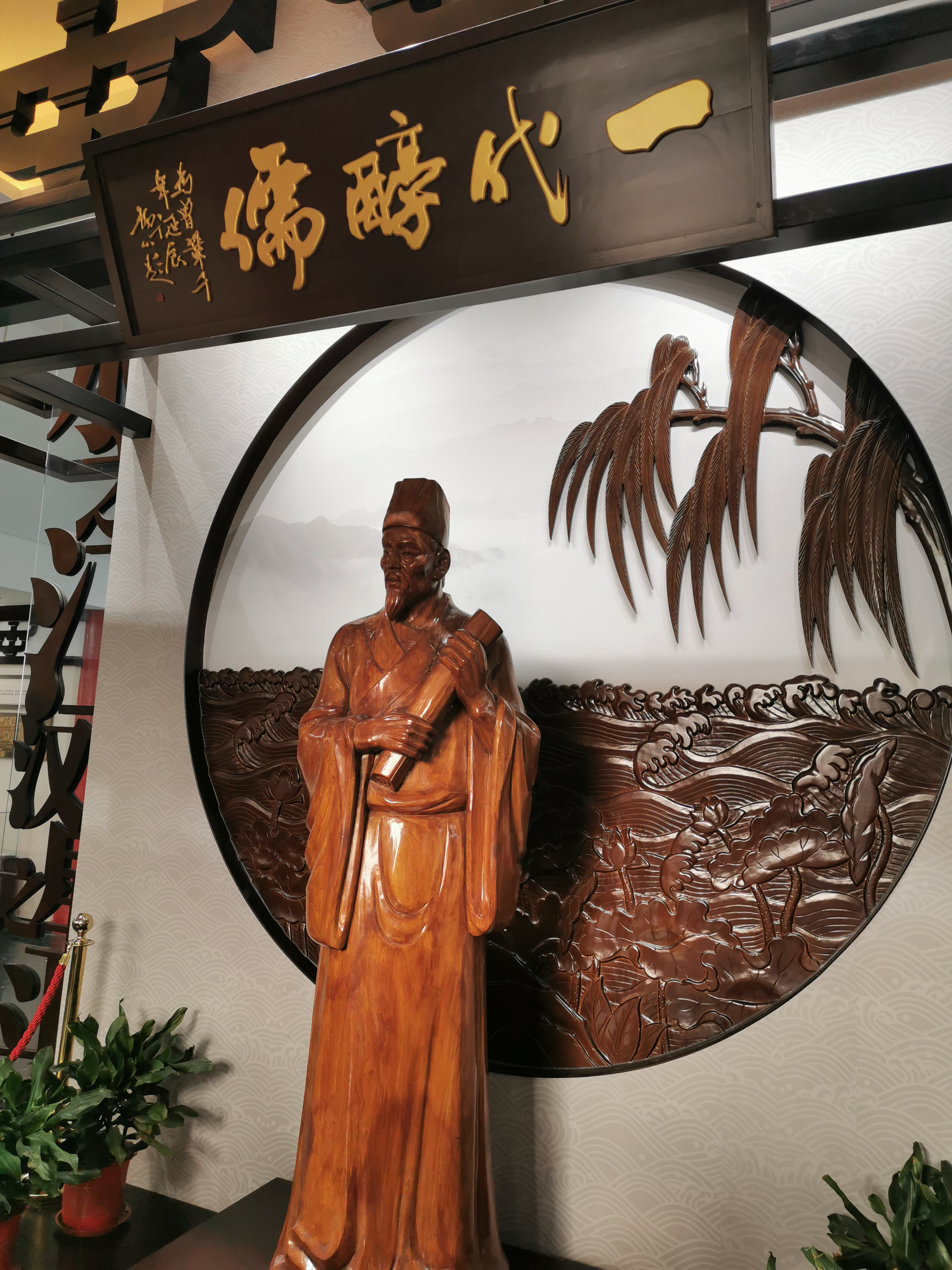
Statue of Zeng Gong

The Nanfeng Ancestral Hall (Chinese: 南丰祠; pinyin: Nánfēng Cí) is a memorial to the Song-dynasty scholar Zeng Gong, who comes from Nanfeng, Jiangxi, and served as the governor of Qi Prefecture from 1071 to 1073. The present structure has been rebuilt in 1829.

=== Jiaxuan Ancestral Hall ===
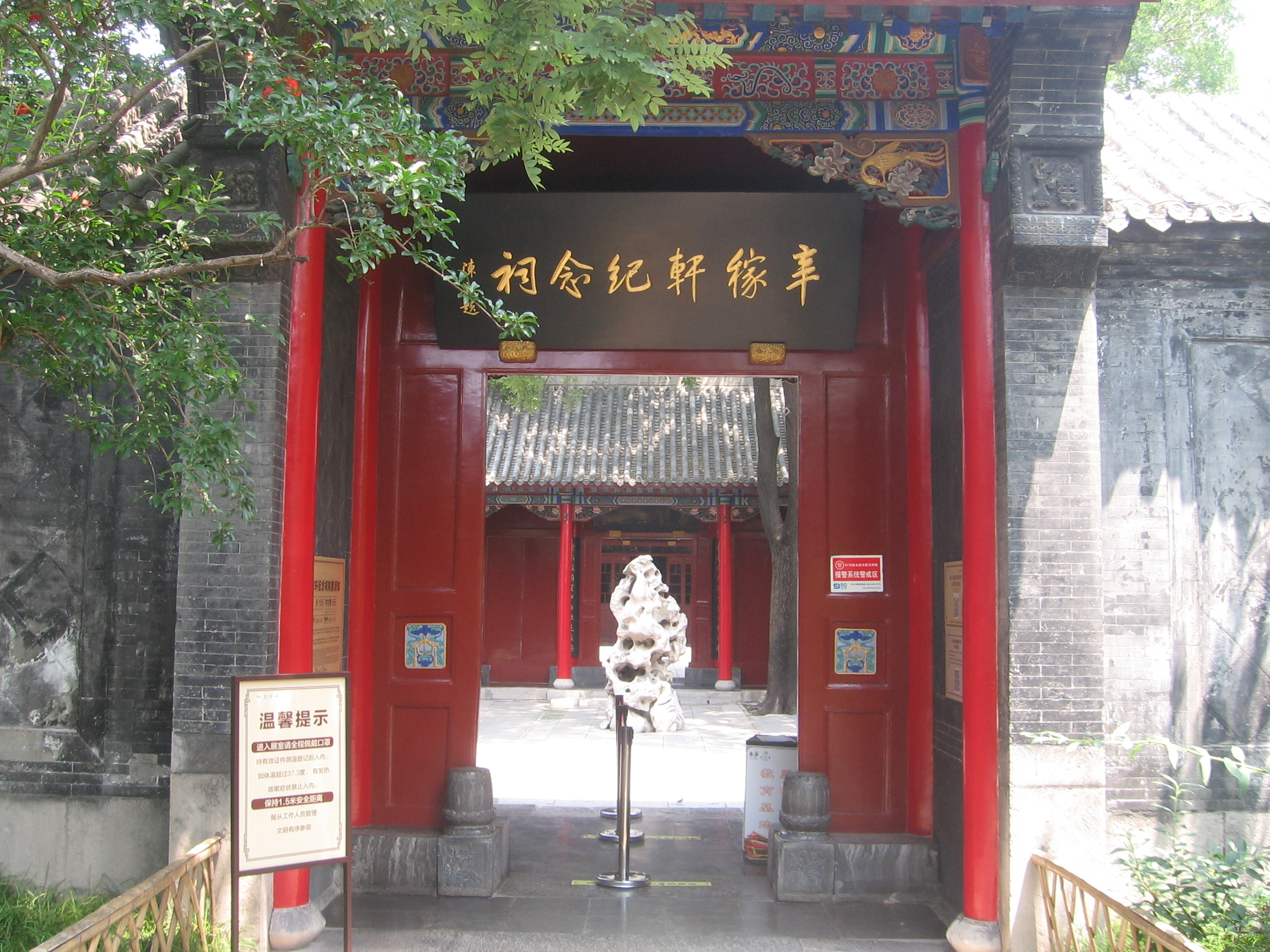
Jiaxuan Ancestral Hall

The Jiaxuan Ancestral Hall (Chinese: 稼轩祠; pinyin: Jiaxuān Cí) commemorates Xin Qiji, a military leader and statesman of the Southern Song dynasty who was born in Jinan. The temple complex cover a total area of 1400 square meters. Converted for other uses during the Republic of China, the temple was restored to its present function in 1961.

=== Oushen's Temple ===
Oushen's Temple (Chinese: 藕神祠; pinyin: Ǒushén Cí) is a memorial temple that was originally dedicated to the Goddess of the Lotus Root. During the Qing dynasty it was rededicated to the memory of Li Qingzhao, a famous female poet during Southern Song period.

=== Daming Lake Nanfeng Theater ===
The Daming Lake Nanfeng Theater (Chinese: 大明湖南丰戏楼; pinyin: Dàmíng Hú Nánfēng Xìlóu) is located in the courtyard of the Nanfeng Ancestral Hall and was constructed during the late Qing dynasty.

== Gardens ==
The park that surrounds Daming Lake features six traditional Chinese gardens:

=== Xia Garden ===
The Xia Garden (Chinese: 遐园; pinyin: Xiá Yuán) is a traditional courtyard garden that is located to the south of the lake and covers an area of about 9600 square meters. The garden dates back to the year 1909 and was formerly part of the Shandong Provincial Library.

=== Jiaxuan Garden ===
(Chinese: 稼轩园; pinyin: Jiaxuān Yuán)

=== Qiuliu Garden ===
(Chinese: 秋柳园; pinyin: Qiūliǔ Yuán)

=== Huju Garden ===
(Chinese: 湖居园; pinyin: Hújū Yuán; lit. 'Lake Residence Garden')

=== Nanfeng Garden ===
(Chinese: 南丰园; pinyin: Nánfēng Yuán)

=== Qishi Guanyu Garden ===
(Chinese: 奇石观鱼园; pinyin: Qíshí Guānyú Yuán).

== History ==
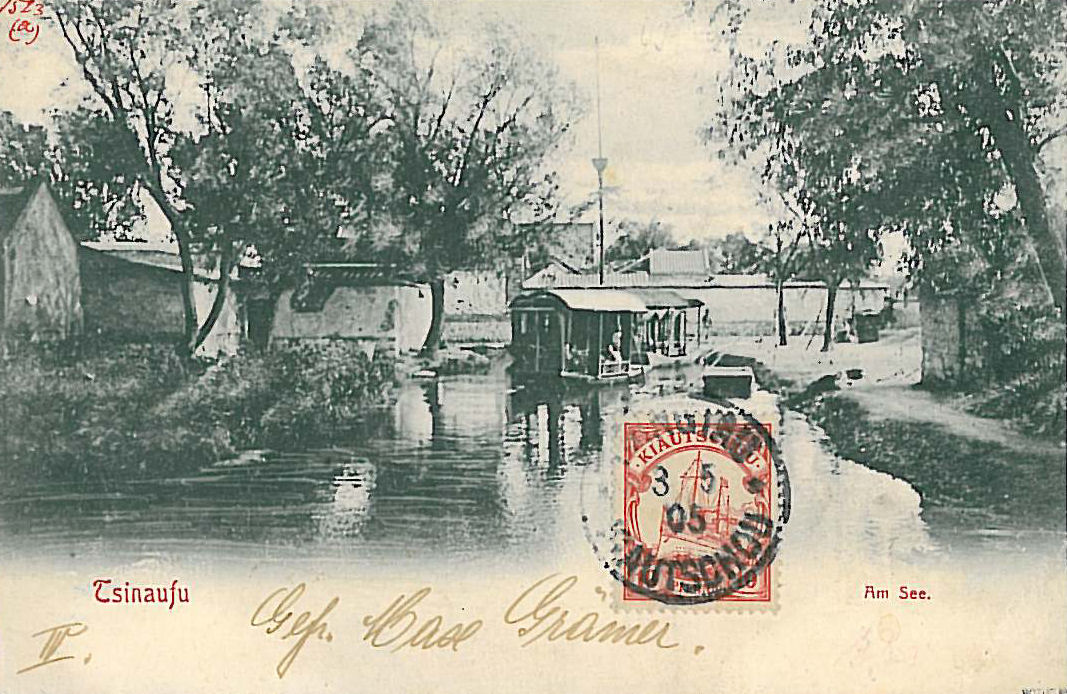
Photo of Daming Lake from an early 20th-century German postcard

As a central site in the historical center of Jinan, Daming Lake has been the setting of many events in the history of the city: As his rebellion against the Mongol ruler Kublai Khan came to an end in 1262, the governor Li Tan tried to drown himself in the lake. He was rescued by the Mongols in order to be executed by being put in a sack and trampled to death by horses. The warlord Zhang Zongchang, nicknamed the "Dogmeat General" and unpopular because of his heavy-handed rule, planned to erect a living shrine to himself on the lake, but the plans were not executed due to Zhang's fall from power. During the Battle of Jinan in the Chinese Civil War, the commander of the city's defense against the communist People's Liberation Army, Kuomintang General Wang Yaowu had his command post near the lake shore.

From March 2006 to April 2007, the Daming Lake Park was renovated and extended to connect all portions of the park for unified access. To achieve this, 1788 housing units (including 1639 residential units) were demolished. Since the expansion, the Daming Lake Park covers a total of 103.4 hectares, 29.4 hectares (land: 20 hectares, lake 29.4 hectares) of which were added in the expansion.

== Literature ==
The scenery of Daming Lake has been a topic of Chinese literature for at least about 1,500 years. The lake is mentioned in "Commentary on the Waterways Classic" (Chinese: 水经注; pinyin: Shui Jīng Zhù) by Northern Wei dynasty writer and geographer Li Daoyuan (died 527). It is described in "A Trip to Jinan" by the Jin dynasty poet Yuan Haowen (1235) and was also described by Marco Polo a bit later. The scenery of Daming Lake is also featured in the novel "The Travels of Lao Can" by Liu E and the essay "The Winter of Jinan" (Chinese: 济南的冬天; pinyin: Jǐnán de Dōngtiān) by Lao She. Daming Lake is also the subject of a poem by Zhang Zongchang, military governor of Shandong from 1920 to 1928, that has been frequently quoted to ridicule him:

大明湖 明湖大
Dàmíng hú míng hú dà
The Daming ("Daming" means "big brightness") Lake, the bright lake is big
大明湖里有荷花
Dàmíng hú lǐ yǒu hé huā
In the Daming Lake are lotus flowers
荷花上头有蛤蟆
Hé huā shàng tóu yŏu há má
On the lotuses are toads
一戳一蹦达
Yī chuō yī bèng dá
[You] prick them once, [the toads] leap once

== Visitors ==
Because of its cultural significance, the Daming Lake has attracted visits by artists, scholars, and political figures over the centuries. Recorded visitors include:

=== Tang dynasty ===
- Li Yong, calligrapher
- Du Fu, poet
- Duan Chengshi, scholar

=== Song dynasty ===
- Zeng Gong, Su Zhe, Chao Buzhi, writers
- Li Qingzhao and Xin Qiji, poets

=== Jin dynasty ===
- Yuan Haowen, poet and writer

=== Yuan dynasty ===
- Zhao Mengfu, painter
- Zhang Yanghao, poet

=== Ming dynasty ===
- Tie Xuan, provincial official, honored in the Lord Tie Ancestral Hall
- Bian Gong and Li Panlong, scholars

=== Qing dynasty ===
- Zhu Yizun and Ruan Yuan, scholars
- Wang Shizhen, poet
- Gao Fenghan, painter
- Jiang Shiquan, playwright
- He Shaoji, calligrapher
- Pu Songling and Liu E, novelists

=== Modern China ===
- Guo Moruo and Lao She, writers
- Mao Zedong (in 1958) and Zhou Enlai (in 1959), politicians

== Location ==
Daming Lake is located to the north of Minghu Road and to the south of the old city moat. The park is accessible through 4 gates, the north gate, the east gate, the main gate in the south, and the southwest gate.

== See also ==
- List of sites in Jinan
