= Battle of Weixian =

1948 battle of the Chinese Civil War

- Part of Chinese Civil War
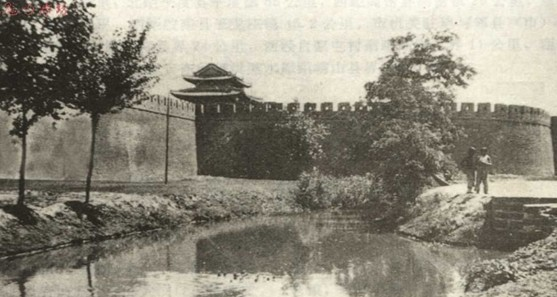
- The old city walls of Weixian (now part of Weifang City), Shandong Province
| Date | April 2, 1948 – May 8, 1948 (1 month and 6 days) |
| Location | Shandong Province, Weixian and surrounding areas |
| Result | Victory for the People's Liberation Army; capture of Weixian |

Belligerents
| Republic of China; National Revolutionary Army 96th Army, Reorganized 45th Division, 12 local security regiments | East China Field Army Shandong Corps, local forces of Jiaodong and Bohai military regions |

Commanders and leaders
| Wang Yaowu Theater Commander; Chen Jincheng Commander of the 96th Army; Zhang Tianzuo Leader of the security regiments | Xu Shiyou Commander; Tan Zhenlin Political Commissar; Nie Fengzhi Leader of the main assault forces |

Strength
| Approximately 47,000 troops | Approximately 120,000 troops |

Casualties and losses
| 19,000 casualties 26,000 captured | 1,432 killed 6,548 wounded |

Battle of Weixian (also known as the Battle of the Central Section of the Jiaoji Railway) was a military campaign during the Chinese Civil War in which the People's Liberation Army (PLA) East China Field Army Shandong Corps, under the command of Xu Shiyou, launched an offensive to capture the city of Weixian in Shandong Province, held by the National Revolutionary Army (NRA). The battle lasted from April 2 to May 8, 1948, and was the first major siege undertaken by the East China Field Army after its formation. Weixian was a significant commercial and industrial hub in Shandong and an important transportation node between Jinan and Qingdao, making it a key defensive point for the Nationalist forces on the Jiaoji Railway, known as the "Bastion of Central Shandong." The battle ended with the PLA capturing Weixian and surrounding areas. The PLA suffered approximately 8,000 casualties, while the NRA lost over 45,000 troops, including the capture of 6 high-ranking officers, such as the commander of the 96th Army and Reorganized 45th Division, Chen Jincheng.

== Background ==
After the Battle of Menglianggu in May 1947, the National Revolutionary Army (NRA) shifted from strategic offense to defense on the East China front, while the PLA began its counteroffensive. On August 6 of the same year, the Chinese Communist military command decided to split the East China Field Army into two groups: the "Western Corps" (also known as the external corps), consisting of 7 main divisions led by Su Yu, was tasked with launching external offensives, while the "Eastern Corps" (also known as the internal corps or Shandong Corps), consisting of 3 divisions and local forces from Jiaodong, was commanded by Xu Shiyou and remained for internal operations in the Shandong Peninsula. On August 18, the NRA command responded by creating the "Jiaodong Corps," under the command of Fan Hanjie, aimed at taking advantage of the PLA's weakened presence in Jiaodong following the western advance to sever the maritime links between the liberated areas of Northeast China, North China, and Shandong. Thus, the Jiaodong theater became a contest between Xu Shiyou and Fan Hanjie.

Between August 1947 and March 1948, during the battles of the "Jiaohe Campaign" and the "Western Jiaoji Railway Campaign," Xu Shiyou exploited the disunity and internal factionalism within the NRA to gain the upper hand through maneuver warfare, capturing much of the western section of the Jiaoji Railway and towns such as Laiyang and Zibo. As a result, the PLA gained strategic dominance in the Jiaodong theater. After Fan Hanjie was transferred out of Shandong, command of the Jiaodong front fell to Wang Yaowu, Chairman of Shandong Province for the Nationalist Government. By March 1948, only three cities along the Jiaoji Railway—Jinan, Qingdao, and Weixian—remained under Nationalist control.

== Deployment ==
=== Nationalist Forces ===
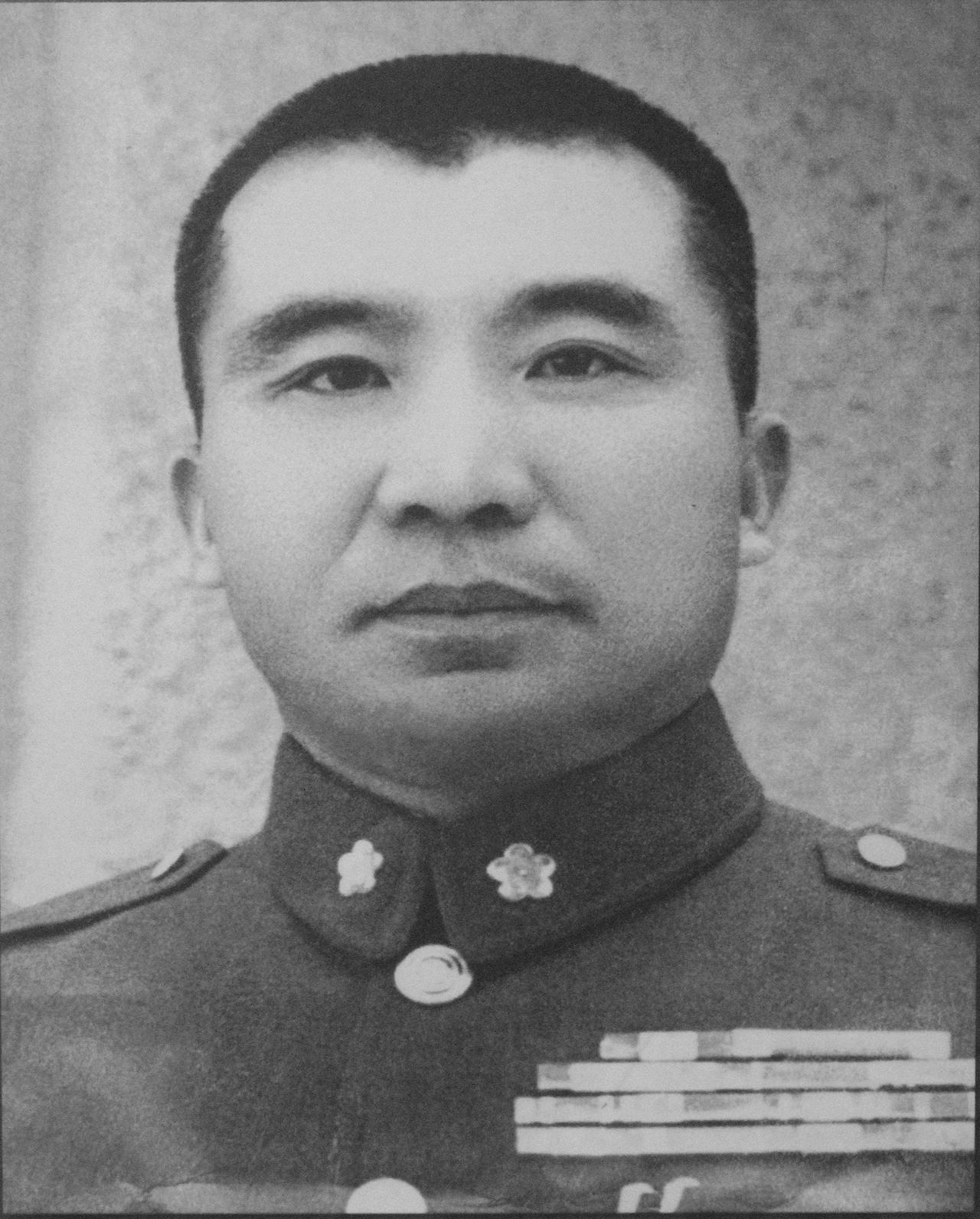
Commander of the Nationalist forces in the Weixian Battle and Second Pacification District, Wang Yaowu

The town of Weixian was located at the central section of the Jiaoji Railway, consisting of two separate walled cities, the larger western city and the smaller eastern city, separated by the Bailang River. These two cities were connected by five stone bridges. According to local records, Weixian had never been successfully captured in battle prior to this campaign. The town was considered a major stronghold and was dubbed the "Bastion of Central Shandong." The Nationalist forces defending Weixian consisted of the Reorganized 45th Division, 12 local security regiments, and various landlord militia, amounting to approximately 47,000 troops, with overall command entrusted to Chen Jincheng, commander of the 96th Army and Reorganized 45th Division. The 45th Division was a well-equipped regular army unit, including artillery, while the local security regiments and militia, though less equipped, still provided some combat effectiveness. Additionally, the Nationalist forces were supported by the Republic of China Air Force. In late March 1948, following consultations at the Weixian airfield with Chen Jincheng, Second Pacification District Commander Wang Yaowu decided to adopt a strategy of "concentrating forces and holding strongpoints, awaiting reinforcements" to defend Weixian. To this end, a fortified system with three lines of defense centered on the western city was built, including an extensive network of blockhouses, barbed wire, mines, and other fortifications. Tens of thousands of civilians were mobilized daily to fortify the defenses. Chen Jincheng confidently proclaimed, "Weixian is an impregnable fortress. It's impossible for the PLA to breach it!"

=== PLA Perspective ===
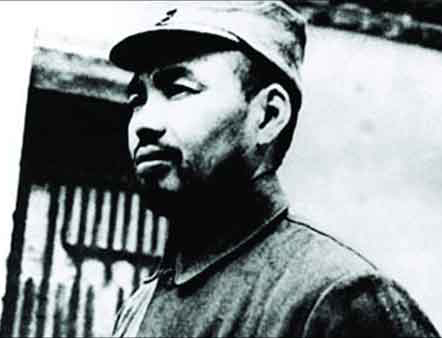
Xu Shiyou, Commander of the PLA in the Weixian Campaign and leader of the East China Field Army's Shandong Corps

After the Shandong Corps captured most of the areas along the Jiaoji Railway, there was disagreement among the commanders regarding the next strategic step. Some suggested directly attacking Jinan, but Xu Shiyou believed the timing was not ideal as the Nationalist forces were already prepared. Meanwhile, Weixian had become an isolated city after the battles in the western section of the Jiaoji Railway. It was situated between the Central Shandong Liberated Area and the Bohai Liberated Area, making it convenient for attacks and logistical support. Hence, Xu strongly advocated attacking Weixian first.

After thorough discussions, the PLA developed a detailed battle plan to address the strong defenses of Weixian. The plan divided the campaign into two phases: first, clearing out Nationalist forces in the Changle area to secure the outskirts of Weixian; and second, concentrating troops and firepower to capture Weixian itself.

In terms of troop deployment: - The Bohai Column and local forces from the Central Shandong Military Region were tasked with attacking Weixian's outskirts, focusing on capturing key targets near Weixian, including the Ershilibao railway station, the power plant, and the airport, thereby cutting off the connection between Fangzi and Weicheng and severing the Nationalist forces' air and land links. - The Ninth Column and Bohai Column were assigned to assault Weixian directly. - The Seventh Column, Bohai New 13th Division, and other units were to block potential reinforcements from Jinan. - The 39th Division of the 13th Column, along with local forces from the Jiaodong Military Region, was to block reinforcements possibly coming from Qingdao. - The 38th Division of the 13th Column served as the general reserve force.

In terms of tactics, the PLA emphasized "steady and methodical" attacks, utilizing tunnel operations to approach and capture Nationalist defensive positions, thereby minimizing casualties. Once the outskirts were cleared, the plan was to concentrate troops and artillery to first capture the western city and seize the enemy’s command center, and then launch an assault on the eastern city. For logistics, the PLA mobilized a total of 135,000 civilian laborers and over 5,000 stretchers. Residents of the liberated areas also provided the army with significant quantities of grain, fodder, and other supplies. In total, the PLA committed 54 regiments, with over 120,000 troops participating in this campaign.

== Course of the Battle ==
=== Outskirts Combat ===
On April 1, the PLA surrounded Weixian. The next day, Bohai Column and forces from the Central Shandong Military Region advanced from three directions toward Changle County, cutting off the route between Changle and Weixian. Simultaneously, the Ninth Column moved eastward from the Changshan area, and the Thirteenth Column advanced from the Jiaodong Peninsula. By April 5, all participating PLA units had reached their designated positions.

On April 8, the PLA launched attacks from the southern outskirts, the southern city, and the northern city. Troops from the Jiaodong Military Region first targeted the railway station and airport in the southern city. By 4 p.m. on the following day, the airport was captured, severing the Nationalist forces’ air supply lines and forcing them to rely on airdrops for supplies. After securing the airport, the PLA captured two railway stations and a power plant in Weixian by April 12, completing the plan for the southern outskirts.

In the northern city, the PLA began its assault on the evening of April 8. Artillery units targeted the heavily defended "Beigong" and "Beiguan" positions, and nighttime trench digging brought PLA positions within 100 meters of Nationalist defenses. This tactic reduced the advantage of Nationalist airpower and artillery. On April 10, the 26th Division of the Ninth Column attacked Beigong. Initial frontal assaults were repelled due to the dense fortifications. The next day, the 26th Division flanked and captured Beigong from the rear. Subsequently, the PLA advanced to Beiguan and captured it on April 14, achieving their northern sector objectives.

Meanwhile, in the southern city, Bohai and Central Shandong forces took ten days to capture Nanguan on April 18. During this time, Chiang Kai-shek personally wired General Chen Jincheng in Weixian, promising reinforcements and commending his determination to defend the city.

=== Battle for the Western City ===
After completing the outskirts operations, the PLA paused for three days to adjust deployments and dig further trenches while feigning withdrawal to mislead the Nationalist forces. Mistakenly believing the PLA had suffered heavy casualties and retreated, the Nationalist commander Wang Yaowu held a celebration in Jinan to commemorate the "victory in Weixian." The Nationalist newspaper *Central Daily* reported, "Communist Forces Retreat, Weixian Relieved."

On April 22, the Shandong Corps ordered a general assault on the western city. At 6 p.m. on April 23, the Ninth Column and Bohai Column launched a coordinated attack. Continuous artillery and demolition operations severely damaged the outer bunkers and breached the city wall. The 27th Division of the Ninth Column captured three entry points into the western city.

On April 24, the Ninth Column concentrated its forces and artillery on the northern ramparts, creating additional breaches. Although Nationalist forces mounted strong resistance, the PLA deployed reinforcements under heavy artillery cover. By 1 p.m., the 25th Division had breached the wall, and subsequent units joined the offensive. A final assault at 11 p.m. secured the western city.

=== Battle for the Eastern City and Surrounding Areas ===
On April 26, at 6 p.m., PLA artillery began a 90-minute bombardment of the eastern city, targeting walls and key areas near the Bailang River. By 8:20 p.m., the 87th Regiment of the Ninth Column had breached the city wall and entered the eastern city. By dawn on April 27, the PLA controlled one-third of the area. Nationalist commanders Chen Jincheng and Zhang Tianzuo attempted to break out but were intercepted by PLA ambushes. Chen was captured, and Zhang was killed.

By noon on April 27, the eastern city was fully under PLA control, marking the end of the siege of Weixian. In the aftermath, PLA forces captured nearby areas such as Anqiu, Changle, and Tianma. Nationalist troops in these regions, demoralized by the fall of Weixian, either retreated or surrendered.

By May 8, all Nationalist reinforcements from Qingdao and Jinan had withdrawn, marking the conclusion of the Weixian Campaign.

== Results and Aftermath ==
=== Battle Statistics ===
During this battle, the PLA suffered approximately 8,000 casualties, including 1,432 killed and 6,548 wounded. The PLA captured three towns—Weixian, Changle, and Anqiu—along with 4,000 square kilometers of surrounding territory. They seized significant materials, including 181 artillery pieces, over 17,000 firearms, more than 38,000 shells, approximately 115,000 grenades, over 260,000 bullets, as well as airplanes, locomotives, automobiles, and other resources. The Nationalist forces incurred around 45,000 losses, including over 19,000 killed or wounded and more than 26,000 captured. Among the captives were six general-level officers, including the commander of the 96th Army and the reorganized 45th Division, Chen Jincheng, as well as 127 field-grade officers. Notable casualties included Zhang Tianzuo, commander of the Eighth Security District of Shandong, and his deputy, Zhang Rannong.

=== Subsequent Developments ===
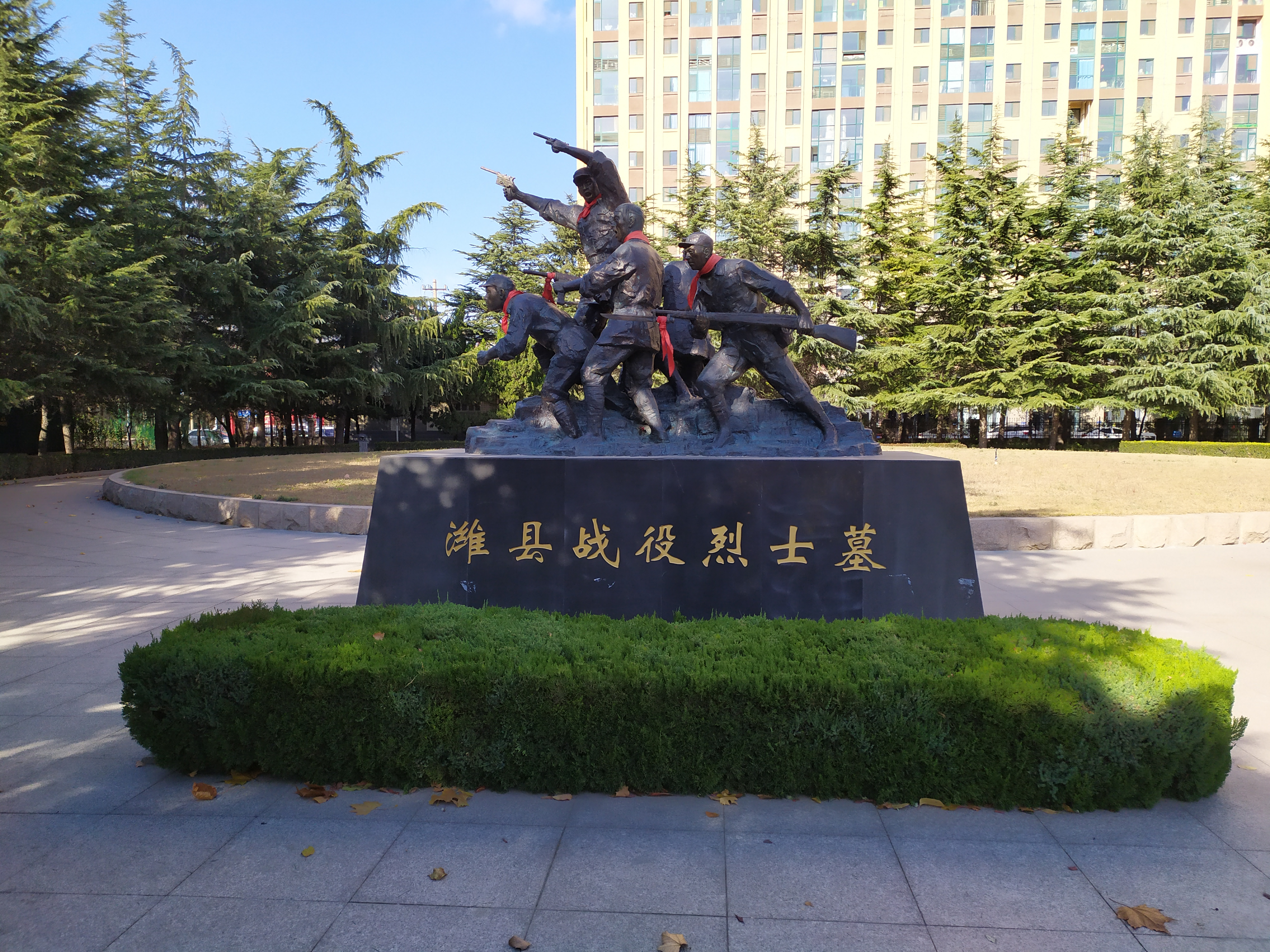
The Weixian Campaign Martyrs’ Tomb at the Weifang Revolutionary Martyrs' Cemetery

The Weixian Campaign marked the first urban assault conducted by the East China Field Army during the Chinese Civil War. After the battle, the Shandong Corps took a brief period to regroup before shifting its focus to the Jinpu Railway and launching the Yanzhou Campaign. The Shandong Corps also gained valuable experience in urban combat, later applying these tactics successfully in the Battle of Jinan and the Huaihai Campaign. For the Nationalist forces, the fall of Weixian, a "fortress in central Shandong," connected the three liberated zones in the province, further isolating the Nationalist strategic strongholds of Jinan and Qingdao.

After capturing Weixian, the East China Field Army established the Weifang Special Municipal Government to manage the newly liberated city. Subsequently, the Weifang Municipal Government built the "Weixian Campaign Victory Memorial Square". In April 2013, residents of Weifang, together with veterans who participated in the campaign, organized events to commemorate the 65th anniversary of this historically significant battle.

== See also ==
- Battle of Yanzhou, Battle of Jinan, Battle of Nianzhuang
