= Wang Yaowu =

Chinese general (1904–1968)

Wang Yaowu 王耀武
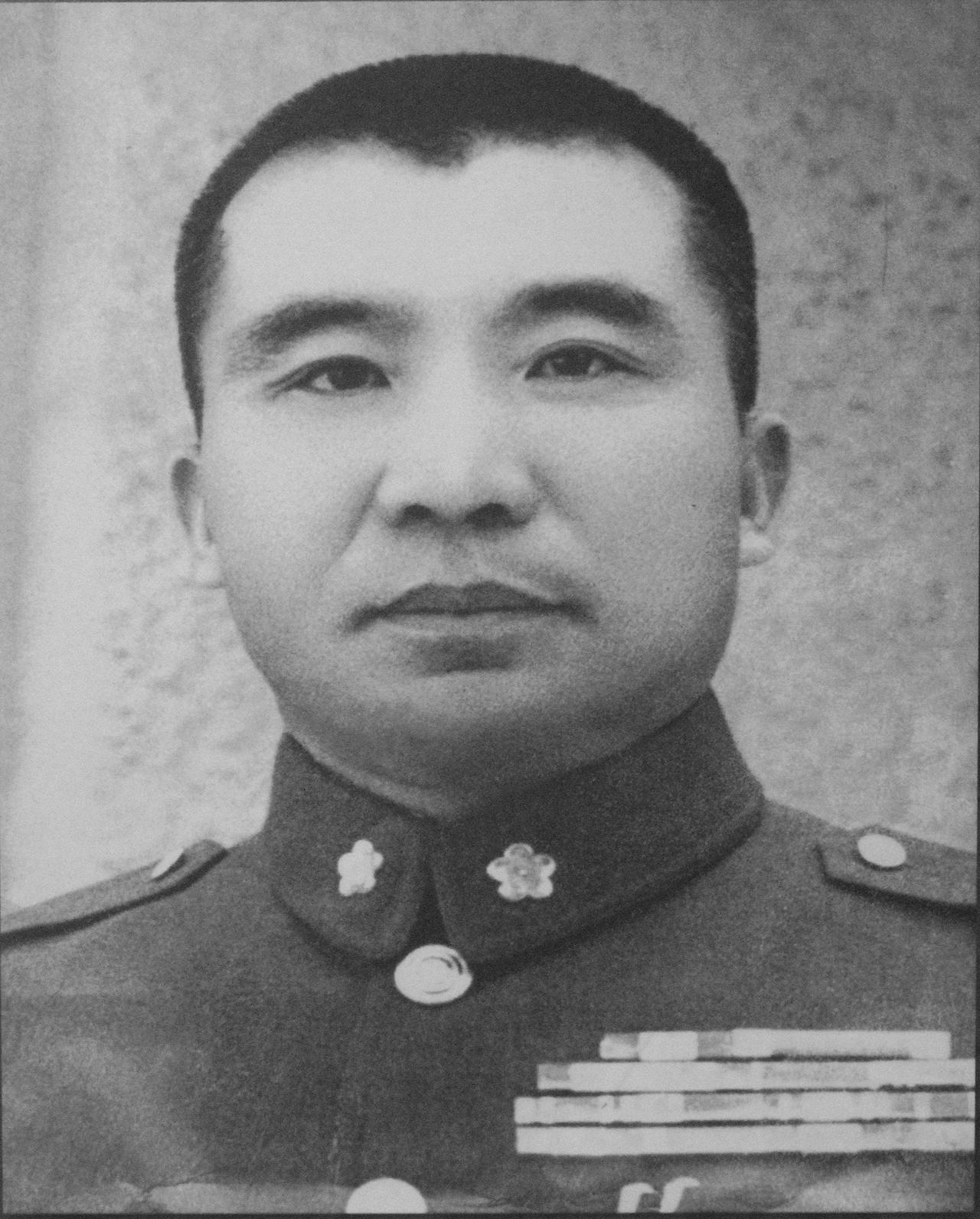
- General Wang Yaowu
- Born: 17 January 1904; Daiyue, Tai'an, Shandong, China
- Died: 3 July 1968 (aged 64); Beijing, China
- Military career
- Allegiance: Republic of China
- Service years: 1924–1948
- Rank: General
- Unit: First division
- Commands: 74th corps, 2nd pacification zone, fourth area army
- Conflicts: Northern Expedition; Encirclement Campaigns; Central Plains War; Second World War; Battle of Wanjialing; Battle of Changsha; Battle of Shanggao; Battle of West Hubei; Battle of Changde; Battle of West Hunan; Chinese Civil War; Battle of Weixian; Battle of Jinan
- Awards: Order of Blue Sky and White Sun
- Other work: politician, author, businessman

Wang Yaowu (Chinese: 王耀武; pinyin: Wáng Yàowǔ, 17 January 1904 – 3 July 1968) was a high-ranking Kuomintang general and Governor of Shandong Province who successfully defeated the Japanese and the Chinese Communists. In September 1948, Communist forces launched the Battle of Jinan. Wang was captured and held as a prisoner of war until his pardon and release in 1959. During the Cultural Revolution he came under attack by the Red Guards for being a former nationalist commander and died of a heart attack in 1968.

== Early life and career ==
Wang was born into peasant family in Shandong province. He lost his father and elder brother when he was young, and his mother raised him into adulthood. When Sun Yat-Sen opened the Whampoa Military Academy, Wang was working as a shop keeper. He immediately borrowed money from his employer and traveled to the South to join the national revolution. Some of his notable classmates included Du Yuming, Fan Hanjie, Hu Lien, Liu Yujian, Guan Linzheng and Lin Biao. After his graduation he joined the Northern Expedition under Generalissimo Chiang Kai-shek against the northern warlords. After Chiang purged the communists in Shanghai on April 12, 1927, he stayed with the Kuomintang as a regiment commander in the National Revolutionary Army. In 1930 he fought in the Central Plains War as a colonel in the central army against an anti-central government coalition under Yan Xishan, Feng Yuxiang and Li Zongren. In 1932, he was received by Chiang Kai-shek after successfully defend his position under communist attacks during the Fourth Encirclement Campaign against Jiangxi Soviet. He was promoted to brigade commander and later as commander of the 51st division. Two years later he participated the Fifth Encirclement Campaign against Jiangxi Soviet and captured Chinese communist leader Fang Zhimin and killing another red army commander in battle around September 1934. In 1935 he scored yet another victory at Jiangxi province by capturing the entire officer corps of the Red Army's 10th corps and was promoted to major general.

== Second Sino-Japanese War ==
In 1937, Wang led his unit in the Battle of Shanghai. His regiment commander was Zhang Lingfu, whom he had just bailed out of prison. In late November, the Chinese army lost the battle for Shanghai and the Japanese Central China Area Army under General Iwane Matsui advanced toward Nanjing. During the Battle of Nanjing, Wang's 51st division suffered heavy casualties and his superior General Tang Shengzhi fled the city without even notifying him and the other senior commanders. Wang barely escaped the city and only 3,000 troops under his command managed to breakout from the Japanese onslaught. In 1938 he took part in the Battle of Lanfeng to fight against the Japanese 14th Division (Imperial Japanese Army) led by General Kenji Doihara, one of the masterminds of the Manchurian Incident. The failure to hold off the Japanese attacks also led the nationalist government open dykes on the Yellow River, causing the 1938 Yellow River flood. During the Battle of Wanjialing, Wang's unit fought against the Japanese attempts to break out from the Chinese encirclement, in which the 106th Division (Imperial Japanese Army) under Lieutenant General Junrokurō Matsuura was almost wiped out. In 1939, Wang led his unit to participate in the Battle of Nanchang, but Chinese forces failed to hold the city. Wang, however, distinguished himself during the Battle of Changsha and was promoted to the command of the 74th corps. Under his command, the 74th corps became one of the elite units of the Chinese government forces and fought in almost every engagement in the remaining period of the War. By the war's end, General Wang was promoted to command the 4th area army and became a member of the KMT central committee.

== Chinese Civil War ==
When the Chinese Civil War broke out again in 1946, General Wang was named as governor of Shandong Province and commander-in-chief of the 2nd pacification zone. But he had great difficulty to establish his authority due to intense inter-service rivalry among different nationalist commanders and Communist forces stepped up their attacks on isolated nationalist garrisons in the province. In May 1947, his career suffered a serious setback when the 74th enhanced division under his old subordinate lieutenant general Zhang Lingfu was lost in the critical Menglianggu Campaign and most of the nationalist troops assigned to his sector was pulled out of the province to be redeployed elsewhere. When the Chinese communist forces under Chen Yi and Su Yu attacked the provincial capital in 1948 during the Battle of Jinan, General Wang only had local garrison forces which made up by raw recruits and second-rate troops. The fate of Jinan was sealed when one of his corps commanders (Wu Huawen) defected to the Chinese communist forces. The communist troops breached the city defenses and General Wang fled from his headquarters and was captured in a nearby county.

== Later life and death ==
During his imprisonment Wang urged his fellow nationalist commanders to surrender to the PLA and caused a firestorm of controversy since President Chiang Kai-shek always favored him. As result of his collaboration with the communist forces he was among the first nationalist commanders to be released in 1959 with his senior classmate Du Yuming. He worked in the Chinese Political Consultative Conference and other government organizations when the Cultural Revolution broke out. He was forced to go to struggle sessions by the Red Guards and died of a heart attack in 1968. He died under harsh treatment, but was posthumously rehabilitated by Deng Xiaoping's government in 1980 and given a state funeral. His cinerary casket currently rests at the Babaoshan Revolutionary Cemetery mourning hall, as one of China's most important revolutionary heroes.

Wang was survived by his wife, sons and a daughter. Wang's grandchild, Mary-Jean Wong, has followed in her family's tradition of public service, currently serving as a member of the 10th Shandong Committee of the Chinese People's Political Consultative Conference.
