= Xin Qiji =

Chinese poet (1140–1207)

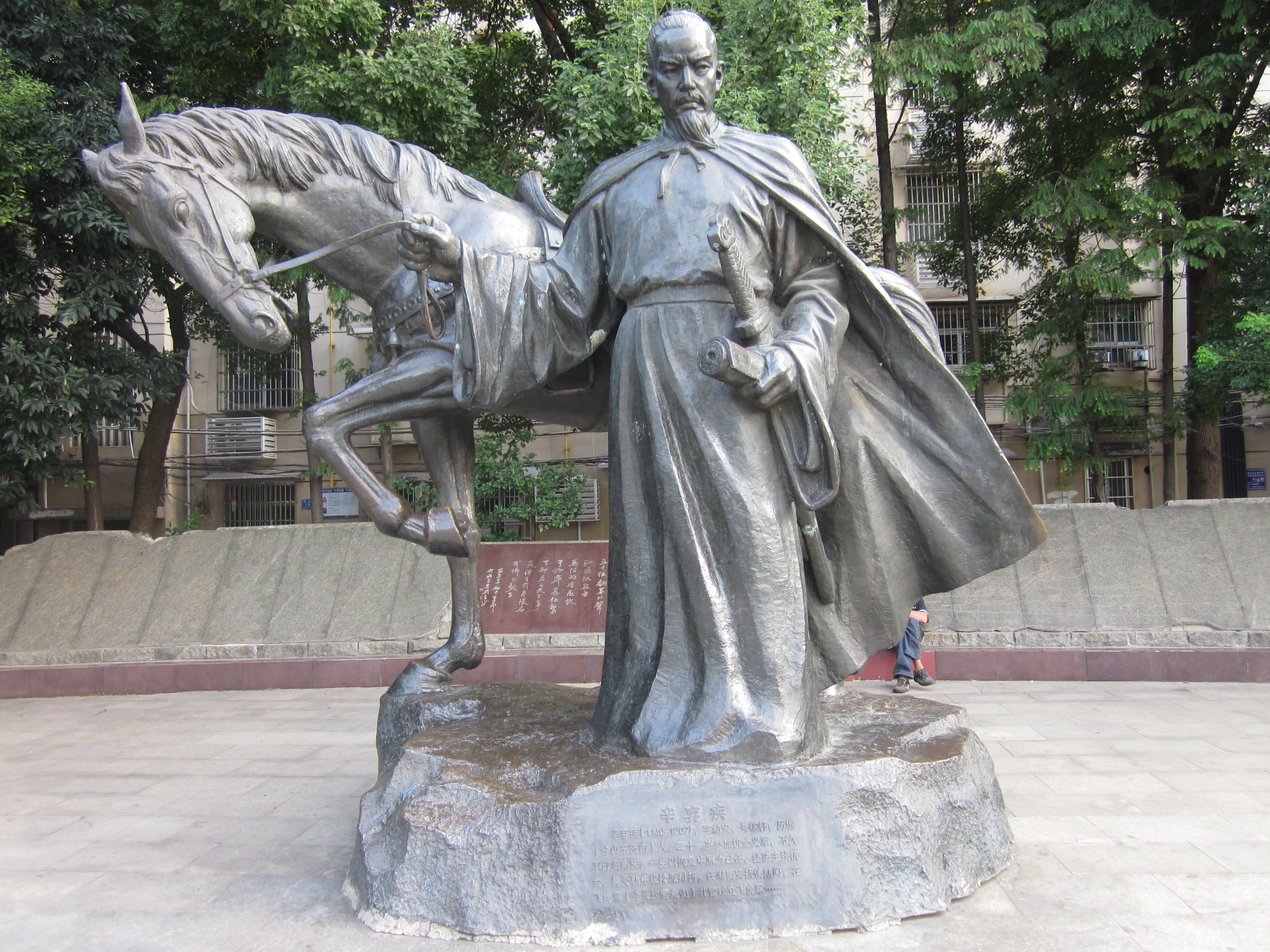
- The statue of Xin Qiji, located in Changsha, Hunan, China.
- Born: Xin Qiji; 28 May 1140; Licheng, Jinan Prefecture, Shandong East Circuit
- Died: 3 October 1207 (aged 67)
- Occupations: Calligrapher, military general, poet

Chinese name
- Traditional Chinese: 辛棄疾
- Simplified Chinese: 辛弃疾
Transcriptions
Standard Mandarin
- Hanyu Pinyin: Xīn Qìjí
- Wade–Giles: Hsin Ch'i-chi

You'an (courtesy name)
- Chinese: 幼安
Transcriptions
Standard Mandarin
- Hanyu Pinyin: Yòu'ān

Jiaxuan (art name)
- Traditional Chinese: 稼軒
- Simplified Chinese: 稼轩
Transcriptions
Standard Mandarin
- Hanyu Pinyin: Jiàxuān

Xin Qiji (28 May 1140 – 3 Oct 1207) was a Chinese poet, calligrapher, and military general during the Southern Song dynasty (1127–1279).

== Life ==
During Xin's lifetime, northern China was occupied during the Jin–Song Wars by the Jurchens of the Jin dynasty, a semi-nomadic people who moved to what is now Northeastern China. Only southern China was ruled by the Han Chinese during the Southern Song dynasty. Xin was born in the modern city of Jinan in Shandong Province, then governed by the Jin Dynasty. Xin was raised by his grandfather because of Xin's father's early death. In his childhood, his grandfather told him about the time when the Han Chinese ruled the north and told him to be an honorable man and seek revenge against the barbarian for the nation. It was then when he developed his patriotic feelings. At the ages of 14 and 17, Xin attended the imperial examination twice, but failed both of them. However, on Xin's way to Jin's capital for examinations, he followed his grandfather's instruction to inspect the military and geographic situation in Jin dynasty. His grandfather named him after a legendary military commander from the Western Han, Huo Qubing. Both "Qubing" and "Qiji" mean to deliver oneself from diseases.

Xin started his military career at the age of twenty-two. He commanded an insurrection group of fifty men and fought the Jurchen alongside Geng Jing's much larger army that consisted of tens of thousands of men. Although they had some small-scale victories, in 1161, because the Jurchen were becoming more united internally, Xin persuaded Geng Jing to join forces with the Southern Song army in order to fight the Jurchen more effectively. Geng Jing agreed but just as Xin finished a meeting with the Southern Song Emperor, who endorsed Geng Jing's troops, Xin learned that Geng Jing had been assassinated by their former friend-turned-traitor, Zhang Anguo (张安国/張安國). With merely fifty men, Xin fought his way through the Jurchen camp and captured Zhang Anguo. Xin then led his men safely back across the border and had Zhang Anguo decapitated by the emperor.

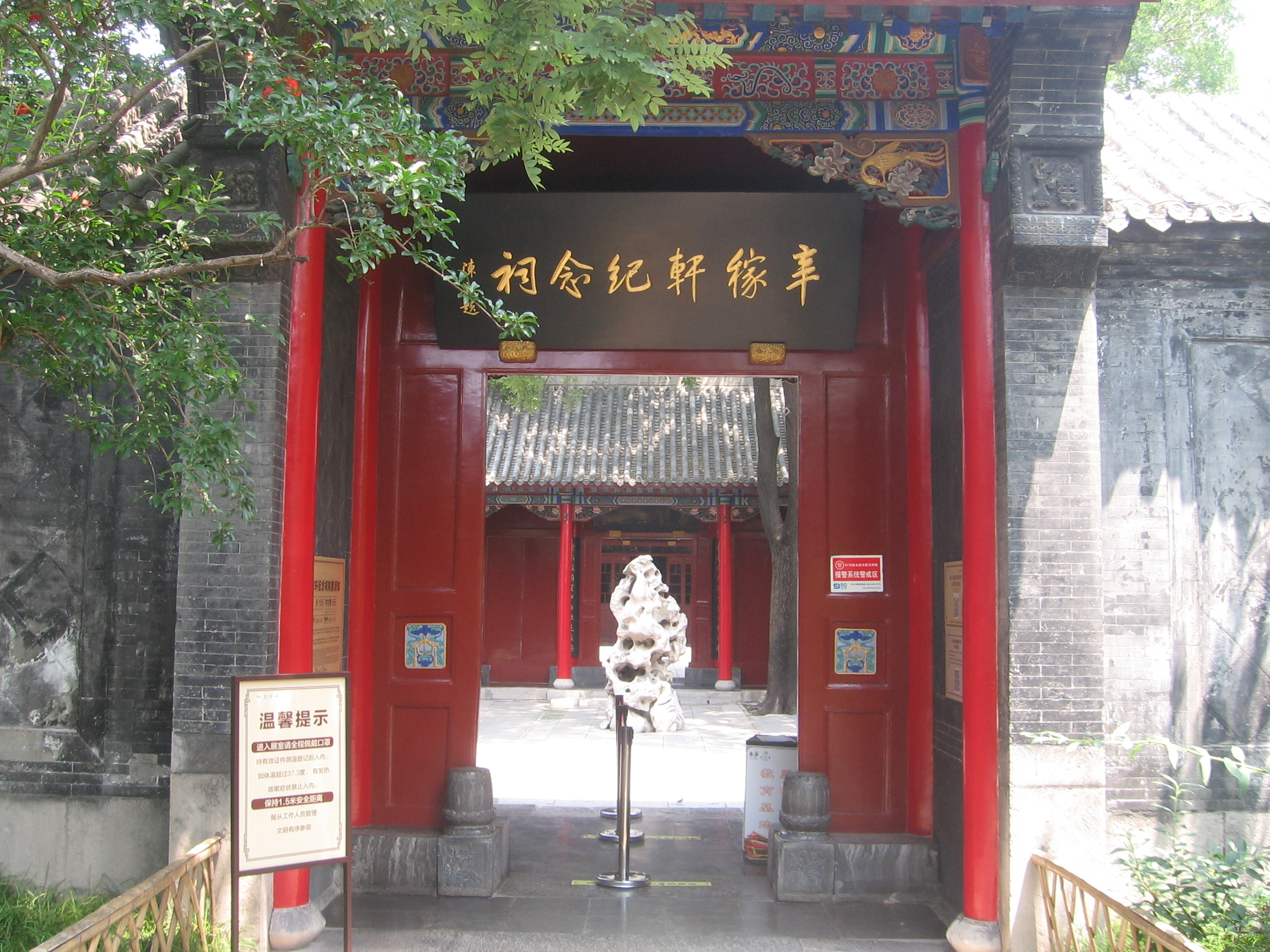
Jiaxuan Ancestral Hall at Daming Lake, Jinan, Shandong, China.

Xin's victory gained him a place in the Southern Song court. However, because the emperor was surrounded by people who supported "an appeasement policy" rather than open warfare with the Jin, Xin was sidelined. From 1161 to 1181, he held a series of minor posts that never amounted to anything momentous. Although during the same period, he tried to offer the emperor his treatises on how to manage the invasions by the Jin as well as other state affairs, he was never taken seriously. Finally he resolved to do things on his own. He improved the irrigation systems in his district, relocated poverty-struck peasants and trained his own troops. His ambition soon aroused suspicion against him. In 1181, he was forced to resign. He left for Jiangxi where he then stayed and perfected his famous ci form of poetry for ten depressing years.

In 1192, Xin was recalled to the Song court to take up another minor post because the previous incumbent had died. This job did not last long because once he completed the requirements of his job, he started training men for military purposes again. He was soon discharged.

From 1192 to 1203, Xin lived in seclusion around Jiangxi Province. Xin gave himself an art name – "Jiaxuan" (稼轩), which meant "Life should be diligent and take farming as the prime importance".

In 1188, Xin met another patriotic poet, Chen Liang, in E hu Temple (around Piao Spring, Jiangxi Province). They conferred the strategy to fight against Jin dynasty and revive their home country.

During Xin's seclusion, Xin also traveled with Zhu Xi, the master of Neo Confucianism, in Wuyi Mountain. In 1200, upon Zhu xi's death, none of Zhu's old friends or students mourned him because of the political restriction. However, Xin attended the funeral and wrote lament for Zhu.

In 1203, as the Jin began pressing harder against the Southern Song border, Han Tuozhou, the consul of the Southern Song court, in need of militarists, took Xin under his wing. However, Han Tuozhou disregarded Xin's sincere advice for effective military moves, and he removed Xin from his team the next year, accusing Xin of being lubricious, avaricious, and many other non-existent faults. The crucial moment came in 1207 when the Jin defiantly asked for Han Tuozhou's head for a peace treaty. It was then that Han realized that he needed Xin again. Xin did not hesitate in responding to Han's call for help; unfortunately, he died of old age soon afterward.

In 1208, after Xin's death, Ni si impeached him for committing treason and requested the Southern Song government to deprive's Xin's official title. In 1257, Xie Fangde petitioned the Southern Song government for justifying Xin's innocence. The government then vindicated Xin and endowed him a posthumous title – "Zhong Min", which meant loyalty and encouragement.

== Works ==
Some six hundred and twenty of Xin's poems survive today. All were written after he moved to the south.

=== Poetry ===
Scholars considered Xin's literary caliber to be equally talented in ci as his Song dynasty counterpart, Su Shi. Their difference, however, is that the content of Xin's poetry spans an even greater range of topics. Xin is also famous for employing many allusions in his poems.

Some of the most quoted lines from his poetry (with accompanying translations) are shown below.

《賀新郎》 "甚矣吾衰矣。悵平生、交遊零落，只今余幾！ 白發空垂三千丈，壹笑人間萬事。問何物、能令公喜？ 我見青山多嫵媚，料青山見我應如是。情與貌，略相似。 壹尊搔首東窗裏。想淵明《停雲》詩就，此時風味。 江左沈酣求名者，豈識濁醪妙理。 回首叫、雲飛風起。不恨古人吾不見，恨古人不見吾狂耳。知我者，二三子。”	Too much have I decayed! "Alas, all my life I've seen friends and companions fall off, And now how many of them survive? With gray hair hanging in vain three thousand zhang long, I laugh away all worldly things. Is there anything left, you ask, that might cheer me? I see in green mountains such charm allure, I expect they see the same in me, For in heart and in appearance We are a bit similar. Goblet in hand, scratching my head at the east window, I presume that Tao Yuanming, having finished his poem Hovering Clouds, Was in the same mood I am now. Those on the south side of the Yangtze who play drunkard in pursuit of fame, How could they know the magic of unstrained wine? Looking back, I'll conjure a gust of wind and send clouds flying. I regret not that I can't meet the ancients, But that the ancients had no chance to see my wildness. Those who understand me Number only two or three."

《鷓鴣天》 "壯歲旌旗擁萬夫，錦襜突騎渡江初。燕兵夜娖銀胡觮，漢箭朝飛金仆姑。 追往事，嘆今吾，春風不染白髭須。卻將萬字平戎策。換得東家種樹書。”	Partridge Sky When I was young I waved a flag to lead a thousand soldiers horses too how my men fashioned arrows of silver at night they brought down the moon now the enemy owns it I come back I'm nobody now thinking of the past how one sighs to be neglected Spring won't bring back the black to my bread you can't imagine the tracts I wrote on tactics for this country In return I'm given this poor field bent mattock and some weather-worn to me titled 'how to grow tree'

《賀新郎》 "將軍百戰身名裂,向河梁、回頭萬裏，故人長絕。 易水蕭蕭西風冷，滿座衣冠似雪。 正壯士、悲歌未徹。啼鳥還知如許恨，料不啼清淚長啼血。 誰共我，醉明月。”	Battled for a hundred times Broke my body and reputation Now stand on the imminence of departure Look back on my grand homeland Deceased all my old friends The river is bleak, the wind is cold Those who bid me farewell, are all with white coats and hats white as snow, white as nihility The elegy never ends never ends its tune, never ends its nostalgia never ends its resolve to fight If the mockingbird knows my regret it won't cry it will tear with blood After this departure who will watch the moon along with me in the different remote places in the same solitary night

《青玉案·元夕》 "衆裏尋他千百度，驀然回首，那人卻在燈火闌珊處。”	"But in the crowd once and again I look for her in vain. When all at once I turn my head, I find her there where lantern light is dimly shed."

《醜奴兒》 "少年不識愁滋味，愛上層樓。 愛上層樓，為賦新詞強說愁。 而今識盡愁滋味，欲說還休。 欲說還休，卻道天涼好個秋。"	The rendition by Lin Yutang (with an ABBA, CDDC rhyme scheme) is: "In my young days, I had tasted only gladness But loved to mount the top floor, But loved to mount the top floor, To write a song pretending sadness. And now I have tasted Sorrow’s flavours, bitter and sour, And can’t find a word, And can’t find a word. But merely say, "What a golden autumn hour!”	Another rendition is: "When young I never did know the taste of woe or sorrow, Up to the top floor, I loved to go; Up to the top floor, I loved to go, For to compose new verses, I feigned my sorrow and woe. Yet now that I've known the taste of woe, sorrow and bitterness, I hesitate to mention it. Hesitate to mention it, What a beautifully chilly autumn! I say, after all."

In the last line, there is a sudden transition from Xin's personal understanding of melancholy to the season that he's experiencing. The autumn carries many meanings in Chinese literature. It can be construed here as a deeper understanding of the last line being full of sadness, including:

- True sorrow can't be expressed by words;
- Repeating the sorrow as another deep hurt;
- The understanding that even if one is able to find the words to show bitterness, no one understands it;
- The understanding that even if people who understand your bitterness are found, nothing will be changed.

=== Calligraphy ===
Little of Xin's calligraphy has survived. Quguo tie is the only preserved one which is now documented in Beijing Palace Museum. Quguo tie was created in Xin's 36 years old (around 1175 Oct), after Xin suppressed the bandit's rebellion in Jiangxi.

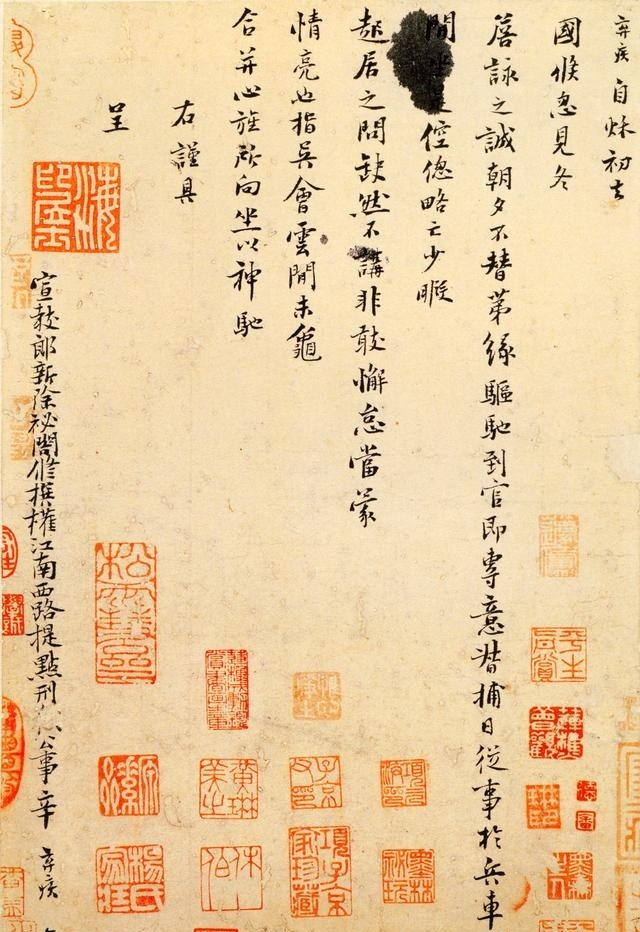
Quguo Tie

== Commentaries ==
The 20th-century Chinese diplomat and philosopher Hu Shih asserts that Xin Qiji ranks first among authors in creative lyrics. According to Hu, Xin shows great talent, keen intellect, intensive and sincere feeling in writing lyrics.

The Chinese ethnologist and historian Bai Shouyi stated that Xin Qiji aimed his life at recovering the lost territories and contributing to his country. Unfortunately, Xin was ill-fated and repressed, and so failed to realize his ambitions. However, Xin never shook his patriotic resolve, and put all his enthusiasm and worries about national destiny to the creation of poetry.

The Chinese historian Deng Guangming contends that although Xin was inherently an extremely passionate patriot, he was forced to pretend to be a detached and calm man, who is indifferent about political affairs.

== Portrayal of Xin Qiji in the arts ==
=== Film ===
The film 辛弃疾1162, also known as Fighting for the Motherland 1162, published in 2020 by Zheijang Media Trust Film, portrayed the role of Xin Qiji in the uprising of 1162.

== See also ==
- List of Chinese authors
- Song poetry
