= Liberation Pavilion =

Monument in Jinan, Shandong, China

Coordinates: 36°39′46.08″N 117°1′40.01″E

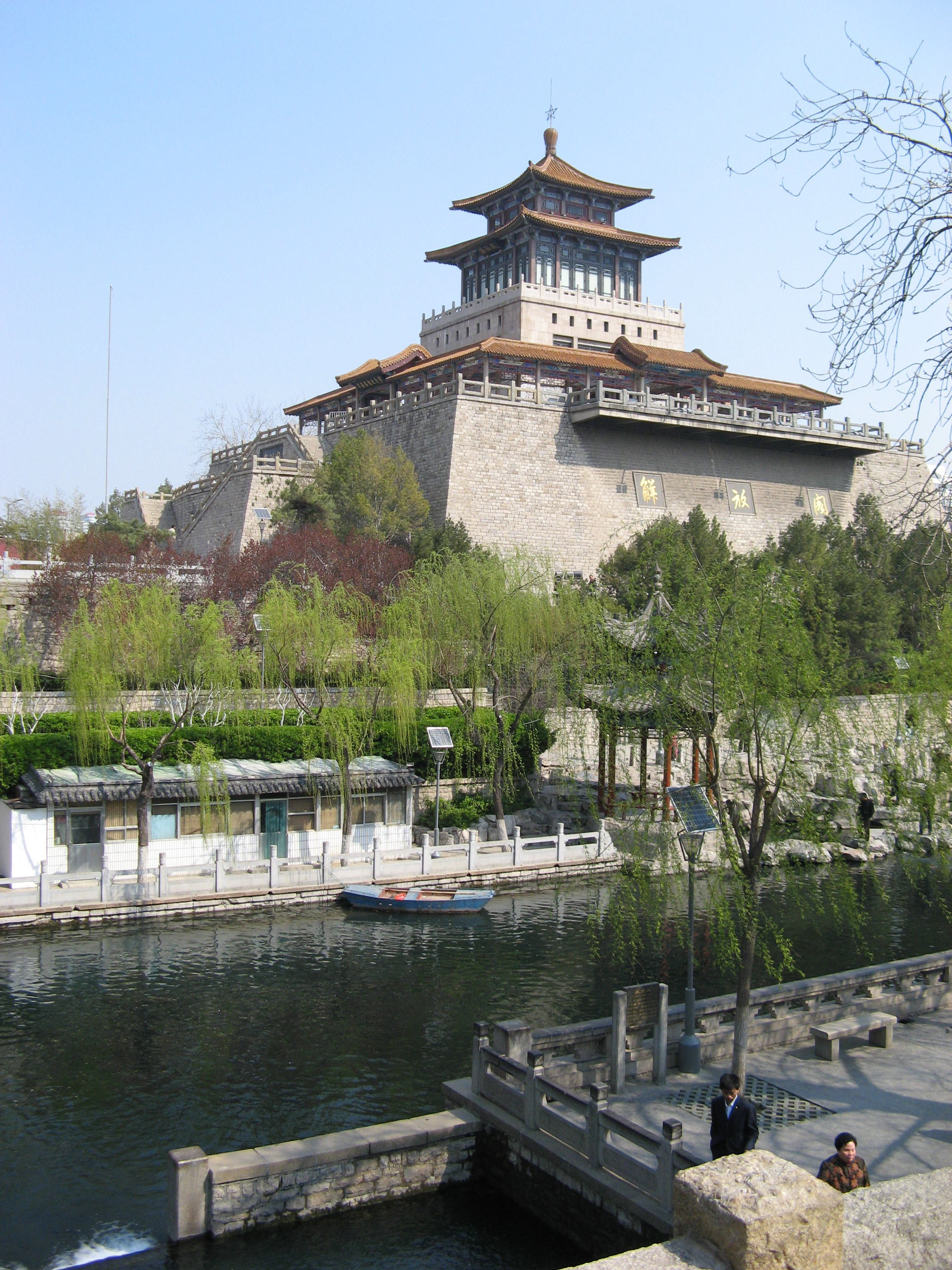
Liberation Pavilion

The Liberation Pavilion (Chinese: 解放阁; pinyin: Jiefàng Gé) is a monument commemorating the storming of the city of Jinan, Shandong by the People's Liberation Army during the Battle of Jinan in the Chinese Civil War. It stands in the inner south-eastern corner of the city moat near the site where the troops of People's Liberation Army breached the city wall on September 24, 1948. The city wall has since been removed.

Construction of the pavilion was completed in September 1986. The entire structure stands about 34 meters tall and occupies an area of 617 square meters. Its overall architectural design follows classical Chinese patterns. Set on broad stone pedestal, the pavilion proper has two stories and is capped by an eaved roof. However, the sides of the pedestal are decorated with bas-relief stone carvings that depict scenes from the civil-war battle for Jinan in the style of Socialist realism. Another notable decorative feature of the pavilion are the gilded relief inscriptions that read "Liberation Pavilion" on the stone pedestal as well as on the pavilion proper. The characters of these inscriptions were taken from the handwriting of Marshal Chen Yi, who commanded the Shandong counter-offensive during the Chinese Civil War. The interior of the pavilion houses an exhibition related to the civil war battle for Jinan.

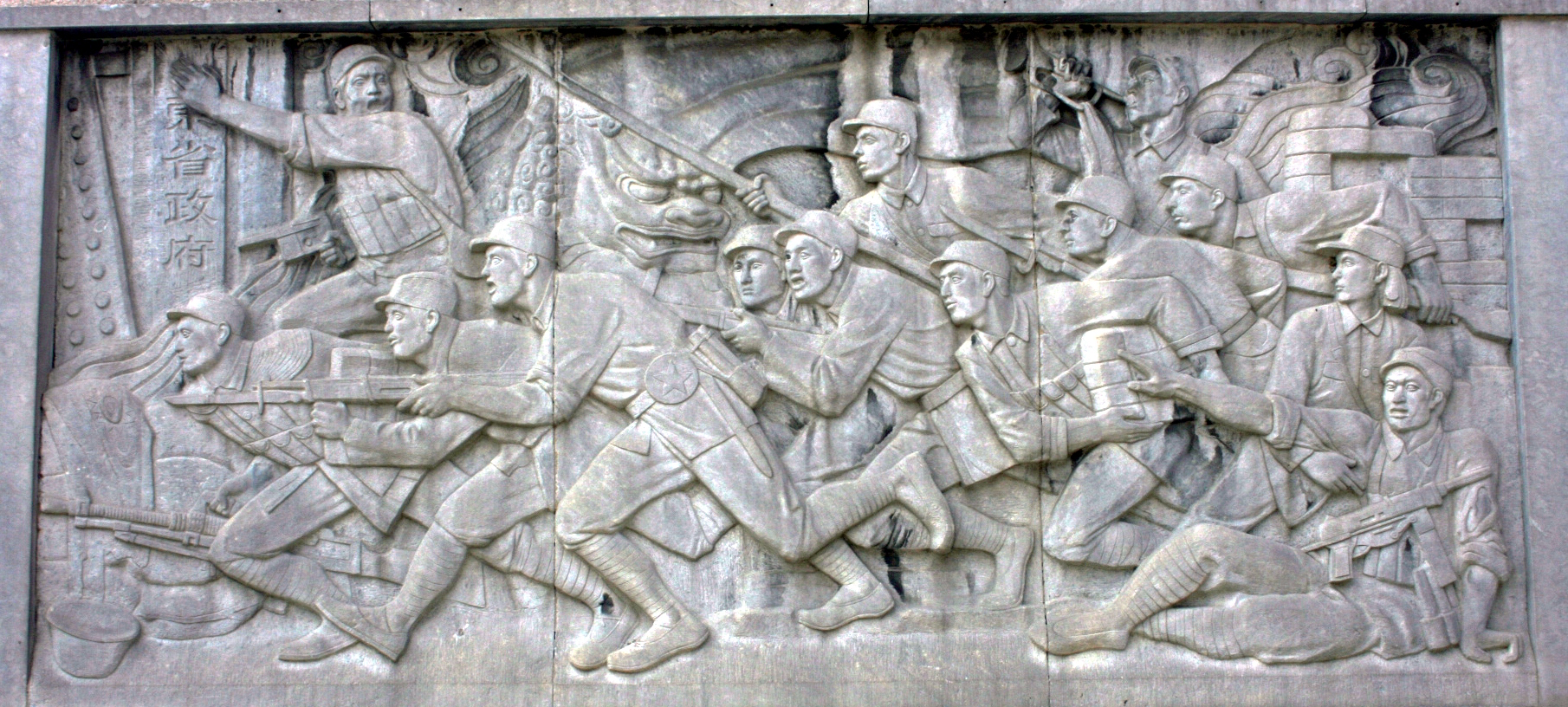
Relief depicting the storming of the provincial government.

== See also ==
- List of sites in Jinan
- Battle of Jinan
