= Wu Huawen =

- 吴化文
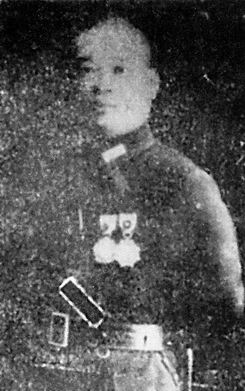
- Born: 1904; Laizhou, Shandong, Qing dynasty
- Died: 1962 (aged 57–58); Shanghai, People's Republic of China
- Military career
- Allegiance: Republic of China (to 1943); Wang Jingwei regime (to 1945); People's Republic of China
- Service years: 1928–1948
- Rank: Lieutenant General
- Unit: Northwestern Army
- Commands: 96th corps 35th corps
- Conflicts: Second Sino-Japanese War; Chinese Civil War
- Awards: Order of Liberation (China)

Wu Huawen (simplified Chinese: 吴化文; traditional Chinese: 吳化文; pinyin: Wú Huàwén, 1904–1962) was a military commander during the Second Sino-Japanese War and the Chinese Civil War. During his career, he switched his allegiance three times, first from the Kuomintang to a Japanese puppet government, then back to the Kuomintang, and finally to the Communist People's Liberation Army.

In 1928, Wu Huawen became Head of Training Department, Luoyang Junior Military Officer School of the North-western Army. After that came appointments as Chief of Staff and commanding officer of the Reconnaissance Regiment in the 25th Division of the 2nd Army Group (1928–1930), Deputy Head of the Higher Training Corps of the 3rd Route Army (1930–1931), commanding officer of the pistol brigade, 3rd Route Army (1931–1938), commanding officer of the 28th Independent Brigade, 3rd Route Army (1938–1939), and general officer commanding the 4th New Division (1939–1943).

In 1943, a few years after the execution of his superior Han Fuju (in 1938), he defected to the Japanese, taking many of Han's troops with him. In the same year, he joined the Reorganized National Government of China, a puppet state under Japanese control. He served as Commander in Chief of the 3rd Front Army for Wang Jingwei's government until 1945, when he rejoined the Kuomintang government. From 1945 until 1948, he held several commands: general officer commanding the 5th New Route Army and general officer commanding the Southern Jin-Pu Railway Garrison (1945–1946), commanding officer of the 7th Column (1946), commanding officer of the 2nd Shandong Security Column (1946–1947), and general officer commanding the 84th Division (1947–1948).

In 1948, he was given command of the 96th Army and was tasked of defending the outer ring of fortifications in the Battle of Jinan against the attack by the Communist People's Liberation Army. Before the beginning of the battle, Wu Huawen defected to the Communist side taking a large number of troops with him and hence delivering a decisive blow to the Kuomintang defense of the city. After his defection, he was given the post of general officer commanding the 35th Army in the People's Liberation Army, which also incorporated the troops he had taken with him. During the Yangtze River Crossing campaign, he was instrumental in the capture of Nanjing.
