= Zhang Yanghao =

Chinese writer and sanqu poet (1270–1329)

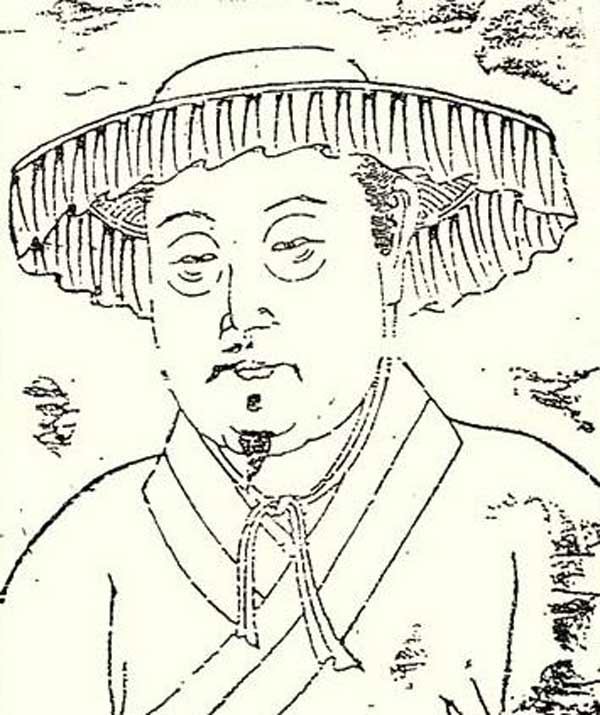
- Born: 1270; Licheng District, Jinan
- Died: 1329 (aged 58–59)
- Occupations: writer, government official
- Known for: Sanqu poetry

Zhang Yanghao (traditional Chinese: 張養浩; simplified Chinese: 张养浩; pinyin: Zhāng Yǎnghào; 1270–1329), courtesy name Ximeng, was a Chinese writer from Shandong who lived during the Yuan dynasty and authored prose, poems, as well as songs. He is particularly well known for his Sanqu poetry. Among his works is one of the most frequently anthologized poems of the "meditation on the past" (懷古; 怀古; huáigǔ) genre, a song poem titled "Meditation on the Past at Tong Pass" (潼關懷古; 潼关怀古; Tóngguān Huáigǔ) and set to the tune of "Sheep on Mountain Slope" (Chinese: 山坡羊; pinyin: Shānpō yáng). Besides his work as a writer, Zhang Yanghao also held high government posts and served at one time as head of the Ministry of Rites. His tomb is in Shandong, to the north of the city center of Jinan.

== Meditation on the Past at Tong Pass ==
The song poem "Meditation on the Past at Tong Pass" is Zhang Yanghao most well-known work. It reads:

Traditional Chinese	Simplified Chinese	Pinyin	English translation
峰巒如聚，	峰峦如聚，	Fēng luán rú jù,	Peaks and ridges press together,
波濤如怒，	波涛如怒，	bō tāo rú nù,	waves and torrents rage,
山河表裏潼關路。	山河表里潼关路。	shān hé biǎo lǐ Tóng Guān lù.	zigzagging between the mountains and the river runs the road through Tong Pass.
望西都，	望西都，	Wàng xī dū,	I look to the western capital,
意躊躇。	意踌躇。	yì chóu chú.	my thoughts linger.
傷心秦漢經行處，	伤心秦汉经行处，	Shāng xīn qín hàn jīng xíng chù,	It breaks my heart to come to the old place of the Qin and Han,
宮闕萬間都做了土。	宫阙万间都做了土。	gōng qué wàn jiān dōu zuò le tǔ.	now palaces and terraces have all turned to dust.
興，	兴，	Xīng,	[Dynasties] rise,
百姓苦；	百姓苦；	bǎi xìng kǔ;	the common folk suffer;
亡，	亡，	Wáng,	[Dynasties] fall,
百姓苦。	百姓苦。	bǎi xìng kǔ.	the common folk suffer.

== List of poems ==
- Untitled (Chinese: 普天樂·楚離; pinyin: Pǔtiān yuè·Chu lí)
- Untitled (traditional Chinese: 慶東原; simplified Chinese: 庆东原; pinyin: Qìng dōng yuán)
- Shan Po Yang: Thinking of the Past at the Tong Pass (traditional Chinese: 山坡羊:潼關懷古; simplified Chinese: 山坡羊:潼关怀古; pinyin: Shān pō yáng: Tóng guān huái gǔ)
