= Yanzhou campaign =

1948 Chinese series of battles

- Part of the Chinese Civil War
Date	May 29, 1948 – July 18, 1948
Location	Shandong, China
Result	Communist victory

Belligerents
Flag of the National Revolutionary Army Republic of China Army	PLA People's Liberation Army

Commanders and leaders
Huo Shouyi	Xu Shiyou; Tan Zhenlin

Strength
100,000	70,000

Casualties and losses
63,000	Unknown

The Yanzhou campaign (Chinese: 兖州战役; pinyin: Yǎnzhōu Zhànyì), also known as the campaign at the central section of the Tianjin-Pukou Railway (Chinese: 津浦路中段战役; pinyin: Jīn Pŭ Lù Zhōng Duàn Zhànyì), was a series of battles fought between the nationalists and the communists for the control of the town Yanzhou, which is today under the administration of Jining, and the region to the north of the town in Shandong, China during the Chinese Civil War in the post World War II era, and resulted in communist victory.

== Prelude ==
By the summer of 1948, military setbacks had forced the nationalist army in Shandong into the defensive. The nationalists withdrew into major cities such as Jinan and Qingdao while stationing some forces along the Tianjin-Pukou Railway to secure the communication / transportation line. The communists decided to deploy their units in Shandong to annihilate the enemy gradually in the region from Tai'an in the north to Xue City (Chinese: 薛城; pinyin: Xue Cheng) in the south. This would lead to encircling Xuzhou by linking up with the communist forces in southwestern Shandong. The success of this campaign would assist another communist summer offensive, the Eastern Henan Campaign. To carry out the plan, the local communists in Shandong decided to first take Tai'an and the surrounding regions in the north and south, thus cutting off the link between Yanzhou and Jinan, and then take the isolated Yanzhou and ambush any nationalist reinforcement sent for the town.

== Order of battle ==
Defenders: nationalist order of battle:

- The 10th Pacification Zone Command
- The Reorganized 12th Army
  - The Reorganized 12th Division
- The 2nd Division
- The Reorganized 25th Division
- The Reorganized 84th Division
- Numerous local security divisions

Attackers: communist order of battle:

- The 7th Column
- The 9th Column
- The 13th Column
- Units from the Central Shandong Military District
- Units from the Southern Shandong Military District

== First stage ==
On May 29, 1948, the communist Shandong Corps launched its campaign against nationalist targets along the central section of the Tianjin-Pukou Railway, and forced the nationalist 155th Brigade of the Reorganized 84th Division guarding Tai'an to abandon the city and retreated northward. The communist forces were able to expand their victory from Tai'an northward and southward, and by June 20, 1948, other cities and towns including Dawenkou (Chinese: 大汶口; pinyin: Da Wen Kou; lit. 'Big Wen Mouth'), Qufu (east of Yanzhou), and Zoucheng (south of Yanzhou) had fallen into their hands. Meanwhile, Yanzhou was besieged by the communist 7th Column. By June 25, 1948, the nationalist stronghold outside the town, Four Pass (Chinese: 四关; pinyin: Si Guan) had fallen into enemy hands.

In order to reinforce Yanzhou, the nationalist Reorganized 25th Division stationed in northern Jiangsu was sent from Xuzhou along the Tianjin-Pukou Railway, and its advanced guard had reached the region of Jie River (Chinese: 界河; pinyin: Jie He; lit. 'Border River') north of Tengzhou by June 28, 1948. The communists decided to ambush the nationalist reinforcement by deploying the 9th Column and the 13th Column, while the communist 7th Column was ordered to stop its assault on Yanzhou (兖州) and redeployed to assist the 9th and the 13th Columns. As the communists laid their trap, the nationalists changed their priority. The nationalist forces in Sui (睢) County and Qi (杞) County in eastern Henan, under the command of the corps commander Qu Shounian (区寿年), were besieged by the enemy and the situation was far more desperate than Yanzhou, so the nationalist Reorganized 25th Division was redeployed to Shangqiu by rail to reinforce the battlefield in eastern Henan, and thus inadvertently avoided the ambush set up for them.

The nationalist redeployment had left a strategically important town, Yanzhou, dangerously undermanned: the nationalist garrison of the town only had the Reorganized 12th Army and security divisions totaling 28,000 troops. The nationalists were betting on several factors that favored the defenders securing the city: As an important junction of the Tianjin-Pukou Railway, nationalist reinforcement from other places could readily reach the town via railroad. Being located on the western bank of the Si (泗) River, the area surrounding the town was wide open with little cover for would-be attackers. Furthermore, there were semi-permanent fortifications both inside and outside the town. The battle and the consequent fall of the town into the enemy hands proved that these advantages could not be counted on. The communists decided to attack Yanzhou (兖州) again by concentrating a total of fifteen brigades from the Shandong Corps and local units to take the town and annihilate nationalist reinforcement. The communist 7th Column, 13th Column and units from Central Shandong Military District were tasked to attack the town, while the communist 9th Column was deployed to the north of Yanzhou, and communist units from southern Shandong Military District were deployed to the south of Yanzhou to ambush nationalist reinforcements. The communist Bohai Column was deployed to the east of Jinan to prevent nationalists stationed in the city from reinforcing Yanzhou.

== Second stage ==
On July 1, 1948, the communist Shandong Corps besieged Yanzhou again. The communist 7th Column and the bulk of the communist 13th Column were tasked with the major responsibility for attacking eastward from the west, with emphasis on the Old Western Gate (Chinese: 老西门; pinyin: Lao Xi Men) and the New Western Gate (Chinese: 新西门; pinyin: Xin Xi Men). The communist units of the Central Shandong Military District and a portion of the communist 13th Column were deployed to the northeast and east of the town to assist the main attacking force. At 5:00 p.m. on July 12, 1948, the assault on the city began. The intense fire destroyed the city wall along the Old and New Western Gates sections, and associated defensive positions. Under the cover of the shelling of mountain guns, the attacking infantry breached the defense and penetrated into the city at 8:30 p.m. After a failed attempt to breakout to the east, the nationalist garrison was completely annihilated, with the nationalist commander-in-chief of the region and the commander of the Reorganized 12th Army, Huo Shouyi (霍守义), captured alive. The town was declared secured by the communist forces at 6:00 p.m. on July 13, 1948, after the mop up operation was completed.

As Yanzhou was besieged once again, the nationalist Reorganized 84th Division and the 2nd Division went out to reinforce their comrades-in-arms, but due to the fear of being ambushed, their progress was extremely slow. When the advanced guard of the nationalist reinforcement had cross the Wen (汶) River and reached the town of Taiping (Chinese: 太平镇; pinyin: Tai Ping Zhen) on July 13, 1948, the news of the fall of Yanzhou had reached the nationalists, who immediately withdrew northward. However, the retreating nationalists were caught up by the pursuing communist forces and the nationalist Reorganized 84th Division was badly mauled by the communist 9th Column, losing over 10,000 troops, including most of its 161st Brigade. This last battle concluded the campaign.

== Outcome ==
The nationalists suffered more than 63,000 casualties in their defeat, and a dozen cities / towns including Qufu, Jining, Tai'an, Zou (邹) County, and Yanzhou had fallen into the enemy hands. The nationalist garrison in Jinan was further isolated and the enemy succeeded in combining the previously separated communist bases in central and southern Shandong and western Shandong into a new one of much greater size. The fall of the strategically important railroad junction Yanzhou also meant that both Xuzhou in the south and Jinan in the north controlled by the nationalists were threatened by the enemy, and communist victory also helped their Eastern Henan Campaign by tying down the nationalists forces in Shandong.

== See also ==
- Outline of the Chinese Civil War
- National Revolutionary Army
- History of the People's Liberation Army
