= Battle of Jinan =

Battle of the Chinese Civil War in 1948

- Part of Chinese Civil War
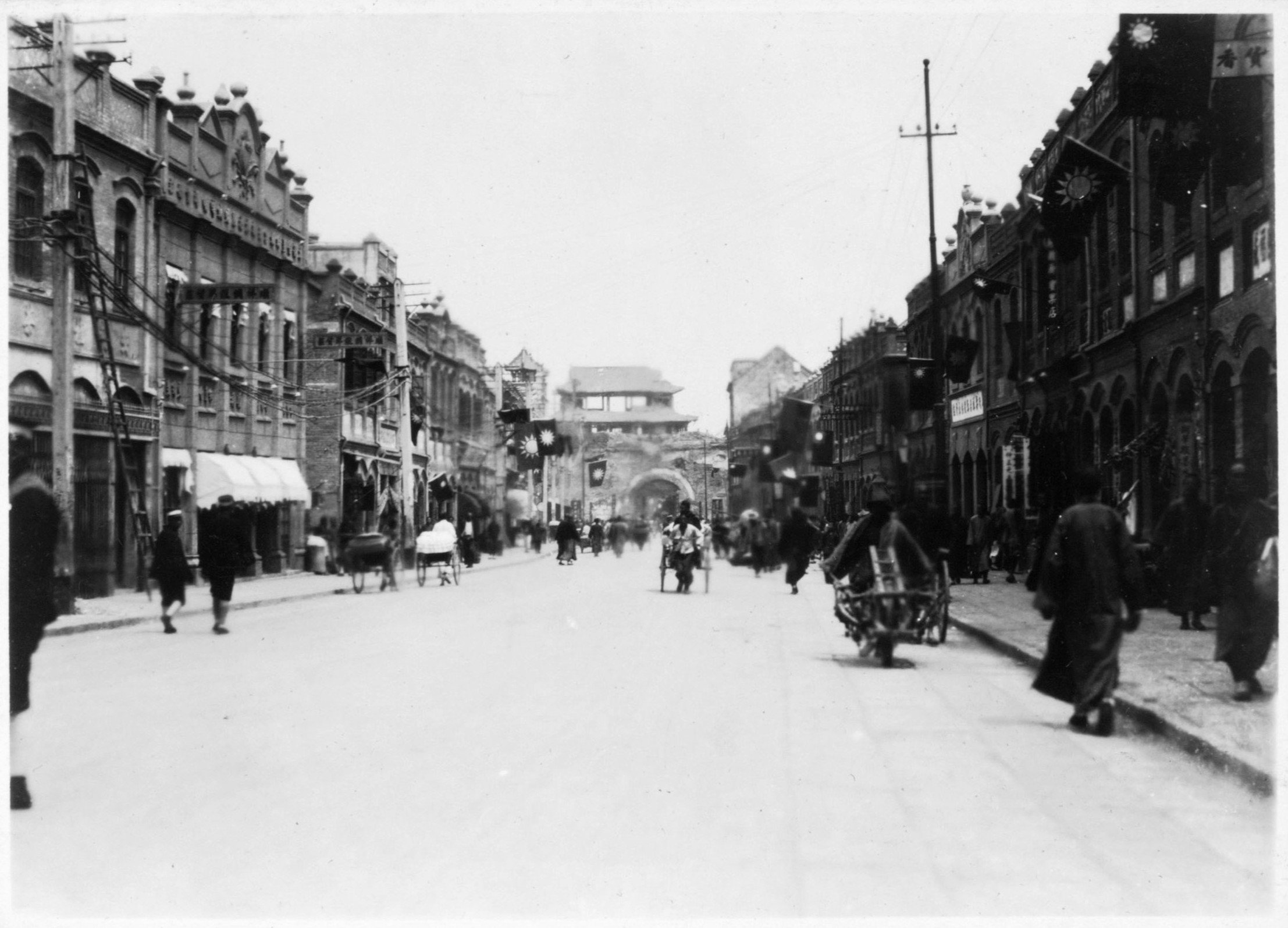
- Jinan in the 1940s
Date	September 16–24, 1948
Location	Jinan, Republic of China 36°40′N 116°59′E
Result	Communist victory

Belligerents
(Republic of China (1912–1949)) Republic of China	Chinese Communist Party

Commanders and leaders
(Republic of China (1912–1949)) Wang Yaowu (POW) (Republic of China (1912–1949)) Wu Huawen (defected)	Chen Yi; Su Yu; Xu Shiyou; Tan Zhenlin; Wang Jianan

Strength
104,296	140,000 (involved in attack); 180,000 (support)

Casualties and losses
22,423 dead , 61,873 captured , 20,000 defected	26,000 (dead and wounded)

The Battle of Jinan was a critical engagement fought between the Kuomintang (KMT or Chinese Nationalist Party) and the Chinese Communist Party (CCP) from September 16 to September 24, 1948, during the Chinese Civil War. The communist Eastern China Field Army besieged and finally captured the city of Jinan, the capital of Shandong Province and a major urban center as well as a transportation hub in northeastern China that had a population of about 600,000 at the time of the battle. The communist victory set the stage for the Huaihai Campaign.

The defenders of Jinan had become isolated in the summer of 1948, when the communist Eastern China Field Army commanded by Chen Yi captured the railway line south of the city. In charge of the city's defense was general Wang Yaowu, he commanded nine regular brigades, five security brigades, as well as special force units amounting to a total troop strength of about 100,000.

The defenses of Jinan were organized into two lines: an outer ring around the outskirts of the city and inner line following the historical city wall. The outer ring was fortified by a four-ply line of pillboxes, barbed wire, and a newly dug 3-meter wide moat. The inner ring consisted of the ancient brick wall of the city that had been strengthened with sand bags. The most valuable strategic assets of the city, the main airfield, the railroad station, and the commercial district, were located to the west of the historical city center and outside of the inner ring. Hence, they were protected only by the outer ring of defenses.

The communist forces encircled the city in a pincer movement carried out by an eastern and a western group. The eastern group was composed of the 9th column, the Bohai column, and one division of the Bohai military region. The western group consistent of the 3rd column, the 10th column, the Liang Guang column, four regiments of the mid-south Shandong column, and one division from the Jiluyu (Hebei-Shandong-Henan) Military Region. The 13th column served as the preparation team for the entire attack.

General Wu Huawen (Chinese: 吴化文; pinyin: Wú Huàwén) was in charge of the outer ring of defenses. General Wu defected to the communist side with about 8,000 of his troops before the battle began. His defection may have been prompted by letter sent to him by close relatives who had been captured by the Communists in the summer. Most of Wu's troops had fought on the Japanese side during the Second Sino-Japanese War and were integrated into Su Yu's forces immediately. After the outer ring of defenses was lost due to Wu's defection, communist forces launched a bloody assault on the historical city center. The historical city wall was first breached at its southeastern corner around 2am on September 24. Another breach at the southwest corner also occurred before dawn. After the city wall was breached, the remaining Kuomintang garrison was quickly overrun and captured.

General Wang Yaowu tried to escape in civilian clothes but was captured in Shouguang County. Pang Jingtang(Chinese: 庞镜塘; pinyin: Páng Jìngtáng), the Kuomintang party chief in Shandong as well as 23 other high-ranking Kuomintang officials were also captured.

Jinan was the first major urban center to be captured by the communists (the Siege of Changchun had begun on May 23 already, but the city was only captured on October 19, 1948). Zhou Enlai hence referred to the Battle of Jinan as the starting point for the "three great battles" (Chinese: 三大战役; pinyin: sān dà zhànyì), namely the Liaoshen Campaign (the first stage of which had already begun on September 12, 1948, i.e., a few days prior to the Battle of Jinan), the Huaihai Campaign, and the Pingjin Campaign that established communist control over northern China.

== See also ==
- Outline of the Chinese Civil War
- History of the People's Liberation Army
- Jinan Liberation Pavilion

== Gallery ==
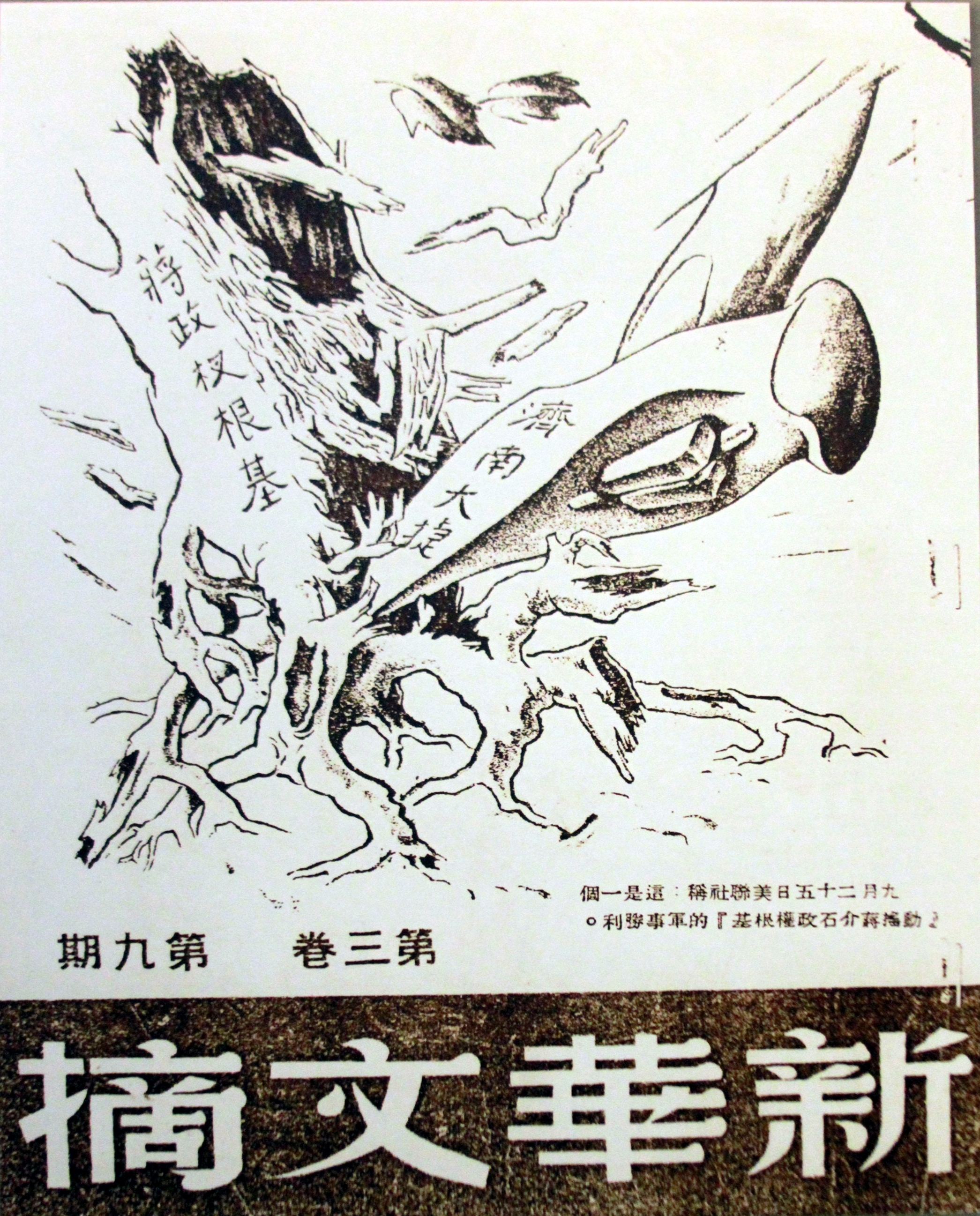
Communist cartoon portraying the victory of Jinan as a decisive blow.

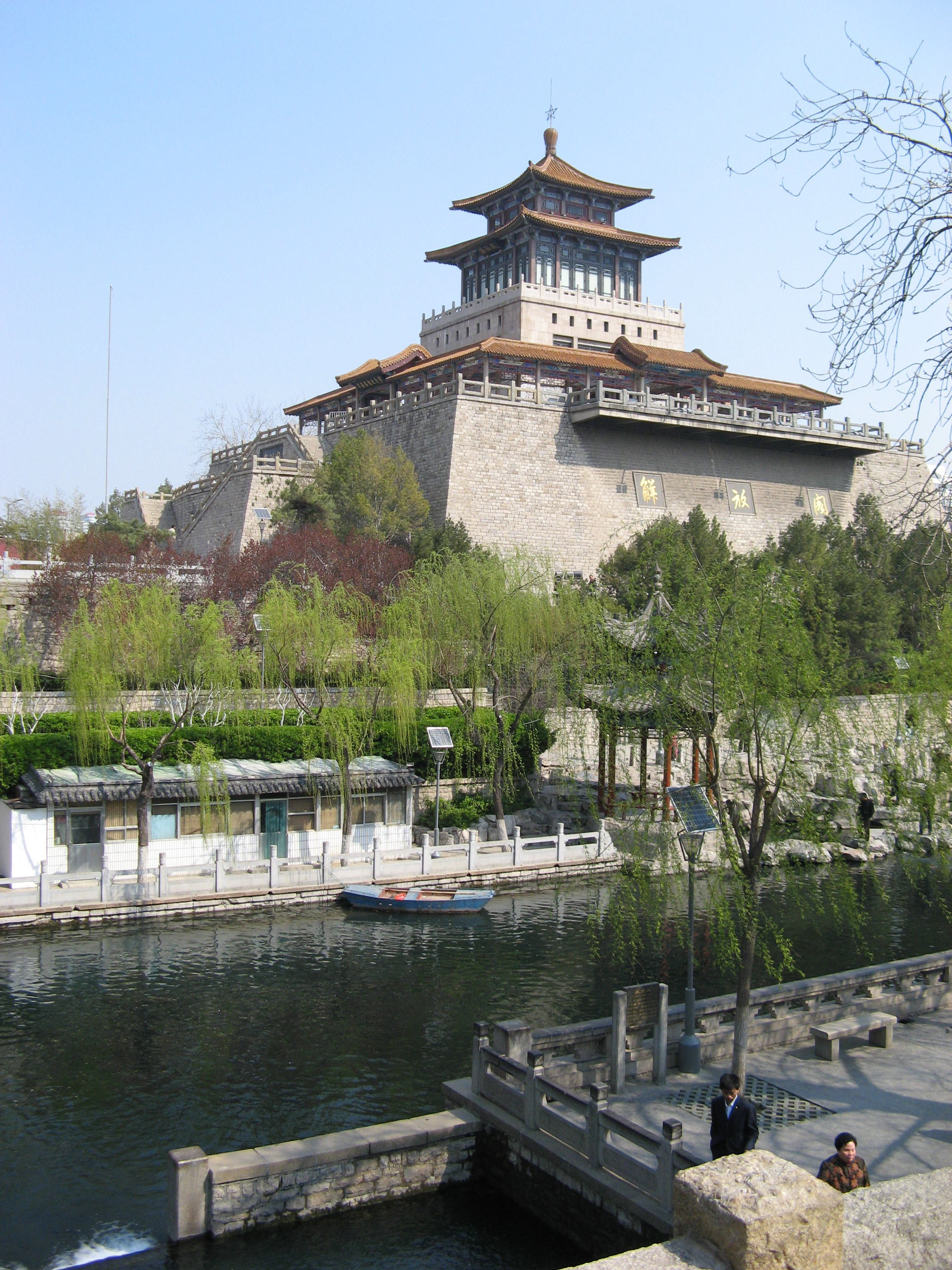
Liberation pavilion at the site of the first city wall breach.

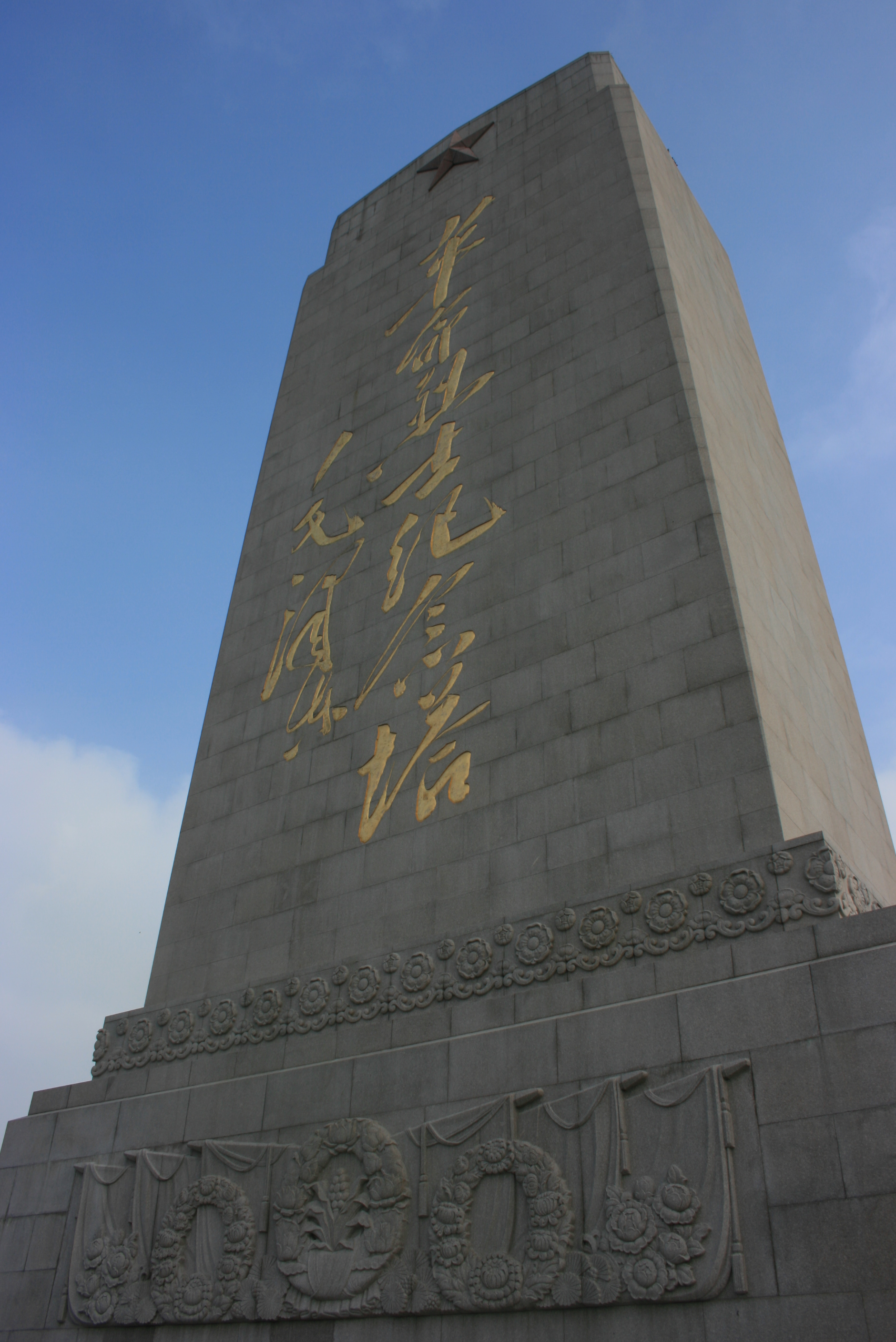
Monument for the heroes of the battle on Hero Hill, Jinan.

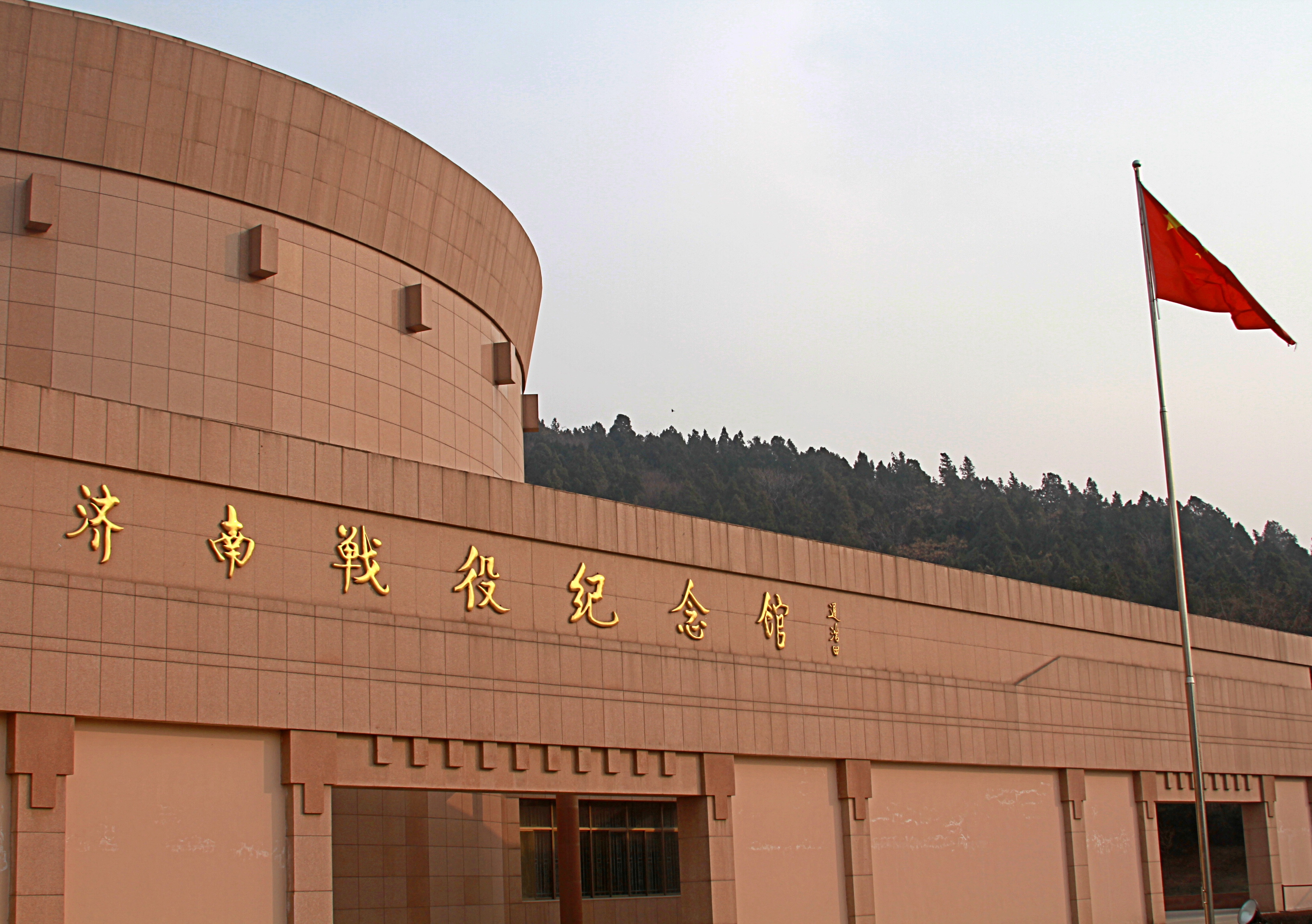
Memorial Hall for the battle on the foot of Hero Hill, Jinan.
