= Jinan Prefecture =

Historical administrative division in China

Jinan Prefecture 濟南府
- Prefecture of Imperial China
- 1116–1913
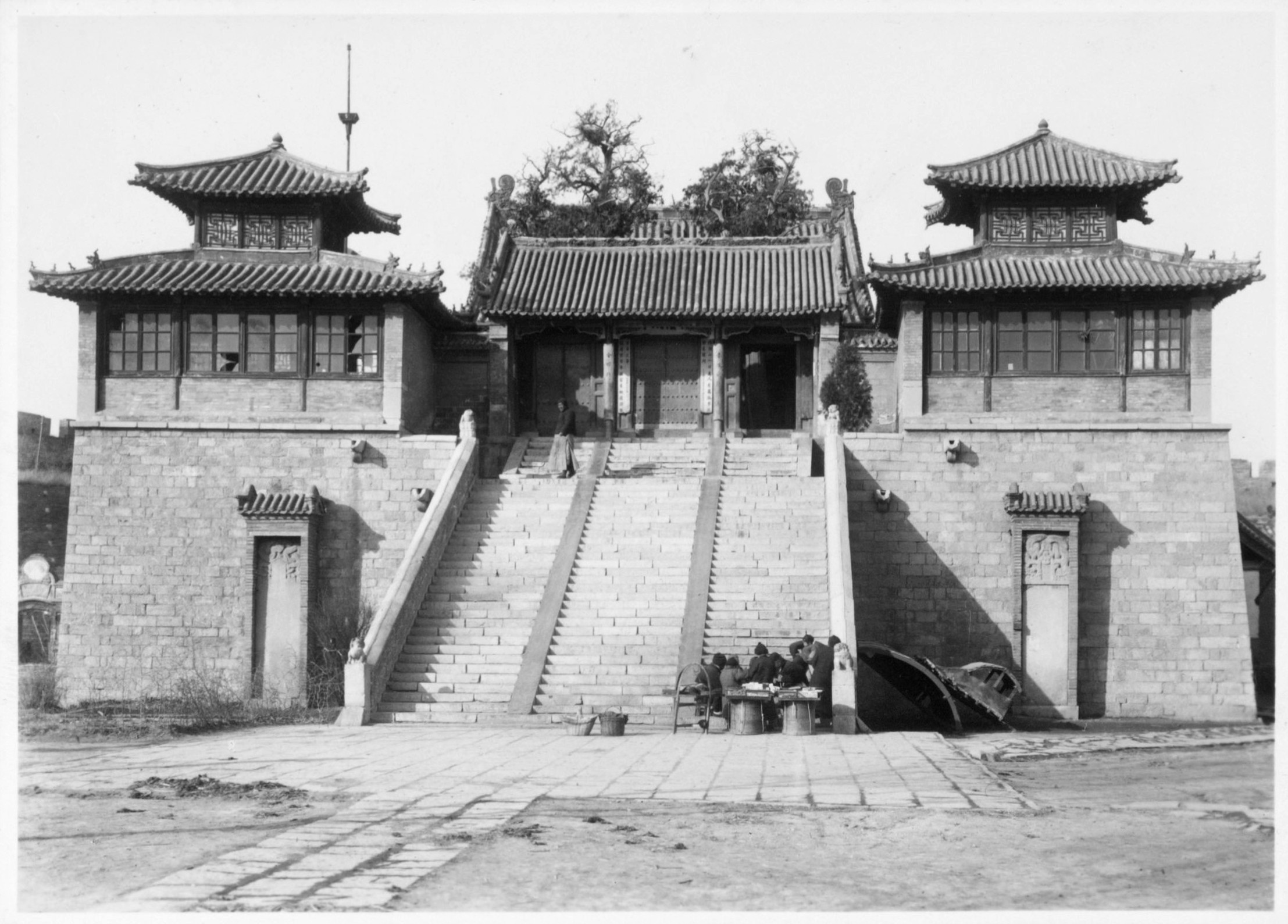
- Beiji Pavillion in the early 20th century

- Map of Jinan Fu with in Shandong Province in 1820
- History
  - Established: 1116
  - Disestablished: 1913
Preceded by	Succeeded by
Qi Prefecture (Shandong)	Jinan City
- Today part of: Jinan, Tai'an, Yucheng, Qihe, and Linyi

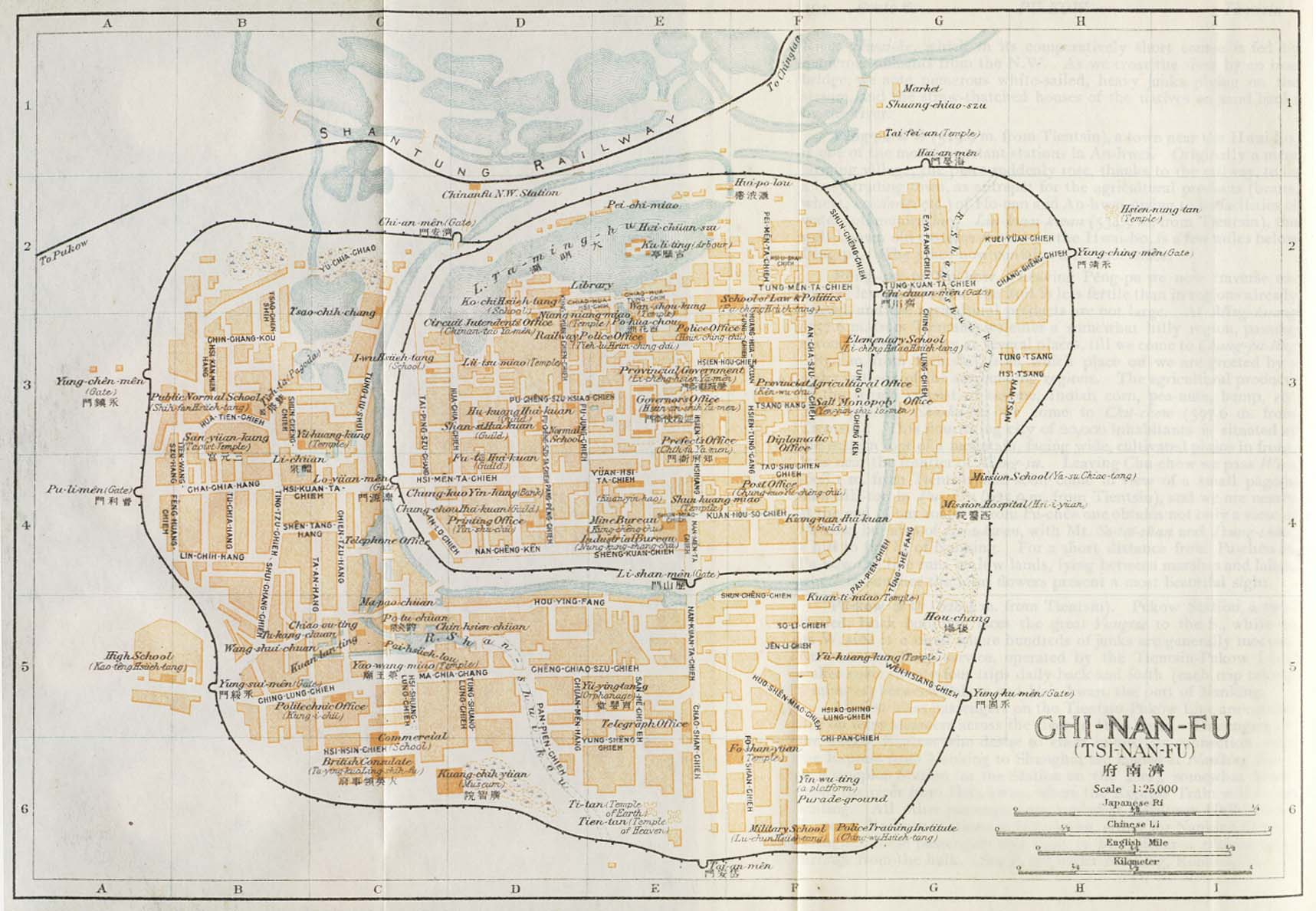
Map of city proper of Jinan in 1915, the office of Jinan Prefecture was labeled as "Prefect's Office (Chifu Yamen)" in the center

Jinan Prefecture (濟南府), historically romanized as Tsinanfu, was a fu (prefecture) that existed in central Shandong from 1116 to 1913, its administrative center was in today's Licheng, Jinan.

== History ==
In 1116, during Song dynasty, Qizhou was elevated to Jinan Prefecture, under the jurisdiction of Jingdong Eastern Circuit, poets like Xin Qiji and Li Qingzhao were born here. In later periods, Jinan Prefecture belonged to Shandong Eastern Circuit. At the beginning of the Yuan dynasty, it was reorganized as Jinan Route (Jinan Lu). Near the end of the Yuan dynasty, Banyan Route was changed into Zichuan Directly-Administered Prefecture (Zichuan Zhili Zhou). In 1367, Zhu Yuanzhang restored it to a prefecture. Bohai County, Yanci County, Fengfu County, and Ande County were abolished, and their territories were placed under the direct jurisdiction of Binzhou, Dizhou, Tai’an Prefecture, and Dezhou.

After Ming was established, in 1369, Dezhou was changed from a directly-administered prefecture into a scattered prefecture (san-zhou), with Ling County placed under its administration; Zichuan Prefecture was downgraded to a county; Laiwu County was reassigned to Tai'an Prefecture; Putai County was reassigned to Binzhou; and Leling County to Dizhou. Qingcheng County was abolished and divided between Qidong County and Zouping County.

In 1373, Dizhou was renamed Le'an Prefecture (Le'an Zhou). In 1375, Ling County was merged into Dezhou. In 1376, Zichuan County was elevated to a prefecture. In 1377, Zichuan Prefecture was again downgraded to a county; in the next year, the capital of Shandong was moved from Qingzhou to Jinan. Since then, Licheng county was the administrative seat of three levels of government—Licheng County, Jinan Prefecture, as well as Shandong Province, and this was known as attached county.

In 1724 during Qing dynasty, Tai'an Prefecture, Bin Prefecture, and Wuding Prefecture—previously under Jinan Prefecture—were elevated to directly-administered prefectures (直隸州), with the nine counties of Xintai, Laiwu, Changqing, Lijin, Zhanhua, Putai, Yangxin, Haifeng, and Leling placed under their supervision. In 1734, Qingcheng and Shanghe—previously under Jinan Prefecture—were reassigned to Wuding Prefecture, and Feicheng County was reassigned to Tai’an Prefecture, while Changqing, Pingyuan, Yucheng, Linyi, and Ling County, which had earlier been detached, remained under Jinan Prefecture.

After the Xinhai Revolution, imperial rule was replaced by Republic of China; in 1913, Jinan Prefecture was abolished.

== Divisions ==
Period	Total	Subordinate Units
Northern Song, 1116	Five counties	Licheng (歷城); Yucheng (禹城); Zhangqiu (章丘); Changqing (長清); Linyi (臨邑)
Jin dynasty	Seven counties and twenty-nine towns	Licheng (歷城); Linyi (臨邑); Qihe (齊河); Zhangqiu (章丘); Yucheng (禹城); Changqing (長清); Jiyang (濟陽); 29 towns
Ming dynasty, Jingtai era	Four subprefectures and twenty-six counties:	Subprefectures: Tai'an Subprefecture (泰安州): Xintai (新泰), Laiwu (萊蕪); Dezhou (德州): Deping (德平), Pingyuan (平原); Wuding Subprefecture (武定州): Yangxin (陽信), Haifeng (海豐), Leling (樂陵), Shanghe (商河); Binzhou (濱州): Lijin (利津), Zhanhua (霑化), Putai (蒲台); Counties: Licheng (歷城); Zhangqiu (章丘); Zouping (鄒平); Zichuan (淄川); Changshan (長山); Xincheng (新城); Qihe (齊河); Qidong (齊東); Jiyang (濟陽); Yucheng (禹城); Linyi (臨邑); Changqing (長清); Feicheng (肥城); Qingcheng (青城); Ling (陵)
Qing dynasty, Yongzheng era	One subprefecture and fifteen counties	Subprefecture: Dezhou (德州); Counties: Licheng (歷城); Zhangqiu (章丘); Zouping (鄒平); Zichuan (淄川); Changshan (長山); Xincheng (新城); Qihe (齊河); Qidong (齊東); Jiyang (濟陽); Yucheng (禹城); Linyi (臨邑); Changqing (長清); Ling (陵); Deping (德平); Pingyuan (平原)
