= Qi Prefecture (Shandong) =

Historical administrative division in Shandong, China

Qi Prefecture 齊州
- Prefecture of Imperial China
- 469–1116
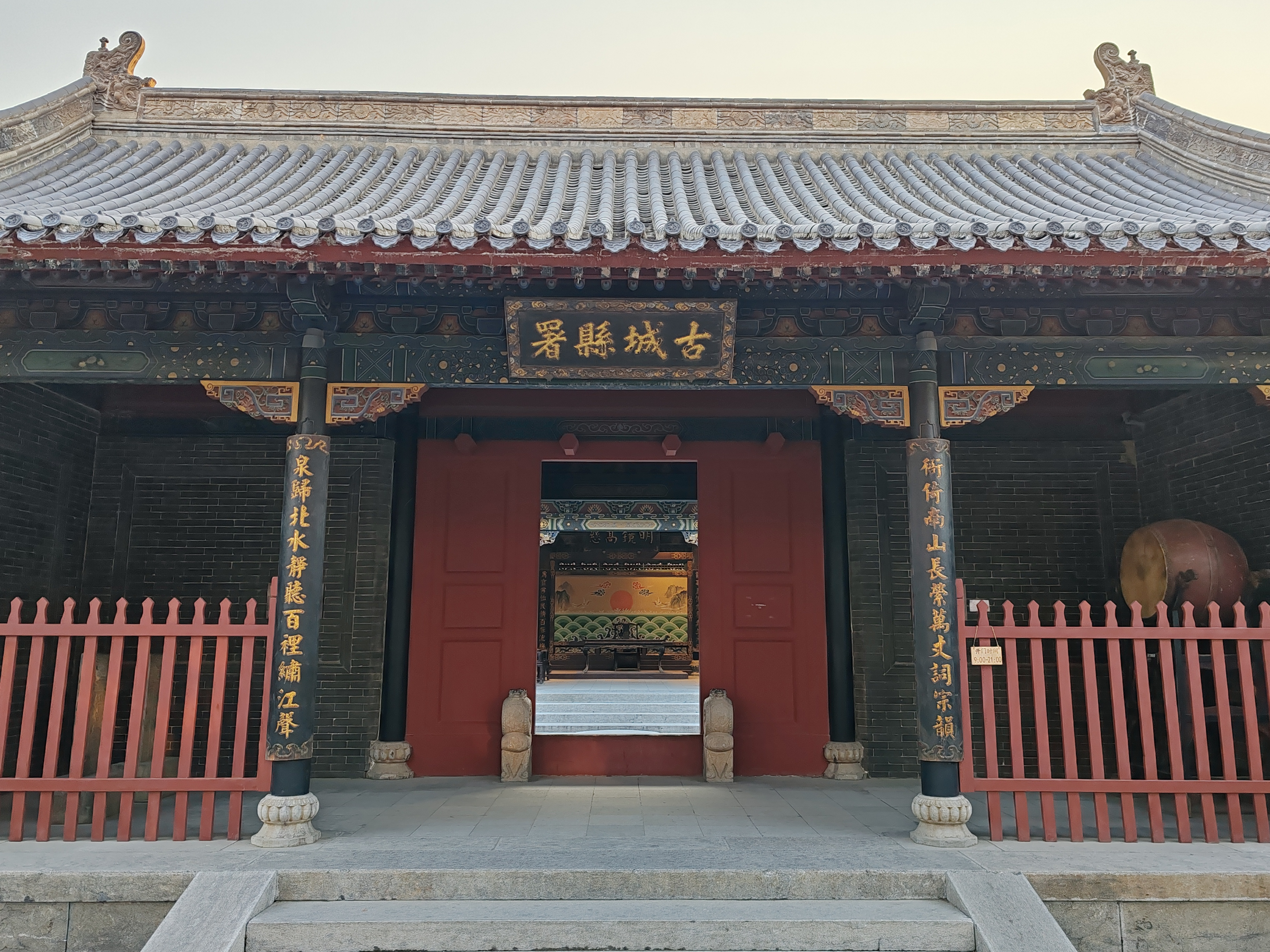
- Office of Zhangqiu County, a county under the jurisdiction of Qi Prefecture since the 6th century

- Map of Jinan Fu with in Shandong Province in 1820
- History
  - Established: 469
  - Disestablished: 1116
Preceded by	Succeeded by
Jinan Commandery	Jinan Prefecture
- Today part of: Jinan, Yucheng, Qihe, and Linyi

Qizhou or Qi Prefecture (Chinese: 齊州) was a zhou (prefecture) in imperial China centering on modern Jinan, Shandong, China. It existed (intermittently) from 469 until 1116. Its jurisdiction roughly corresponded to the area of modern-day Jinan, Zhangqiu, Jiyang, Yucheng, Qihe, and Linyi in Shandong Province.

== History ==
In 469 under the Northern Wei dynasty, Jizhou (冀州) was reorganized as Qizhou (齊州), with its administrative seat located in Licheng County (歷城縣), which is present-day Jinan, Shandong. Qi Prefecture got its name of the state of Qi which used to exist in this area in the Spring and Autumn period.

In the early years of the Sui dynasty, it was renamed Qi Commandery (齊郡, Qijun). In 618, it was again changed back to Qizhou. In Tang dynasty, it was famous of production such as silk, kudzu fiber, silk fabrics, and cotton. The prefecture recorded 62,485 households and 365,972 inhabitants. It administered six counties:

- Licheng (歷城)
- Zhangqiu (章丘)
- Linyi (臨邑)
- Linji (臨濟)
- Changqing (長清)
- Yucheng (禹城)

In 1116, during the Zhenghe era of Northern Song dynasty, it was elevated to Jinan Prefecture.
