= Wande, Shandong =

Wande 万德镇
- Town
- Location in Shandong Wande (China)
- Coordinates: 36°20′06″N 116°55′24″E
- Country: People's Republic of China
- Province: Shandong
- Sub-provincial city: Jinan
- District: Changqing
- Time zone: UTC+8 (China Standard)
- Area code: 0531

Wande (simplified Chinese: 万德; traditional Chinese: 萬德; pinyin: Wàndé) is a town in Changqing District, in the southern reaches of Jinan City, Shandong, China, located along G3 Beijing–Taipei Expressway. As of 2011, it has one residential community (社区) and 75 villages under its administration. The eastern part of the town abuts the Mount Tai massif, and the town is about 30 kilometres (19 mi) south of the main urban area of Jinan and around 20 km (12 mi) northwest of Tai'an.
