= Xiaoli, Shandong =

Xiaoli 孝里镇
- Town
- Location in Shandong Xiaoli (China)
- Coordinates: 36°24′01″N 116°36′08″E
- Country: People's Republic of China
- Province: Shandong
- Sub-provincial city: Jinan
- District: Changqing
- Elevation: 51 m (167 ft)
- Time zone: UTC+8 (China Standard)
- Area code: 0531

Xiaoli (Chinese: 孝里; pinyin: Xiàolǐ) is a town in southwestern Changqing District, Jinan, Shandong, People's Republic of China, located around 2 kilometres (1.2 mi) southeast of the Yellow River. As of 2011, it has 57 villages under its administration.

== See also ==
- List of township-level divisions of Shandong
