= Baimai Springs =

Karst springs in Jinan, Shandong, China

Coordinates: 36°43′12″N 117°32′11″E

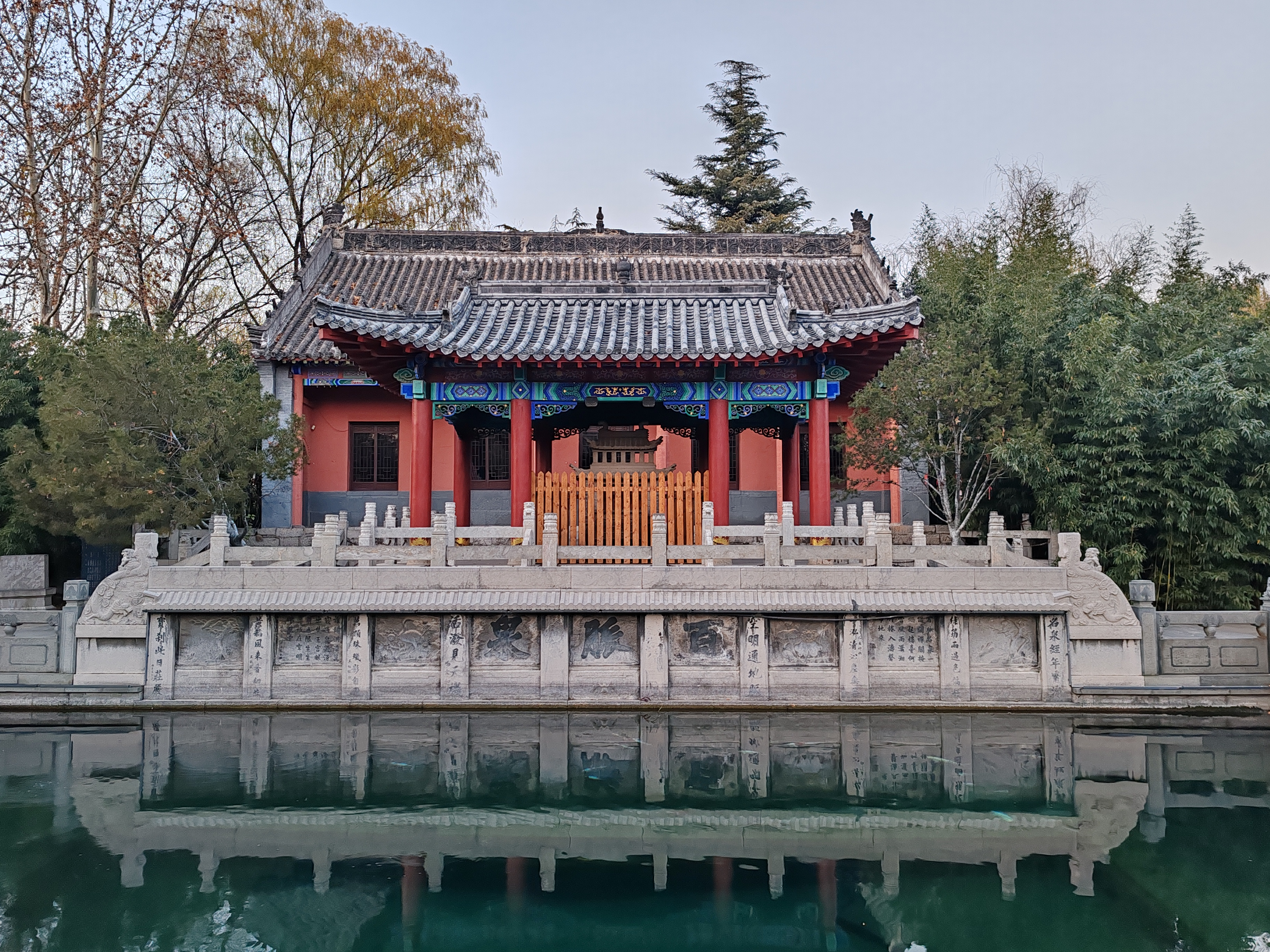
Baimai Springs

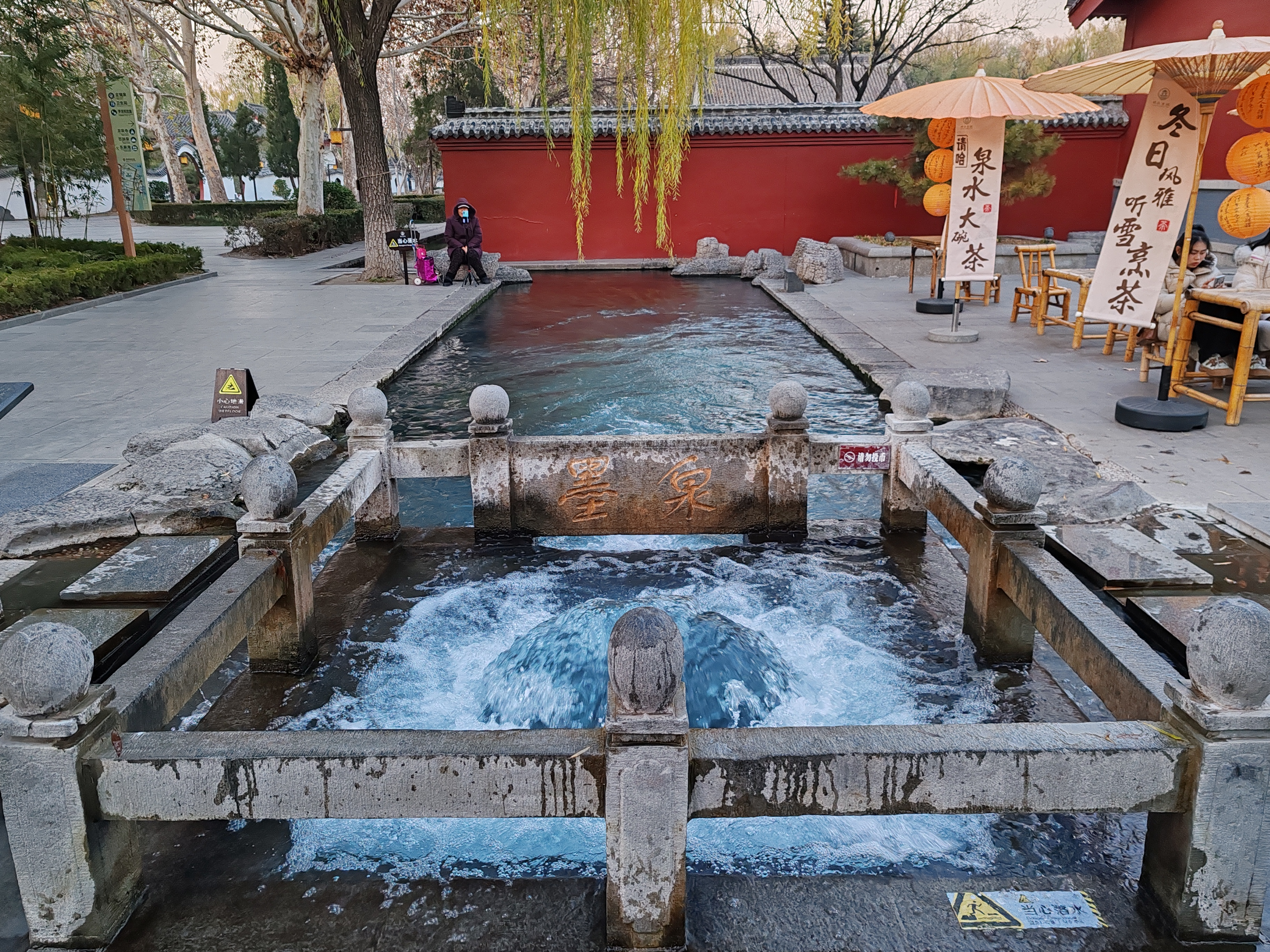
Mo Spring (Chinese: 墨泉; pinyin: Mò Quán), surrounded by a stone hand rail inscribed by calligrapher Shu Tong

The Baimai Springs (simplified Chinese: 百脉泉; traditional Chinese: 百脈泉; pinyin: Bǎimài Quán) are a group of artesian karst springs located in Mingshui Subdistrict, Zhangqiu District, Jinan, Shandong Province, China, about 25 kilometres west from the city centre of Jinan. The site of the springs is renowned for its natural beauty and as the one-time residence of the female Song dynasty poet Li Qingzhao.

The Baimai Spring proper is located in the courtyard of the Dragon Spring Temple (龙泉寺; Lóngquán Sì). Its spring pool covers a rectangular area of 25 by 14.5 metres and has a depth of 2 metres. The springs and the historical buildings that surround them are part of a public park (Baimai Spring Park, 百脉泉公园; Bǎimàiquán Gōngyuán). The park was established in 1985 and covers an area of 25 hectares. Besides the springs, it also contains some small lakes, such as Wanquan Lake (万泉湖; Wànquán Hú, literally "10,000 Springs Lake") that are fed by the springs. Within the park, the Qingzhao Ci Poetry Garden is laid out according to the aesthetic principles of ci poetry with the four romantic themes: wind, flowers, snow, and moon.

== Springs in the group ==
- Baimai Spring (百脉泉; Bǎimài Quán)
- Dongmawan Spring (东麻湾泉; Dōngmáwān Quán)
- Mo Spring (墨泉; Mò Quán, literally "Black Ink Spring")
- Plum Blossom Spring (梅花泉; Méihuā Quán)

== Location ==
The street address of the park is Number 31 Huiquan Road, Mingshui, Zhangqiu, Shandong, China.

== See also ==
- List of sites in Jinan
