= Xinshi, Shandong =

Xinshi 新市镇
- Town
- Location in Shandong Xinshi (China)
- Coordinates: 37°04′48″N 117°00′32″E
- Country: People's Republic of China
- Province: Shandong
- Sub-provincial city: Jinan
- County: Jiyang
- Village-level divisions: 77 villages
- Elevation: 19 m (62 ft)
- Time zone: UTC+8 (China Standard)
- Area code: 0531

Xinshi (Chinese: 新市; pinyin: Xīnshì) is a town in Jiyang County in northwestern Shandong province, China, located about 18 kilometres (11 mi) northwest of the county seat. As of 2011, it has 77 villages under its administration.

== See also ==
- List of township-level divisions of Shandong
