= Nanmengcun =

Village in Shandong, China

Coordinates: 36°54′52″N 117°21′09″E

Nanmengcun (Chinese: 南孟村) is a village in Zhangqiu District, Shandong, China. It is located on Highway S321, approximately 3 km east of Gaoguanzhai Town, 15 km (14 mi) northeast of Jinan Yaoqiang International Airport. The population of Nanmengcun is 985.
