= Li Qingzhao =

Chinese Song Dynasty poet

- 李清照
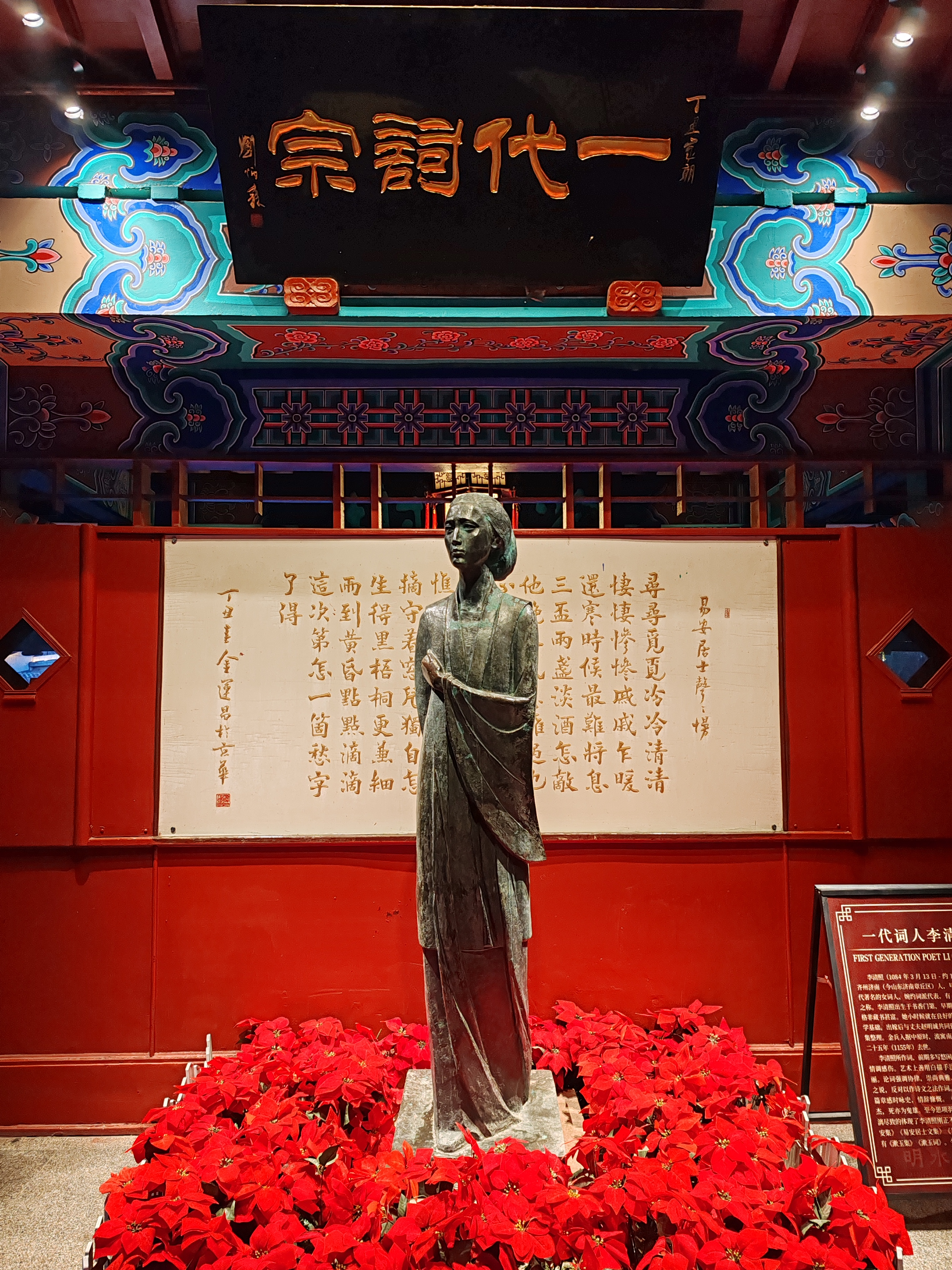
- Statue of Li Qingzhao in the Li Qingzhao Memorial, Zhangqiu District, Jinan
- Born: 1084; Zhangqiu County, Qi Prefecture, Northern Song
- Died: c. 1155; Shaoxing, Southern Song
- Occupations: Poet, essayist
- Notable work: Afterword to Catalogue of Inscriptions on Metal and Stone; Ci of Shuyü
- Spouses: Zhao Mingcheng; Zhang Ruzhou
- Parent: Li Gefei (father)

Chinese name
- Chinese: 李清照
Transcriptions
Standard Mandarin
- Hanyu Pinyin: Lǐ Qīngzhào
- Wade–Giles: Li Ch'ing-chao

Yi'an Jushi
- Chinese: 易安居士
Transcriptions
Standard Mandarin
- Hanyu Pinyin: Yì'ān Jūshì

Li Qingzhao (Chinese: 李清照; 1084 – ca. 1155), art name Yi'an Jushi (Chinese: 易安居士), was a Chinese poet and essayist of the Song dynasty. She is considered one of the greatest poets in Chinese history.

== Biography ==
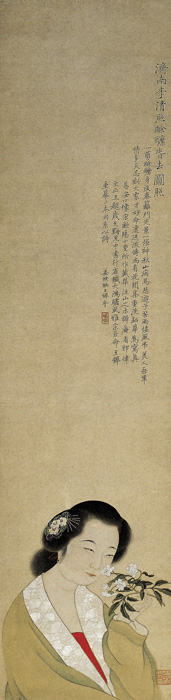
Li Qingzhao, painted by Qing dynasty painter Jiang Xun (1764-1821).

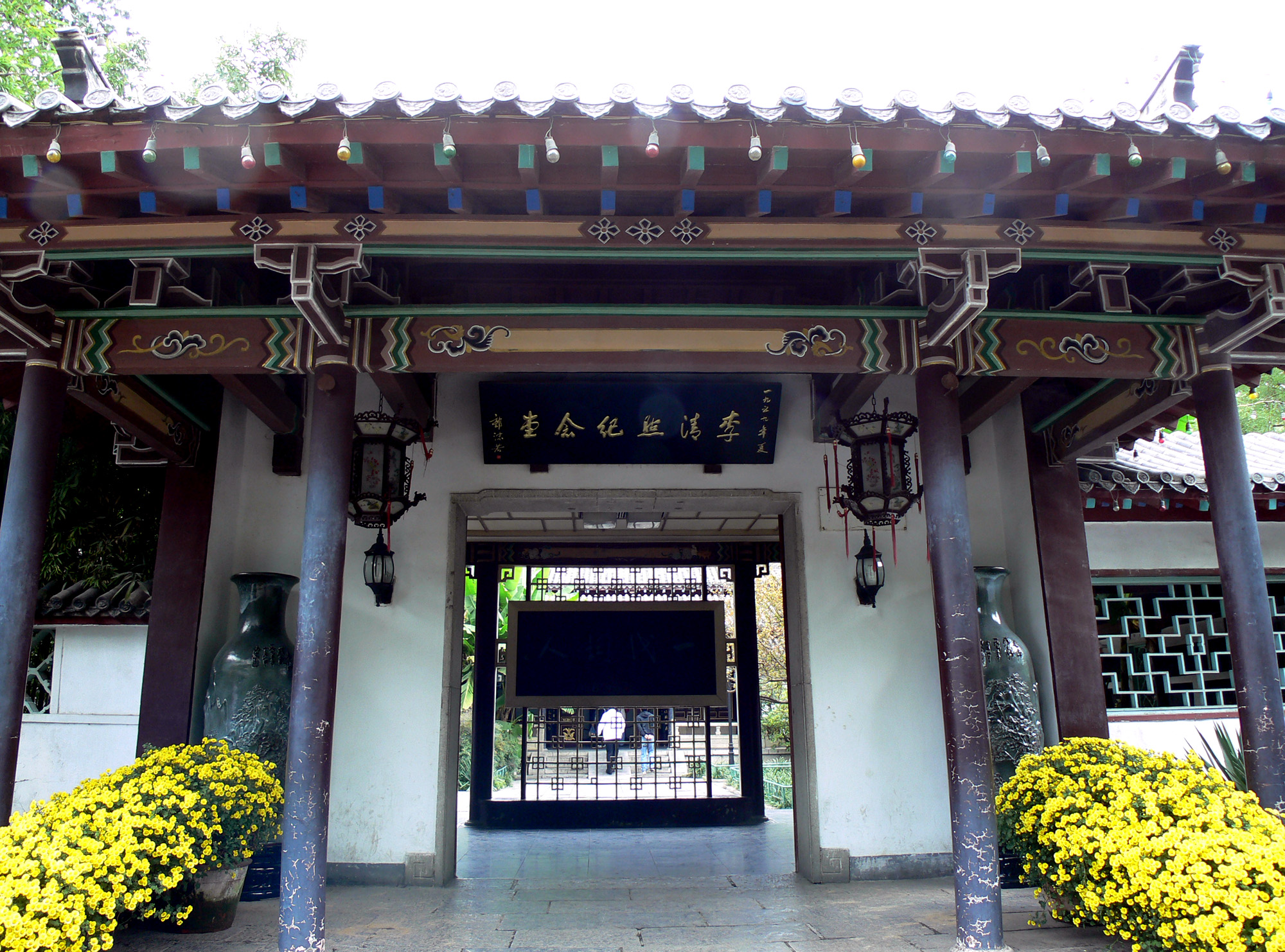
Li Qingzhao Memorial at Baotu Spring garden in Jinan

=== Early life ===
Li Qingzhao was born in 1084 in Qi Prefecture, Jingdong East Circuit (today's Zhangqiu, Shandong province). She was born to a family of scholar-officials. Her father, Li Gefei, was an academic professor, a famous essayist, and a member of a poetry and literary circle led by Su Shi. Her mother was a renowned poet descended from prime minister Wang Kung-ch'en. The family had a large collection of books, and Li was able to receive comprehensive education in her childhood. Her poems showed her girlish innocence, sharp mind, and love of nature, such as "Happy Memories: Dreamland". Since she was a teen, she studied hard and had an in-depth understanding of literature. As a teenager, she started to develop a career as a poet by writing two poems in shi form to rhyme with a poem by a friend.

=== Marriage ===
Li's poetry was already well known within elite circles by 1101, when, aged eighteen, she married Zhao Mingcheng. They had numerous similarities and both loved poetry, literature, sculpture in bronze and stone, painting, and calligraphy. After her husband started his official career, he was often absent from home. They were not particularly wealthy but enjoyed collecting inscriptions and calligraphy. Since Li spent a quite happy time with her husband, her poetic style became calmer and more elegant. Li and her husband collected many books. They often wrote poems for each other as well as about bronze artifacts of the Shang and Zhou dynasties. Her early poetry portrays her carefree days as a woman of high society, and is marked by its elegance.

Unfortunately, their marital bliss was only temporary because of the Jin-Song wars between the Song dynasty and the Jurchens. The Northern Song capital of Kaifeng fell in 1127. Fighting took place in Shandong and their house was burned. Citizens of Zhao country, including Li and Zhao, endured countless sufferings and fled south of the Yangtze River. The couple took many of their possessions when they fled to Nanjing, where they lived for a year. Zhao died of typhoid fever in 1129 on the route to an official post, and Li never recovered. She wandered aimlessly after her husband's death. It was then up to her to keep safe what was left of their collection. Li described her married life and the turmoil of her flight in an afterword to her husband's posthumously published work, Catalogue of Inscriptions on Metal and Stone.

=== Later life ===
Li subsequently settled in Hangzhou, where the Song government made its new capital after the war against the Jurchens. During this period, she continued writing poetry but her later work was full of nostalgic memories of her husband and her hometown. She also kept working on completing the Catalogue of Inscriptions on Metal and Stone. The book was mainly about the calligraphy on bronze and stones; it also mentions the documents Li and Zhao collected and viewed. According to some contemporary accounts, she was briefly married to a man named Zhang Ruzhou who treated her badly, and she divorced him within months. She survived the criticism of this marriage. It is widely believed that she died around the age of 71, but no records of this remain. Scholars note that this change in tone was closely related to the historical turmoil of the Song–Jin wars and Li Qingzhao's repeated displacement in her later years. The loss of her husband and their shared collections further deepened the sense of sorrow and nostalgia in her ci poetry.

Unfortunately, many of her poems disappeared in the following turbulent years, which Wang characterizes as "an irreparable loss to Chinese literature". Only around a hundred of her poems are known to survive, mostly in the ci form and tracing her varying fortunes in life. A few poems in the shi form, which follows stricter formal rules, also survived, as did the afterword to Catalogue of Inscriptions on Metal and Stone and a study of ci poetry.

== Poems ==
Many readers may not be familiar with the difference between shi poetry and ci poetry. Shi poetry usually follows strict structural rules and often focuses on public themes such as politics or history. Ci poetry, by contrast, is written according to musical patterns and allows more personal and emotional expression, including love, longing, and private feelings. This poetic form was especially suitable for Li Qingzhao and became the main style of her most famous works.

Li's life was full of twists and turns and her poems can be split into two main parts—the dividing line being when she moved to the south. During the early period, most of her poems were related to her feelings as a maiden. They were more like love poems. After her move to the south, they were closely linked with her hatred of the war against the Jurchens and her patriotism. She is credited with the first detailed critique of the metrics of Chinese poetry. She was regarded as a master of the "subtle and concise style" zh:婉約派.

One of Li's famous ci poems is "A Dream Song" (simplified Chinese: 如梦令; traditional Chinese: 如夢令; pinyin: Rú Mèng Lìng), written when she was living in Jinan and recalling the events of her hometown before her marriage. Therefore, she wrote it between the ages of 16 and 17 (the second year of Yuan Fu of Song Zhezong, 1099). This is also known as her first poem:

Chinese
《如梦令·常记溪亭日暮》

常记溪亭日暮，
沉醉不知归路。
兴尽晚回舟，
误入藕花深处。
争渡，争渡，惊起一滩鸥鹭。

English (translated by Jiaosheng Wang)

It was a day at Brookside pavilion
That I often fondly remember,
When, flushed with wine
We could hardly tear ourselves away
From the beautiful view of sunset.
Returning late by boat
When we'd enjoyed our fill,
We got lost and strayed
To where the clustered lotuses
Were at their thickest.
Pushing and thrashing,
Pushing and thrashing as best we could,
We scared into flight
A shoreful of dozing egrets and gulls.

Another representative poem is "Late night wind howled with light shower":

Chinese
《如梦令·昨夜雨疏风骤》

昨夜雨疏风骤，
浓睡不消残酒。
试问卷帘人，
却道海棠依旧。
知否，知否？
应是绿肥红瘦。

English (translated by Jiaosheng Wang)

Last night there was intermittent rain, a gusty wind.
Deep sleep did not relieve me of
The last effect of wine.
I ask the maid rolling up the blinds,
But she replies: "The crab-apple is lovely as before."
"Don't you know?
"Oh, don't you know?
"The green should be plump and the red lean?"

== Memorial Halls in China ==
=== Shandong Zhangqiu Memorial Hall ===
"Qingzhao Garden" is located at the bank of Baimai Spring in Mingshui, covering 18,000 square meters, including 1,270 square meters of buildings, 1,500 square meters of water, and 10,000 square meters of green space. It was officially opened on May 1, 1997, and is the most significant memorial to Li.

=== Shandong Qingzhou Memorial Hall ===
Qingzhou Li Qingzhao Memorial Hall is located at the Yangxi Lake outside the west gate of Qingzhou Ancient City. It covers an area of about 630 square meters. The building faces south; there are tunnels in the entrance to the north, road east built, shun river building, west of the four pine pavilion, are of Qing dynasty architecture. At the end of the corridor is a quadrillion built in 1993; on the door, there is a well-known poet Xiao Lao writing tablet "Li Qingzhao Memorial Hall".

=== Shandong Jinan Memorial Hall ===
Jinan Li Qingzhao Memorial Hall is located in Baotu Spring Park, in a courtyard on the north side of Liuxu Spring, with 360 square meters. In the Northern Song dynasty, this courtyard was the courtyard of the Zhang family in Jinan. In the Jin dynasty, it was changed to Linquan Running. In the late Qing dynasty, it was changed to the ancestral temple of Ding Baozhen. In the early Qing dynasty, the poet Tian Wen wrote a poem titled "Visiting Li Yian Old House at Liuxu Spring." People mistakenly thought that Li's former residence was near Liuxu Spring. Later, literati and poets all joined the club. Thus it was said that Li's old house was in Jinan. Moreover, Li was once respected as the lotus root god and was enshrined in the Lotus Shrine beside Daming Lake in Jinan. Since the Qing dynasty, Jinan people have been awarded Li "Lotus Godness" for sacrificing.

=== Zhejiang Jinhua Memorial Hall ===
Jinhua Li Qingzhao Memorial Hall is located in the southern corner of Jinhua City, Bayong Road. Ba Yong Lou was built by Shen Yue, governor of Dongyang, in the first year of Qilongchang in the Southern dynasty. In 1994, Ba Yong Lou Cultural Relics Conservation and Management Office changed the main hall of Ba Yong Lou into Li Qingzhao Memorial Hall.

=== Zhejiang Hangzhou Memorial Hall ===
Since Li Qingzhao once lived near Qingbo Gate of West Lake in Hangzhou, the relevant authorities built the Qingzhao Pavilion in the Stream of the Metasequoia forest in the Willow Waves And Orioles Park, which was opened in 2002.

== Modern references ==
Two impact craters, Li Ch'ing-Chao on Mercury and Li Qingzhao on Venus, are named after her.

In 2011, "A Dream Song" and "Sheng Sheng Man" have been set to music as part of the song cycle 'Chinese Memories' by composer Johan Famaey. In 2017, the composer Karol Beffa wrote Fragments of China (Klarthe), setting four of her poems to music. River of Stars, a novel by Guy Gavriel Kay set in a fictionalized Song China, features a protagonist inspired by Li Qingzhao, as acknowledged by the author in the book. In the 2022 video game Terra Invicta, the leader of the Academy faction is named in honor of Li Qingzhao.

=== Film, TV, and Opera ===
- 1981 Li Qingzhao, movie with Xie Fang in the title role
- 1988 TV series Li Qingzhao played by Liu Xuehua
- 1992 Yue Opera TV series People are thinner than yellow flowers, with Fu Quanxiang
- 1992 TV series Li Qingzhao played by Li Lan
- 2003 Yue Opera TV series Li Qingzhao, with Zhou Liuping
- 2006 Huangmei Opera TV series Li Qingzhao, with Sun Juan
- 2008 Yue Opera TV series Li Qingzhao, with He Ying
- 2016 Peking Opera TV series Li Qingzhao, with Shi Yihong
- 2020 TV series Qingfeng Mingyue Beauty, with Han Zaifen
- 2022 TV documentary China, Season 2, played by Jin Mengjia

== English Editions ==
- Li Ch’ing-chao (1980), Li Ch'ing-chao: Complete Poems, translated by Rexroth, Kenneth; Chung, Ling, New Directions, ISBN 0811207455.
- Li Qingzhao (1989), The Complete Ci-poems of Li Qingzhao: A New English Translation (PDF), Sino-Platonic Papers (in English and Chinese), vol. 13, translated by Wang, Jiaosheng, University of Pennsylvania: Department of East Asian Languages and Civilizations.
- Li Qingzhao (2019), Shields, Anna M. (ed.), The Works of Li Qingzhao, Library of Chinese Humanities, translated by Egan, Ronald, Berlin: De Gruyter Mouton, doi:10.1515/9781501504518, ISBN 9781501504518, S2CID 235140832.
