= Yang Xin =

Yang Xin may refer to:

- Yang Xin (art historian) (1940–2020), Chinese art historian
- Yang Xin (politician) (born 1950), Chinese politician
- Yang Xin (footballer) (born 1994), Chinese footballer
- Yang Xin (murder victim), decapitated by Zhu Haiyang

== See also ==
- Yangxin (disambiguation)
