= Mount Liantai =

Mountain in Shandong, China

Coordinates: 36°26′26.22″N 116°55′54.42″E

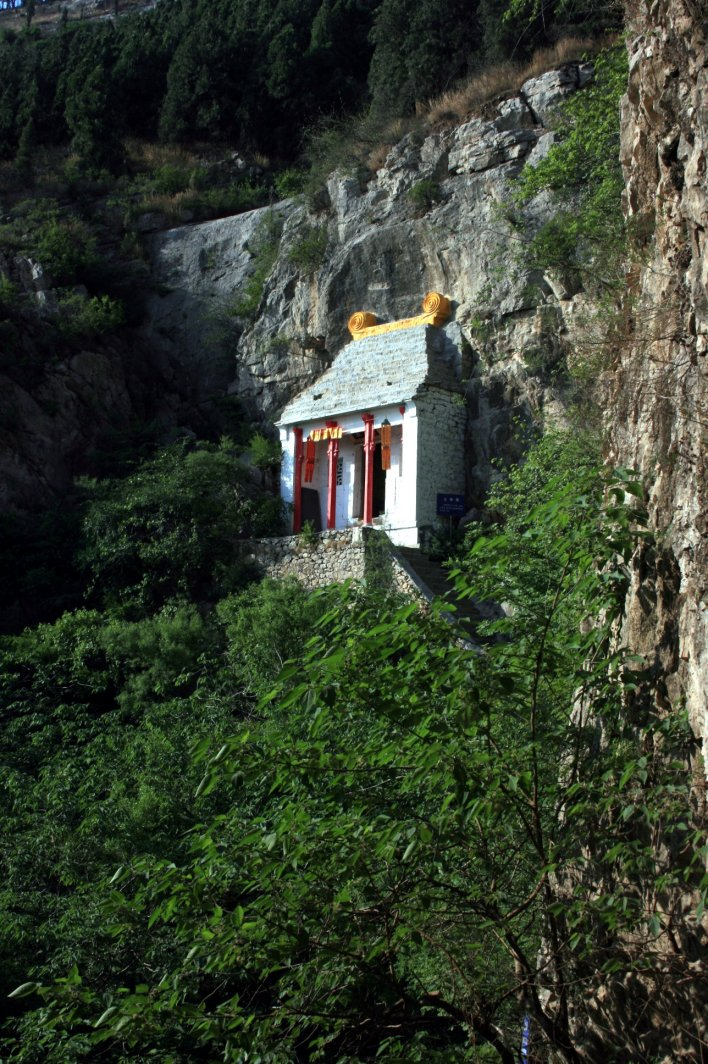
Small cliff-side temple on Mount Liantai.

Mount Liantai (Chinese: 莲台山; pinyin: Liántāi Shān; lit. 'Lotus Platform Mountain') is a mountain region located near Xia Village in the Changqing District of the City of Jinan, Shandong, China. The area is renowned for numerous caves of varying size and shape. The main cave (Touming cave) on Mount Liantai connects two opposite mountain slopes.
