= Great Wall of Qi =

Oldest existing Great Wall in China

Coordinates: 35°58′12.26″N 120°4′33.97″E

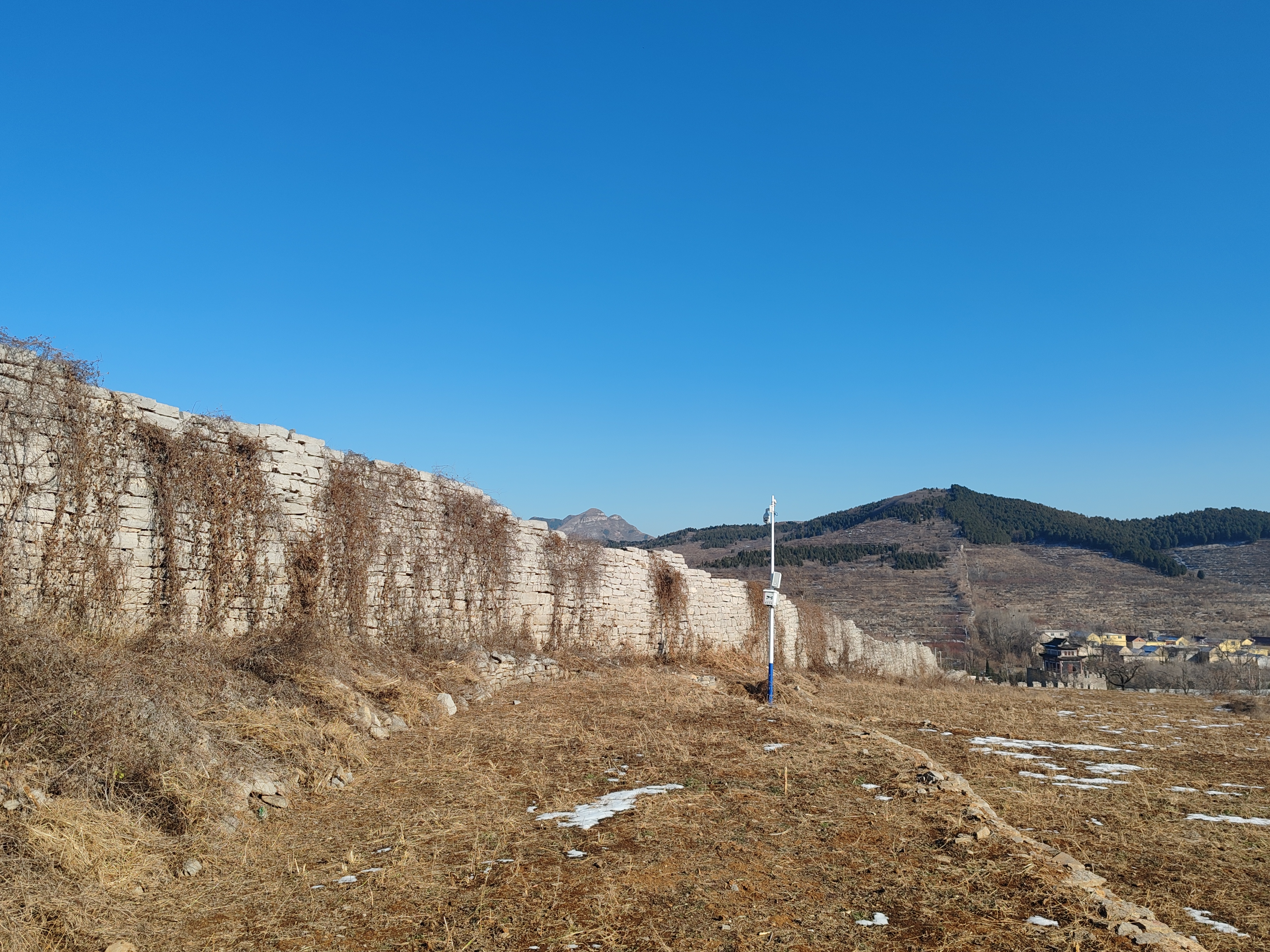
Part of Qi Great Wall between Laiwu and Licheng

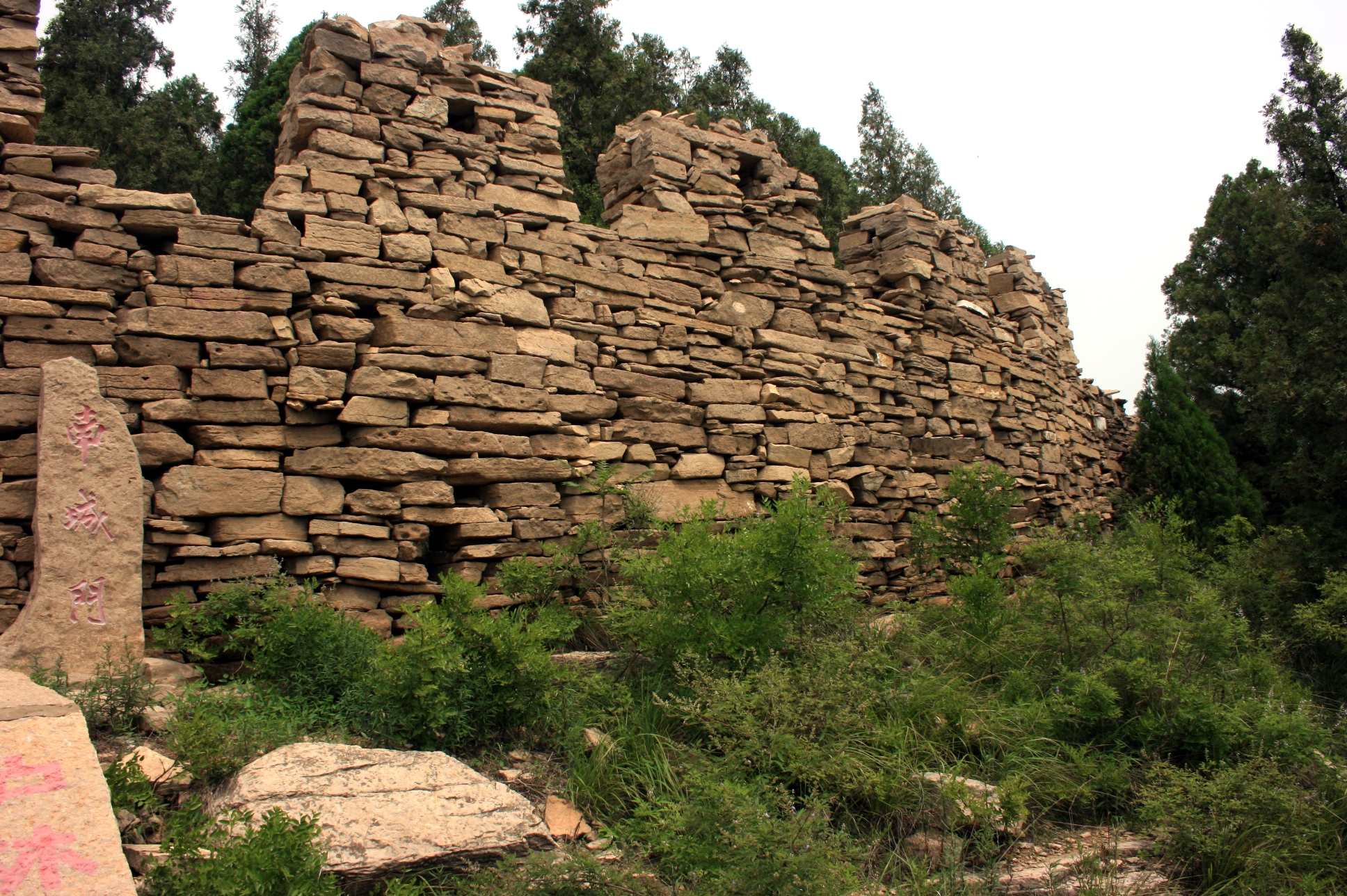
Remnants of the Great Wall of Qi on Dafeng Mountain, Changqing District, Jinan.

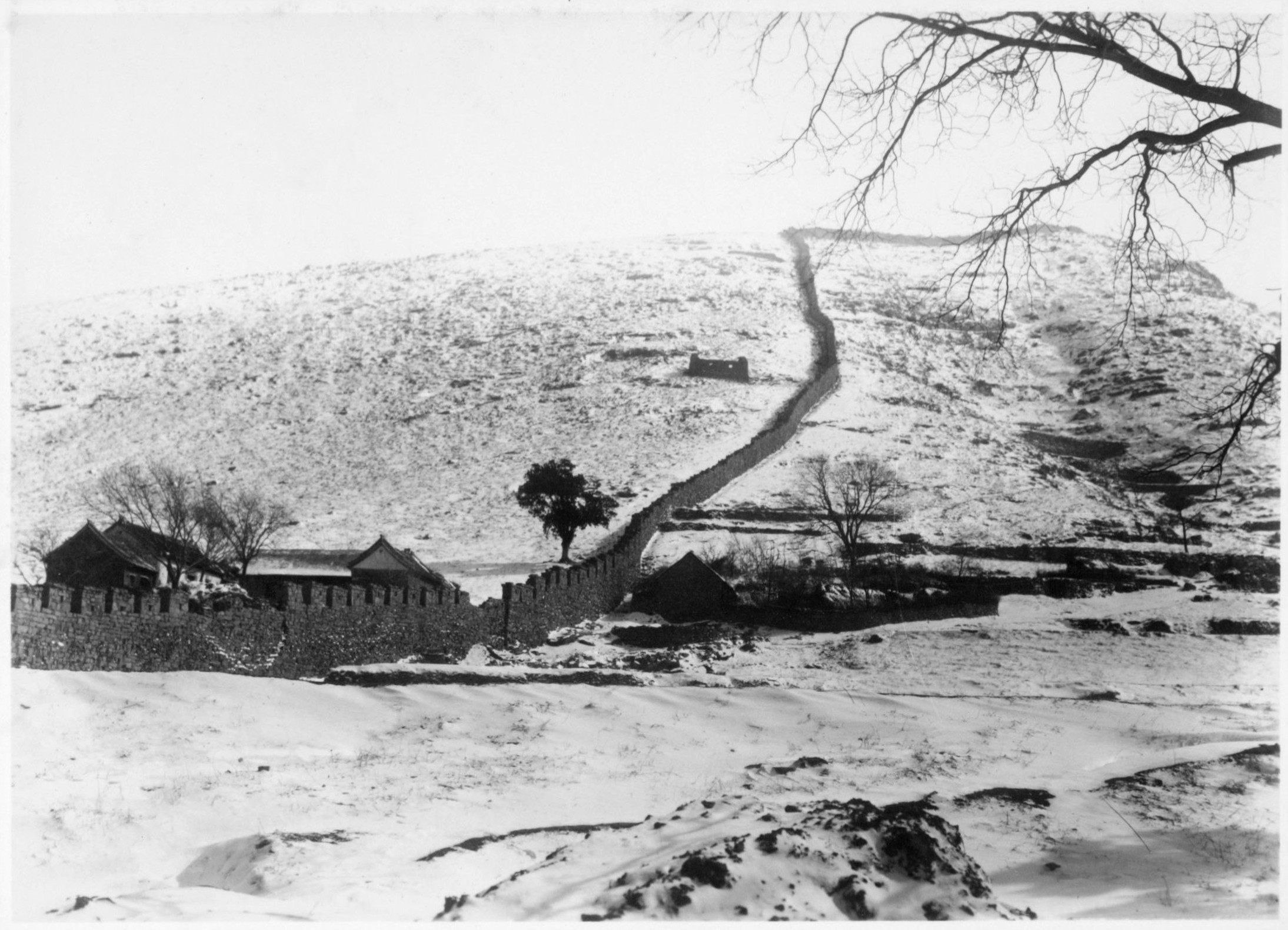
Great Wall of Qi near Boshan in the 1930s

The Great Wall of Qi (simplified Chinese: 齐长城; traditional Chinese: 齊長城; pinyin: Qí Chángchéng) is the oldest existing Great Wall in China. Textual records on bamboo state that construction of the wall started in 441 BC by the state of Qi, to defend itself against attacks from the states of Jin and Yue, although archeological discovery found the oldest parts of the wall were from an even earlier period. Construction ended during the Warring States period and became Qi's defense against enemy states like Ju, Lu, and Chu. The wall stretches from Guangli village of today's Changqing District, Jinan, running across the mountain ridges of central Shandong Province to the Yellow Sea in the present-day city of Qingdao. Its total length has been estimated at 600 kilometers. Large parts of the wall can still be seen.

== Dating ==
Before the discovery of the Tsinghua bamboo strips, several dates had been put forward as the date for the construction of the Great Wall of Qi. The earliest possible date is during the reign of Lord Huan of Qi (r. 685–643 BC) as mentioned in the Guanzi's "Qing zhong D" (輕重丁) chapter. However, the "Qing zhong" chapters of the Guanzi were in all likelihood composed no earlier than the Warring States period instead of the 7th century BCE work they purport to be, and thus could not be seen as a reliable historical source for the Spring and Autumn period centuries removed.

The next date is 555 BC, which comes from the Zuo zhuan describing a Jin invasion of Qi that year which involved a Qi fortification, claimed by the Shui Jing Zhu to be part of the Great Wall of Qi. The Zuo zhuan itself, however, never used the term "great wall" (長城 changcheng) or referred to other fortifications along Qi's southern border, throwing doubts into this identification.

The date 441 BC comes from the Xinian (繫年) collection of the Tsinghua bamboo strips, which were discovered from a Chu tomb in Hubei or Hunan and acquired by the Tsinghua University in 2008. Xinian was determined to be composed in the state of Chu no later than 370 BC, which puts it in good authority for the events it describes in its last four sections covering the period from 450 to 395 BC. Specifically, Xinian writes that Qi built the Great Wall "for the first time" after Zhao Huanzi (趙桓子) of Jin allied with the state of Yue to invade Qi. This date accords well with other records of battles happening along the wall in 404 BC, 365 BC, and 350 BC from the Bamboo Annals and inscriptions on the Piao Qiang bronze bells (𠫑羌鐘; discovered in Luoyang in 1928–1931).

In 2024, archaeologists dug up a section of the Qi Great Wall in the village of Guangli in Changqing district of Shandong, revealing the oldest parts of the wall were built during the Western Zhou dynasty (1046-771 BC).

== See also ==
- Great Wall of China
- List of sites in Jinan
