= Changqing, Jinan =

Changqing 长清区 Changtsing
- District
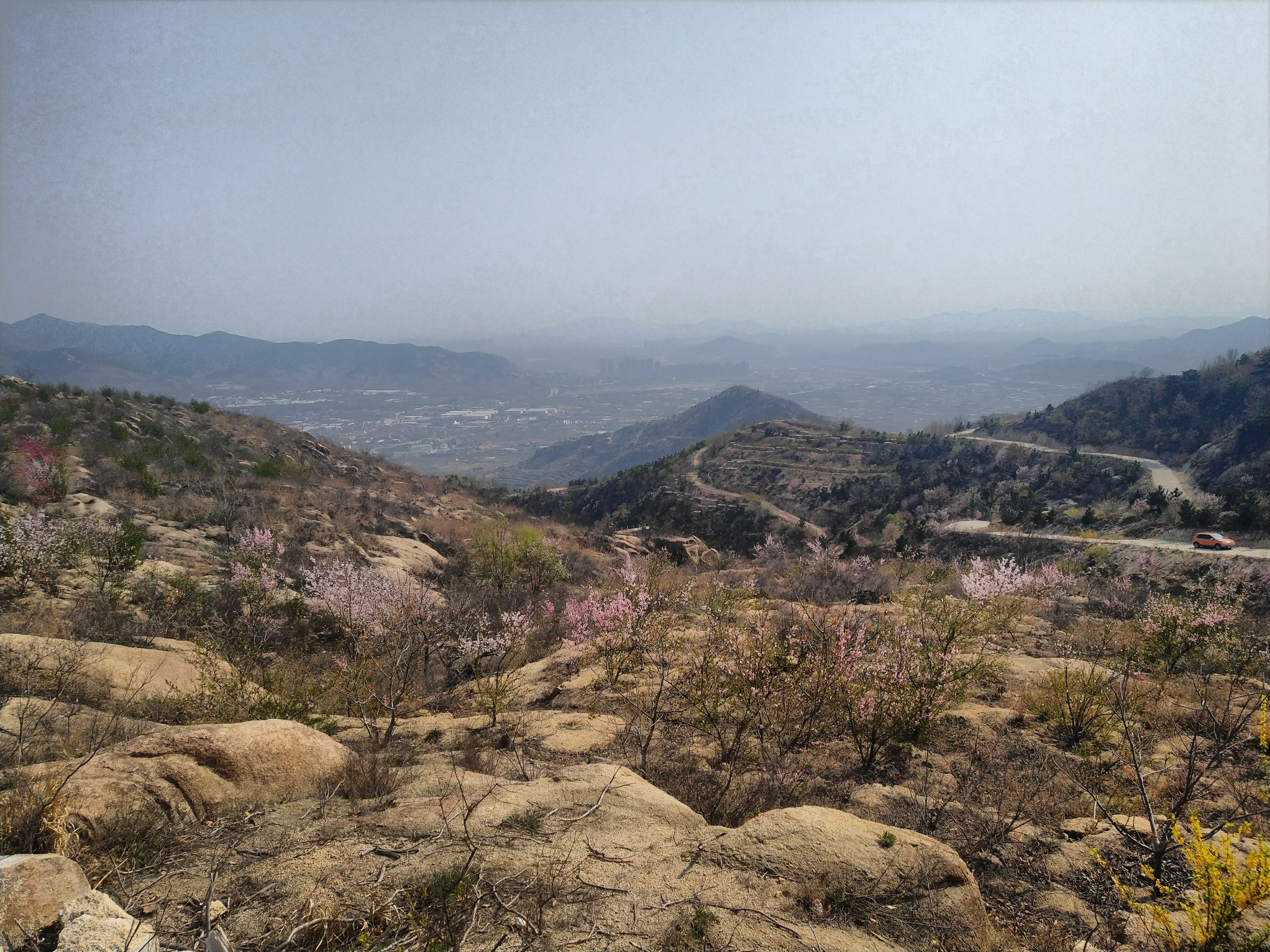
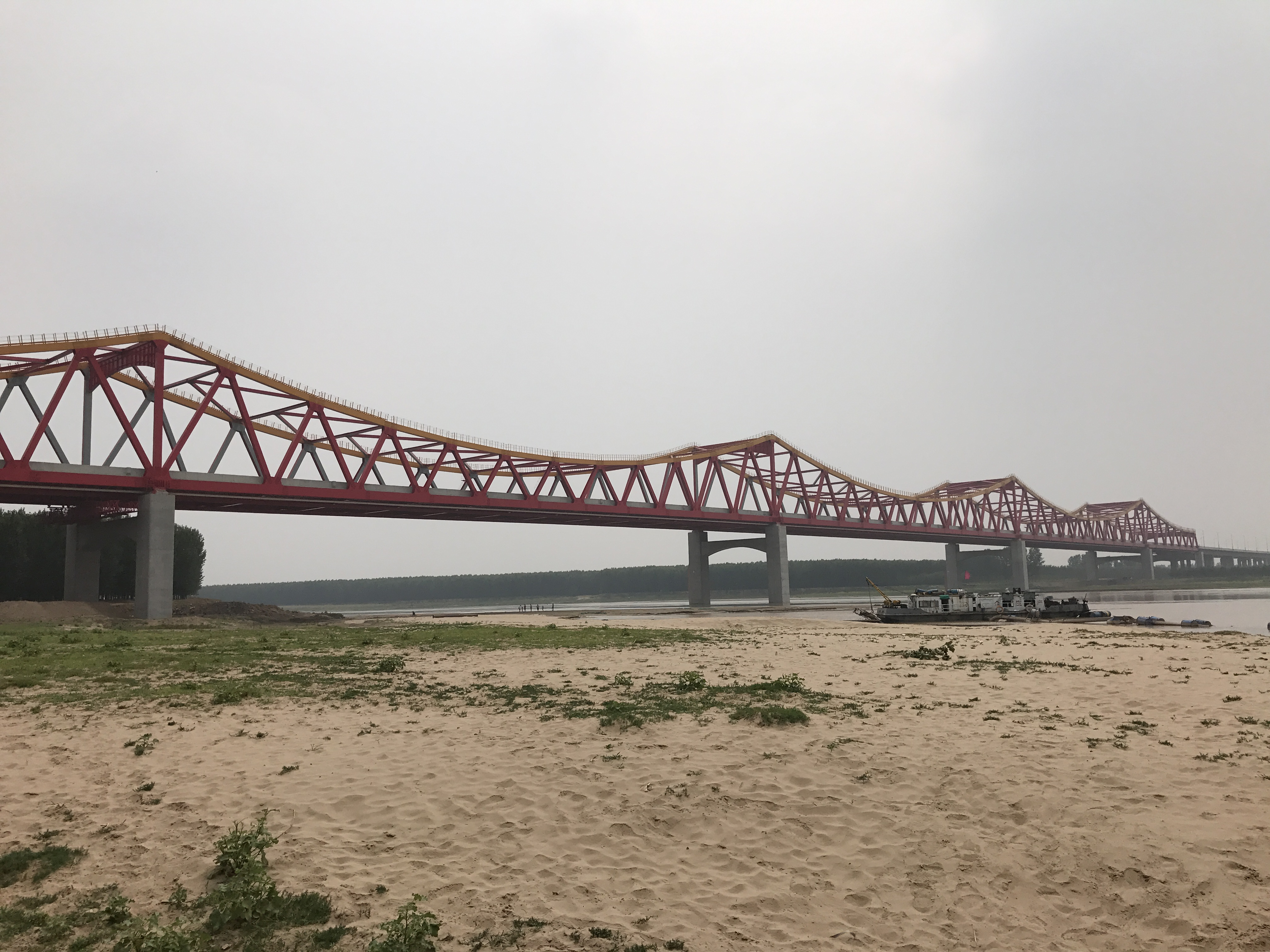
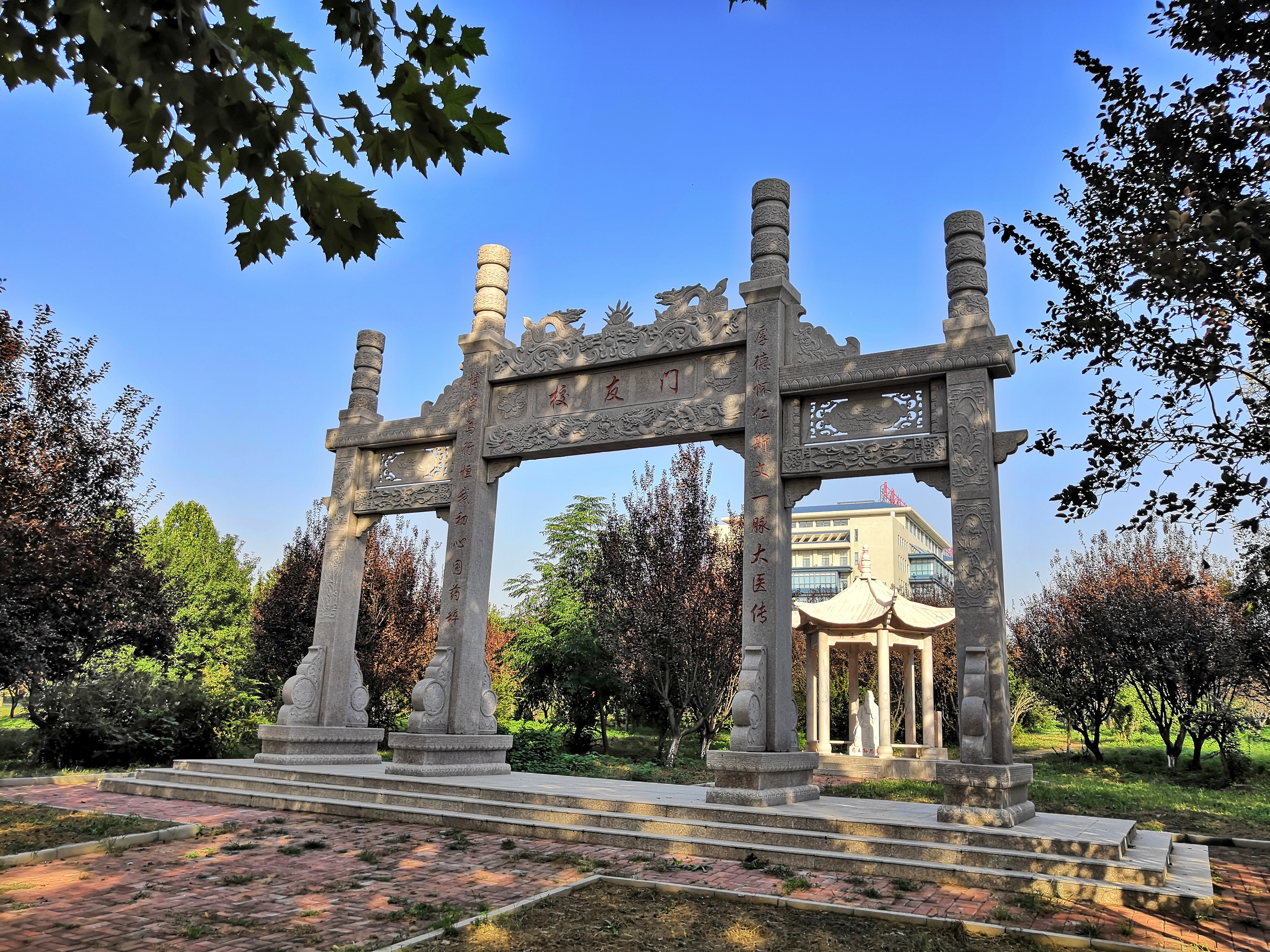
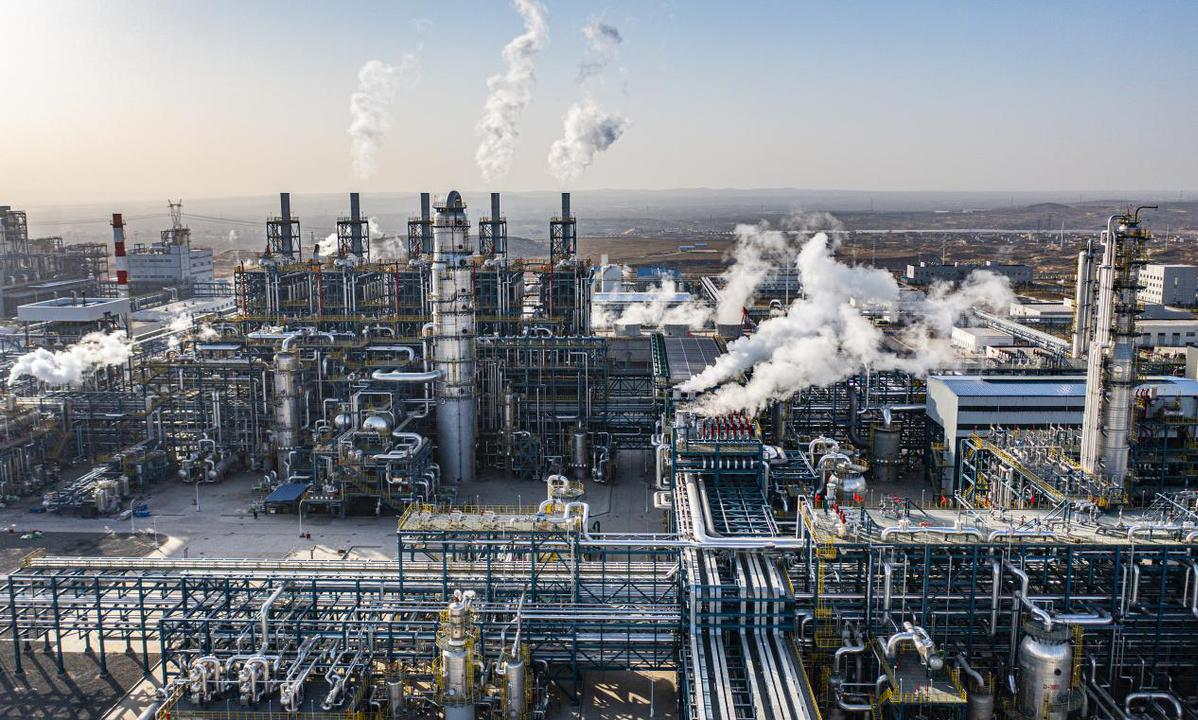
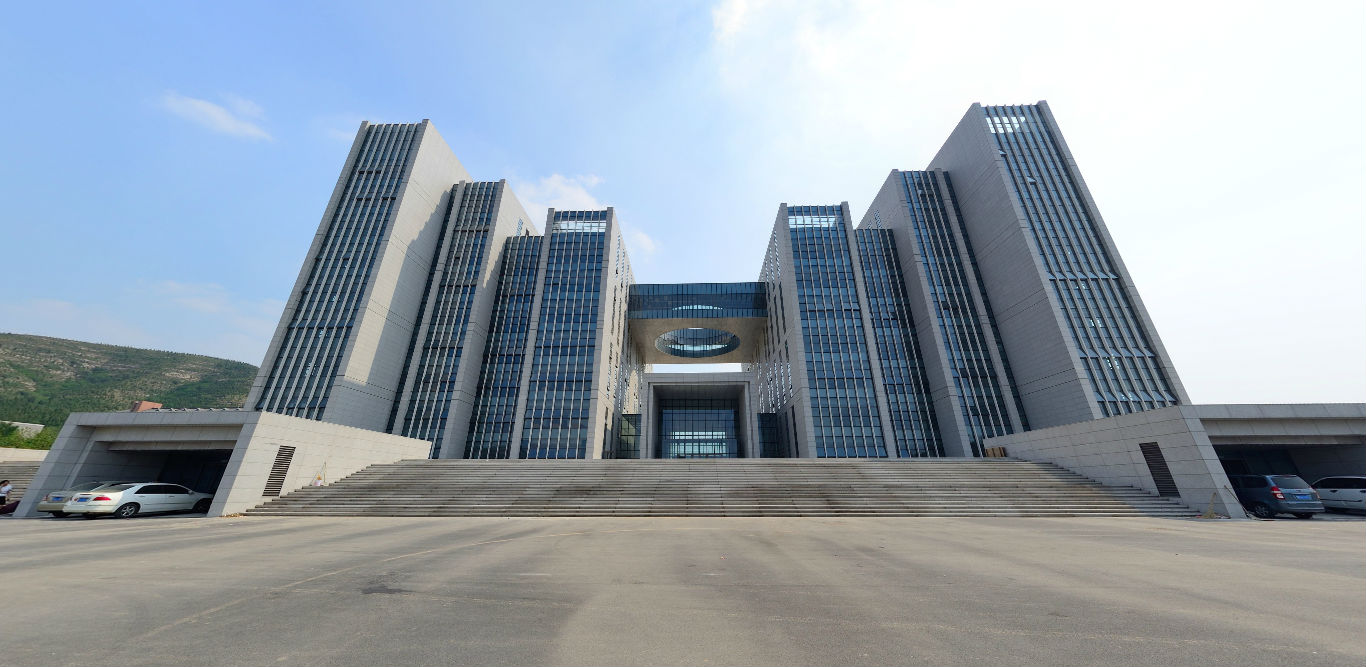
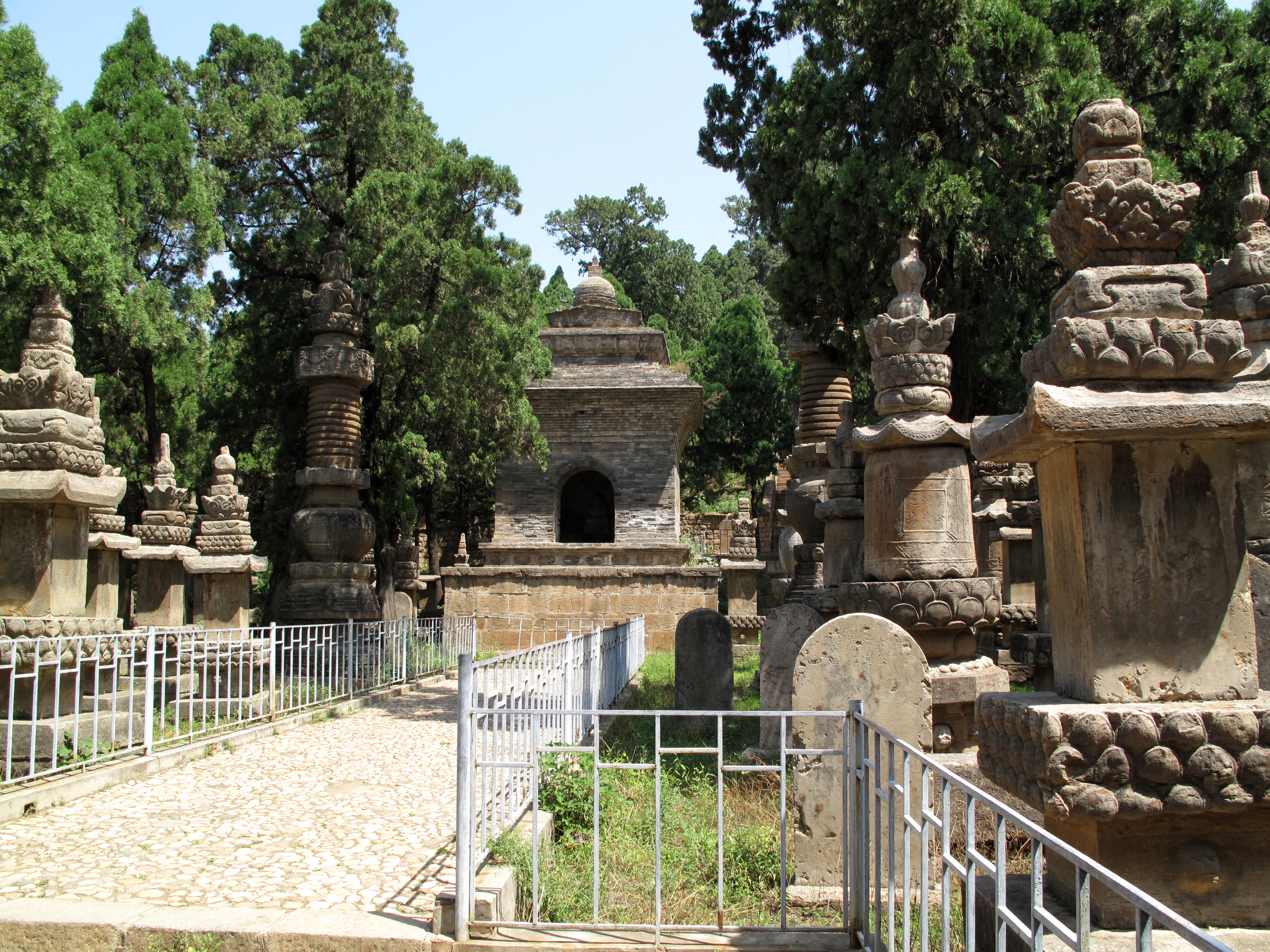
- Matao Mountain Changqing Yellow River Bridge Shandong University of Traditional Chinese Medicine Industrial Area Shandong Normal University Lingyan Temple

- Location in Shandong
- Coordinates: 36°33′23″N 116°45′15″E
- Country: People's Republic of China
- Province: Shandong
- Sub-provincial city: Jinan

Area
  - Total: 1,208.54 km^{2} (466.62 sq mi)

Population (2019)
  - Total: 598,400
  - Density: 495.1/km^{2} (1,282/sq mi)
- Time zone: UTC+8 (China Standard)
- Postal code: 250300

Changqing District (simplified Chinese: 长清区; traditional Chinese: 長清區; pinyin: Chángqīng Qū) is one of 10 urban districts of the prefecture-level city of Jinan, the capital of Shandong Province, East China, covering part of the southwestern suburbs. It has an area of 1,208.54 km^{2} and 595,549 permanent residents as of 2020.

== History ==
Changqing was named after the Xiaoqing River (小清河) that flows through the area. In Zuo Zhuan (《左傳》), it was mentioned that "In the spring of the eleventh year of Duke Ai, the Qi general Gaoping led an army to attack us and reached Qing (清)," which is believed to have taken place in what is now the Changqing region.

During the Qin dynasty, this area belonged to Dong Commandery (東郡). In the Western Han dynasty, Lu County (盧縣) was established, whose jurisdiction encompassed the entire present-day Changqing area. Lu County was regarded as the origin of Chinese surname Lu (盧) and Korean surname Roh (盧).

In the Sui dynasty, part of Lu County was separated to form Changqing County, under the administration of Jibei Commandery (濟北郡).

In the early Tang dynasty, Shanchi County (山茌縣) was divided out from Changqing County. During the reign of Emperor Xuanzong of Tang, it was renamed Fengqi County (豐齊縣), but in the reign of Emperor Xianzong, it was merged back into Changqing County. At that time, Changqing was administered under Yunzhou (鄆州).

From the Northern Song to the Jin dynasty, Changqing County was under the jurisdiction of Jinan Prefecture (濟南府). In Yuan dynasty, Changqing was taken from Jinan, and from 1368 until now, Changqing was again put under the jurisdiction of Jinan Prefecture and Jinan City.

In 2001, Changqing County was elevated into Changqing District.

=== Historical sites ===
- Lingyan Temple
- Mount Liantai
- Xiaotang Mountain Han Shrine
- Tomb of the Jibei King
- Qi Great Wall

== Administrative divisions ==
As of 2012, this district is divided to 4 subdistricts, 5 towns and 1 township.

Subdistricts

- Wenchangjie Subdistrict (文昌街街道)
- Guyunhu Subdistrict (崮云湖街道)
- Ping'an Subdistrict (平安街道)
- Wufengshan Subdistrict (五峰山街道)

Towns

- Guide (归德镇)
- Xiaoli (孝里镇)
- Wande (万德镇)
- Zhangxia (张夏镇)
- Mashan (马山镇)

Townships

- Shuangquan Township (双泉乡)

== Climate ==
Climate data for Changqing District, elevation 99 m (325 ft), (1991−2020 normals, extremes 1981−2010)
Month	Jan	Feb	Mar	Apr	May	Jun	Jul	Aug	Sep	Oct	Nov	Dec	Year
Record high °C (°F)	17.9 (64.2)	21.7 (71.1)	29.7 (85.5)	33.8 (92.8)	38.2 (100.8)	41.4 (106.5)	41.3 (106.3)	35.8 (96.4)	36.8 (98.2)	31.5 (88.7)	25.6 (78.1)	18.1 (64.6)	41.4 (106.5)
Mean daily maximum °C (°F)	4.2 (39.6)	8.2 (46.8)	14.8 (58.6)	21.5 (70.7)	27.1 (80.8)	31.8 (89.2)	32.0 (89.6)	30.4 (86.7)	27.0 (80.6)	21.2 (70.2)	12.9 (55.2)	5.8 (42.4)	19.7 (67.5)
Daily mean °C (°F)	−0.7 (30.7)	2.9 (37.2)	9.1 (48.4)	15.7 (60.3)	21.5 (70.7)	26.2 (79.2)	27.4 (81.3)	25.8 (78.4)	21.6 (70.9)	15.5 (59.9)	7.9 (46.2)	1.1 (34.0)	14.5 (58.1)
Mean daily minimum °C (°F)	−4.6 (23.7)	−1.4 (29.5)	4.2 (39.6)	10.4 (50.7)	16.2 (61.2)	21.0 (69.8)	23.3 (73.9)	22.0 (71.6)	17.2 (63.0)	11.0 (51.8)	3.8 (38.8)	−2.7 (27.1)	10.0 (50.1)
Record low °C (°F)	−20.5 (−4.9)	−14.9 (5.2)	−8.6 (16.5)	−1.2 (29.8)	4.8 (40.6)	11.0 (51.8)	17.3 (63.1)	12.8 (55.0)	7.7 (45.9)	−1.4 (29.5)	−13.0 (8.6)	−18.0 (−0.4)	−20.5 (−4.9)
Average precipitation mm (inches)	5.0 (0.20)	10.1 (0.40)	9.4 (0.37)	34.1 (1.34)	61.3 (2.41)	82.9 (3.26)	189.0 (7.44)	160.2 (6.31)	60.1 (2.37)	27.3 (1.07)	23.7 (0.93)	6.5 (0.26)	669.6 (26.36)
Average precipitation days (≥ 0.1 mm)	2.6	3.6	3.2	5.0	6.4	7.9	11.8	10.7	7.4	5.3	4.5	2.9	71.3
Average snowy days	2.8	3.4	0.8	0.1	0	0	0	0	0	0	0.9	2.1	10.1
Average relative humidity (%)	56	53	48	52	56	57	73	78	71	62	61	58	60
Mean monthly sunshine hours	152.6	155.2	209.9	234.9	259.6	233.1	195.7	198.0	187.0	188.9	162.6	155.2	2,332.7
Percentage possible sunshine	49	50	56	59	59	53	44	48	51	55	54	52	53
Source: China Meteorological Administration

== Changqing University Town ==
The Changqing University Town (Chinese: 长清大学科技园) is located in Changqing district. It holds more than 10 universities and colleges, like Shandong Normal University, Shandong Women's University, etc.
