= Tomb of the Jibei King =

Western Han dynasty tomb in China

Coordinates: 36°26′42.7″N 116°38′21.5″E

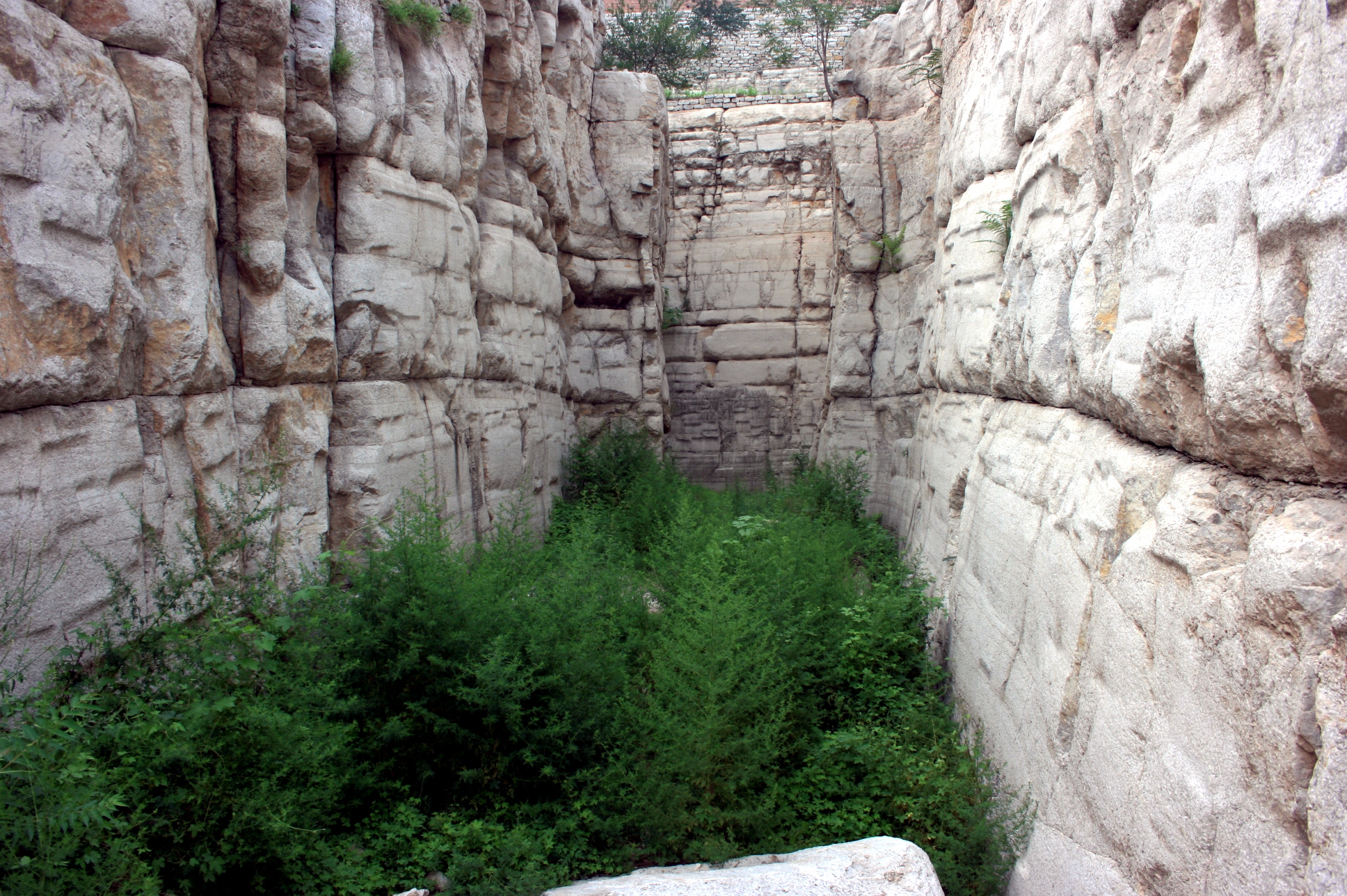
View from the entrance ramp into the burial chamber

The Tomb of the Jibei King (simplified Chinese: 汉济北王墓; traditional Chinese: 漢濟北王墓; pinyin: Hàn Jìběi Wáng Mù) is a tomb from the time of the Western Han dynasty in Changqing District of Jinan, Shandong Province, China. It is also known as the Han Dynasty Tomb of Shuangru Mountain (Chinese: 双乳山汉墓; pinyin: Shuāngrǔshān Hàn mù). The tomb is thought to have been the burial site of Liu Kuan (Chinese: 刘宽), the last king of Jibei who ruled from 97 to 85 BC during the time of the Emperor Wu of Han of the Western Han dynasty. The tomb was a major archaeological find since it had been untouched by grave robbers. Its discovery was ranked among the top ten Chinese archaeological finds of 1996 by Chinese National Office for Cultural Artefacts.

The City of Lu (thought to have been located near modern Luchengwa in Jinan City about five kilometers north of the tomb) served as the capital of the Kingdom of Jibei as well as a cultural and economic center during the time of the Han dynasty. Liu Kuan, the last king of Jibei was forced to commit suicide for having an affair with his widowed step mother and for cursing the emperor during a sacrifice. The tomb of the King of Jibei was carved into a limestone cliff and covered a total area of 1,500 square meters. It was excavated during the years 1995 and 1997 by archaeologists of Shandong University. More than 2000 artifacts – bronze objects, jade objects, lacquer wares, iron artifacts, ceramics, and gold objects were recovered from the site. Among the jade artifacts, a jade mask made of 18 pieces, jade swords, and jade headrests are particularly noteworthy. Gold artifacts include about 20 gold ingots (so-called "gold cakes", Chinese: 金饼; pinyin: Jin Bing) as well as pieces belonging to chariots. The discovered artifacts reflect the wealth of the city during this period. If the identification of the tomb as the burial place of Liu Kuan is correct, he had been granted a royal burial despite his disgrace. However, the jade burial suit which was customary for wealthy aristocrats of the period may have been denied to him as a result. The artifacts have been relocated to the Museum of Changqing District (Chinese: 长清区博物馆; pinyin: Changqing Qu Bowuguan) in the town of Changqing and the Shandong Museum in Jinan.

The tomb has been listed as a monument of the People's Republic of China with resolution number 5–168. The archaeological name of the site is Shuangrushan Han Tomb Number 1 as a second tomb from the same period is located nearby.

== Image gallery ==
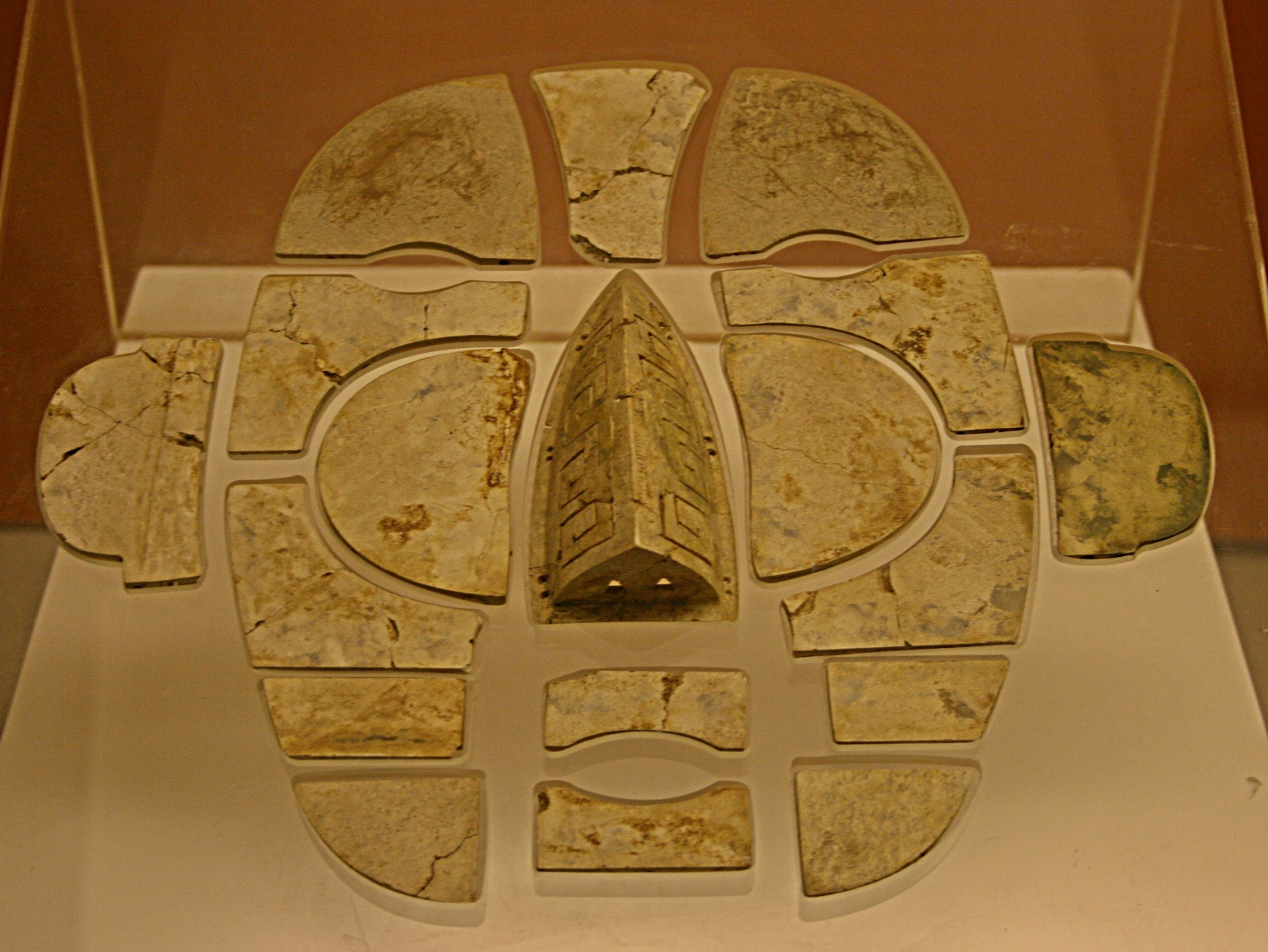
Jade mask of the king

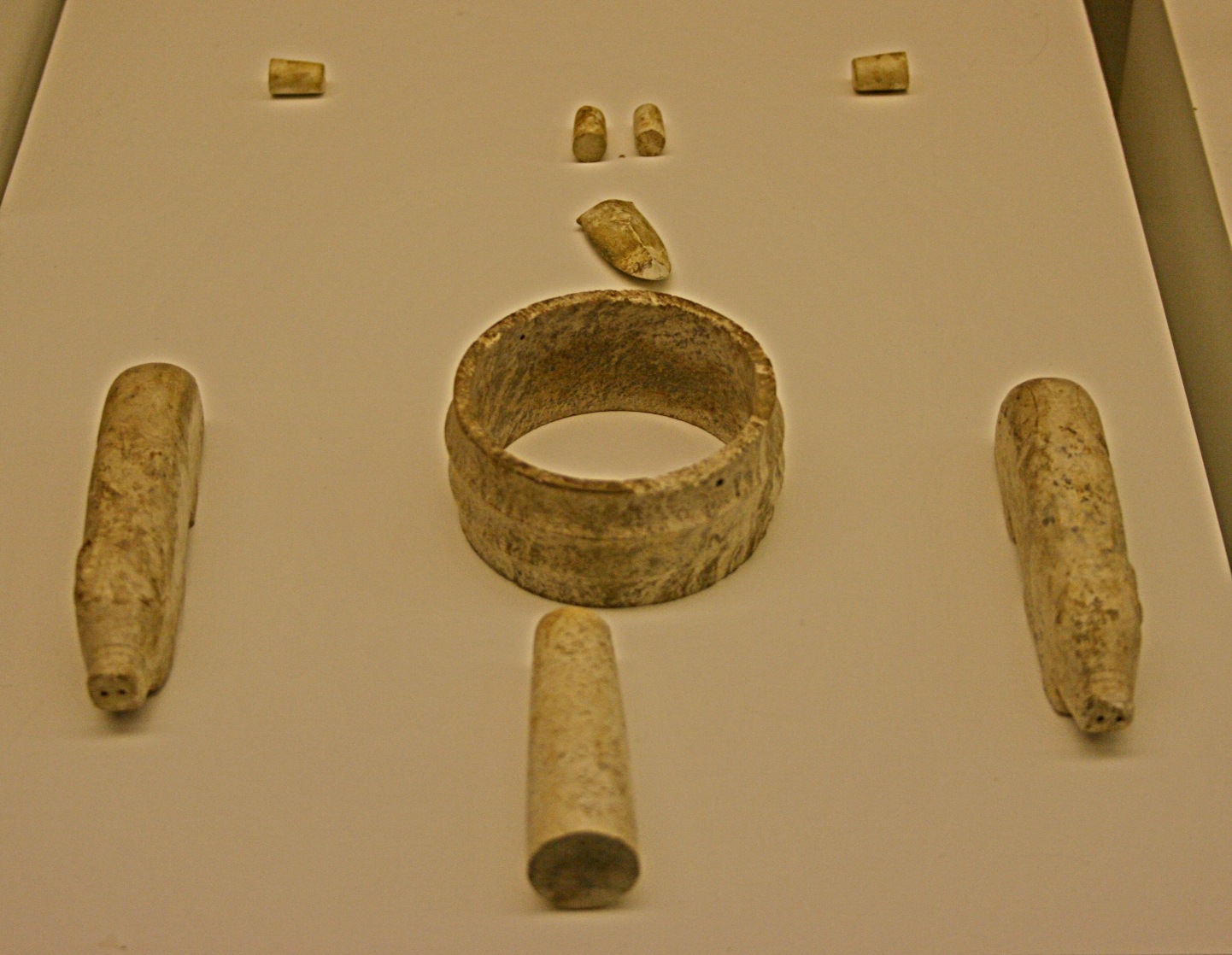
Small jade objects placed on the corpse

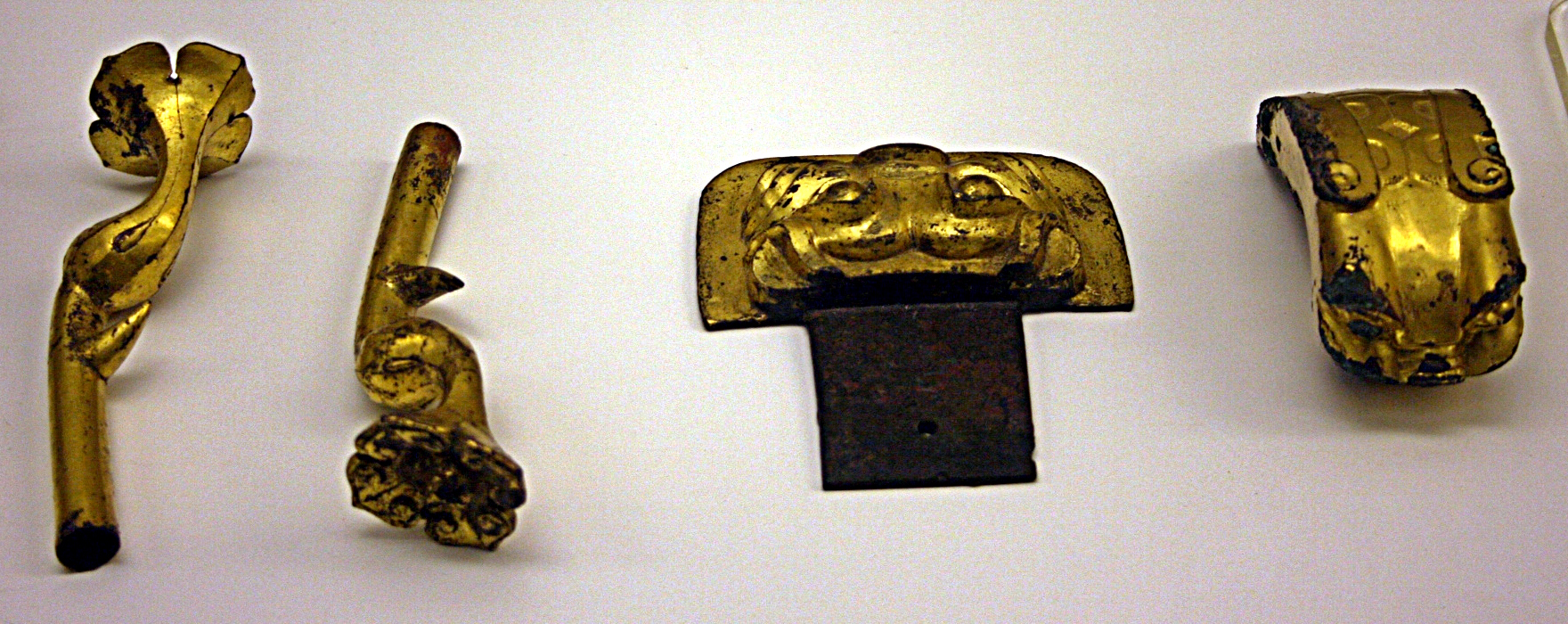
Gilt bronze chariot fittings

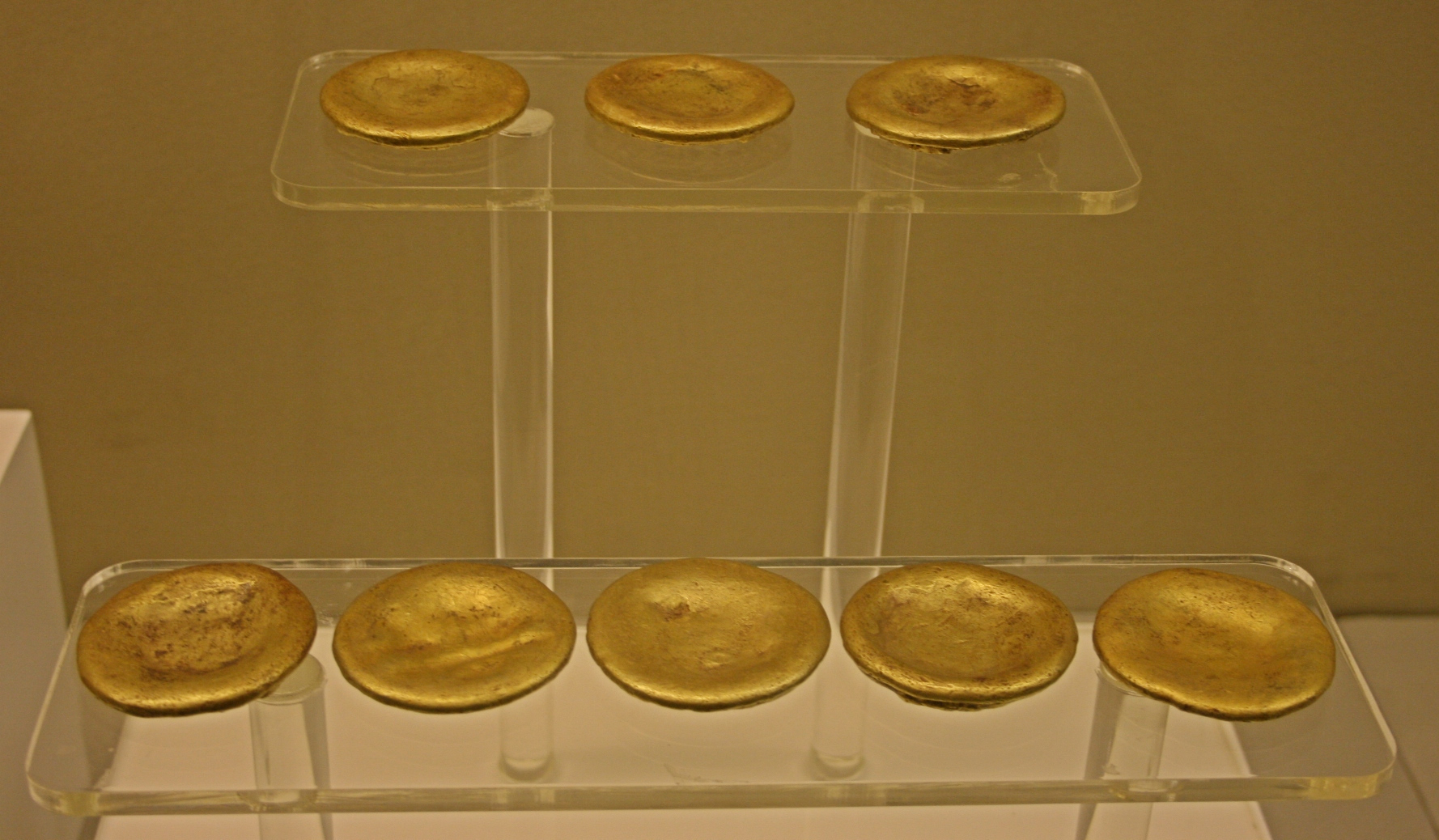
Gold ingots

== See also ==
- List of sites in Jinan
