= Yangxin =

Yangxin may refer to:

- Yangxin County, Hubei (阳新县), China
- Yangxin County, Shandong (阳信县), China
- Hall of Mental Cultivation or Yangxin Hall, Forbidden City, Beijing
- Lankiam Cay in Spratly Islands in South China Sea, distantly to the south of Hainan Island of China

== See also ==
- Yang Xin (disambiguation)
