= Zhangqiu, Jinan =

Zhangqiu 章丘区 Changkiu
- District
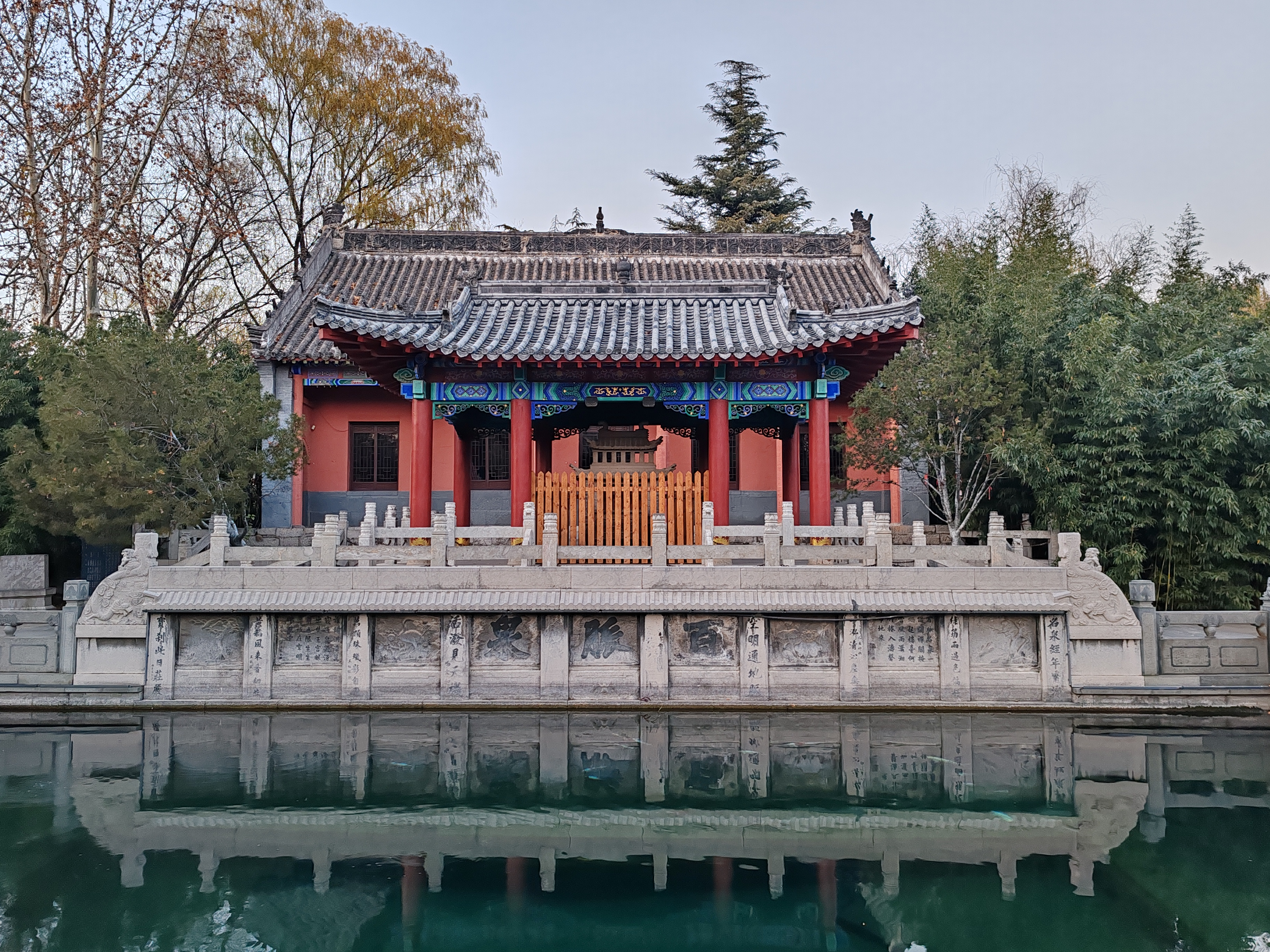
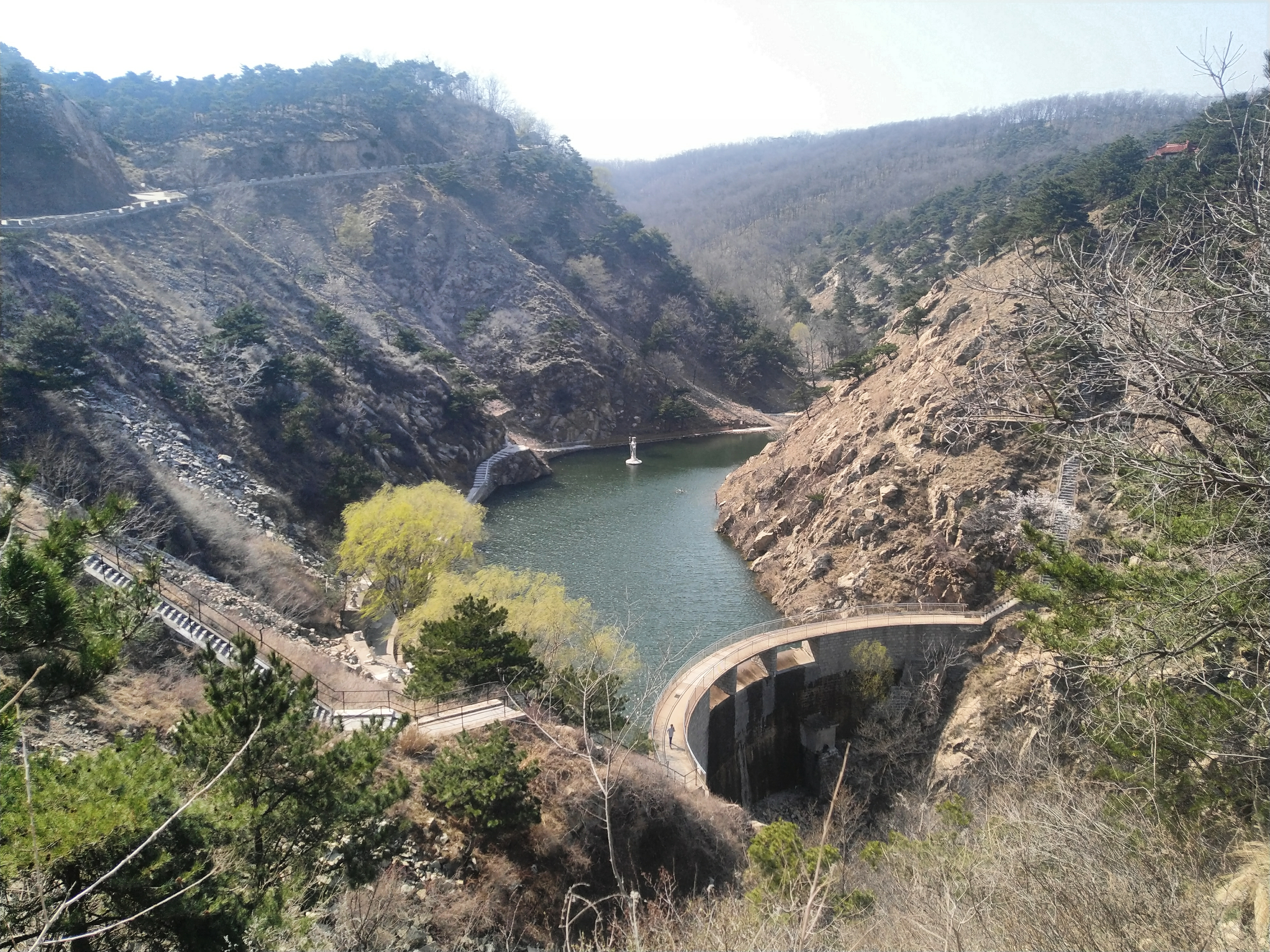
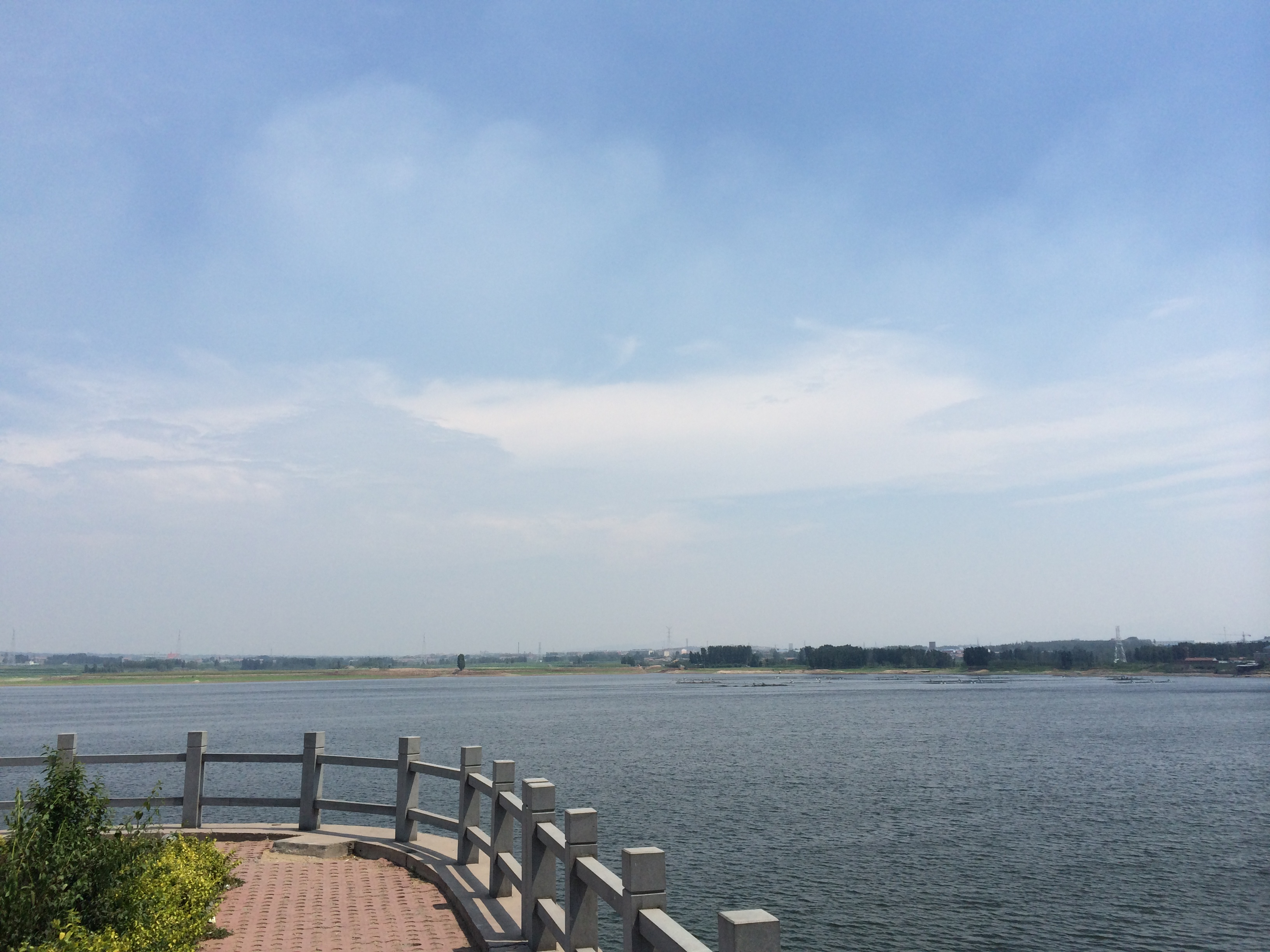
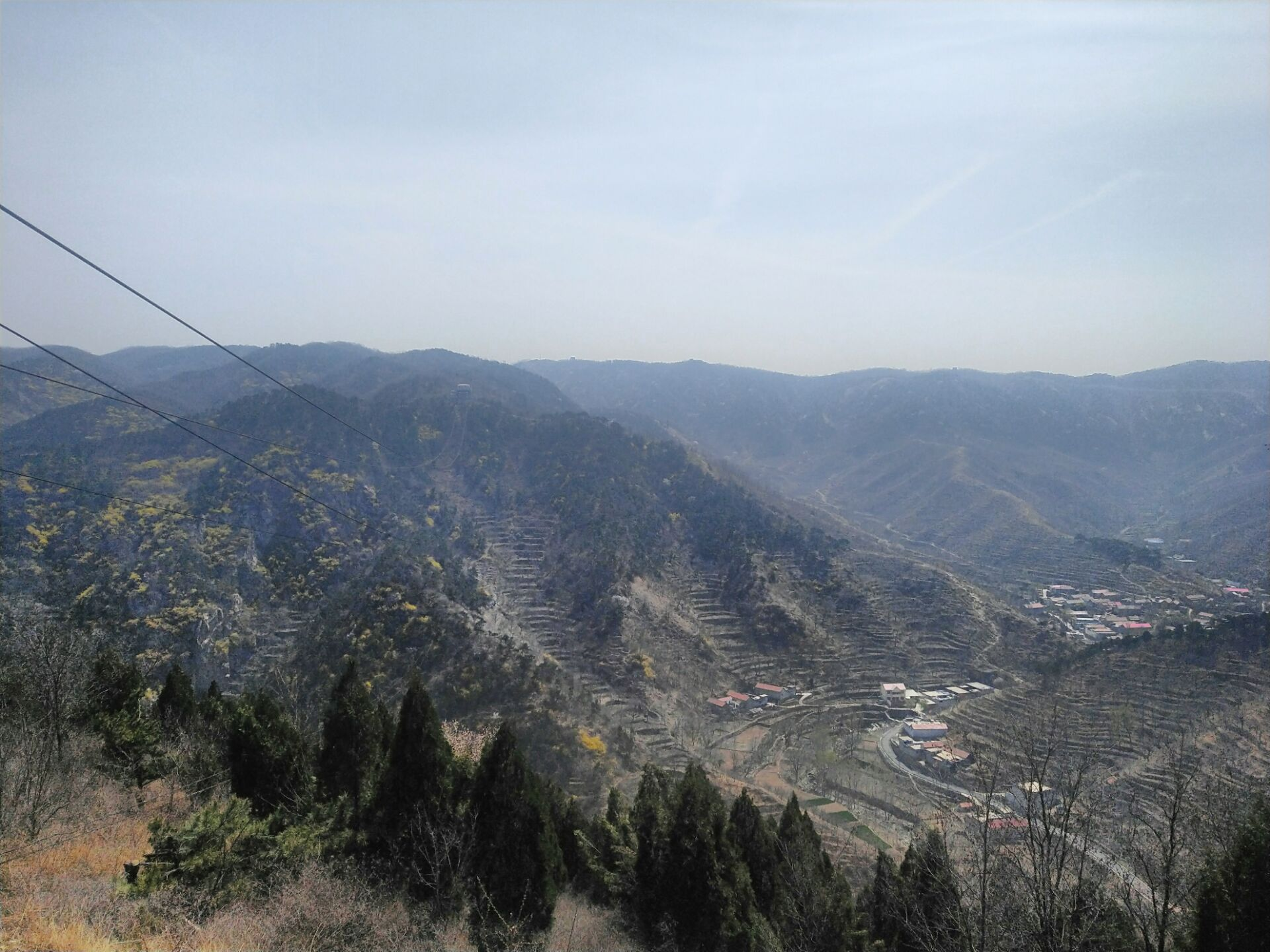
- Baimai Springs Yao Lake Xinglin Reservoir Qixingtai

- Location in Shandong
- Coordinates: 36°41′35″N 117°31′05″E
- Country: People's Republic of China
- Province: Shandong
- Sub-provincial city: Jinan

Area
  - District: 1,721.29 km^{2} (664.59 sq mi)
  - Metro: 1,721.29 km^{2} (664.59 sq mi)

Population (2020 census)
  - District: 1,075,784
  - Density: 624.987/km^{2} (1,618.71/sq mi)
  - Metro: 1,064,210
  - Metro density: 618.263/km^{2} (1,601.29/sq mi)
- Time zone: UTC+8 (China Standard)
- Postal code: 250200

Zhangqiu (simplified Chinese: 章丘; traditional Chinese: 章邱; pinyin: Zhāngqiū) is one of 10 urban districts of the prefecture-level city of Jinan, the capital of Shandong Province, East China. The district has an area of 1721.29 square kilometers, 20 towns, 908 villages and the permanent resident population was 1,075,784 as of 2020 even though its built-up (or metro) area is much smaller.

== History ==
Zhangqiu is the home to Longshan Culture that existed around 2900-2100 BC. Longshan Culture is known for its black ceramics and the earliest features to late characterize the Shang civilization, scapulimancy and hangtu construction (see Chengziya Archaeological Site).

During the Spring and Autumn period, Zhangqiu was governed by State of Qi in the west and State of Tan in the east, until Tan was conquered by Qi in 684 BCE. Under Qi's rule, there were five estates: Pingying (平陵邑), Ning (寧邑), Tai (臺邑), Cui (崔邑), and Lai (賴邑); among them, estate of Cui later became the origin of Chinese surname Cui and Korean surname Choi, as well as the famous Cui clan of Boling and Cui clan of Qinghe.

It is believed that the local name Zhangqiu or Zhangqiu Hill (章丘山) is named after Qi general Kuang Zhang (匡章), who led Battle of Chuisha and buried here; 'qiu' (丘) stands for 'hill, mound', which refers to the tomb of Kuang Zhang. During Liu Song dynasty in 5th century, Gaotang (高唐) County was set here, and in 596, the name was changed into Zhangqiu to avoid confliation in name with another Gaotang County (in present day Liaocheng) in this region. The Zhangqiu County has Mingshui (明水) as its capital, and it was affiliated to Jinan from the 10th century to the end of Qing dynasty in 1911.

In 1735, the writing of Zhangqiu was changed from 章丘 to 章邱, as first "Qiu" (丘) was the name of Confucius, the change was reverted after the 1950s.

After the Republic of China was founded, all counties changed their status to be directly administered by the province, like in the United States. Zhangqiu went back to be a part of Jinan in 1953, after the communist established the regime. In August 1992 Zhangqiu County was upgraded into Zhangqiu City.

== Administrative divisions ==
As of 2017, this district is divided to 15 subdistricts and 3 towns.

=== Subdistricts ===
- Mingshui Subdistrict (明水街道)
- Shuangshan Subdistrict (双山街道)
- Zaoyuan Subdistrict (枣园街道)
- Longshan Subdistrict (龙山街道)
- Bucun Subdistrict (埠村街道)
- Shengjing Subdistrict (圣井街道)

Subdistricts upgraded from towns

- Puji Subdistrict (普集镇)
- Xiuhui Subdistrict (绣惠镇)
- Xiangsongzhuang Subdistrict (相公庄镇)
- Wenzu Subdistrict (文祖镇)
- Gaoguanzhai Subdistrict (高官寨镇)
- Baiyunhu Subdistrict (白云湖镇)
- Ningjiabu Subdistrict (宁家埠镇)
- Caofan Subdistrict (曹范镇)
- Guanzhuang Subdistrict (官庄乡)

=== Towns ===
- Diao (刁镇)
- Duozhuang (垛庄镇)
- Huanghe Township (黄河镇) - is upgraded from township.

Former Towns

- Shuizhai (水寨镇)

Former Townships

- Xinzhai Township (辛寨乡)

=== Villages ===
- Nanmengcun

== Climate ==
Climate data for Zhangqiu, elevation 122 m (400 ft), (1991–2020 normals, extremes 1981–2010)
Month	Jan	Feb	Mar	Apr	May	Jun	Jul	Aug	Sep	Oct	Nov	Dec	Year
Record high °C (°F)	18.5 (65.3)	25.5 (77.9)	30.8 (87.4)	34.6 (94.3)	38.4 (101.1)	40.5 (104.9)	40.7 (105.3)	36.9 (98.4)	38.4 (101.1)	34.0 (93.2)	25.6 (78.1)	19.0 (66.2)	40.7 (105.3)
Mean daily maximum °C (°F)	3.8 (38.8)	7.8 (46.0)	14.1 (57.4)	21.6 (70.9)	27.1 (80.8)	31.3 (88.3)	31.8 (89.2)	30.2 (86.4)	26.8 (80.2)	21.0 (69.8)	12.6 (54.7)	5.7 (42.3)	19.5 (67.1)
Daily mean °C (°F)	−1.3 (29.7)	2.2 (36.0)	8.4 (47.1)	15.7 (60.3)	21.5 (70.7)	26.0 (78.8)	27.3 (81.1)	25.6 (78.1)	21.5 (70.7)	15.5 (59.9)	7.6 (45.7)	0.9 (33.6)	14.2 (57.6)
Mean daily minimum °C (°F)	−5.7 (21.7)	−2.6 (27.3)	3.0 (37.4)	9.8 (49.6)	15.6 (60.1)	20.5 (68.9)	23.0 (73.4)	21.5 (70.7)	16.4 (61.5)	10.2 (50.4)	2.8 (37.0)	−3.4 (25.9)	9.3 (48.7)
Record low °C (°F)	−21.1 (−6.0)	−18.5 (−1.3)	−12.9 (8.8)	−6.1 (21.0)	−0.1 (31.8)	9.2 (48.6)	14.1 (57.4)	11.6 (52.9)	4.9 (40.8)	−4.9 (23.2)	−15.6 (3.9)	−26.8 (−16.2)	−26.8 (−16.2)
Average precipitation mm (inches)	4.9 (0.19)	10.6 (0.42)	12.4 (0.49)	30.8 (1.21)	68.6 (2.70)	88.9 (3.50)	173.0 (6.81)	155.2 (6.11)	58.5 (2.30)	29.4 (1.16)	24.4 (0.96)	7.0 (0.28)	663.7 (26.13)
Average precipitation days (≥ 0.1 mm)	2.5	3.4	3.6	5.5	7.0	8.2	12.2	11.6	6.8	5.7	4.6	3.3	74.4
Average snowy days	3.6	3.2	1.3	0.2	0	0	0	0	0	0	1.0	2.2	11.5
Average relative humidity (%)	55	51	47	49	54	56	73	78	68	60	58	56	59
Mean monthly sunshine hours	149.1	156.7	198.1	225.8	249.9	218.2	179.3	181.7	180.8	188.5	157.4	148.6	2,234.1
Percentage possible sunshine	48	51	53	57	57	50	40	44	49	55	52	50	51
Source: China Meteorological Administration

== Geography ==
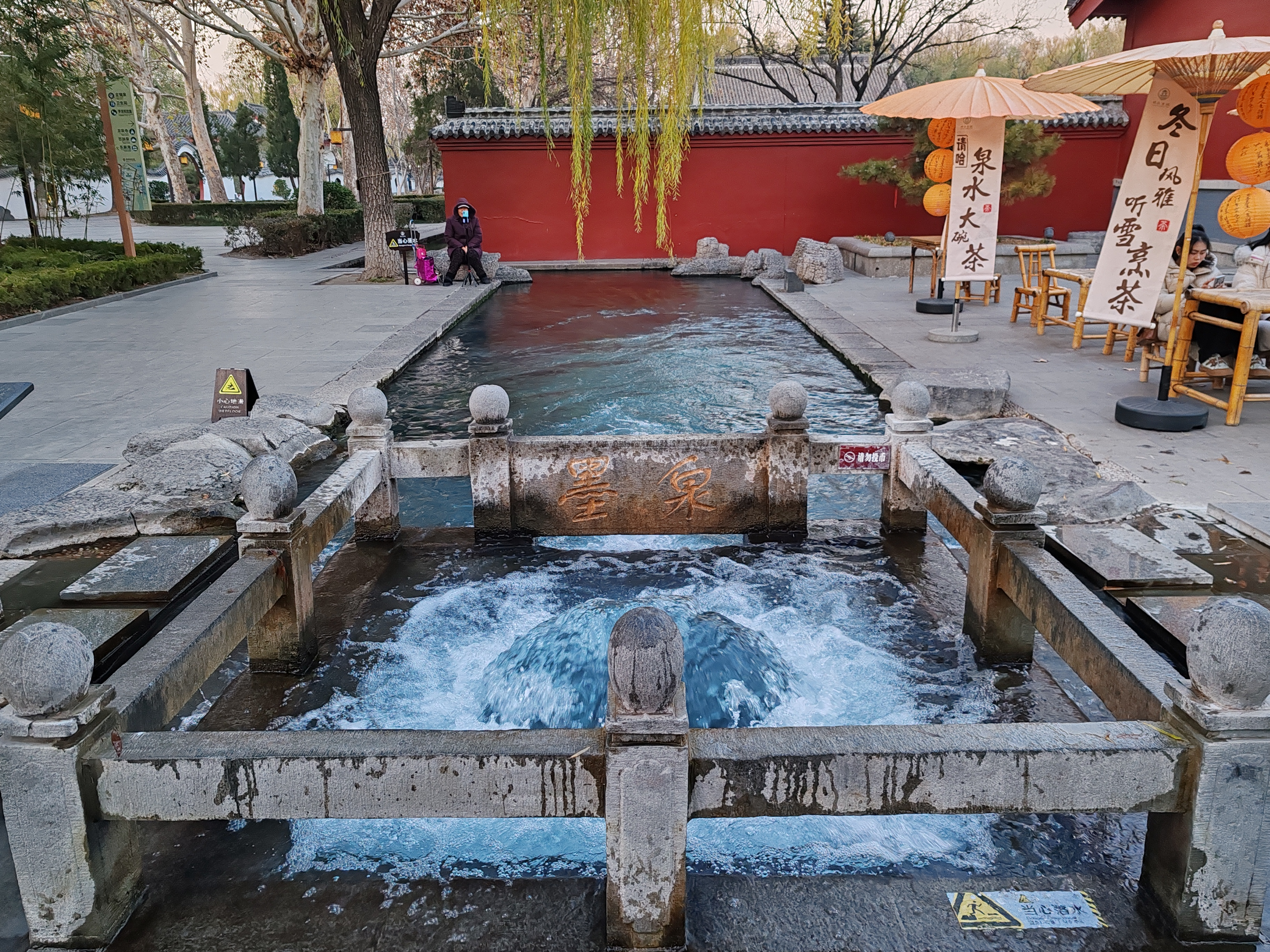
Mo Spring (lit. Ink Spring)

Located in central Shandong province, Zhangqiu is 50 kilometers to the east of Jinan, the capital of Shandong province. It is 120 kilometers north from Mount Tai and the Yellow River is the north border of Zhangqiu. Jinan Yaoqiang International Airport is situated at Yaoqiang Village of Zhangqiu.

Zhangqiu is known for its springs and scenery outside the crowded city of Jinan. The East Jingshi Road and several Province Highways connect Mingshui and Jinan.

== Notable people ==
- Du Fuwei (595–624), rebel leader and general during the early Tang dynasty
- Fang Xuanling (579–648), prominent chancellor of the early Tang dynasty
- Li Qingzhao (1084–c. 1155), renowned female poet of the Song dynasty
- Xin Qiji (1140–1207), military leader and poet of the Southern Song dynasty
- Zhang Yanghao (1270–1329), poet and official of the Yuan dynasty
- Li Kaixian (1502–1568), playwright and scholar of the Ming dynasty
- Li Jinming (born 1985), actress
- Yan Ning (born 1977), structural biologist
