= Jiyang, Jinan =

Jiyang 济阳区 Tsiyang
- District
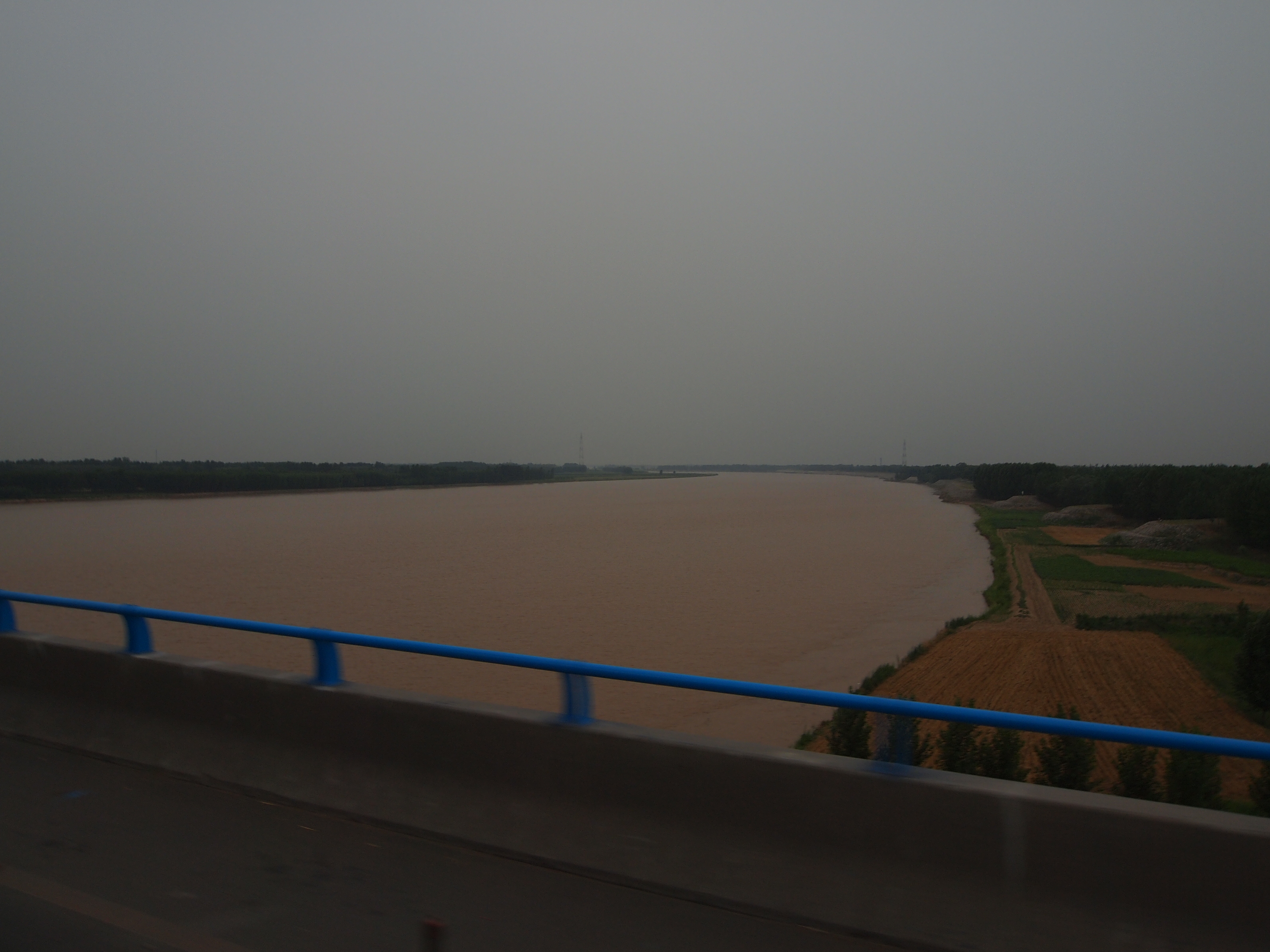
- Jiyang Yellow River Bridge

- Location in Shandong
- Coordinates: 36°58′41″N 117°12′32″E
- Country: People's Republic of China
- Province: Shandong
- Sub-provincial city: Jinan

Area
  - Total: 1,097.15 km^{2} (423.61 sq mi)

Population (2019)
  - Total: 597,200
  - Density: 544.3/km^{2} (1,410/sq mi)
- Time zone: UTC+8 (China Standard)
- Postal code: 251400

Jiyang (simplified Chinese: 济阳; traditional Chinese: 濟陽; pinyin: Jǐyáng) is one of 10 urban districts of the prefecture-level city of Jinan, the capital of Shandong Province, East China.

The population was 520,095 in 1999.

== History ==
In the seventh year of Tianhui of Jin Dynasty (around 1216), Emperor Taizong of Jin established the county Jiyang, because it is at the north side of river Ji. After the People's Republic of China was established, Jiyang was annexed by Linyi County in 1958. In 1961, Jiyang County was recovered.

== Transportation ==
Jiyang is 45 kilometers from Jinan city, and transportation is convenient. It is 8 kilometers from Jinan International airport, connected to Jinan city through the third north ring highway of Jinan, the third bridge of Yellow River, and Jinan Yellow River highway bridge. 104, 220 national highways and 248, 249 provincial roads all go through the district.

== Administrative divisions ==
As of 2012, this district is divided to 2 subdistricts and 8 towns.

Subdistricts

- Jiyang Subdistrict (济阳街道)
- Jibei Subdistrict (济北街道)

Towns

- Duoshi (垛石镇)
- Sungeng (孙耿镇)
- Qudi (曲堤镇)
- Renfeng (仁风镇)
- Cuizhai (崔寨镇)
- Taiping (太平镇)
- Huihe (回河镇)
- Xinshi (新市镇)

== Climate ==
Climate data for Jiyang, elevation 20 m (66 ft), (1991–2020 normals, extremes 1967–present)
Month	Jan	Feb	Mar	Apr	May	Jun	Jul	Aug	Sep	Oct	Nov	Dec	Year
Record high °C (°F)	18.7 (65.7)	22.9 (73.2)	30.0 (86.0)	33.7 (92.7)	39.5 (103.1)	41.2 (106.2)	40.6 (105.1)	37.4 (99.3)	37.2 (99.0)	31.5 (88.7)	27.1 (80.8)	18.5 (65.3)	41.2 (106.2)
Mean daily maximum °C (°F)	3.6 (38.5)	7.6 (45.7)	14.2 (57.6)	21.1 (70.0)	26.7 (80.1)	31.6 (88.9)	32.1 (89.8)	30.4 (86.7)	27.1 (80.8)	21.0 (69.8)	12.5 (54.5)	5.3 (41.5)	19.4 (67.0)
Daily mean °C (°F)	−2.3 (27.9)	1.1 (34.0)	7.6 (45.7)	14.6 (58.3)	20.4 (68.7)	25.4 (77.7)	27.1 (80.8)	25.5 (77.9)	20.7 (69.3)	14.2 (57.6)	6.2 (43.2)	−0.4 (31.3)	13.3 (56.0)
Mean daily minimum °C (°F)	−6.8 (19.8)	−4.0 (24.8)	1.7 (35.1)	8.2 (46.8)	14.0 (57.2)	19.2 (66.6)	22.7 (72.9)	21.5 (70.7)	15.5 (59.9)	8.7 (47.7)	1.2 (34.2)	−4.7 (23.5)	8.1 (46.6)
Record low °C (°F)	−20.3 (−4.5)	−16.5 (2.3)	−10.3 (13.5)	−3.6 (25.5)	3.9 (39.0)	9.6 (49.3)	16.0 (60.8)	13.2 (55.8)	4.9 (40.8)	−4.1 (24.6)	−15.1 (4.8)	−21.6 (−6.9)	−21.6 (−6.9)
Average precipitation mm (inches)	4.1 (0.16)	9.1 (0.36)	9.6 (0.38)	28.9 (1.14)	50.9 (2.00)	76.8 (3.02)	169.9 (6.69)	148.1 (5.83)	48.8 (1.92)	29.7 (1.17)	19.2 (0.76)	4.8 (0.19)	599.9 (23.62)
Average precipitation days (≥ 0.1 mm)	2.2	3.1	2.9	5.0	6.6	8.0	11.0	10.6	6.5	5.3	4.3	2.8	68.3
Average snowy days	2.8	2.7	0.9	0.1	0	0	0	0	0	0	0.9	2.0	9.4
Average relative humidity (%)	64	60	55	59	64	64	77	83	78	70	69	67	68
Mean monthly sunshine hours	151.9	155.3	208.9	231.1	261.9	227.2	192.8	189.6	189.9	181.9	152.2	147.3	2,290
Percentage possible sunshine	49	50	56	58	60	52	43	46	52	53	50	49	52
Source: China Meteorological Administration

== Education ==
=== Elementary school ===
- Jiyang Jibei Elementary School 济阳县济北小学
- Yingcai Elementary School 英才小学
- Tianshan Elementary School 天山小学
- Jiyang Modern Elementary School 济阳现代小学
- Jiyang Zhiyuan Elementary School 济阳志远小学

=== Middle school ===
- Jiyang Chuangxin Middle School 济阳创新中学
- Jiyang Jingyeyuan Middle School 竞业园学校
- Jiyang No.10 Middle School 山东省济阳县第十中学

=== High school ===
- Jiyang No.1 High School 济阳县第一中学
- Jiyang Jibei High School 济阳县济北中学

== Local Delicacies ==
A famous variety of watermelon called Shaixi watermelon is from Jiyang. It is very small and the flesh color is yellow and sweet.
