= Han Fuju =

Chinese general and warlord (1890–1938)

- 韓復榘
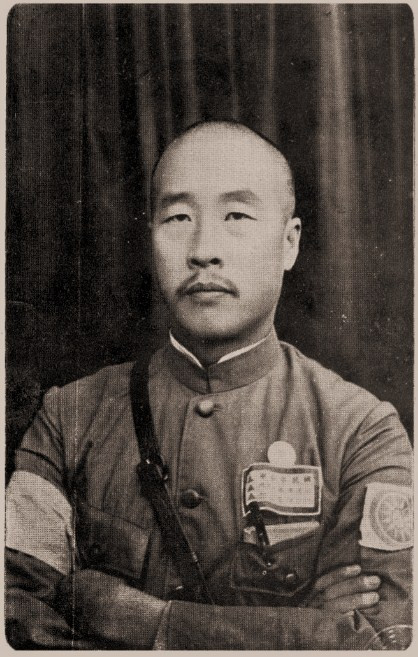
- Han Fuju in 1929

Governor of Shandong
- In office September 1930 – January 1938
- Preceded by: Chen Diaoyuan
- Succeeded by: Shen Honglie

Governor of Henan
- In office December 1928 – October 1930
- Preceded by: Feng Yuxiang
- Succeeded by: Liu Zhi

Personal details
- Born: 1890 Dongshantai Village, Ba County, Zhili Province, (Qing dynasty) Qing Dynasty
- Died: 24 January, 1938 Wuchang, Hubei Province, (Republic of China (1912–1949)) Republic of China
- Party: Kuomintang (1929–1938)
- Nickname(s): Flying General; Justice Han; King of Shandong

Military service
- Allegiance: (Qing dynasty) Qing China (Republic of China (1912–1949)) Republic of China
- Branch/service: Beiyang Army Guominjun National Revolutionary Army
- Commands: 3rd Army Group, National Revolutionary Army
- Battles/wars: Xinhai Revolution; Luanzhou Uprising; Bai Lang Rebellion; Manchu Restoration; Warlord Era; Zhili–Anhui War; First Zhili–Fengtian War; Beijing Coup; Anti-Fengtian War; Northern Expedition; Henan Campaign; Battle of Zhang River; Capture of Beijing; 1929 campaign against Feng Yuxiang; Battle of Heishiguan; Central Plains War; Shandong Campaign; Han–Liu War; Second Sino-Japanese War; Tianjin–Pukou Railway Operation

Han Fuju or Han Fu-chü (simplified Chinese: 韩复榘; traditional Chinese: 韓復榘; pinyin: Hán Fùjǔ; Wade–Giles: Han Fu-chü; 1890 – 24 January 1938), courtesy name Xiangfang (向方), was a Chinese warlord who ruled Shandong from 1930 to 1937. A protégé of Feng Yuxiang in the Guominjun (Northwest Army), he twice defected from his mentor before being rewarded with the governorship of Shandong after siding with Chiang Kai-shek's Kuomintang in the 1930 Central Plains War.

During his seven-year rule, Han implemented administrative reforms, suppressed bandits and communists, built infrastructure, and promoted education. He maintained an uneasy autonomy from the Nationalist government, balancing between Chiang and Japan. He refused to fully commit to the Nationalist war effort, prioritizing the preservation of his own army over national defense. Han is mainly known today for his failure to defend Shandong against the Japanese invasion, which led to his execution by Chiang Kai-shek.

Opinions on Han are divided. He has been stereotyped as an ignorant and illiterate warlord on account of his rural background, as well as a pro-Japanese traitor. However, revisionist views place Han as an able administrator who fought against the Japanese before his unauthorized retreat.

== Early life and career ==
=== Childhood and early years ===
Han Fuju was born in 1890 into a well-off landowning family in Dongshantai Village (Chinese: 东山台村; pinyin: Dōngshāntái Cūn), Ba County, Zhili Province. Han's family owned around 30 mu of land along the Zhongting River, which ensured they were self-sufficient.

In 1900, the Boxer Rebellion broke out. Han Fuju's family residence was a target for the Boxers, who burned it down and forced Han to flee. In the chaos, the Boxers also killed Han's grandmother and uncle. Afterwards, the Han family's financial situation declined precipitously, forcing Han Fuju to do farm work. Despite this newfound poverty, Han's father insisted on sending him to school.

According to writer Frank Dorn, Han had "little aptitude for schooling," and soon dropped out; however, he did manage to acquire literacy. Nevertheless, the stereotype of Han being an illiterate, rural boor would remain in the popular imagination.

Han began accumulating heavy debts from gambling, even pawning off his wife's clothes and jewelry for more gambling money. His family resolved to provide him stable employment, and in 1905 he began work as a scribe in the Ba County household registration office. After around two years, he had relapsed into gambling, which his meager salary could ill-afford. In 1909, he fell deep into debt and fled his hometown the next year, resolving to move to Manchuria.

=== Joining Feng Yuxiang ===
Han had hoped to find his elder brother, whom he had heard had also moved to Manchuria. However, after around a month of searching, Han once again ended up penniless in Xinmin, Fengtian. On the verge of destitution, he met with a fortune-teller, who suggested he join the Qing army and offered to introduce him. Han Fuju thus joined the 20th Division of the 3rd Regiment of the Beiyang Army. The 3rd Regiment was then under the command of Feng Yuxiang, who took a liking to Han and appointed him as a clerk.

In 1911, the Xinhai Revolution broke out. Feng, who had already been secretly forming anti-Qing organizations, launched an uprising in Luanzhou which was suppressed by Yuan Shikai and Wang Huaiqing. Due to Han's participation in this uprising, he was sent back to his home county.

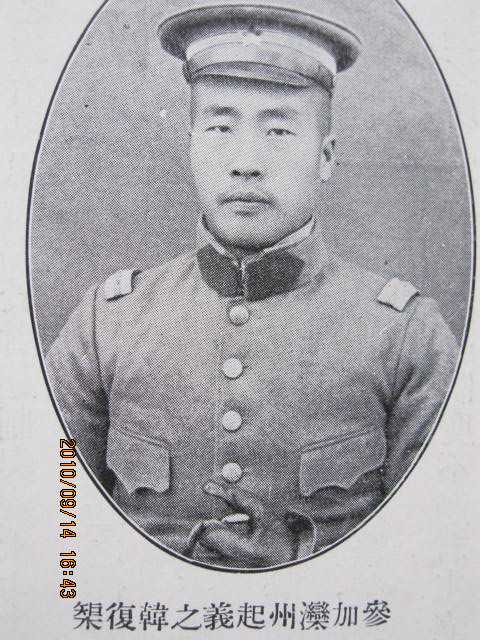
Han Fuju in 1913

After the revolution ended and the monarchy was deposed, Yuan Shikai became President. He again reorganized the army, reappointing Feng as a battalion commander. Upon hearing of this, Han went to Nanyuan to rejoin the Beiyang Army. soon ranking up to quartermaster sergeant. In August 1913, when Feng was promoted to regimental commander, Han was also promoted to a platoon leader, thus beginning his formal military career.

Over the next few years, as China collapsed into the Warlord Era, Han accompanied Feng on several military campaigns. He took part in the suppression of the 1914 Bai Lang Rebellion, but Feng's regiment refused to fight for Yuan Shikai when he proclaimed himself Emperor and the National Protection War began. During the 1917 Manchu Restoration, Han and Feng fought against and defeated the forces of royalist general Zhang Xun. Around this time, he had been stationed in Langfang, bringing his wife with him.

In 1918, during the Constitutional Protection War against Sun Yat-sen's Guangzhou junta, Feng's army reluctantly captured Changde, and Han was stationed here. By now, he had become a battalion commander in Feng's artillery regiments, and was known as one of Feng's "thirteen guardians/protectors" (十三太保), or Feng's most trusted subordinates. (Note: The other Thirteen Protectors were: Sun Liangcheng, Sun Lianzhong, Tong Linge, Liu Ruming, Shi Yousan, Zhang Weixi, Guo Zhigang, Wen Chenglie, Cheng Xixian, Ge Jinzhang, Zhao Xiping, and Han Duofeng.)

China had by then fractured into various warlord cliques; the two most powerful of which were the Zhili and Anhui cliques. Feng and Han were affiliated with the Zhili Clique, and played a role in the defeat of the Anhui in the 1920 Zhili–Anhui War. He continued fighting for the Zhili throughout the early 1920s, helping depose Chen Shufan in 1921 and then defeating the Fengtian clique in the 1922 Zhili–Fengtian War. By October 1922, Han Fuju had become a regimental commander in the 11th Division.

== With the Guominjun: two defections ==
=== Beijing Coup and first defection ===
In 1924, another war broke out between the Zhili and Fengtian cliques. Feng, by now resentful of the Zhili, organized a coup in Beijing instead of fighting against Fengtian. The coup succeeded and President Cao-kun was placed under arrest, with Feng and his allies forming the Guominjun (National People's Army). Han had participated in this coup, and was promoted to brigade commander of the 1st Division for his services. In December 1925, he fought against Li Jinglin of the Fengtian army, capturing Tianjin and forcing Li to flee the province. Because of this, he was once again promoted to commander of the 1st Division.

By now, the Anti-Fengtian War had begun in earnest. Despite its name, the main feature of the war was a coalition of Northern warlords—Zhang Zuolin, Wu Peifu, and Yan Xishan—forming an alliance to oppose the Guominjun. Feng was soundly defeated and fled to the Soviet Union, leaving Zhang Zhijiang to rule in his stead. Facing attacks from all sides, the Guominjun retreated to Nankou. It was in this situation that Han had finally been promoted to the commander of the Guominjun's Sixth Army, stationed at the strategic Juyong Pass, but he had been dissatisfied by Zhang's leadership and the poor conditions of his army; they had run low on ammunition and supplies, and Zhang had informed him that there were no reinforcements available. Nevertheless, the Sixth Army was ordered to attack Datong in Shanxi. When the assault predictably failed due to lack of supplies, the morale of Han's army further collapsed. It was then that Shi Yousan, another Guominjun general, urged Han to surrender and defect to Yan Xishan's Shanxi clique, an offer which Han took.

Yan Xishan appointed Han Fuju as the commander of the 13th Shanxi Army Division, stationed at Baotou and Guisui.

=== Return to Feng Yuxiang and second defection ===
In November 1926, during the Northern Expedition, Feng Yuxiang, now back in China and affiliated with the Kuomintang (KMT), went to Shanxi to win back the generals who had defected. Feng was reportedly understanding, saying that defecting officers' actions were forced by necessity and that they had had no other choice. The two reconciled in Baotou, and Feng named Han as commander of the Sixth Route of the Guominjun. Yan Xishan's army attempted to stop this defection, but Han threatened to fire on them, and they backed down. Around this time, Sun Tongxuan became a division commander in Han's army; he would later become one of Han's most loyal subordinates.

Routes of the Northern Expedition. Han Fuju's forces under the Guominjun (dark blue arrow) fought from Shaanxi to Beijing.

Han fought in several campaigns during the Northern Expedition, initially against Zhili-aligned warlords in Shaanxi and Gansu. Later, in 1927, his army attacked into Henan, capturing Luoyang and Zhengzhou. Having linked up with the rest of the National Revolutionary Army (NRA), Han pressed his advantage by advancing further into eastern Henan and Jiangsu. At a battle at Lanfeng, Han executed a flanking maneuver, capturing 30,000 Zhili troops. After this triumph, he continued attacking, advancing further to the gates of Xuzhou over Feng Yuxiang's recommendations; consequently, he ended up encircled and had to be rescued by Liu Ruming's forces. Of this incident, Feng reportedly commented that Han's military achievements were undone by his greed. Only in December 1927 was Xuzhou finally captured for the Northern Expedition.

==== Race to Beijing: growing disloyalty ====
In February 1928, the second phase of the Northern Expedition was launched against Zhang Zuolin's Fengtian clique. By now, Han Fuju had become commander of the Third Route of the Guominjun, which had been reorganized into the Second Collective Army under the NRA. The joint offensive of the NRA, Guominjun, and Shanxi (which had also joined the KMT's cause) quickly overrun Shandong. Feng Yuxiang's army was attacked by Fengtian troops in a battle at the Zhang River, and Feng ordered Han to join the battle. However, Han retreated after incurring heavy losses against the Fengtian forces, prompting Feng Yuxiang to institute a no-retreat order, on pain of death.

After repeated failed assaults on the Fengtian lines, Han reportedly threw himself to the ground and said: "Our only option now is to advance: otherwise, the Commander-in-Chief (Feng) will surely execute me. If I'm going to be shot anyway, I'd rather die here!" (Note: (in Chinese: 我们现在的情形是只有前进，否则总司令必定枪毙我，我与其被枪毙而死，不如即死在此处！)) Another account of this event has a similarly desperate Han threatening to jump into a river, only to be dissuaded by his own officers. In either case, this incident boosted the morale of his forces enough to break through the Fengtian defenses, which had collapsed by May. Han's armies subsequently advanced deep into Zhili, capturing Puyang, Xingtai, Daming, and Shimen.

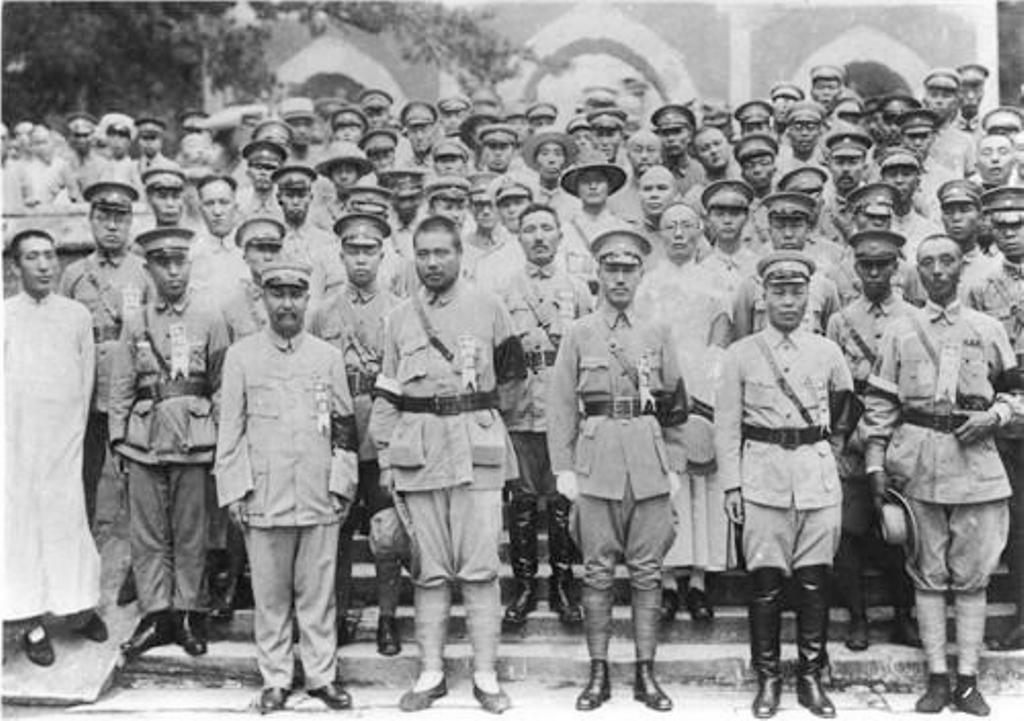
Top NRA commanders and officers including Chiang Kai-shek (center) and Feng Yuxiang (second from left) in Beijing on 6 July, 1928. The city had been captured beforehand by Han Fuju's army.

Feng Yuxiang resolved to reach Beijing before Yan Xishan or any other NRA force. By June 6, Han Fuju's army had reached Nanyuan, entering the city two days before Yan Xishan and earning him the nickname of the "Flying General" (飞将军). He thus became the first NRA commander to enter Beijing during the Northern Expedition.

However, Chiang Kai-shek of the Nanjing government had already entrusted the area to Yan Xishan, which meant that the Guominjun would have to leave Beijing. Han and Feng were both humiliated by this, but Feng ordered Han not to make his displeasure public.

In the spring of 1928, an international incident occurred in Beijing, when Han Fuju conducted an unauthorized disarmament of a brigade belonging to former Fengtian commander Bao Yulin, which had been withdrawing to Manchuria before being surrounded by Han's troops. This went against an agreement that the Nanjing government had conducted with foreign powers, assuring a peaceful and orderly withdrawal of Fengtian forces from Beijing. When envoys from Britain, the United States, Japan, and France attempted to negotiate the matter with Han, he refused all discussion, stating simply that the disarmament of the Fengtian army was an internal Chinese affair. During this incident, Han was also reportedly shirtless. Feng Yuxiang sent an urgent telegram to Nanjing, claiming that the disarmament happened before orders arrived and that it was not an intentional act of defiance on Han's part. Han was forced to release Bao Yulin's brigade and return the seized weapons, although not before incorporating some of its men into his army.

Han's growing ambitions were left unsatisfied by the Nationalists. Earlier in 1927, he had aimed to become the governor of Henan, but was displeased when Feng Yuxiang took the title and delegated it to other officers instead of him. He had also aimed to become Shandong governor, but once again, Feng Yuxiang nominated Sun Liangcheng, passing over Han. Han's biography asserts that both of these incidents increased his resentment towards Feng and belief that his career would stagnate under him.

In 1928, he aimed to become governor of his home province of Hebei, (Note: After the Northern Expedition, the Nationalists renamed Zhili to Hebei, and Beijing to Beiping.) believing his military exploits would be sufficient to secure him high office. To Han's greatest disappointment, Nanjing instead gave the post to Shang Zhen of the Shanxi clique, while Han was appointed as a member of the provincial government. He was reportedly so displeased by this position that he failed to appear on 4 July when the provincial government was officially established and its members took oaths of office.

The Nationalists had pursued a general demobilization and reorganization the army after the strain of the Northern Expedition and the warlord era. As part of this reform, the Guominjun was reduced in size, and Han Fuju became the commander of the 20th Division, with Sun Tongxuan serving under him. Feng Yuxiang attended the demobilization conference in Nanjing and called on all division commanders to join him: however, Han did not, instead sending Sun with a letter asking for soldiers' back pay. Feng angrily rejected Han's appeal, further deteriorating relations between the two warlords.

=== Rule in Henan under Feng ===
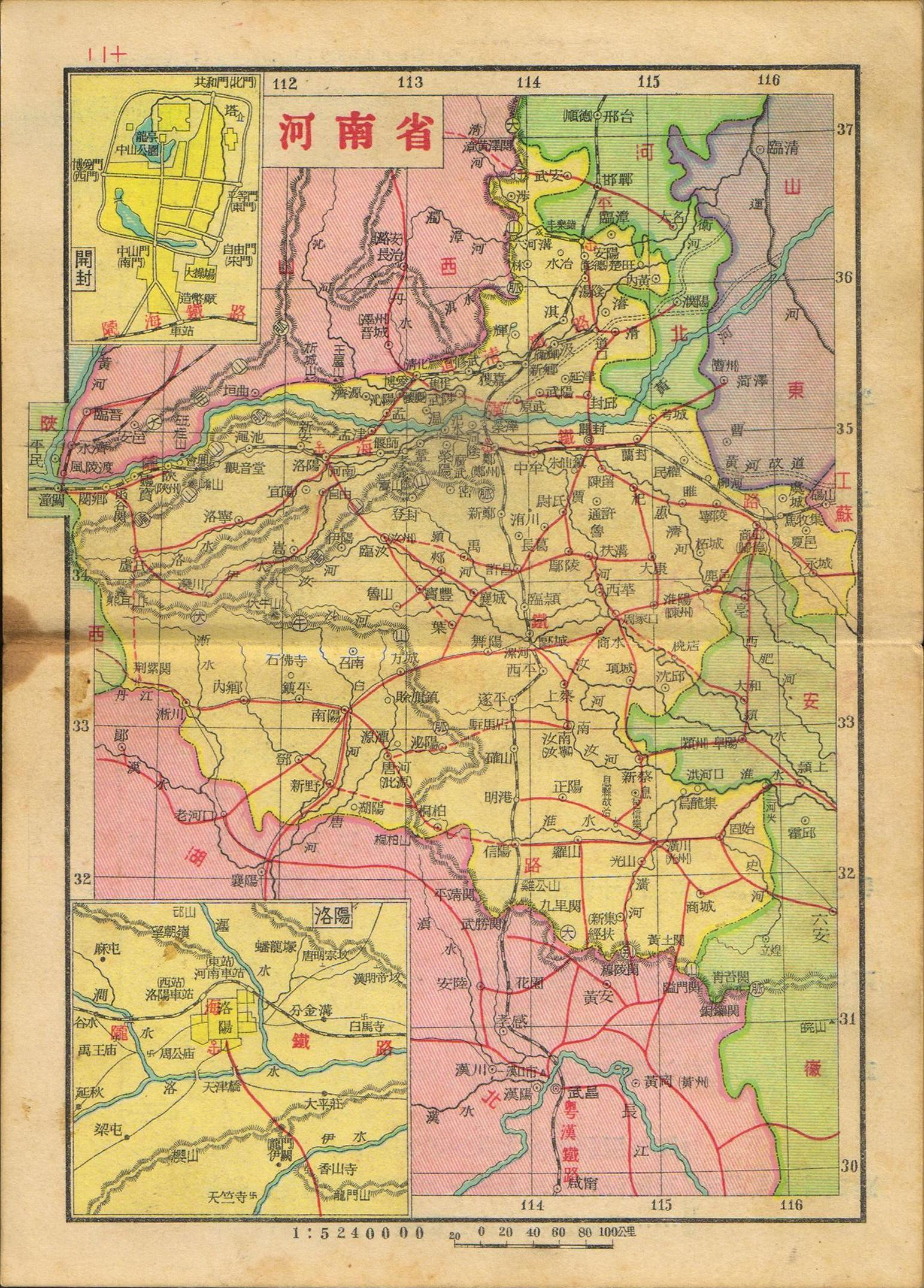
Han was appointed as governor of Henan (1936 map).

On 12 December 1928, Feng Yuxiang appointed Han as chairman of Henan, taking office on 21 December. Although Han had attained high office, his government consisted mainly of Feng's allies, including the civil affairs minister Deng Zhexi. In addition, Han was stripped of his command over the 20th Division, which was given to another Feng ally Shi Jingting. Shi replaced all of Han's appointed officers and publicly criticized Han's leadership of the division. Although Shi Jingting was later transferred away from that command, Han Fuju would later cite this incident as the main factor that caused him to defect from Feng Yuxiang.

Han's initial governance plan was elucidated on 31 December, which featured political inspection teams to evaluate and audit provincial officials for corruption. He also issued a slate of fiscal reforms; these included the abolishment of many miscellaneous taxes, a halt to the practice of collecting taxes in advance and a general standardization of financial records. To replace the abolished levies (especially the likin), Han introduced a special production tax and a business tax. He also introduced a sales tax, which was effectively a tariff on goods entering Henan. Several of Han's measures remained unimplemented due to the ensuing Central Plains War.

Han's continuing resentment of his situation as a powerless governor without a military command led to him neglecting administration. By early 1929, Han's many vices, including drinking, gambling, and womanizing, began to resuface as the governor staged 'inspection' trips to indulge in personal pleasure. This caught the attention of the disciplinarian Feng, who in February publicly criticized "high-ranking officials" for their decadence, also alluding to Han's concubinal relationship with an opera singer. According to Han's biography, this further heightened his feelings of embarrassment and humiliation. Another incident was when Feng reportedly ordered Han to stand guard for him in Luoyang for two hours.

=== Second defection ===
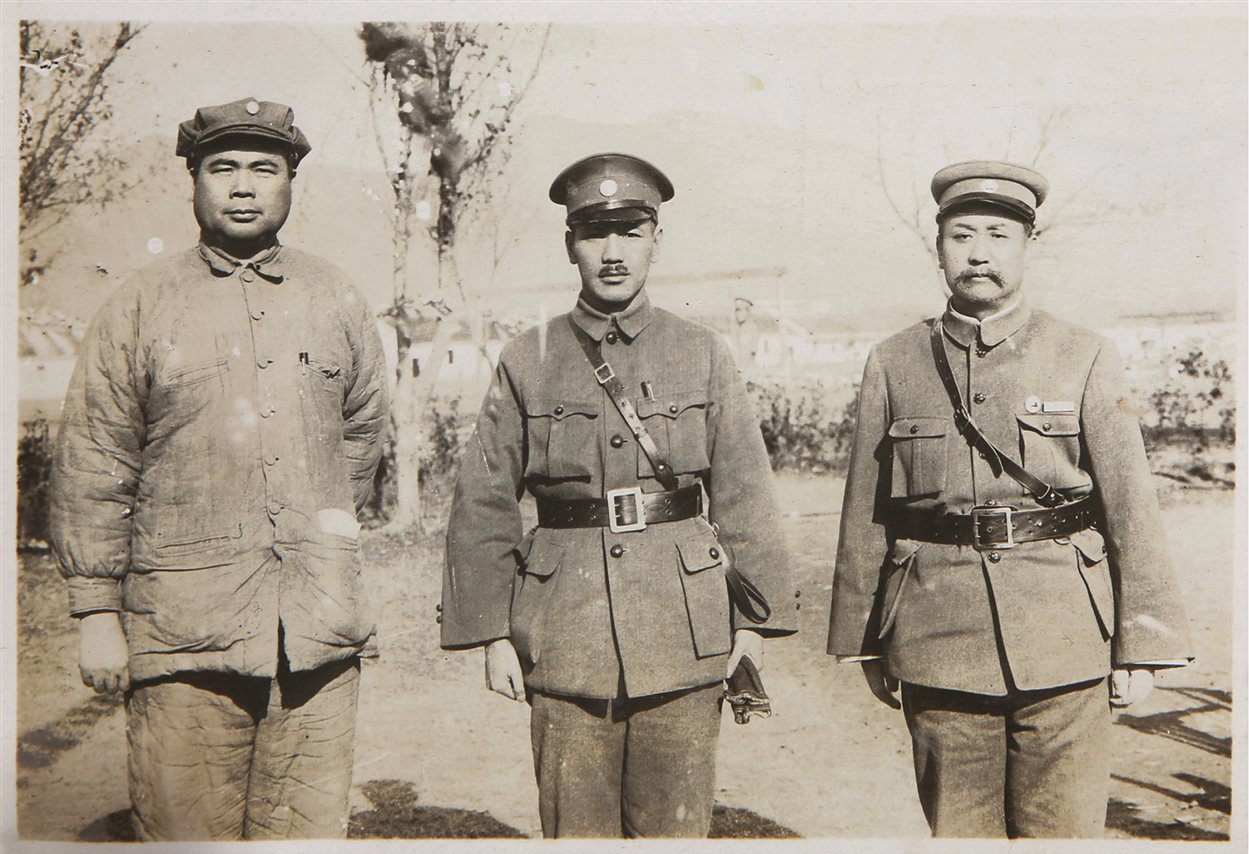
Han served at different times under Feng Yuxiang (left), Chiang Kai-shek (center), and Yan Xishan (right).

In March 1929, upon the outbreak of the Chiang–Gui War, the Nanjing government offered far-reaching concessions to the Guominjun, including control over Qingdao, a premiership for Feng Yuxiang, and the choice of either Anhui or Hubei as territory. Feng agreed to send a force of 130,000 soldiers to help Chiang, with Han Fuju as commander-in-chief; on 30 March Nanjing promptly appointed Han as commander of the 3rd Route Army of the NRA. Feng attempted to play both sides by ordering Han's army to advance at an extremely slow rate, such that by the time the war had ended, the army had only reached Xiaogan in Hubei. Because of Chiang's quick victory and Feng's nonexistent contribution, Nanjing rescinded all its agreed concessions to Feng's clique. However, Chiang launched a campaign to win over Han Fuju, inviting him to a meeting in Hankou on 11 April. Chiang employed several methods of flattery; calling Han the "Ever-Victorious General", (Note: (In Chinese: 常胜将军)) hosting a private banquet for him, and even offering him a cheque of several hundreds of thousands of yuan and a house in Shanghai. Later in April, Chiang and Han held a clandestine meeting at a location along the Beijing-Hankou Railway, where Chiang offered more gifts to Han and members of his staff.

Han's biography suggests that this was a calculated strategy by Chiang Kai-shek to break apart the Guominjun in preparation for a campaign against Feng. In mid-May, Feng convened his own conference in Huayin in order to prepare a defensive strategy for the coming war. When Feng proposed to withdraw all armies from Henan back into Shaanxi, Han refused to do so, leading Feng to angrily reprimand him in front of his entire general staff. This represented another humiliation, and once Han returned to Henan, he informed Liu Ruming of his intentions to desert.

Han secretly convened the officers of the 20th Division in Shanzhou, convincing them to march east from Gantang to Luoyang and claiming that it was other Feng's orders. In addition, Han also forced several Feng loyalists to board a train with him to Luoyang and sign a circular telegram officially announcing his break with Feng. On 22 May, Han declared his intention to maintain peace in Henan and his allegiance to the central government. Joining Han in his defection would be Shi Yousan, whom he had contacted beforehand. Also on 22 May, Chiang declared the beginning of the attack on Feng; he expelled Feng from the Kuomintang a day later and order Feng's arrest a day after that. For his defection, Han gained a sum of five million yuan from Chiang.

Han's defection did not go smoothly. In a series of confrontations at Heishiguan with the forces of general Pang Bingxun (who had stayed loyal to Feng), most of Han's 20th Division was wiped out. Nevertheless, he and the remnants of his army (around 2,000 men) had managed to enter Kaifeng, and was able to continue serving in his position of provincial governor under Chiang Kai-shek's government. There, he met with Soong Mei-ling, who once again bestowed Han with gifts and promised to grant equipment and money to rebuild his army. She also continued calling him the 'Ever-Victorious General', which was reportedly much to Han's liking. After a few months, Han's army had rebounded to about 30,000 men.

== With the Kuomintang ==
=== Rule in Henan under Chiang ===
Having joined Chiang Kai-shek's central government, Han now had a measure of freedom to rule in Henan. He removed Feng Yuxiang's men from their posts, instead staffing them with his own allies; for example, Li Shuchun, one of his trusted advisors, became civil affairs minister. Despite this, Han's biography notes that he largely continue following, implementing, and expanding on Feng's prior policies.

Han focused on building up an administrative cadre, tasking Li Shuchun to direct a training institute in Kaifeng. He adopted a Confucian, virtue-focused administrative style, which he explicitly stated was adopted from that of the Qing statesman and general Zeng Guofan. In this vein, Han called for increased discipline amongst the provincial government; in December 1929, Han ordered that all officials must wear uniforms, and in 1930, he issued a decree banning all New Year's celebrations amongst his staff. He discouraged smoking, gambling, and concubinage within the administration. He established a meritocratic system, punishing and rewarding officials based on their performance. Han's slogans for his officials, which he made mandatory to adhere to, were to "work tirelessly without complaint, maintain vitality, dedicate oneself to the people, and care not for money." (Note: (In Chinese: 任劳任怨，朝气在先，拚命为民，我不爱钱))

The province's financial situation had become even more strained, and Han endeavored to increase his revenue. He frequently issued orders to collect more taxes from the people, causing considerable unrest. He also established a government oversight committee to force the Zhongyuan Company, the largest coal-mining enterprise in Henan, to produce a daily quota of 20 tons of coal. Through these measures, he managed to earn 200,000 yuan within two months.

A program of infrastructure construction was also started. Because Henan was prone to droughts and floods, Han focused on water conservancy and flood control projects, including afforestation, canal construction and well digging. In the winter of 1929, he ordered the dredging of the Huiji and Jialu rivers. This had the added benefit of improving agriculture, which was another focus of Han's government. Han had encouraged farmers to adopt increased agricultural mechanization using machines produced by the provincial administration. Han also encouraged private industry, and for the Chinese diaspora to return and invest in his province. He supported the sericulture industry in Henan by purchasing 240,000 silkworm eggs and distributing them to several silk-producing areas in Nanyang. Han established the "Henan Gongji Automobile Company" as a government transportation service, ordering the construction of roads and telephone lines. Han's biography notes that although these were far-sighted measures, his government's capacity to implement them were limited. A report by the Provincial Construction Department in November 1929 also stated mixed results; several counties had not started construction works, and others had neglected rural areas.

Han maintained Feng Yuxiang's modernist and moralist social policies. This included a strict ban on opium production; if opium was found growing in a county, its officials were executed. He launched a campaign against foot-binding, ordering committees to unbind women's feet and cut hair he found to be too long. To increase control and administration over the countryside, Han invited Liang Shuming, a politician associated with the Rural Reconstruction Movement, to establish a Village Governance Academy in Huixian. Han's biography, written later in communist China, frames this in severely negative terms, claiming Liang's policies advocated reformism and were beneficial only to the landlord class. Nevertheless, Liang and many others in his team would subsuquently follow Han to Shandong and implement rural reconstruction there.

Han created a militia system to suppress banditry and pacify rural areas of the province. This included the formation of landlord militias to counter peasant unrest. In cooperation with the central government, he fought against the influence of the Communist Party by establishing rehabilitation centers for criminals, including many communists. Han issued arrest warrants for several communist leaders believed to be in the area, including Xu Xiangqian and Wang Shusheng.

=== Central Plains War ===
Han had attempted to form a bloc to counterbalance Chiang Kai-shek's influence, involving Shi Yousan and Ma Hongkui, but Chiang appointed the commanders to different areas to divide them. He also attempted contacts with Yan Xishan, Zhang Xueliang, Chen Diaoyuan, and Shang Zhen to diversify away from Chiang.

Han's strategy during the volatile political conflicts of 1929-30 between Chiang Kai-shek and various warlord coalitions was to attempt to wait them out without committing his forces to major combat. However, he soon found this balancing act impossible to maintain as war spread across more and more areas of China. When conflict again broke out between Feng Yuxiang and Chiang in October 1929, Han stayed neutral and refused to fight against his old boss. Then, in December, Shi Yousan and Tang Shengzhi launched a rebellion; Han was initially sympathetic to the rebels, but later sided with Chiang after Ma Hongkui and Yan Xishan did the same. Han then attempted to invite Yan, who by now had gained much power in northern China, to a meeting to arrest him, but Yan realized these plans and instead formed his own coalition against Chiang, involving Li Zongren, Feng Yuxiang, and several other warlords. This began the main stage of the Central Plains War.

Han Fuju and Shi Yousan had made a secret pact wherein they would join opposing sides of the war, so that they could help each other no matter who won. Shi would go over to Yan, who promised him governorship of Shandong. Han Fuju, fearful that his soldiers would defect back to Feng's side, asked Chiang to be transferred to Shandong to fight against Yan Xishan's forces, which was accepted in late March of 1930.

==== Setbacks in Shandong ====
Han's forces had been reorganized into the First Army Corps, responsible for the entire Shandong region. Initially based in Jining, Han's command now included the 21st Division of Liu Zhennian in the Jiaodong area, but Liu was known to be an unreliable commander. On 18 April, Han moved his headquarters to the capital Jinan.

The situation of the Central Plains War in May 1930. Blue indicates the Nanjing government of Chiang Kai-shek, and yellow indicates the anti-Chiang coalition. Han Fuju fought on the Nanjing government's side.

Han's basic orders were to hold the south bank of the Yellow River and prevent the Shanxi forces from advancing along the Tianjin-Pukou Railway. The Shanxi forces, led by Yan Xishan and later Fu Zuoyi, started the assault down the railway in early May. Because Han's army had exhausted itself from the march into Shandong, its performance struggled. Chiang gave persmission for Han to retreat across the Yellow River and dismantle the bridge to slow the Shanxi advance. However, by then, Yan's forces had already begun crossing the Yellow River at Dong'e to threaten Han's rear. On 2 June, as the Jinan bridge was being dismantled, enemy artillery bombardment led to the Jinan Arsenal exploding. This threw Han's troops further into disarray, and he resolved to retreat east into Jiaodong. On 24 June, facing a major attack and receiving no reinforcement, Han decided to abandon his base in Jinan; by then, Shanxi had managed to cut it off from Tai'an, thereby threatening an encirclement.

Han's biography states that Han decided to retreat eastward rather than southward (to the bulk of the NRA lines) to preserve his military strength. If Han had retreated southward, he would have been forced to fight, losing the bulk of his army (and thus, power). Conversely, retreating eastward meant freedom of movement and action. After retreating, Han made the excuse that fighting for Jinan would have exposed foreign consulates to damage, potentially leading to a new international incident much like what had happened during the Northern Expedition.

Han moved his headquarters to Weixian, establishing a new defensive line on the east bank of the Zihe River. His situation was still precarious: although he had managed to defend against the Shanxi army, Liu Zhennian in his rear was rumored to have contacts with Yan Xishan, and Shanxi had already hired bandits to disrupt him, essentially surrounding Han's forces on all sides. Han had already told his staff that if they were unable to fight Shanxi directly, they could instead become bandits in the Yimeng Mountains. Han decided, with the consent of Chiang's advisors, to contact Shi Yousan and Feng Yuxiang and pretend to join their side; in reality, this was a delaying tactic to relieve the pressure on his army. However, he was attacked by the army of Zhang Yinwu and forced to retreat again. On 28 July, Han announced his resignation, withdrawing further east across the Weihe River and again moving his headquarters to Gaomi.

Han seriously considered the plan to fight guerrilla warfare in the Yimeng Mountains before his division commanders convinced him to stand ground; Han's resignation already having significantly deteriorated morale. Because Yan Xishan had devoted so many forces to containing Han Fuju, his offensive along the Tianjin-Pukou Railway stalled, allowing Chiang to build up forces for a counteroffensive. This included the 16th Army of general Li Yunheng (李韞珩), which landed at Qingdao on 3 August via sea from Shanghai to reinforce Han's flagging lines.

==== Counteroffensive and appointment as chairman ====
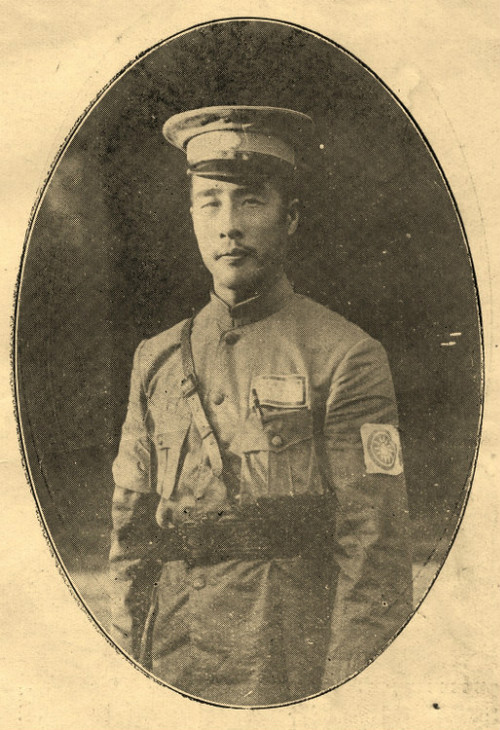
Han Fuju as a commander in 1930

Chiang's counterattack began on 1 August; on that same day, his liaisons managed to convince Han to rescind his resignation. After that, Liu Zhennian also agreed to follow Han's command. Han's own counterattack began on 7 August, with him personally supervising the battle. By 10 August, Weixian had been recaptured and the Shanxi forces were in full retreat. Zichuan was retaken on 12 August. Although Han had hoped to reach Jinan before Chiang's main force, the 19th Route Army of Jiang Guangnai and Cai Tingkai had already captured it by 15 August, two days before he arrived.

On 21 August, Chiang arrived in Jinan to convene his generals; despite Han's preparations to cross the Yellow River, Chiang ordered no offensive, as heavy fighting was still ongoing in Henan. The anti-Chiang coalition completely collapsed in September, when Zhang Xueliang in Manchuria declared his support for the central government. This set off a chain reaction; Shi Yousan stopped fighting, and Ma Hongkui defected. By November, the Guominjun had been defeated and dissolved, with Han Fuju integrating some of its remnants. Due to Han's mediation, Shi Yousan was able to keep his army.

On 5 September 1930, the Nationalist government appointed Han Fuju as governor of Shandong. He assumed office on 9 September.

== Rule in Shandong ==
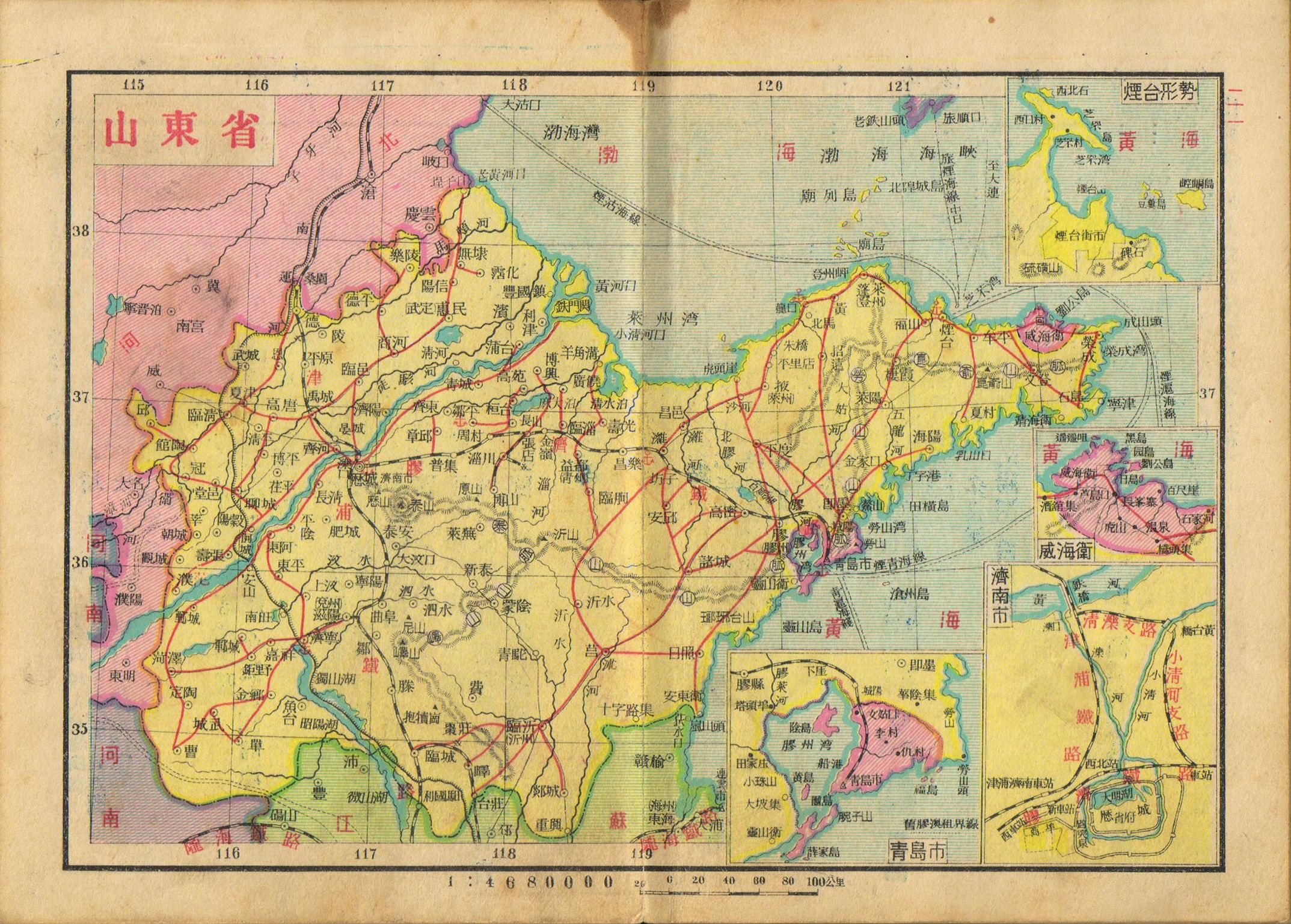
Han Fuju ruled Shandong (1936 map) as a personal domain.

Although Chiang Kai-shek had been reluctant to appoint Han Fuju on account of his behavior during the Shandong campaign, general Cao Haosen convinced him to keep his word, as Chiang had already promised the province to Han.

=== Ideology ===
Han's personal views have been described by historian Lü Weijun as "complex and contradictory," drawing influences from most mainstream contemporary schools of thought. Although he opposed communism, he praised the Comintern for seeking "world harmony" and evaluated the communist ideology as "seeking happiness for the majority." Another ideology Han claimed was seeking happiness for the majority was fascism, calling Nazi Germany's conscription system and its capital controls egalitarian. He praised the development of capitalist countries and consistently called for learning their methods; he also advocated the Three Principles of the People.

However, the largest influence on Han's thought by far was Confucianism and the restoration of traditional morality. Han believed in a Confucian revival to bring the Chinese people back onto the "right track" after the collapse of old society during the Warlord Era. Furthermore, he believed that this collapse had let in many new schools of thought that have led the Chinese astray. During his rule of Shandong, Han consistently called on officials to emulate the governance of the Hongwu Emperor. He also continued idolizing and quoting Zeng Guofan, Hu Linyi, and Yuan Shikai to provide inspiration for his Confucian and Mencian methods of governmental and military organization.

=== Government ===
Han's new government included many of his previous allies and advisors; this included Li Shuchun maintaining the role of civil affairs minister from his time in Henan. The only Shandong native was He Siyuan, who maintained his role as education minister. Although Han wanted to remove him, He had good relations with Chiang Kai-shek, who refused Han's requests for removal. He eventually also built up ties with Han, and would help consolidate Han's rule over the province.

Several of Han's ministers were deeply corrupt and sycophantic; this included secretary-general Zhang Shaotang (张绍堂) and Finance Commissioner Wang Xiangrong (王向荣), who was both economically illiterate and as greedy as Zhang. Even Zhang Honglie, Han's construction director, was known to be corrupt at times.

Han also put together an advisory council consisting of former Guominjun officers and landed gentry, which he essentially used as a think tank. Another major ally of Han was Liang Shuming, who became his senior political advisor.

=== Consolidating power ===
Han's initial position in Shandong was precarious, as Chiang Kai-Shek, Zhang Xueliang, and Liu Zhennian all coveted his province; thus, Han needed to deal with all three factions to consolidate his rule over the region. Zhang's Fengtian clique owned the major port of Qingdao, Liu controlled the Jiaodong area, and the central government sought to replace Han with a more pliant candidate. In addition, Zhang Zongchang, Shandong's past governor, had returned to China and there was speculation he may attempt to take back power.

After Feng Yuxiang's defeat and retirement, Han invited his old mentor to stay in the Mount Tai area. Feng made two stays in Shandong from 1931 to 1935, leaving once in 1933 to conduct a failed anti-Japanese resistance movement in Chahar before returning. The reasons for this offer are unknown, although Han's biography supplies the explanations that Han desired Feng's assistance against Chiang and other external threats, and that Han sought to make amends for his prior defection. Han provided Feng with around five hundred bags of flour and five thousand yuan monthly to pay Feng's remaining force of five hundred men. Feng would also assist in bandit suppression activities, and Han would consult Feng for advice. Perhaps fearing that they may be influenced by Feng, Han forbade his subordinates from visiting Feng.

==== Dealing with Chiang and Zhang ====
Han's first crisis came in January 1931, when Chiang ordered the transfer of Han's Third Route Army (as well as some other armies) south in preparation for an encirclement campaign against the Jiangxi Soviet. To replace the Third Route Army's garrisons, forces from Zhang Xueliang's Northeastern Army would be brought in, and according to Han's biography, Northeast Army general Wang Shuchang would have become Shandong governor in such an eventuality. Han managed to defuse this immediate threat by convincing the reluctant general Sun Lianzhong to go to Jiangxi instead. To pacify Chiang, he executed several Communist prisoners on 5 April, including Deng Enming, a founding member of the Communist Party. This pleased the central government enough to abandon the plan of transferring Han, and he was instead promoted to head of a bandit suppression headquarters in Shandong on 7 July.

In June 1931, Zhang Xueliang moved several of the Northeast Army's assets from Manchuria to Hebei. Han, interpreting it as a threat to his domain, sent thirty to forty thousand troops under Ma Hongkui's 15th Army north of the Yellow River. No invasion occurred. In September 1931, the Japanese staged the Mukden Incident and Japan's Kwantung Army invaded Manchuria. This crippled Zhang Xueliang's power, and in November, a major mutiny against the Fengtian clique broke out in Qingdao. Although the mutiny (and Han's attempt to support it) was unsuccessful, a new government under Fengtian admiral Shen Honglie took power in the city after difficult negotiations. Shen's administration was compliant towards Han, and the city's tax revenue was split 50-50 with the Shandong government. Han and Zhang Xueliang's relations would later improve on the mutual basis of maintaining power and resisting the central government's attempts to assert control, with Zhang even granting Han a residence in Beiping. Therefore, Han had managed to subdue two out of three main foreign threats to his rule without direct combat.

==== Zhang Zongchang incident ====
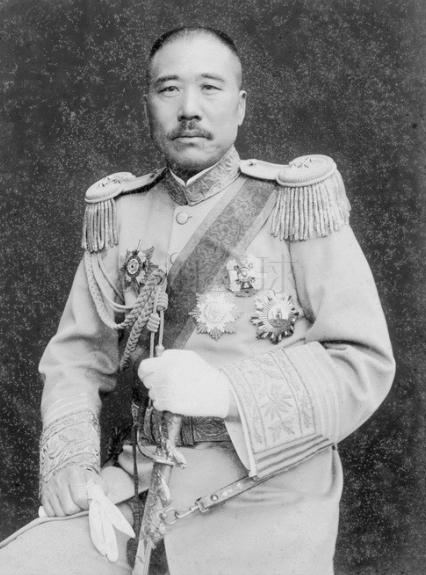
Zhang Zongchang, the former Shandong governor and warlord.

Han Fuju has been implicated in the assassination of past Shandong governor Zhang Zongchang by multiple contemporary and retrospective sources. The basic narrative of Zhang's assassination is that Zhang returned to China intending to organize resistance against Japan, although he had previously been supported by the Japanese. On 3 September, Zhang met with Han Fuju and Shi Yousan, and would later be fatally shot at the Jinan railway station by Zheng Jicheng, the nephew of a Guominjun general whom Zhang had executed.

Han's biography asserts that Han feared Zhang's residual influence, as Zhang was a Shandong native with a power base in the province and a history of attempting a return through armed rebellion. In addition, as several of Zhang's old subordinates were now serving in the NRA, Zhang's potential comeback could pose a threat to Chiang Kai-shek as well. Han supposedly coordinated with Chiang's advisors to carry out the plot of luring Zhang back to Jinan where he could then be assassinated.

Han reportedly managed to convince Zhang to return to Shandong through contacting one of Zhang's old associates, who met with Zhang and informed the former warlord that Han admired Zhang and desired his cooperation. Han and Shi Yousan arrived at Beiping in 24 July and made several promises to Zhang, including help rebuilding Zhang's army and the appointment of Zhang as "Commander-in-Chief of Bandit Suppression in Shandong" After the meeting, Zhang agreed to come to Shandong.

Han allegedly wrote to Feng Yuxiang for advice: as Zhang had fought the Guominjun in the past, Feng agreed to join the plot and suggested utilizing Zheng Jicheng to assassinate him. Feng has also been implicated in the plot by multiple other sources. On 29 August, Shi and Han sent another telegram to Zhang urging him to come to Jinan, which he did on 2 September. Shi and Han hosted a lavish banquet for Zhang, flattering him and lowering his guard with prostitutes and card games, while also diverting Zhang's staff with opium to keep them from investigating. Han censored press reports regarding Zhang's arrival and spread the rumor that he had gone to his ancestral home in Ye County to attend to filial matters, drawing attention away from Jinan. Han also instructed Shi to take away Zhang's pistol, which he did.

On 3 September, Han informed Zhang to return to Beiping and wait for an official appointment from the central government. Han then gave the order to Zheng Jicheng and stationed a contingent of troops surrounding the Jinan station in case the plan failed. The assassination went smoothly, and Han would later lobby to Nanjing for Zheng's release from custody, which was achieved in January 1933.

=== Han-Liu War ===
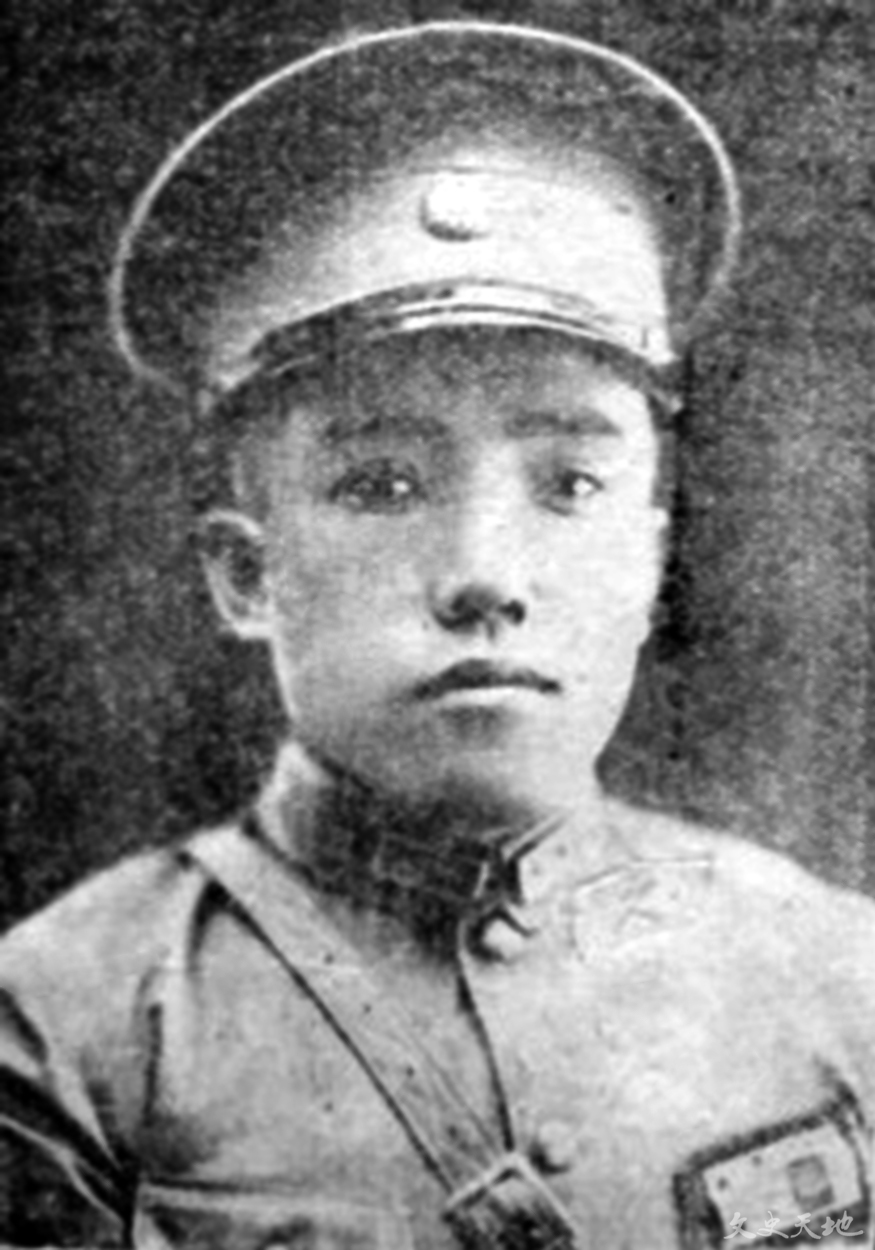
Liu Zhennian, the ruler of eastern Shandong.

==== Road to war ====
By late September 1932, Han had managed to eliminate most of his rivals, except for Liu Zhennian's independent domain in the Shandong Peninsula. Known as the "King of Eastern Shandong", Liu and his 21st Division had around 20–30,000 men, organized into four brigades, four regiments, and two battalions based in the port of Yantai (Chefoo). Liu's lands, totalling twelve counties, were also productive, with a monthly revenue of around 1 million yuan. Liu collected this independently, sending a portion of these funds to Nanjing and nothing to the provincial government.

Another major dispute occurred over military funding: after initial maximalist demands, Han's final offer to Liu was 120,000 yuan monthly to pay his 21st Division, but Liu insisted on the figure of 145,000 yuan. Sometime in the lead-up to war, Liu had also attempted to assassinate Han, but this plot was discovered. As both sides readied their forces, Liu began levying more and more exorbitant taxes, including raising the quarterly land tax and implementing a "special military supply tax". In January 1931, the Shandong branch of the Communist Party claimed that the taxes in Liu's domain had become even higher than they were under Zhang Zongchang. These incidents gave Han a liberatory pretext, and in several telegrams to Nanjing in September 1932, he claimed to be relieving the people from crushing tax burdens.

Han's biography asserts that Han had always intended to unify the province, and Liu's presence was a major obstacle in this goal; therefore, Han launched a campaign to remove him.

On 20 September, while the war was already underway, Han sent Liu an ultimatum containing three major demands: to pay Han's government 500,000 yuan monthly; to turn over control of five to six counties to Han; and to turn over control of the area's tax bureaus to Han. Liu ignored these demands.

==== Course of the war ====
In August 1932, Han received reports of a major uprising against Liu planned for September; when Han attempted to move troops into Liu's territories to counter this supposed threat, Liu rejected entry and mobilized his forces. War broke out on 17 September, when Liu attacked Han's troops at Changyi. By 19 September, Han had seized Pingdu and Liu's army was in full retreat. On that same day, Chiang Kai-shek and He Yingqin learned of the war's outbreak and ordered both sides to stop fighting; however, Han ignored the telegram.

After this rebuff, Chiang attempted to attack Han by ordering two armies to launch a joint offensive against him: Liu Zhi northwards from Xuzhou and Shang Zhen southwards from Hebei. However, Zhang Xueliang intervened by declaring his support for Han and sending an artillery regiment to bolster Han's forces, leading Chiang to abort his planned assault. Nanjing then attempted to mediate peace, but Han stalled the negotiations long enough to capture Liu's base at Yantai on 24 September, forcing Liu to retreat to Qixia. By October, Liu only had control of four counties in Shandong.

On 19 October, He Yingqin issued the central government's four-point peace plan. It stipulated that Han withdraw west of the Weihe River, Liu's forces remain in control of five Shandong counties, and local militias administer the other seven in dispute anticipating a final mediation by Nanjing. Han vehemently rejected this and publicly threatened resignation as Governor on 21 October. He also maintained military pressure by besieging Liu in Qixian and Laiyang.

It was feared by many in China that Han's resignation could lead to an escalation of conflict in Shandong, even causing a Japanese intervention. Han's threat caused an outpouring of support for him, including senior Kuomintang officials and generals Zhang Qun, Liu Zhi, Zhang Xueliang, and Song Zheyuan urging him to stay. Kuomintang elder Ding Weifen and Green Gang leader Zhang Renkui, backed by the gentry and merchants, spoke in favor of peace in Shandong, causing more pressure on Chiang.

On 25 October, Liu telegraphed Nanjing and offered to leave Shandong. Han accepted peace on 29 October and rescinded his resignation; his troops subsequently withdrew west of the Weihe River to allow Liu and his men to evacuate from Yantai on 22 November. Liu's exit from Shandong meant that Han could now appoint loyal magistrates, collect taxes, and organize militias in Jiaodong, effectively unifying the province. With all of the threats to Han's rule subdued, he could thus focus on internal governance.

=== Administration ===
According to writer Frank Dorn, Han's governance in Shandong had strong disciplinarian qualities, reactively issuing laws and meting out "harsh" punishments. Han's 1997 biography asserts that Han was a "local tyrant" who nevertheless appealed to good governance and popular welfare unlike Zhang Zongchang.

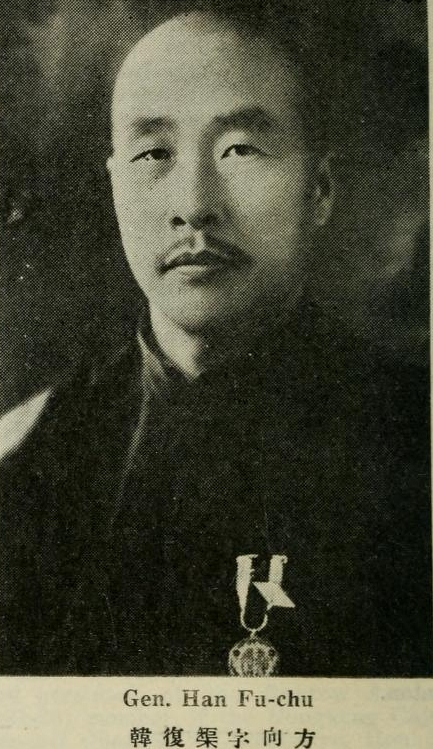
Han Fuju around 1933

Han's initial four-point plan, elucidated on 15 September 1930, called for cleaning up officialdom, clearing the countryside from banditry (including communism), strict prohibitions on drugs, and popularizing education. He also stipulated that his officials "be pragmatic, be hardworking, and be persevering." Han ordered his civil servants to write big-character posters summarizing his philosophy of governance, and to post them publicly.

Han's disiciplinarianism extended to his officials' work schedules; all government workers were required to attend early morning assemblies and to read newspapers in the afternoon. These assemblies included Han himself or local officials reporting on the state of county affairs, as well as state-sanctioned reverence of Sun Yat-sen. Han imposed a strict dress code (summer and winter uniforms, as well as hair restrictions) and punishments for tardiness: in an incident on 6 January 1931, he made a surprise inspection of the Jinan municipal government, and ordered its dissolution when its members failed to appear for a roll call. In 1932, he also fired many Pingyin County officials for being twelve minutes late to a morning assembly. Han once berated an old official for walking instead of running to morning assemblies, leading to the official's resignation.

Han also called for his civil servants to be physically fit, ordering them to practice Tai chi and Shaolin kung fu. During inspections, he fired those he found to be too old or frail. In a speech on 29 June 1935, Han said that civil servants with knowledge but no strength were "like a radio with a microphone" because they could only make noise and not move. Han also issued decrees banning a slew of vices for his officials, ranging from soliciting prostitution to "extravagance" to traveling by car or giving year-end gifts. Han also prohibited officials from joining other political parties than the Kuomintang. A system of rewards and punishments was implemented based on behavior and merit; rewards came in the form of medals and monetary bonuses, while punishments came in the form of permanent dismissal. Han had forbidden dismissed politicians from seeking public office again, and regularly published the names of dismissed officials to spread awareness.

To vet county magistrates, Han formed inspection teams in October 1930 and again in February 1933. These teams reported directly to Han, and in many respects functioned as his secret police apparatus. According to Han's biography, these teams did reduce crime as people became aware of their activities, but in some cases, officials colluded directly with investigators to escape punishment. In addition to his inspection teams, Han also personally conducted various inspection tours, which eventually came to cover all of Shandong's counties. The scope of such tours was broad, with Han frequently offering on-the-spot guidance and convening impromptu court cases. Han also sought to maintain a positive public image through these tours, bestowing gifts on the needy and penalizing officials he saw to be unsatisfactory.

A training institute, with Han as director, was formed in 1930 in order to establish a new administrative cadre. Han frequently visited the institute to hold speeches and discuss policy. The facility itself was heavily militarized, as it was under the military's control and its students were made to conduct drills every morning in alignment with Han's governance philosophy.

==== Corruption ====
Han attempted to fight against corruption, ordering the execution of those who embezzled more than 500 yuan, although these limits were arbitrarily lowered depending on Han's personal mood at the time. From September 1930 to July 1931, Han fired 55 county magistrates (more than half of all magistrates) and 158 other civil servants for corruption. However, despite these stern measures and an outward appearance of control, corruption and bribery continued to flourish in Shandong. Corrupt petty officials, cognizant of Han's severe penalties, chose instead to bribe either Wang Xiangrong or Zhang Shaotang, who tampered with official documents to clear their names. In 1936, Han moved to remove Wang from his post; however, he relented after being informed by advisors that a replacement could be even more corrupt.

Zhang Shaotang, Han's secretary-general, required every county magistrate to give him a monetary bribe on taking office. Zhang would also recommend magistrates to hire nonexistent officials to positions; in reality, this was essentially a monthly payment to him of around 100 yuan. Every month, Zhang earned around 10,000 yuan from Shandong's many counties. Even Han's first wife, Gao Yizhen, colluded with corrupt officials, but this was a risky prospect: the director of Shandong's stamp bureau, who had collaborated with Gao, was forced to suicide after Han was informed by Nanjing of discrepancies in financial documents. Han's wife had informed him of the whole story, forcing Han to act before the official could reveal his family's involvement in corruption.

Han himself has never been conclusively implicated in corruption; despite contemporary author Jing Shiren writing in the 1939 book A Chronicle of Han Fuju's Seven-Year Misrule of Shandong (韓復榘禍魯七年罪惡錄) that he had embezzled tens of millions of yuan, Han's biography notes its unreliability, and the fact that Jing wrote the book only two years after Han's execution by the Nationalist government.

==== Judiciary ====
Han was known for personally overseeing court cases, which he essentially judged on an ad hoc basis. Han's methods were inspired by his reading of gong'an fiction, particularly the exploits of the Song-era justice Bao Zheng, who was famed for his incorruptibility. For this habit, he was nicknamed "Justice Han", or Qingtian (韩青天), a reference to Bao Zheng's own title. This was originally a sarcastic nickname, but Han took a liking to it and attempted to promote it.

Han's trials usually took place on Saturdays or Wednesdays, with no civilians permitted to attend them. Han's judgements usually consisted of either execution—during which he would gesture to his right—or release, accompanied by a gesture to the left. Release could also be accompanied by a penalty of fines or caning. These rulings were almost never reversible, aside from an incident where Han reversed a woman's death penalty because her child had clung to his leg and he was unable to remove them. Han's trials prioritized speed and efficiency, such that many cases were concluded in a matter of moments. After Han had made his decision, he would occasionally ride a bicycle around the courtroom before resting. Naturally, these judgements had an extremely arbitrary quality.

Han Fuju's judicial interference is exemplified by his handling of the Zhu Shude (朱淑德) case in 1931. Zhu had committed suicide; the act was ruled as such by a local court, but Han intervened and declared her husband to have forged her suicide note and murdered her, sentencing the husband to execution. This caused a major national sensation, during which Han attempted to bribe newspapers with 100 yuan so they would stop reporting on the case. Eventually, the matter was brought to the Supreme Court in Nanjing, which overturned Han's ruling and exonerated Zhu's husband. Despite this, Han continued hearing court cases.

Prison conditions in Shandong were generally poor and unsanitary, to the point where Han locked the Zhangqiu County court president in one so that, according to Han, he could also experience them. The Kuomintang's judicial reforms resulted in the construction of "new-style" prisons: the only difference of these prisons being their larger size, Shandong constructed the most new-style prisons out of any province in China. Han regularly ordered the execution of long-term prisoners in order to reduce overcrowding in prisons; on special occasions, general amnesties were instead declared where minor offenders were released following Han's personal interrogation.

==== Military ====
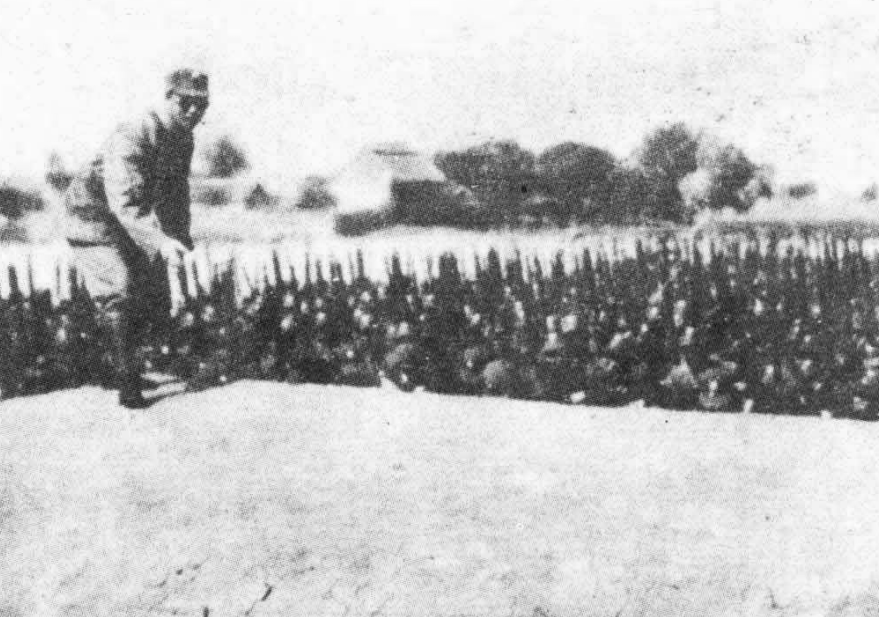
Han Fuju addresses troops in a drill, depicted in The Young Companion.

Han steadily built up his military, the Third Route Army, over the course of his rule in Shandong. His initial army of 20,000 men had reached a peak size of over 100,000 by 1937. Each of Han's five divisions had a party branch of the KMT to ensure political control. Han was also reportedly influenced by Feng Yuxiang's organizational methods.

In a 1931 expansion, Han's army was increased to 60,000 men (estimated by foreign observers in 1932 to be approximately 56,000) despite Nanjing's orders to demobilize 20,000 troops. Throughout this period, Han's core division remained under the control of his ally, Sun Tongxuan.

Han's armament included three artillery regiments and two armored train units. Han had dismantled his cavalry brigade in 1934 due to a lack of financial resources and its ineffectiveness in bandit suppression. Han had also purchased two American fighter planes in Qingdao, but these were later confiscated by the central government. He repaired airfields across the province and established a training school under Sun Tonggang (Note: Sun Tonggang (孙桐岗) was a prominent pilot in China and the younger brother of Sun Tongxuan.) for his rudimentary aviation arm, which consisted of one Klemm L 26 and at least one Avro Avian IVM as of March 1935. These planes were also used as makeshift bombers against bandits. In 1934, Han attempted to purchase six DH.82 Tiger Moths, but he was unable to obtain an import permit from Nanjing and efforts to smuggle them in failed.

In September 1930, Han organized four militia armies, which assisted his standing military in anti-bandit operations and was funded independently of the central government. Another unit was established in Liaodong in 1933 after the war with Liu Zhennian, bringing the final amount to five armies totalling around 12,000 men. Aside from the militias, Han established other paramilitary organizations as part of the Rural Reconstruction Movement, training tens of thousands of rural villagers. Han's training regimen was thorough and—much like other aspects of his rule—focused on discipline above all else. Although Chiang Kai-shek attempted to influence Han's troops by making them attend training sessions outside of Shandong, Han promptly had them retrain in Jinan.

Han reportedly admired the fascist leaders Hitler and Mussolini, calling them "heroes" for their successful military buildup and claiming that China should follow suit.

==== Anti-banditry campaigns ====
Han is credited with the virtual eradication of banditry in Shandong. Before he had taken power, banditry had been extremely rampant in the province, to the point of its description as a "bandit hotspot". Shandong's bandit population in 1930 was put by historian Phil Billingsley at over 200,000 due to war and the administration of Zhang Zongchang.

Han's main anti-banditry strategies involved social and administrative reforms paired with unrelenting military campaigns. He also hired several former bandit leaders to head investigation and suppression teams. The task of bandit suppression was generally a local affair to be handled by county magistrates, but larger groups were handled by the military. Han implemented a firearm registration system to halt the spread of banditry; any unregistered weapons were confiscated by the government.

In March 1931, Han personally launched a campaign against bandits in the area of the Baodugou mountains. His forces surrounded the mountains to prevent escape and set fires to burn away cover. This was successful, leading to a 70% reduction in banditry by early May; captured bandits were either executed or incorporated into Han's army. Throughout Han's reign, similar campaigns were launched against other minor bandit leaders, causing their flight or annihilation.

In December 1931, Han attempted to incorporate Liu Guitang's bandit army of around 10,000 men, but disputes soon arose between the two sides and Liu had fled into Hebei by June 1932. Liu returned to Shandong in March 1934 before being defeated at Wande. Although Liu's army had been destroyed, he managed to escape to Tianjin, which reportedly greatly annoyed Han.

Han was involved in mass executions of dozens of surrendered or captured bandits and suspected bandits at a time, often indiscriminately.

==== Anti-communism ====
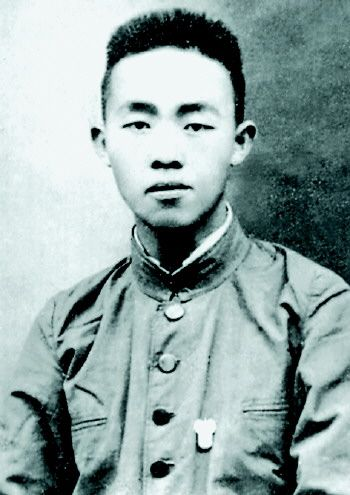
Deng Enming, one of the founders of the Communist Party, was executed in 1931 by Han's government.

Han maintained a strong anti-communist stance throughout the early and middle portions of his rule, leading suppression and propaganda campaigns against "communist bandits." Han worked with defectors from the Communist Party as well as members of the nationalist Young China Party (YCP) to infiltrate communist organizations and hunt down activists and militants. Although the communist defectors were highly effective, the participation of the YCP was controversial, as their operatives were much less skilled and even interfered with the government's own operations. They also aroused the anger of the central government, which had not yet legalized the YCP. Han eventually disbanded the YCP's espionage unit in the spring of 1933.

Later in 1933, he set up a Suppression Committee to coordinate anti-communist activities, led by him and Zhang Weicun. Han also continued his Hunan-era policies by establishing a rehabilitation center for communist prisoners in Jinan. He repressed the labor movement, banning all kinds of unions (even KMT-aligned ones) and forcefully breaking strikes. In 1935, Han suppressed student protests sympathizing with the December 9th Movement, believing them to be communist-influenced.

Many communist and communist-aligned organizations were dismantled by Han's government, with its members arrested or executed. In 1932, Han's police arrested the activist Pan Fusheng. The year after, he dismantled the Communist Shandong Provincial Committee in February by arresting its leader Ren Zuomin. While the communists attempted to rebuild the committee under Zhang Entang, Zhang would also be arrested in May 1933.

Han's biography, written in mainland China, admits that these arrests inflicted "catastrophic" damage on the Party's organizational network in Shandong, cutting the Shandong communists off from the Central Committee as well as forcing the Shandong Committee to halt its activities for two years.

Several abortive communist uprisings were put down over the 1932-33 period, in the areas of Boxing, Yidu, Rizhao, and Cangshan. According to Chinese sources, the July 1933 Cangshan uprising was said to have occurred because Han had attempted to build "Xiangfang City" (Note: (In Chinese: 向方城); the naming was reportedly an initiative of Zhang Weicun.) (after his courtesy name) in the area, extorting taxes from local peasants to fund it. Later, in November 1935, a rebellion in Jiaodong under Zhang Lianzhu occurred, but this was also defeated. During the final encirclement campaign against the Jiangxi Soviet, Han dispatched the 74th Division under commander Li Hanzhang (李汉章) to help defeat the communists.

Han's relations with the communists began to improve after 1935 as the threat of Japan increased and pro-Nanjing officials (especially Zhang Weicun) were eliminated by Han. In that year, the communists began rebuilding their provincial party organs, although they still faced government repression. Han would later join the Second United Front, which allowed the communists to infiltrate his army.

=== Social policies ===
Children playing sports in Yantai, Shandong (1935 image). Han Fuju's educational system placed an emphasis on sport and physical fitness.

Han adopted several of the central government's directives, mainly to strengthen his rule. In 1933, he took steps towards implementing the baojia (neighborhood watch) system that had been decreed by Nanjing the prior year. The baojia was to conduct a monthly census, monitor residents' activities, assist in bandit suppression activities, and provide conscripts and compulsory labor for public works. Han's version of the baojia took on the role of a joint household registration and surveillance system: when one person in the baojia committed a crime, everyone else would be punished as to encourage good behavior amongst citizens. In addition, only property owners could become chiefs of the baojia, effectively limiting the position to well-off classes. Han's biography states this was his main method of control over the populace, but asserts that this was resented by the poor.

In February 1934, Chiang Kai-shek launched the New Life Movement in Nanchang. As the New Life Movement was essentially a mass campaign to promote Confucian values (the Four Principles and Eight Virtues), Han quickly latched onto it, officially declaring its arrival in Shandong by creating a provincial association dedicated to its implementation on 1 April 1934. He would later establish a women's branch of the New Life Movement under the auspices of his wife.The main effect of Han's adoption of the movement was to make his already-strict governance even more rigorous.

As part of Han's cultural and social views, he established martial arts institutions across Shandong and issued orders to protect and document historical relics. He also organized sports competitions in Jinan, requiring every county in the province to send representatives.

Han launched many campaigns against vice, with varying effects. His efforts against gambling failed after gambling dens renamed themselves to "clubs"; most officials and people continued to gamble in secret. Similar campaigns against prostitution and foot-binding, although progressive, were generally left unimplemented in rural areas.

One of Han's personal crusades was against what he viewed as "strange clothing" for women. In May 1936, Han banned short sleeves, short pants, tight-fitting clothes, high heels, and curled hair for their perceived immorality, arresting those he found in Jinan violating these directives. In order to ensure they were followed, Han decreed that prostitutes must wear "strange clothing" and curl their hair; thus, many women chose to dress modestly to avoid being associated with prostitution.

Han had an antagonistic relationship with the media, starting in 1930 when journalists reportedly made fun of him after he professed an ignorance of politics to them. He practiced media censorship, withholding subsides and arresting the staff of publications that criticized him. During the Mukden Incident, Han read a local newspaper report on Sun Dianying's retreat from Chifeng: considering this to be a leak of military secrets, he accused the papers of treason and collaboration with Japan, and ordered a mass arrest of their staff. Only the intervention of Zhang Shaotang convinced Han to let them go. In another incident, he took over control of the Shandong Republican Daily (山東民國日報), effectively transforming the originally pro-Nanjing paper into his personal mouthpiece.

Han's controls on media would later become more restrictive, instituting required licenses for newspapers and infiltrating media organizations with paid spies that reported to him. Due to these restrictions, news media frequently took on a sensationalist quality, reporting on salacious stories and scandalous events rather than political matters. Although he patronized it, Han also enforced these same restrictions on film and theater.

Freedom of association was banned under Han, with all demonstrations needing advance permission from the government. Military police were deployed to supervise the meetings of registered groups.

==== Anti-drug campaigns ====
The writer Frank Dorn credits Han with "wiping out traffic in narcotics in campaigns of suppression". Before Han had taken power in 1930, Shandong had been a major center for the drug trade and its abuse: it boasted around three thousand traffickers and 800,000 addicts (out of a population of fifty million), costing the province 300 million yuan annually, assuming that each person spent one yuan daily on drugs. One of Han's main priorities as governor was curbing this industry.

Han issued several measures prohibiting drug offenses: those caught smoking opium were to be sent to rehabilitation centers, while those caught selling opium were to be fined. Repeat offenders were executed. Traffickers of hard drugs were also executed. Han's biography maintains that while his restrictive campaigns failed to target the root causes of drug abuse, they had indeed majorly reduced the drug trade across Shandong, as open selling of drugs had become extremely rare.

==== Religion ====
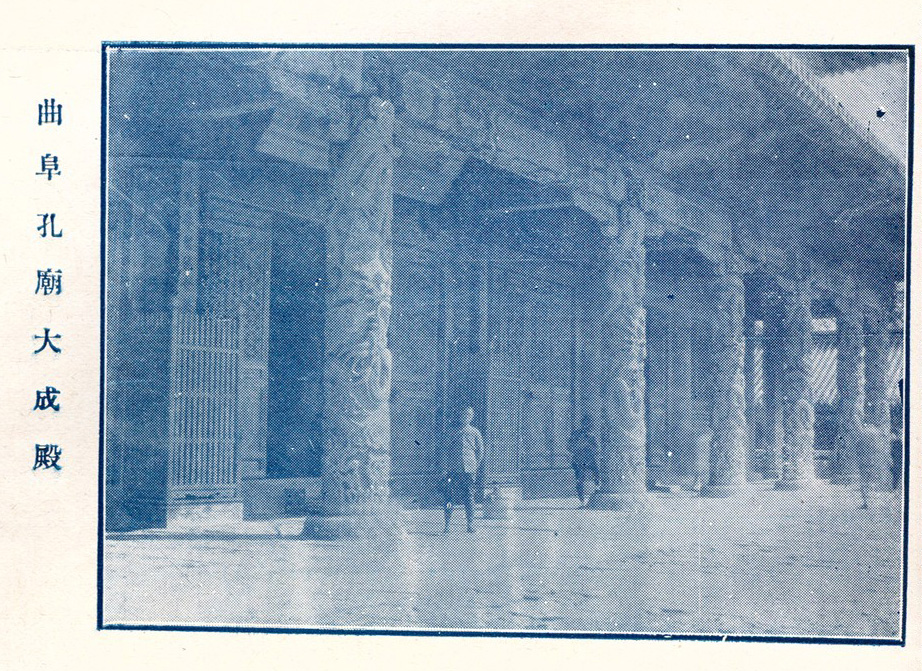
Han restored the Temple of Confucius (1935 image) in Qufu.

Han was an active and consistent patron of Confucianism. In 1931, when Han was visiting Qufu on a bandit suppression campaign, he took note of the dilapidated state of the Temple of Confucius and, for many years, called on the central government to advocate funds for its restoration. In a 1934 telegram to Wang Jingwei, Han stated that the refurbishment of the temple would be the only way to restore the people's commitment to traditional rites and values. Han's lobbying would pay off in October of that year when Nanjing committed to the reconstruction of the temple as well as other Confucian sites in the area. Han would be appointed vice chairman of the temple restoration committee, with Dai Jitao as chairman.

Apart from this episode, Han also ensured that the Confucian classics were taught in his education system, established Confucian organizations in Shandong, and, through his representative He Siyuan, supported the descendants of the Four Sages, particularly Kung Te-cheng.

==== Education ====
Han had made the popularization of education one of the priorities of his rule, and throughout the 1930s, the education budget steadily increased from two million yuan before 1932 to three million after 1933. Teachers' salaries were also described as "relatively high" by Chinese standards. Han promoted compulsory education by building several permanent schools and around two thousand temporary schools throughout the province; by 1933, primary enrollment had more than doubled from 1929. (Note: The 1929 figure was 556,000; the 1933 figure was 1,149,000.)

Han was generally supportive of He Siyuan's policies as minister of education, although he did politically interfere and conduct raids on suspected communists who were teaching in schools. He Siyuan, in this regard, was an advocate of "survival education" (求生教育), arguing that the traditional system of education had become "detached from life" and called for teaching practical skills. Han also reportedly had interest in Tao Xingzhi's educational methods, urging rural teachers to emulate them. Finally, Han praised and commemorated Wu Xun's commitment to promoting education, but preparations for the centenary of his birth in September 1937 were disrupted by war.

Han's eventual goal was universal education, although this was not fulfilled by the end of his rule.

=== Economic policies ===
According to historian Lü Weijun, Han Fuju advocated for developmentalism, admiring the United States, the Soviet Union, Germany, Italy, and Japan for their rapid economic modernization and claiming that China, in its current backwards state, must learn from them or "perish". However, Han had also criticized the wealth inequality present in Depression-era America, arguing for the restriction of capital under the broader framework of national and provincial development.

==== Provincial development ====
By commercial operations, principally in cotton, tobacco, and real estate, Han grew rich and gave generously to schools, hospitals, and civic improvements.

==== Fiscal policy ====
Han's fiscal strategies were geared towards taking and retaining control of the province's revenues in order to maintain autonomous from Nanjing's influence and fund his projects. Han's main revenues came from central government and provincial taxes; despite ostensibly belonging to Nanjing, Han often retained the money from the central government taxes.

The central government taxes included the unified central tax (levied after abolishment of the likin), commodity taxes, mining taxes, stamp and import duties, and the salt tax. The Shandong government collected around one million yuan from the stamp tax alone. By late 1936, the central government had introduced income tax, which Han unsuccessfully attempted to resist. Although several miscellaneous taxes were abolished, and the situation was an improvement from Zhang Zongchang's administration, the tax burden nonetheless remained high.

Han's provincial taxes included the land tax, sales tax, business tax, brokerage tax, more commodity taxes, livestock and house taxes, and many other minor revenue sources. Of these, Han's main source of revenue was the land tax, the income of which was recorded at over 14 million yuan in 1934. Revenue from provincial taxes gradually increased over the course of Han's rule in Shandong.

Another priority of Han was to repay the debts incurred by previous governments, which had borrowed heavily from international companies and local banks. Debt repayment was included in the provincial expenditures, at least from the years 1931–33. Overall revenue and expenditures were generally stable and in line with each other, fluctuating around 24 million yuan.

==== Rural reconstruction ====
Han had promoted rural reconstruction during his time in Henan, and he continued seeking advice from the politician and philosopher Liang Shuming on how to best manage Shandong's countryside. According to historian Lü Weijun, Han recognized that he lacked knowledge on rural reform, and largely delegated the task to Liang, whom he respected and treated as a top political ally. Liang and Han also shared the Confucian worldview that Chinese society was based around ethical relationships and professional occupations, thus rendering Marxism and class struggle unnecessary.

In May 1931, Han and Liang established the Rural Reconstruction Research Institute dedicated to the study and implementation of Liang's theories in Zouping. He also established a network of rural schools throughout the province that aimed to combine governance and education, teaching self-government, self-defense, agriculture, and morals. Aside from Zuoping, Heze also became one of the main centers of the movement; "rural construction experimentation zones" spread to over seventy counties by 1937, and the administration of two counties was even turned over to the institute.

As part of the movement and Liang's ideas of economic development, several cooperatives were set up to handle forestry, industry, and provide credit. A major cooperative encouraged the growth and processing of American cotton, which was mainly sold to Japanese trading companies. Others worked to promote education of new agricultural techniques, or facilitate the production of various handicrafts. The cooperatives have been appraised as an early attempt to improve conditions in Shandong's countryside, but limited in implementation and generally ineffective at solving rural problems. Rural reconstruction came to a halt after the outbreak of war with Japan.

=== Domestic and foreign relations ===
==== Relations with Nanjing ====
In May 1931, controversy over Chiang Kai-shek's arrest of Hu Hanmin led to the Guangdong and Guangxi cliques of Chen Jitang and Li Zongren establishing a rival Nationalist government in Guangzhou. In July 1931, Shi Yousan, Han's longtime friend, staged a rebellion in Hebei on the side of the Guangzhou government, but was quickly defeated by a combined Nationalist force. During this rebellion, Han sided with the central government and urged Shi to back down and end his rebellion; Shi subsequently told his advisors to stop receiving messages from Han Fuju. Nevertheless, after Shi's defeat, he fled to Shandong, and the remnants of his army (around 3,000 men) were surrounded and absorbed by Han at Dezhou. Shi would eventually leave to Tianjin in 1933—again against Han's advice—to work with the Japanese.

In October 1931 and January 1932, Han organized takeovers of the central government's taxation offices in Shandong due to disputes over military pay. Chiang had promised to pay 600,000 yuan monthly to Han's army, but no such payment had been forthcoming; thus, Han initiated confrontation with the central government. This episode ended with Han returning the offices to the government and Nanjing agreeing to pay its arrears. Han subsequently resisted several attempts by the Finance Ministry under H. H. Kung to crack down on smuggling and take control of the provincial customs revenues.

Han had poor relations with Kuomintang officials, especially those of the CC Clique, whom he viewed as "children of the party." According to Chinese sources, he went as far as to arrest and imprison Liu Lianyi (刘涟漪), a leading KMT official in Shandong, by framing a murder on Liu. He also ordered the assassination of Zhang Weicun, another high-ranking KMT official, in 1935 because he was spying on behalf of the CC Clique. In 1933, Han began withholding funds from county-level KMT branches, forcing the closure and inactivity of many.

To resist Nanjing's authority, Han cultivated relations with other independent warlords. During the Liangguang Incident, Han and Song Zheyuan jointly called for peace between Chen Jitang, Li Zongren, and the central government, infuriating Chiang. Han reiterated these statements during the Xi'an Incident in December 1936, when he openly praised the actions of Zhang Xueliang and Yang Hucheng in kidnapping Chiang Kai-shek and forcing him into forming the Second United Front. Han even mobilized troops in support of Zhang and Yang against a potential assault on Xi'an by general He Yingqin, but was successfully urged by Song Zheyuan, chairman of the Hebei–Chahar Political Council, to retract his statements and support a political solution to the crisis.

==== Relations with Japan ====
According to his biography, Han's Japan policy was to work with Tokyo in order to maintain autonomy from Nanjing, while avoiding sacrificing his own independence in the process. His initial stance was one of cooperation; on taking power, Han ordered anti-Japanese groups in Shandong to be dissolved. During this early period, his main interlocutor was Major Tadashi Hanaya, who had been sent by the Kwantung Army as the Japanese military attaché in Jinan. Hanaya had been tasked by Kenji Doihara to sway the northern warlords to the Japanese side, including Han and Song Zhenyuan.

Japan had deep economic interests within Shandong, most notably along the Qingdao–Jinan Railway, where many Japanese shops were established. Japanese banks dominated finance, and eighteen Japanese pawnshops were built in Jinan following the bankruptcy of the Chinese ones. Eight out of nine cotton mills in Qingdao were Japanese-owned, and 40% of coal in Shandong came from mines that were joint Sino-Japanese ventures. Merchants and smugglers sold Japanese products across the province, including narcotics; the Japanese smuggling reportedly led to losses of up to 1 million yuan monthly in Jinan alone.

To appeal to patriotic sentiment, Han occasionally undertook measures targeting such interests, especially in the wake of aggressive acts like the Mukden and January 28 incidents. These consisted of minor crackdowns on smugglers and promotion of Chinese goods, as well as issuing circular telegrams containing patriotic statements. The Japanese did not lodge complaints with Han for these actions.

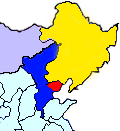
Shandong was involved in Japan's attempts to control northern China. This was achieved in Manchukuo (yellow), Hebei–Chahar (dark blue), and East Hebei (red).

In the mid-1930s, during the period of the North China Incident, he was the target of Japanese attempts to get him to incorporate his province of Shandong into one of the northern Chinese puppet states that they were attempting to construct. Such an event had occurred in Hebei and Chahar with the 1935 He–Umezu Agreement between Japan and China that expunged KMT influence from the provinces; a buffer state was subsequently established under Song Zheyuan. In November of that year, generals Hayao Tada and Iwane Matsui went to Jinan to discuss the autonomy of North China with Han. Throughout 1936, the Japanese continued pressing the issue, which included Kenji Doihara himself attempting to sway Han in March. The Japanese also invited Han to send a delegation to Manchukuo to observe conditions there, and continually attempted to stoke tensions between Han and Chiang's government. Han remained aloof of these schemes and maintained his independence; on one occasion, he even ordered mortar to be set up outside the Japanese consulate as a show of force before a particularly tense meeting between the two sides.

In early 1937, major Hanaya reportedly offered Han to become head of an autonomous government in northern China consisting of five provinces: Shandong, Hebei, Chahar, Suiyuan, and Shanxi. It would have also consisted of the three cities of Beiping, Tianjin, and Qingdao. However, Han once again rebuffed the Japanese overture, greatly enraging Hanaya. By then, relations had begun to deteriorate; Han was openly training militias and was cracking down harder on Japanese smuggling. Despite protests from the Japanese consulate, Han had started to include anti-Japanese content within the educational curriculum.

=== Popular perception ===
Han has acquired a popular perception as that of a "country bumpkin", seemingly ignorant of many things. A famous joke attributed to him by the China News Service (although one that has also been attributed to Zhang Zongchang), concerns Han watching a basketball game; puzzled by several players fighting over a single ball, Han ordered that each player be given a ball. As Han was a noted basketball fan, the veracity of such a story is in question.

Han's many arbitrary and oftentimes cruel judiciary rulings have been the subject of several apocryphal and perhaps defamatory anecdotes. In one story, denied by contemporary sources, a young messenger mistakenly stood on the right side of the courtroom and was led to the execution ground; when he attempted to appeal by saying he was a messenger, Han ordered the execution to go ahead, apparently thinking he was delivering messages to bandits. In another, Han intervened in a violent blood feud between the Tang and Wang families, executing all eleven members of the Tang family because they had committed their crimes in 1930 when Han was governor, while sparing the Wang family because they had done theirs in 1925. The most famous of these stories concerns an incident wherein Han ordered a chicken thief be executed and a cow thief be released on the grounds that chickens make noise when being stolen and cows do not, meaning a chicken thief would necessarily be bolder and thus more dangerous than a cow thief.

== Downfall ==
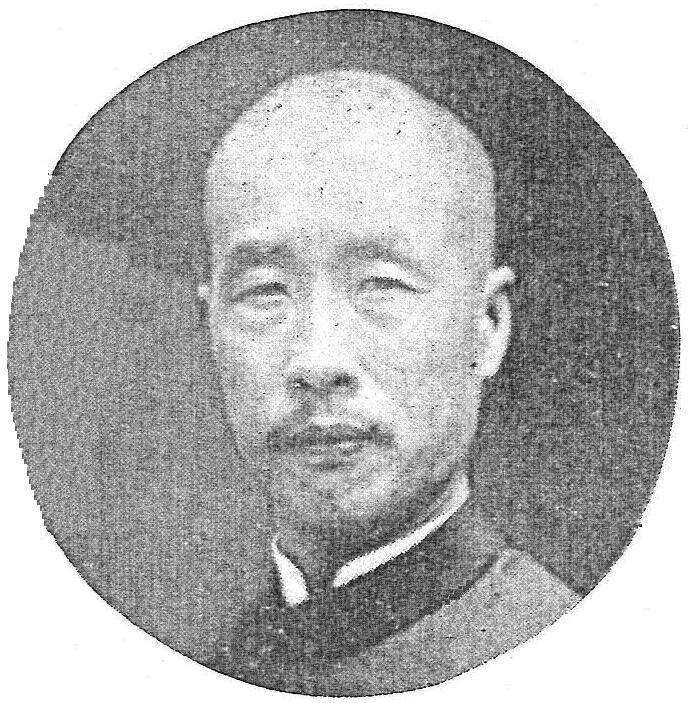
Image of Han Fuju, published in 1938

After the onset of the Second Sino-Japanese War, he commanded the 3rd Army Group and in 1937 was made Deputy Commander in Chief of the 5th War Area defending the lower Yellow River valley.

Han was suspected of having conducted secret negotiations with the Japanese to spare his province and his position of power. When the Japanese crossed the Yellow River, he abandoned his base in Jinan, which endangered the fifth warzone located between northern China and the Yangzi River. Han abandoned his army on January 6 and fled to Kaifeng, where he was arrested on 11th and brought to Wuchang and was later executed by Chiang Kai-shek for disobeying orders from superior commanders and for retreating on his own accord.

Chiang did so to set an example for those not following his orders. According to one account, Han was executed in the sanctuary of the Changchun Temple (长春观), a Taoist temple at the outskirts of Wuchang (now, almost in the center of modern Wuhan) by a single pistol bullet that was fired into the back of his head by Chiang's chief of staff, General Hu Zongnan. There are only second-hand accounts of the execution.

== Career ==
- 1928-1930: Chairman of the Government of Henan Province
- 1930-1938: Governor of Shandong
- 1937: General Officer Commanding 3rd Route Army
- 1937-1938: Commander-in-Chief 3rd Army Group
- 1938: Deputy Commander-in-Chief 5th War Area
- 1938 Arrested and executed at a military conference in Hankou for failing to defend Shandong

== Personal life ==
Aside from his execution as a traitor, Han Fuju is remembered for his jokes and poetry. According to historian Diana Lary, one of his best known poems was about the Daming Lake in Jinan, though the same poem has also been attributed to Zhang Zongchang by newspapers such as the Beijing Evening News and People's Daily.

Han was a basketball enthusiast, and during his rule in Shandong, he ordered his army to organize basketball teams as part of military training. Aside from basketball, he enjoyed a variety of other sports including horseback riding, swimming, and football. Han personally played in matches and taught his son to play football.

=== Marriages and children ===
Han had one wife, two concubines, and four sons. His first marriage was arranged to Gao Yizhen, when she was 14 years old. Han's biography does not record how old he was around that time, but he was around the same age. When Han ran away from his mounting debts in 1910, Gao reportedly assented to this, and even gave him jewelry for use as an escape fund. Gao would give birth to three of Han's sons, and a daughter who died in infancy.

In 1928, when Han was stationed in Luohe, Han took on a concubine, Ji Ganqing. Ji was a singer of zhuizishu (坠子书), and Han had reportedly fallen for her at first sight, which went against Feng Yuxiang's rules forbidding concubinage. During his time in Shandong, Han favored Ji and frequently had her accompany him on official duties.

After Han's arrival in Shandong, he took on another concubine, Li Xiuqing. Li was originally a courtesan in Jinan, and Han had reportedly once again fallen for her at first sight. Li gave birth to Han's fourth son.

== Sources ==
=== References ===
Lü, Weijun (1997). 韩复榘传 [Biography of Han Fuju] (in Chinese) (2nd ed.). Jinan: Shandong People's Publishing House. ISBN 9787209020930.
