= Liutuan =

Liutuan may refer to these towns in China:

- Liutuan, Heilongjiang (六团), in Yanshou County, Heilongjiang
- Liutuan, Shandong (柳疃), in Changyi, Shandong
