= Yanshou County =

Yanshou County 延寿县
- County
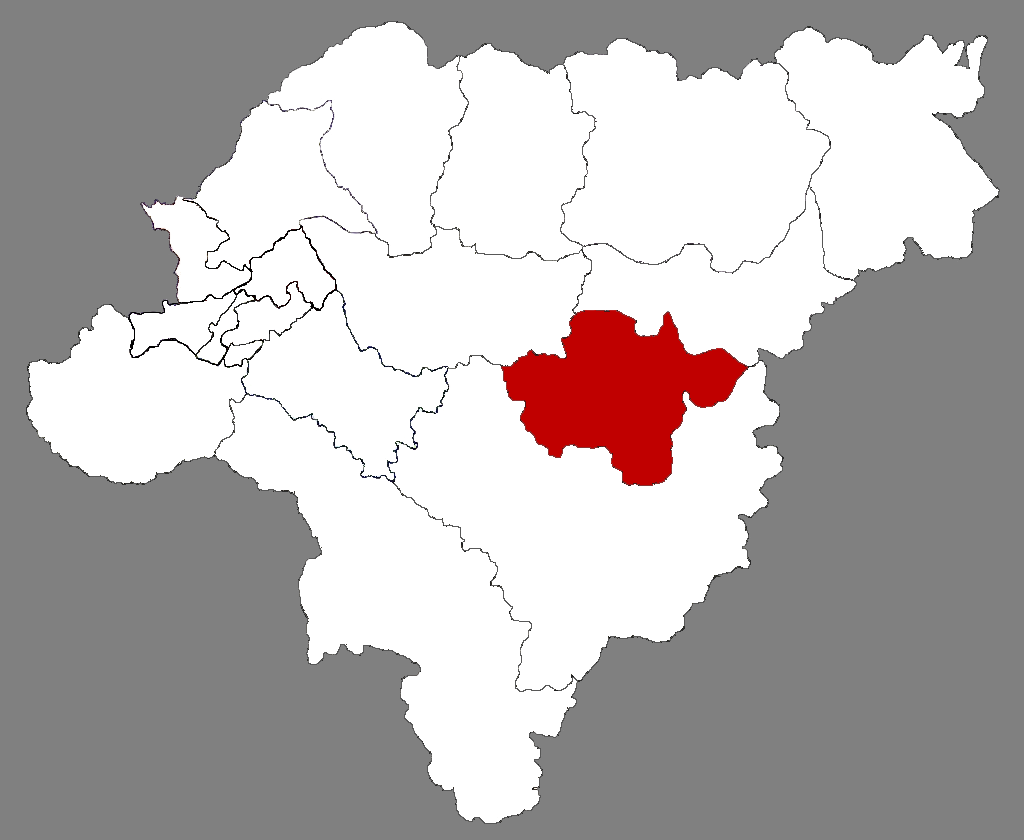
- Location of Yanshou in Harbin

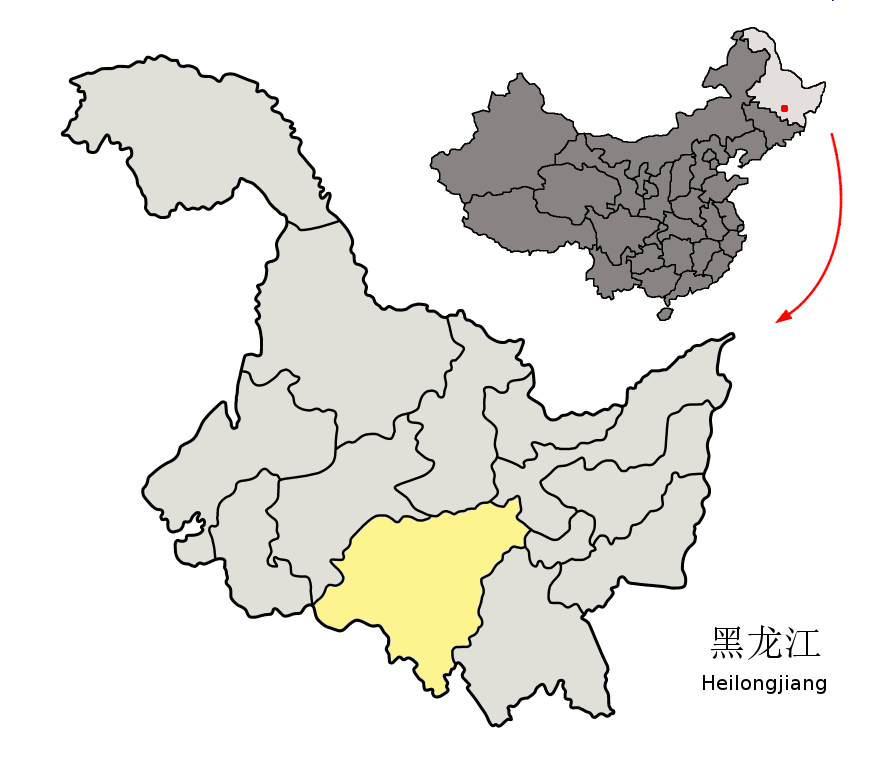
- Harbin in Heilongjiang
- Coordinates: 45°27′11″N 128°19′48″E
- Country: People's Republic of China
- Province: Heilongjiang
- Sub-provincial city: Harbin

Area
  - Total: 3,149.6 km^{2} (1,216.1 sq mi)

Population (2010)
  - Total: 242,455
  - Density: 76.980/km^{2} (199.38/sq mi)
- Time zone: UTC+8 (China Standard)
- Postal code: 1507XX

Yanshou County (simplified Chinese: 延寿县; traditional Chinese: 延壽縣; pinyin: Yánshòu Xiàn) is a county of Heilongjiang Province, Northeast China, under the administration of the prefecture-level city of Harbin, the capital of Heilongjiang. It borders Fangzheng County to the north, Shangzhi to the south, and Bin County to the northwest.

== Administrative divisions ==
Yanshou County is divided into 6 towns and 3 townships.

6 towns

- Yanshou (延寿镇), Liutuan (六团镇), Zhonghe (中和镇), Jiaxin (加信镇), Yanhe (延河镇), Yuhe (玉河镇)

3 townships

- Anshan (安山乡), Shoushan (寿山乡), Qingchuan (青川乡)

== Demographics ==
The population of the district was 250,928 in 1999.

== Climate ==
Climate data for Yanshou, elevation 167 m (548 ft), (1991–2020 normals, extremes 1981–present)
Month	Jan	Feb	Mar	Apr	May	Jun	Jul	Aug	Sep	Oct	Nov	Dec	Year
Record high °C (°F)	2.8 (37.0)	8.6 (47.5)	18.5 (65.3)	29.4 (84.9)	34.1 (93.4)	36.6 (97.9)	36.0 (96.8)	35.0 (95.0)	31.4 (88.5)	26.5 (79.7)	18.2 (64.8)	8.6 (47.5)	36.6 (97.9)
Mean daily maximum °C (°F)	−11.8 (10.8)	−6.2 (20.8)	2.5 (36.5)	13.1 (55.6)	20.5 (68.9)	25.4 (77.7)	27.6 (81.7)	26.2 (79.2)	21.4 (70.5)	12.3 (54.1)	−0.1 (31.8)	−10.1 (13.8)	10.1 (50.1)
Daily mean °C (°F)	−19.3 (−2.7)	−14.3 (6.3)	−4.1 (24.6)	6.2 (43.2)	13.9 (57.0)	19.7 (67.5)	22.4 (72.3)	20.7 (69.3)	14.2 (57.6)	5.4 (41.7)	−5.9 (21.4)	−16.3 (2.7)	3.5 (38.4)
Mean daily minimum °C (°F)	−25.8 (−14.4)	−22.0 (−7.6)	−10.6 (12.9)	−0.1 (31.8)	7.4 (45.3)	14.6 (58.3)	18.1 (64.6)	16.2 (61.2)	8.1 (46.6)	−0.2 (31.6)	−11.0 (12.2)	−22.1 (−7.8)	−2.3 (27.9)
Record low °C (°F)	−39.4 (−38.9)	−41.1 (−42.0)	−32.3 (−26.1)	−11.3 (11.7)	−5.1 (22.8)	3.4 (38.1)	10.4 (50.7)	5.5 (41.9)	−3.8 (25.2)	−20.4 (−4.7)	−29.8 (−21.6)	−37.6 (−35.7)	−41.1 (−42.0)
Average precipitation mm (inches)	3.9 (0.15)	5.1 (0.20)	13.4 (0.53)	25.5 (1.00)	65.7 (2.59)	108.6 (4.28)	143.2 (5.64)	139.4 (5.49)	59.8 (2.35)	33.5 (1.32)	15.5 (0.61)	7.7 (0.30)	621.3 (24.46)
Average precipitation days (≥ 0.1 mm)	4.9	4.4	6.3	7.7	12.8	14.2	14.7	14.3	10.3	8.2	6.8	7.3	111.9
Average snowy days	9.7	7.2	9.2	3.2	0.1	0	0	0	0	2.8	9.0	11.0	52.2
Average relative humidity (%)	75	72	68	62	65	74	82	84	79	72	73	76	74
Mean monthly sunshine hours	148.4	175.2	211.4	206.6	228.5	233.4	215.4	200.1	207.6	173.0	138.4	130.1	2,268.1
Percentage possible sunshine	52	59	57	51	50	50	46	46	56	52	49	48	51
Source: China Meteorological AdministrationAll-time May Record
