= Mining taxation =

Mining taxation refers to the taxes that apply to mining. It is often assumed that the taxating country aims towards a combination of high production and high taxes and thus the problem of mining taxation is that of achieving both.

== Strategy and taxation laws ==
Countries have tended to compete with low or favourable taxation to attract mining investment that in turn generate a taxation base. It has been noted that in the last decade of the 20th century taxation methods and levels tended to became more uniform across countries in the world. It is generally though that investment in mining activity is riskier than other types of business and this has led many countries to implement tax incentives. Some of these incentives target taxation discounts related to mineral exploration and mine development, the first one carrying a lot of uncertainty and the second being usually a very costly investment. Other areas targeted for tax discounts are machinery importation, relaxed or lack of export tariffs and tax benefits aiming to mitigate schocks from commodity price cycles. Various countries such as Ecuador, Tanzania and the Philippines apply as of 2023 a policy of taxating profit.

Historically and up to the present some states have sought increased earnings through state-owned mining companies (e.g. Codelco) rather than restricting their mining income to taxation.
