= Liutuan, Heilongjiang =

Liutuan 六团镇
- Town
- Location in Heilongjiang Liutuan (China)
- Coordinates: 45.57783°N 128.48691°E
- Country: People's Republic of China
- Province: Heilongjiang
- Prefecture-level city: Harbin
- County: Yanshou County
- Time zone: UTC+8 (China Standard)

Liutuan (Chinese: 六团; pinyin: Liùtúan) is a town under the administration of Yanshou County, Heilongjiang, China. As of 2018, it has 15 villages under its administration.
