= Liutuan, Shandong =

Liutuan 柳疃鎮
- Town
- Location in Shandong
- Coordinates: 36.945°N 119.395°E
- Country: People's Republic of China
- Province: Shandong
- Prefecture-level city: Weifang
- County-level city: Changyi

Area
  - Total: 210 km^{2} (81 sq mi)

Population (2005)
  - Total: 48,000
  - Major nationalities: Han Chinese
- Time zone: UTC
- Postal code: 261302
- Coastline: 113 kilometres (70 mi)
- Website: www.changyi.gov.cn

Liutuan (Chinese: 柳疃; pinyin: Liǔtuǎn) is a town in Changyi, Shandong, China. The town is mentioned as an example of the usage of the character 疃 (tuǎn) in the seventh edition of the Contemporary Chinese Dictionary and in the sixth edition of the Cihai Dictionary. As of 2018, it has 72 villages under its administration.
