= Nanyuan Township =

Nanyuan Area 南苑地区
- Subdistrict
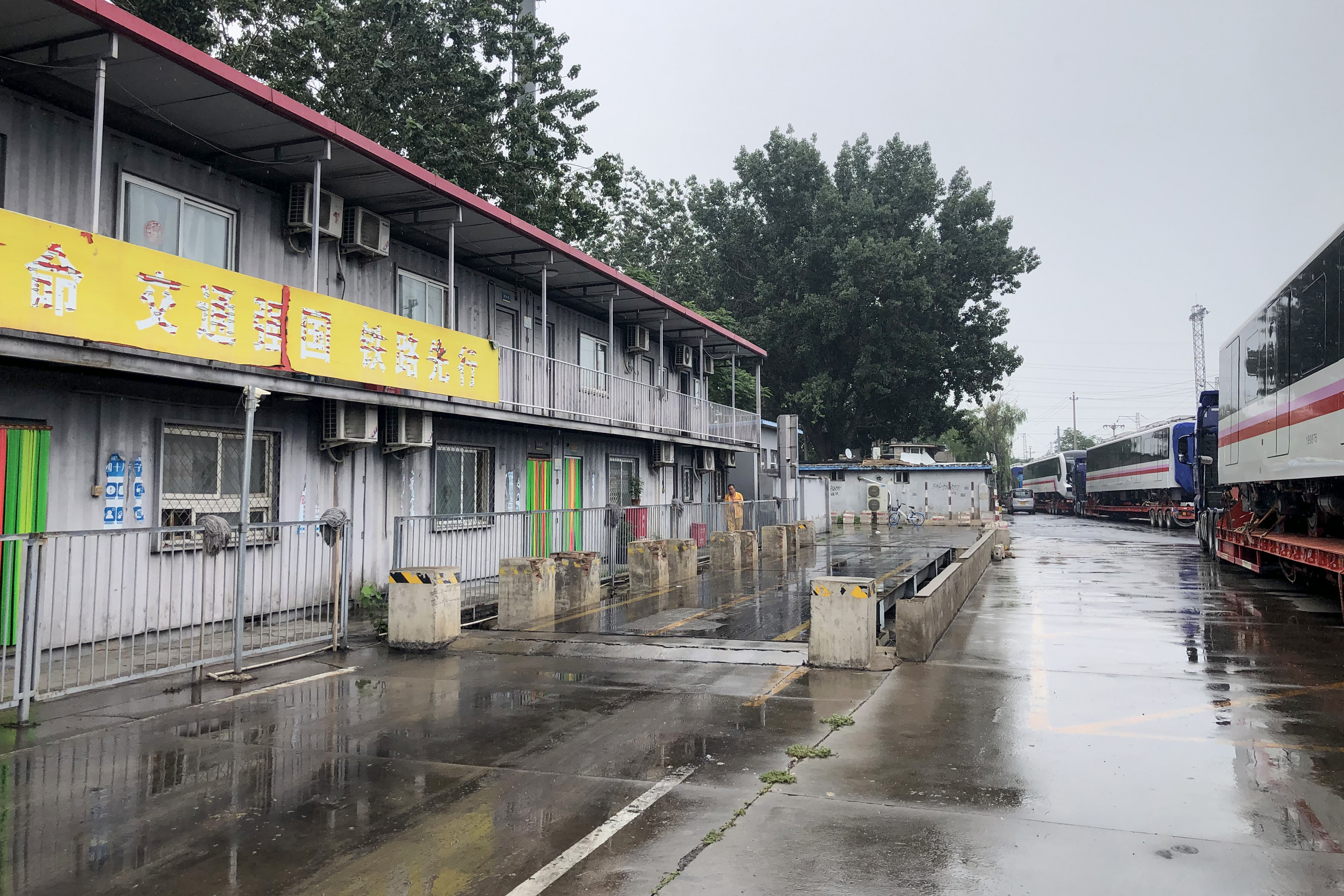
- Dahongmen Freight Yard within the area, 2021

- Location within Beijing Location within China
- Coordinates: 39°49′45″N 116°23′58″E
- Country: China
- Municipality: Beijing
- District: Fengtai
- Village-level Divisions: 7 communities 12 village

Area
  - Total: 17.61 km^{2} (6.80 sq mi)

Population (2020)
  - Total: 59,408
  - Density: 3,374/km^{2} (8,737/sq mi)
- Time zone: UTC+8 (China Standard)
- Postal code: 100075
- Area code: 010

Nanyuan Area (Chinese: 南苑地区; pinyin: Nányuàn Dìqū) was a township and area situated on the eastern side of Fengtai District, Beijing, China. It bordered Dongcheng and Xicheng Districts to the north, Chaoyang District to the east, Daxing District to the south, Huaxiang Township and Lugouqiao Subdistrict to the west. As of the 2020 Chinese census, Nanyuan Area was home to 59,408 residents.

On July 11, 2021, the government of Fengtai District announced a series of changes to its subdivisions, which included the area's dissolution. This area is currently a part of Nanyuan Subdistrict.

== History ==
Timeline of Nanyuan Township
Year	Status
1948	Part of Nanyuan District south of Dahongmen and part of the 15th District north of Dahongmen were merged into the 11th District
1952	Renamed to Nanyuan District
1958	Converted to a commune
1984	Converted into Nanyuan Rural Bureau
1987	Converted to a township
2010	Became an area while retaining township status
2021	Dissolved and incorporated into Nanyuan Subdistrict

== Administrative Division ==
In 2020, Nanyuan Subdistrict is divided into 19 subdivisions, with 7 communities and 12 villages:

Administrative Division Code	Community Names	Name Transliteration	Type
110106019001	双石一	Shuangshiyi	Community
110106019002	双石二	Shuangshi'er	Community
110106019003	福海棠华苑	Fuhaitang Huayuan	Community
110106019004	大红门锦苑一	Dahongmen Jinyuanyi	Community
110106019005	大红门锦苑二	Dahongmen Jinyuan'er	Community
110106019006	新宫	Xingong	Community
110106019007	德鑫嘉园	Dexin Jiayuan	Community
110106019200	西铁营	Xitieying	Village
110106019201	右安门	You'anmen	Village
110106019204	东罗园	Dongluoyuan	Village
110106019205	果园	Guoyuan	Village
110106019206	时村	Shicun	Village
110106019207	石榴庄	Shiliuzhuang	Village
110106019208	大红门	Dahongmen	Village
110106019209	东铁营	Dongtieying	Village
110106019210	新宫	Xingong	Village
110106019211	分中寺	Fenzhongsi	Village
110106019212	南苑	Nanyuan	Village
110106019213	槐房	Huaifang	Village
