= Income tax in China =

Form of taxation in China

The Individual Income Tax in China (commonly abbreviated IIT) is administered on a progressive tax system with tax rates from 3 percent to 45 percent. As of 2019, China taxes individuals who reside in the country for more than 183 days on worldwide earned income. The system is separate from the income tax system of Hong Kong and Macau, which are administered independently.

The taxpayers of individual income tax include both resident taxpayers and non-resident taxpayers. A resident taxpayer who has the obligation to pay taxes in full must pay individual income tax on all income derived from sources within or outside China. The non-resident taxpayer shall pay individual income tax only on the income derived or sourced from China.

Individual income tax is a kind of income tax levied by the state on the income of citizens and individuals living in the country and the income derived from the country by individuals outside the country. In some countries, individual income tax is the main tax, accounting for a large proportion of fiscal revenue, and has a great impact on the economy.

A draft amendment to the individual income tax law is submitted to the third session of the 13th National People's Congress standing committee for deliberation on June 19, 2018. It is the seventh overhaul of the tax law since it was introduced in 1980. The draft decision of the NPC standing committee on amending the individual income tax law was submitted to the fifth session of the 13th NPC standing committee for deliberation on August 27, 2018. According to the draft decision, the basic standard for deducting expenses is to be set at 60,000 yuan per year, or 5,000 yuan per month, with the new tax rate range from 3% to 45% unchanged.

On August 31, 2018, the decision to revise the individual income tax law was passed, with the minimum threshold of 5,000 yuan per month and the latest threshold and tax rate implemented from Oct 1, 2018.

== Development history ==
During the period of the Republic of China, China used to levy income tax on salaries and interest on securities deposits.

In 1950, the executive principles for the implementation of the tax administration promulgated by the state council listed the types of taxes levied on individual income, which were then called "income tax on remuneration". However, due to the low level of productivity and per capita income, China implemented a low-wage system, and although taxes were set up, they were never levied.

On September 1, 1980, the third session of the fifth National People's Congress adopted and promulgated the individual income tax law of the People's Republic of China. China's individual income tax system was thus established.

On September 10, 1980, the individual income tax law of the People's Republic of China was adopted by the third session of the fifth National People's Congress.

After 1980, in order to adapt to China's policy of invigorating itself internally and opening up to the outside world, China formulated the individual income tax law of the People's Republic of China, the provisional regulations of the People's Republic of China on income tax for urban and rural individual industrial and commercial households, and the provisional regulations of the People's Republic of China on individual income regulation tax. After the promulgation and implementation of the above three tax laws and regulations, they have played a positive role in adjusting personal income level, increasing national fiscal revenue, and promoting economic and technological cooperation and exchanges with foreign countries. However, some problems have also been exposed.

In September 1986, in response to the great changes in China's domestic personal income, the state council promulgated the "provisional regulations of the People's Republic of China on personal income regulatory tax", which stipulates the unified collection of personal income regulatory tax on the personal income of Chinese citizens.

To unified tax, fair tax burden, tax system, on October 31, 1993, the eighth session of the standing committee of the National People's Congress four conference passed the standing committee of the National People's Congress on amending ‘the individual income tax law of the People's Republic of China’ decision ", on the same day issued a new modification of the individual income tax law of the People's Republic of China "(hereinafter referred to as the tax law).

On January 28, 1994, the state council issued the regulations for the implementation of the individual income tax law of the People's Republic of China.

On January 1, 2002, individual income tax income was divided between the central and local governments in proportion.

In July 2003, the institute of fiscal science of the ministry of finance of China released a report entitled "China's resident income distribution status and fiscal and tax adjustment policies", which proposed to reform the current individual income tax system, moderately increase the threshold of individual income tax, and adopt a low tax rate policy for middle-income groups.

On October 22, 2003, the ministry of commerce of the People's Republic of China proposed to abolish the collection of interest tax and increase the exemption amount of individual income tax.

On October 27, 2005, the 18th session of the standing committee of the 10th National People's Congress, the third amendment, voted through the NPC standing committee on the amendment of the individual income tax law decision, the exemption amount of 1600 yuan from January 1, 2006.

On December 29, 2007, the 31st session of the standing committee of the 10th National People's Congress, as amended in the fifth session, raised the exemption amount of individual income tax from 1600 yuan to 2000 yuan from March 1, 2008.

At the 21st meeting of the standing committee of the 11th National People's Congress on June 30, 2011, the sixth amendment was made. Subsequently, the state council issued the order No. 600, and the revised regulations for the implementation of the individual income tax law of the People's Republic of China came into effect on September 1, 2011.

The fifth session of the standing committee of the 13th National People's Congress, which was amended for the seventh time, was held on Aug 31, 2018. The revision opens up the parallel mode of the comprehensive and classified taxation of individual income tax in China, which combines the income from wages and salaries, remuneration for labor services, remuneration for manuscripts and royalties into the comprehensive income for comprehensive declaration, and the deduction amount of individual income tax expense is adjusted to 5000 yuan. Subsequently, on December 22, 2018, the interim measures for special additional deduction of individual income tax issued by the state council [2018] No. 41 and the revised decree of the state council No. 707 were issued, together with the regulations for the implementation of the individual income tax law of the People's Republic of China.

In June 2018, China's National People's Congress (NPC), adopted an amendment to reform the ITT. The tax authorities had published draft implementing rules and amending measures for comment. Dwyer told China Briefing: "The changes are profound and will have an impact on expatriates as well as Chinese nationals. Mr. Dwyer also warned that expatriates and their employers should be vigilant: "The authorities are likely to strengthen their oversight of TII - especially for expatriate executives or companies employing large numbers of expatriates".

On 31 August 2018, the NPC passed the Draft Amendment to the People's Republic of China (PRC) IIT Law, and it takes its effects on 1 January 2019.

== Object of taxation ==
As of at least 2024, revenues from personal income tax are 6.5% of China's total tax revenues. The Chinese government's tax revenues are primarily from indirect taxes such as the value added tax.

=== Legal object ===
The taxpayers of individual income tax in China are persons who have obtained income by residing in China and individuals who have obtained income from China without residing in China, including Chinese citizens, foreign nationals who have obtained income in China and compatriots from Hong Kong, Macau and Taiwan.

=== Resident taxpayers ===
As per the amendment of IT Act, effective from January 2019, individuals who have domicile in China, or who have no domicile but have stayed for at least 183 days in a single tax year in China are classified as resident taxpayers and have unlimited duty of tax payment, that is, they pay individual income tax on their income obtained within and outside China.

=== Non-resident taxpayers ===
Individuals who have no domicile and do not live in China, or who have no domicile but have resided in China for less than 183 days in a tax year, are non-resident individuals. Income obtained by non-resident individuals within the territory of China is subject to individual income tax in accordance with Personal Income Tax Law.

== Tax content ==
- 1.Income from wages and salaries
- 2.Income from remuneration for personal services
- 3.Income from author's remuneration
- 4.Income from royalties
- 5.Business income
- 6.Interest Dividend and Bonus Income
- 7.Income from lease of property
- 8.Income from transfer of property
- 9.Incidental income
- 10.Other Income

Income obtained by residents individuals from items 1 to 4 of the preceding paragraph are referred as comprehensive income. For the income obtained by non-resident individuals from items 1 to 4 of the preceding paragraph, the individual income tax shall be calculated monthly or item by item.[6]

== Tax rates ==
=== Applicable tax rate ===
Individual income tax provides three different tax rates according to different tax items:

1. Comprehensive income (income from wages and salaries, income from remuneration for personal services, income from author's remuneration, and income from royalties) shall be subject to a seven-level progressive tax rate, and shall be taxed on the basis of monthly taxable income. The tax rate is divided into seven levels according to the amount of taxable income of an individual's monthly salary and salary, with the highest level at 45% and the lowest level at 3%.
2. Income from business operations shall be subject to a progressive tax rate of 5 levels. It is applicable to divide the income from production and operation of individual industrial and commercial households, which is calculated on an annual basis and prepaid on a monthly basis, and the annual taxable income of enterprises and institutions contracted or leased for operation into five classes, with the lowest class being 5% and the highest class being 35%.
3. Individual income tax on income from interest, dividends and bonuses, income from lease of property, income from transfer of property, contingent income and other income shall be levied on a piecemeal basis, at a proportional tax rate of 20%.

=== Collection management ===
The collection method of Chinese individual income tax executes source withholding and self-declaration, pay attention to source withholding.

The collection method of individual income tax can be divided into monthly tax and annual tax. For income from production and business operations of individual industrial and commercial households, income from contracted or leased operations of enterprises and institutions, income from wages and salaries of specific trades and income derived from sources outside the People's Republic of China, the tax payable shall be levied on an annual basis; for other income, the tax payable shall be levied on a monthly basis.

Taxable income (monthly)			
from [RMB]	to [RMB]	tax rate	Quick deduction
1	2,999	3%	0
3,000	11,999	10%	210
12,000	24,999	20%	1,410
25,000	34,999	25%	2,660
35,000	54,999	30%	4,410
55,000	79,999	35%	7,160
80,000	over	45%	15,160

Effective October 1, 2018

- Tax exemption: 5000 RMB for both residents and non-residents.

Tax exemption can be applied on following types of personal income 1.Prizes in science, education, technology, culture, health, sports, environmental protection, etc. awarded by provincial people's governments, ministries and commissions of the State Council, units above the Chinese People's Liberation Army, as well as foreign organizations and international organizations 2.Interest on national debt and financial bonds issued by the state 3.Subsidies and allowances issued in accordance with the unified regulations of the state 4.Welfare, pension, and relief 5.Insurance claims 6.Soldier's transfer fee, demobilization fee, retirement allowance 7.Settlement allowances, retirement allowances, basic pensions issued to cadres and employees in accordance with the unified regulations of the state 8.Income of diplomatic representatives, consular officers and other personnel of foreign embassies, consulates in China that should be exempted from tax in accordance with relevant laws 9.Tax-exempt income stipulated in international conventions and agreements signed by the Chinese government 10.Other tax-exempt income stipulated by the State Council

- Common deductions: most wage earners may be deduct state-run pensions, medical insurance, and unemployment insurance, all three of which are regularly withheld from pay; some wage earners may also deduct a housing allowance
- Taxable income = income - tax exemption
- Monthly tax formula: (taxable income * tax rate) - quick deduction = tax
- Example: ((10000 - 5000) * 10%) - 210 = 290 RMB in taxes

Note that both, tax rate and quick deduction, are based on the 'income' AFTER the 'tax exemption': the 'taxable income'.

== Residence ==
As of January 1, 2019, individuals not domiciled in China are taxed on worldwide income should they be present in mainland China for more than 183 days for the tax year. Those who reside in mainland China for less than 183 days are taxed on China-sourced income only. The Chinese concept of "domicile" is based on "habitual residence" which is deemed uninterrupted if the tax resident has to return after a period of absence (e.g. in the case of embassy workers, overseas students or tourists).

== Tax deductions ==
Beginning January 1, 2019, the taxpayer may claim deductions for the education of dependent children, continuing education, major medical expenses, mortgage interest or rental expenses, as well as expenses for taking care of ageing parents. 2019 is the first year these deductions were put into operation, and thus is considered a "trial" stage for the program and may be rescinded on notice.

- Children's Education: 12,000 RMB per year per child (1,000 RMB per month per child). Both parents can deduct 50% or one parent can deduct 100%. Includes pre-school education and academic education.
- Continuing Education: Whilst receiving continuing education, 4,800 RMB per year (400 RMB per month during the academic education period). For the year receiving the relevant professional certificate, 3,600 RMB per year.
- Major Medical Expenses: Severe Diseases Medical expense is the part exceeding 15,000 RMB of the self-paid part of the Social Health Insurance (includes diseases not covered in the Medical Insurance Catalogue). Capped at 60,000 RMB per year. (Deducted by the taxpayers themselves during the individual income tax annual return)
- Mortgage Interest: If the taxpayer or their spouse purchase the first house using loans from commercial banks or housing fund, whilst repaying the loans, the loans' interests are deducted up to 12,000 RMB per year (1,000 RMB per month)
- Rent: If the taxpayer and its spouse do not own a house in its working city, the house rent can be deducted in the following manners: In the major cities, 14,400 RMB per year (1,200 RMB per month). In other cities whose population is over one million, 12,000 RMB per year (1,000 RMB per month). In other cities whose population is one million, 9,600 RMB per year (800 RMB per month). If a couple share the same working city, only one of the two is entitled to the deduction. If the couple works in different cities, both are entitled to the deduction.
- Caring for the elderly 24,000 RMB per year for expenses supporting parents over 60 years old or other legal dependents. The deduction is shared amongst the children and an only child would receive the entire deduction.

Amongst these six kinds of deductions, severe diseases are deducted by the taxpayers themselves when declaring individual annual tax settlement. The other five could be applied for monthly deduction by the withholding person.

With the large amount of deductions allowed as outlined above, plus the general universal deduction, over 80% of the general population in effect are not paying personal income tax. The national government is primarily financed by consumption taxes based on sales at the retail and wholesale levels, property taxes levied at the time of the owner's passing.

According to the 2023 "State Council Notice on Raising the Standards for Personal Income Tax Special Additional Deductions," the following will be implemented starting from January 1, 2023:

1. The special additional deduction standards for the care of infants under 3 years old and children's education will be increased from 1,000 RMB per child per month to 2,000 RMB. Parents can choose to have one parent deduct 100% of the standard, or both parents can each deduct 50%.

2. The special additional deduction standard for supporting elderly parents will be increased from 2,000 RMB per month to 3,000 RMB. For an only child, the deduction is 3,000 RMB per month; for those with siblings, the 3,000 RMB deduction is shared, with no individual receiving more than 1,500 RMB.
