= Changyi, Shandong =

Changyi 昌邑市 Changi
- County-level city
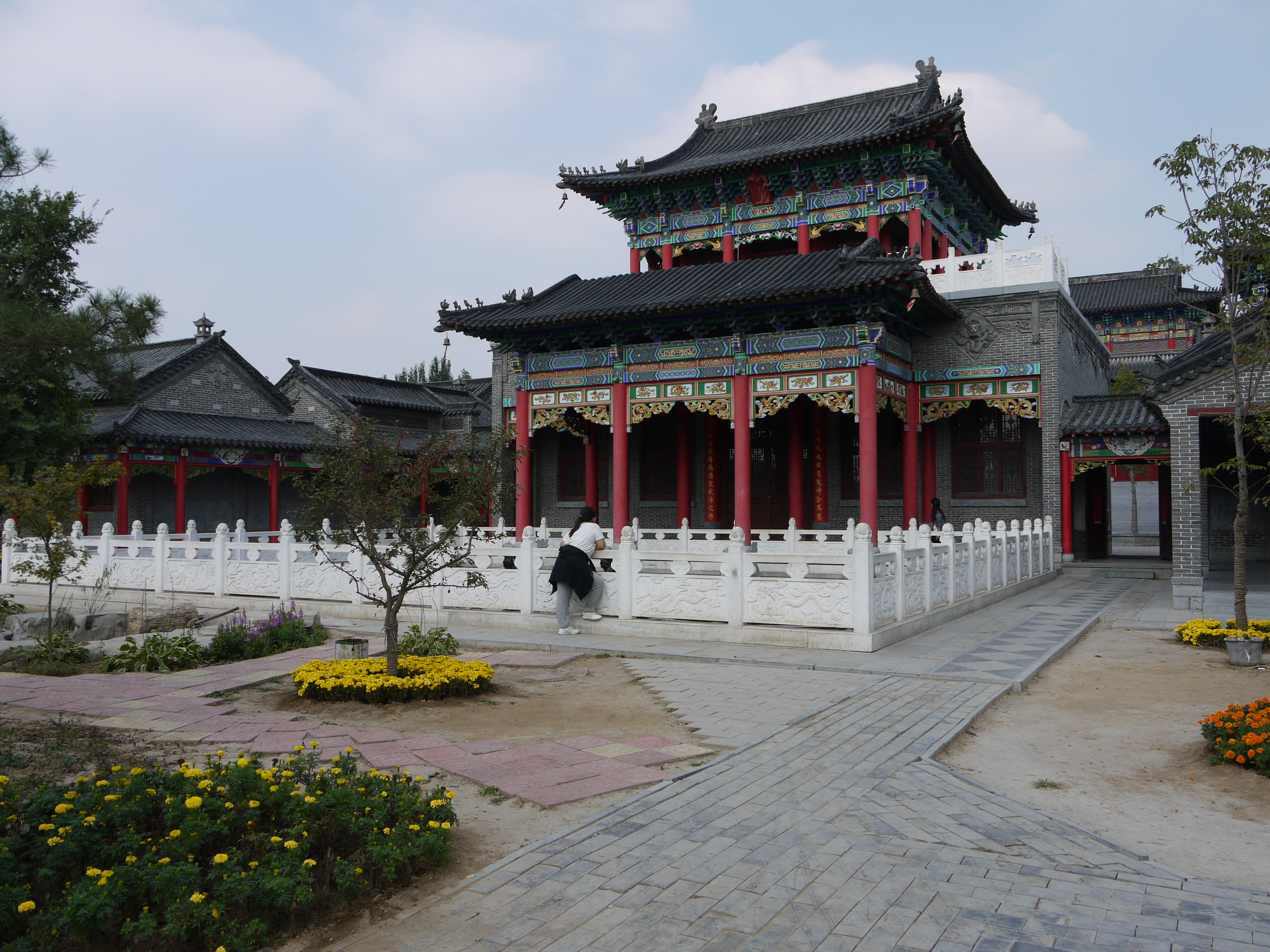
- Green Expo Garden

- Location in Shandong
- Coordinates: 36°52′N 119°24′E
- Country: People's Republic of China
- Province: Shandong
- Prefecture-level city: Weifang

Government
  - Party Secretary: Ma Yueqi
  - Mayor: Lyu Shanshan

Area
  - Total: 1,578.7 km^{2} (609.5 sq mi)

Population (2018)
  - Total: 618,400
  - Major nationalities: Han Chinese
- Time zone: UTC
- Postal code: 261300
- Coastline: 113 kilometres (70 mi)
- Website: www.changyi.gov.cn

Changyi (Chinese: 昌邑; pinyin: Chāngyì) is a county-level city of Weifang, Shandong province, People's Republic of China. The city is 1627.5 square kilometers in area, with a household population of 581,000 as of 2010. The city is under the administration of the Changyi Municipal People's Government, with 3 neighborhoods, 6 towns, 691 administrative villages, and 1 special economic development zone. Changyi has a long history that extends back to the Spring and Autumn period.

== Etymology and name ==
Changyi, from the Chinese characters 昌 for prosperous and 邑 for city, means literally the "Prosperous City". The site of ancient Ziyi (鄑邑; Zīyì) is located in Changyi. Changyi was called Duchang (都昌), as it was named Duchang County by the Qin dynasty (221–206 BC). The area was renamed "Changyi" during the Northern Song dynasty in 962 AD, and has retained its name since then.

== History ==
=== Early history ===
Changyi is over 2200 years old. In the Spring and Autumn and Warring States periods, the city served as the manor of Yanzi (晏子) and Sun Bin (孙膑).

=== People's Republic ===
In 1988, Changyi was designated a "coastal open city" by the Central Government of China, and in 1994 it was established as a county-level city to replace the old Changyi County.

== Geography ==
Changyi is located in the northwest corner of the Shandong Peninsula and in the southern Bohai's Laizhou Bay area, with geographical coordinates of latitude 36 ° 25'-37 ° 08 ', longitude 119 ° 13'-119 ° 37'. Situated on southern Laizhou Bay area of the Bohai Sea, it neighbors Yantai, Laizhou, Qingdao, and Pingdu to its east, and Weifang City to its west. It belongs to the "Qingdao One-hour Economic Zone" and "Weifang Half-hour Economic Zone." It has Shandong's largest reservoir, the Xiashan Reservoir (峡山水库). The city has a total area of 1,627.5 km^{2} (628.4 sq mi).

== Climate ==
Climate data for Changyi, elevation 24 m (79 ft), (1991–2020 normals, extremes 1981–present)
Month	Jan	Feb	Mar	Apr	May	Jun	Jul	Aug	Sep	Oct	Nov	Dec	Year
Record high °C (°F)	15.7 (60.3)	22.5 (72.5)	30.2 (86.4)	35.1 (95.2)	38.6 (101.5)	41.3 (106.3)	41.5 (106.7)	36.7 (98.1)	38.0 (100.4)	32.3 (90.1)	26.2 (79.2)	19.6 (67.3)	41.5 (106.7)
Mean daily maximum °C (°F)	3.2 (37.8)	6.7 (44.1)	13.3 (55.9)	20.2 (68.4)	26.0 (78.8)	30.0 (86.0)	31.3 (88.3)	30.2 (86.4)	26.8 (80.2)	20.7 (69.3)	12.6 (54.7)	5.3 (41.5)	18.9 (66.0)
Daily mean °C (°F)	−1.9 (28.6)	1.0 (33.8)	6.7 (44.1)	13.5 (56.3)	19.6 (67.3)	23.9 (75.0)	26.5 (79.7)	25.7 (78.3)	21.4 (70.5)	14.8 (58.6)	7.2 (45.0)	0.3 (32.5)	13.2 (55.8)
Mean daily minimum °C (°F)	−5.6 (21.9)	−3.2 (26.2)	1.7 (35.1)	8.0 (46.4)	14.1 (57.4)	18.8 (65.8)	22.6 (72.7)	22.1 (71.8)	17.0 (62.6)	10.2 (50.4)	2.9 (37.2)	−3.5 (25.7)	8.8 (47.8)
Record low °C (°F)	−19.0 (−2.2)	−14.9 (5.2)	−9.4 (15.1)	−3.8 (25.2)	0.9 (33.6)	8.9 (48.0)	13.4 (56.1)	12.2 (54.0)	5.3 (41.5)	−2.6 (27.3)	−11.1 (12.0)	−17.6 (0.3)	−19.0 (−2.2)
Average precipitation mm (inches)	7.0 (0.28)	13.0 (0.51)	12.1 (0.48)	28.7 (1.13)	51.1 (2.01)	69.9 (2.75)	141.9 (5.59)	135.4 (5.33)	56.4 (2.22)	25.2 (0.99)	26.6 (1.05)	10.0 (0.39)	577.3 (22.73)
Average precipitation days (≥ 0.1 mm)	2.7	3.4	3.1	5.4	6.6	7.9	11.6	10.9	6.5	5.2	4.6	3.7	71.6
Average snowy days	4.0	3.7	1.4	0.1	0	0	0	0	0	0	1.0	3.0	13.2
Average relative humidity (%)	65	62	56	56	61	67	77	81	74	68	67	65	67
Mean monthly sunshine hours	145.5	149.8	200.8	225.0	246.4	210.6	187.2	192.7	193.7	185.7	156.1	147.2	2,240.7
Percentage possible sunshine	47	49	54	57	56	48	42	46	53	54	51	49	51
Source: China Meteorological Administration all-time extreme temperature

== Administrative divisions ==
As of 2012, this city is divided to 3 subdistricts and 6 towns.

Subdistricts

- Kuiju Subdistrict (奎聚街道)
- Duchang Subdistrict (都昌街道)
- Weizi Subdistrict (围子街道)

Towns

- Liutuan (柳疃镇)
- Longchi (龙池镇)
- Buzhuang (卜庄镇)
- Yinma (饮马镇)
- Beimeng (北孟镇)
- Xiaying (下营镇)

== Economy ==
The economy of Changyi is more industrially based, and has formed a competitive market marked by new products, new technologies, and new projects, such as the petrochemical industry, salt and salt chemical industry, machinery manufacturing, textiles, food processing, aquaculture, and green seedlings among others. Changyi's Petrochemical industry has an annual processing capacity of 10 million tons, and a sales income of 13.7 billion yuan. Changyi's salt and salt chemical industry produces crude salt with an annual production capacity of four million tons, accounting for one sixth of China's sea salt production. The bromine production capacity of Changyi by the Shandong JinDian Chemical Company is 40,000 tons a year, accounting for a quarter of China's production of bromine. Machinery manufacturing includes textile machinery, plastic machinery, broaching machines, auto parts. The auto parts manufacturing, particularly by Consolidated Metco's Shandong branch, is the largest production base in China for large automotive wheels, brake drums, brake discs production. The existing textile enterprises, such as that of the Huachen group, have more than 2,500 factories with an annual spinning capacity of 1.8 million meters, weaving capacity of 3.5 billion meters, and with dyeing, printing capacity of 2.1 billion meters, and is ranked within the top 50 of the Chinese textile brands. Food processing industry has over 160 processing enterprises, whose products are sold in over 30 countries and regions in the world. Tyson Foods also has a branch in Changyi which processes chicken for Tyson's Asia market. The Tyson plant processes up to 80,000 chickens per day. The aquaculture industry currently has factory farming area of 230,000 square meters, producing over 140,000 tons of aquatic products, with the total output value of 820 million RMB. Industry of seedlings has seedlings of 1647.369 acres, seedling stock of 200 million annual turnover of 500 million RMB. Changyi has been assessed as the National seedlings market by the State Forestry Administration of the People's Republic of China, the National Advanced Unit of Tree Seed and Seedling" and has successfully organized nine National North China Green Seedlings Expos and six Chinese Garden Flowers and Information Exchanges.

=== Development of high-tech industries ===
Currently, Changyi has one national post-doctoral research institution, 29 of the Provincial and Weifang municipal engineering and technical centers, produces two top national brand-name products, four famous national trademarks, twelve Shandong name-brands, and 26 famous Shandong trademarks. The city has been nationally named an advanced city for science and technology for six consecutive years. Changyi is fast in developing strategic new enterprises marked by new energy sources, new materials, high-end equipment manufacturing, energy saving and environmental protection, and bio-pharmaceutical industry. The urban and rural household waste utilization project has applied for 13 Intellectual property in the People's Republic of China, passed the provincial assessment of science and technology achievements, and reached the international advanced level, and won major energy-saving achievement award of Shandong Province. Jinsida Project of Treatment and Recycling of Printing and Dyeing Waste Water has applied for 12 national patents, and been included in the top 10 model technology projects of sustainable development in Shandong Province, winning the 3rd place of scientific and technological progress in Shandong. Swiss electric company direct drive permanent magnet wind turbine won 11 national patents and is designated as one of the 2011 key projects of Shandong Province.

=== Coastal development ===
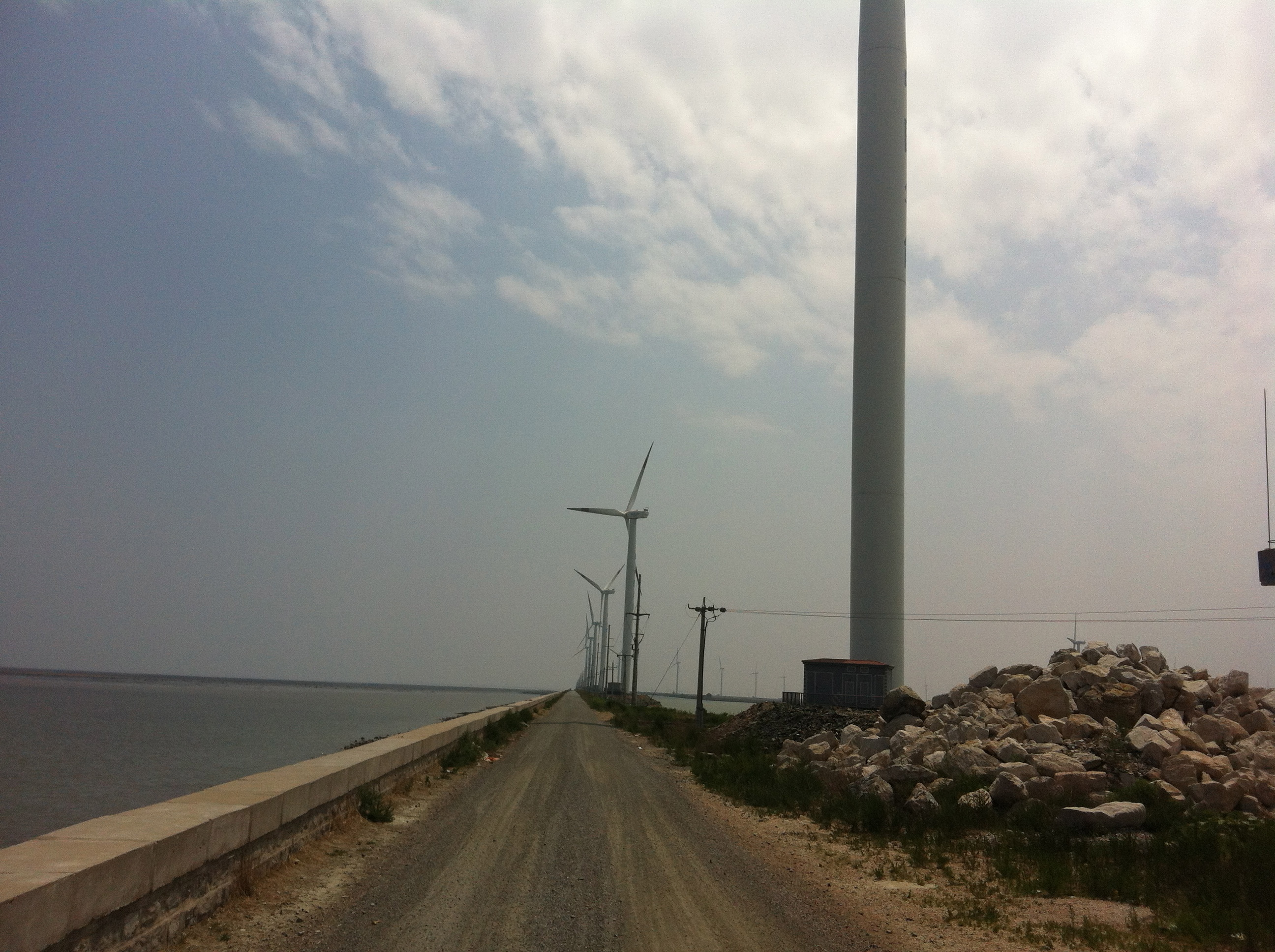
Wind turbines along the Bohai coast of Changyi City

Changyi City has 53 km (33 mi) of coastline, 430 mu (29 hectares or 72 acres) of shallow sea area, over 300,000 mu (20,000 ha or 49,000 acres) of tidal flats. In recent years, construction of the "yellow-blue areas" has built up an opportunity of national strategic importance, and the city has gone all out to speed up coastal development. The first is the strategic planning based on location and resources to establish development goals to create "one city, one district, one port, and four bases." "One city" means to construct the coastal city of advanced economy, complete and perfect infrastructure, sound ecological environment, livable modern coastal city. "One District" means to build the Binhai (Xiaying) Economic Development Zone into an influential modern economic coastal economic zone in the province or even nationally. "One port" means to accelerate the construction of the east port of Weifang Port (Xiaying Port). "Four bases" means to build an emerging industrial base of 100 billion yuan, a high-end chemical industrial base of 200 billion yuan, and a port logistics base of 20 million tons, and green energy base of two billion kilowatt-hour. The second is to improve the facilities. At present, Binhai Economic Development Zone (Xiaying) has completed the infrastructure investing over 10 billion yuan, supporting an area of over 90 square km, and has built a 616 square km coastal development framework, which has formed the initial concentration of industry, and distinctive Northern coastal ecosystems of industrial uplift belt. The third is to speed up port construction. Taking full advantage of the favorable natural conditions for port building in Xiaying, to speed up the construction of the East Port (Xiaying Port) of Weifang Port to create an important engine for the coastal economic development. The first phase of the project invests 100 billion yuan to build twelve 10-thousand-ton berths with an annual throughput of more than 20 million tons. The fourth is to promote industrial aggregation. Emphasizing the salt chemical industry chain investment and introduce new industries of strategic importance and actively develop new energy industry and advanced manufacturing. At present, 109 projects with a total investment of more than 33 billion yuan have been settled. The Haitian bio-chemical industry, new Jiayuan Chemical new dyes and other 47 projects were completed and commissioned; Jindian Chemical Industry, KDN pharmaceutical etc. 48 projects are under construction. The fifth is to improve the services. "The Beneficial policies for Investment in the Changyi Binhai Economic Development Zone" was developed to attract foreign investment, to give maximum discount in the fees charged and formalities. Promote the administrative services, such as safety supervision, industry and commerce, environmental protection, taxation, finance and other departments in the coastal economic development zone were set up with strong staff, to provide zero-distance service for projects and business development.

== Education ==
No. 1 High School, also known as 一中 (yī zhōng) in Changyi City. Approximately 7,000 students attend the school as of 2012

Changyi currently has 113 schools of various levels, a total of 72,330 students, and a total of 5,709 faculty and staff members. There are 146 kindergartens, 866 teachers and 16,390 custodians. In recent years, Changyi has won numerous national and provincial awards and honorary titles for its advancement in education and for promoting diverse education systems and pre-school education. In basic education, Changyi was the first in the province to implement the reform of Education in the People's Republic of China; and in the Weifang City Prefecture, Changyi was the first to begin consolidating high schools into the metropolitan areas. It has invested 400 million RMB on the new Changyi Number 1 High School, and has invested 120 million RMB to expand the Wenshan High School. It invested 150 million RMB to build the Changyi Foreign Language School. The city's primary school and secondary school enrollment rate is 100%, pre-school admission rate is 91.5%, and high school enrollment rate is 95.2%. It has completed 22 provincial standardized schools, 37 municipal standardized schools, and 22 provincial and municipal level, experiment, demonstration kindergartens. In the area of vocational education, since 2008, the integration of the city's eight vocational schools into the vocational education center, which now offers training in computer application, mechanical and electrical technology, and more than a dozen specialties, and built over 30 laboratories and training workshops. The employment rate of graduates is 100%, of which 95% found employments within their specialties. In 2010, based on the Vocational Education Center, the Changyi Branch of the Institute of Weifang Technic School was established, and planned the construction of a new campus of Vocational Education Center, covering an area of 548 mu (36.5 ha or 90 acres), with the building area of 200,000 square meters, total investment of 460 million yuan. School conditions continue to improve. Vigorously implementing the primary and secondary school building safety standardization, the city has invested nearly 400 million for new school buildings of 290,000 square meters, more than 16 million to create "Shandong model county for experimental teaching in primary and secondary schools." It invested more than 1900 million on implementation of the IT facilities and rural primary and secondary school distance education project. Education quality has been steadily improved in recent years. Each year, over 1600 students are enrolled in four-year colleges, of which average 10 people are admitted to Beijing University or Qinghua University. Changyi has four vocational schools, two high schools, and 29 middle schools. Changyi First High School and Wenshan High School are among the top high schools in Shandong Province.

== Demographics ==
The population in 1999 was 684,434.

Historical population
Year	Pop.	±% p.a.
1999	684,434	—
2016	580,000	−0.97%
1999 2016
