= List of administrative divisions of Shandong =

Administrative divisions of Shandong, a province of the People's Republic of China

Shandong Province
- Province
- Capital: Jinan

Prefecture-level divisions
- Sub-provincial cities: 2
- Prefectural cities: 14

County level divisions
- County cities: 26
- Counties: 52
- Districts: 58

Township level divisions
- Towns: 1,091
- Townships: 266
- Ethnic townships / towns^{*}: 1
- Subdistricts: 500

Villages level divisions
- Communities: 6,748
- Administrative villages: 74,215

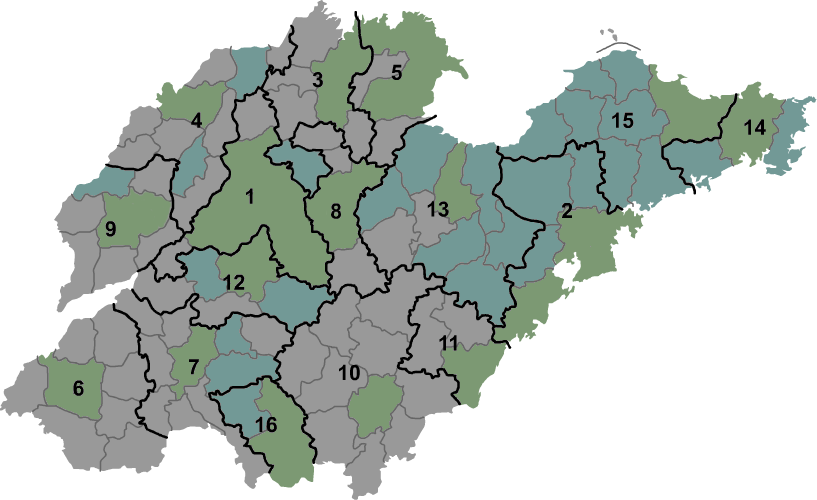
Third-level administrative divisions in Shandong: Districts County-level cities Counties

Shandong, a province of the People's Republic of China, is made up of the following administrative divisions.

== Administrative divisions ==
All of these administrative divisions are explained in greater detail at political divisions of China. This chart lists all prefecture-level and county-level divisions of Shandong.

Prefecture level	County Level				
Prefecture level	Name	Chinese	Hanyu Pinyin	Division code	
Jinan city 济南市; Jǐnán Shì (Note: not Jìnán) (Capital – Sub-provincial) (3701 / TNA)	Lixia District	历下区	Lìxià Qū	370102	LXQ
Jinan city 济南市; Jǐnán Shì (Capital – Sub-provincial) (3701 / TNA)	Shizhong District	市中区	Shìzhōng Qū	370103	SZQ
Jinan city 济南市; Jǐnán Shì (Capital – Sub-provincial) (3701 / TNA)	Huaiyin District	槐荫区	Huáiyīn Qū	370104	HYF
Jinan city 济南市; Jǐnán Shì (Capital – Sub-provincial) (3701 / TNA)	Tianqiao District	天桥区	Tiānqiáo Qū	370105	TQQ
Jinan city 济南市; Jǐnán Shì (Capital – Sub-provincial) (3701 / TNA)	Licheng District	历城区	Lìchéng Qū	370112	LCZ
Jinan city 济南市; Jǐnán Shì (Capital – Sub-provincial) (3701 / TNA)	Changqing District	长清区	Chángqīng Qū	370113	CQG
Jinan city 济南市; Jǐnán Shì (Capital – Sub-provincial) (3701 / TNA)	Zhangqiu District	章丘区	Zhāngqiū Qū	370114	ZQN
Jinan city 济南市; Jǐnán Shì (Capital – Sub-provincial) (3701 / TNA)	Jiyang District	济阳区	Jǐyáng Qū (Note: not Jìyáng)	370115	
Jinan city 济南市; Jǐnán Shì (Capital – Sub-provincial) (3701 / TNA)	Laiwu District	莱芜区	Láiwú Qū	370116	
Jinan city 济南市; Jǐnán Shì (Capital – Sub-provincial) (3701 / TNA)	Gangcheng District	钢城区	Gāngchéng Qū	370117	
Jinan city 济南市; Jǐnán Shì (Capital – Sub-provincial) (3701 / TNA)	Pingyin County	平阴县	Píngyīn Xiàn	370124	PYL
Jinan city 济南市; Jǐnán Shì (Capital – Sub-provincial) (3701 / TNA)	Shanghe County	商河县	Shānghé Xiàn	370126	SGH
Qingdao city 青岛市; Qīngdǎo Shì (Sub-provincial) (3702 / TAO)	Shinan District	市南区	Shìnán Qū	370202	SNQ
Qingdao city 青岛市; Qīngdǎo Shì (Sub-provincial) (3702 / TAO)	Shibei District	市北区	Shìběi Qū	370203	SBQ
Qingdao city 青岛市; Qīngdǎo Shì (Sub-provincial) (3702 / TAO)	Huangdao District	黄岛区	Huángdǎo Qū	370211	HDO
Qingdao city 青岛市; Qīngdǎo Shì (Sub-provincial) (3702 / TAO)	Laoshan District	崂山区	Láoshān Qū	370212	LQD
Qingdao city 青岛市; Qīngdǎo Shì (Sub-provincial) (3702 / TAO)	Licang District	李沧区	Lǐcāng Qū	370213	LCT
Qingdao city 青岛市; Qīngdǎo Shì (Sub-provincial) (3702 / TAO)	Chengyang District	城阳区	Chéngyáng Qū	370214	CEY
Qingdao city 青岛市; Qīngdǎo Shì (Sub-provincial) (3702 / TAO)	Jimo District	即墨区	Jìmò Qū	370215	
Qingdao city 青岛市; Qīngdǎo Shì (Sub-provincial) (3702 / TAO)	Jiaozhou city	胶州市	Jiāozhōu Shì	370281	JZS
Qingdao city 青岛市; Qīngdǎo Shì (Sub-provincial) (3702 / TAO)	Pingdu city	平度市	Píngdù Shì	370283	PDU
Qingdao city 青岛市; Qīngdǎo Shì (Sub-provincial) (3702 / TAO)	Laixi city	莱西市	Láixī Shì	370285	LXE
Zibo city 淄博市; Zībó Shì (3703 / ZBO)	Zichuan District	淄川区	Zīchuān Qū	370302	ZCQ
Zibo city 淄博市; Zībó Shì (3703 / ZBO)	Zhangdian District	张店区	Zhāngdiàn Qū	370303	ZDQ
Zibo city 淄博市; Zībó Shì (3703 / ZBO)	Boshan District	博山区	Bóshān Qū	370304	BSZ
Zibo city 淄博市; Zībó Shì (3703 / ZBO)	Linzi District	临淄区	Línzī Qū	370305	LZQ
Zibo city 淄博市; Zībó Shì (3703 / ZBO)	Zhoucun District	周村区	Zhōucūn Qū	370306	ZCN
Zibo city 淄博市; Zībó Shì (3703 / ZBO)	Huantai County	桓台县	Huántái Xiàn	370321	HTL
Zibo city 淄博市; Zībó Shì (3703 / ZBO)	Gaoqing County	高青县	Gāoqīng Xiàn	370322	GQG
Zibo city 淄博市; Zībó Shì (3703 / ZBO)	Yiyuan County	沂源县	Yíyuán Xiàn	370323	YIY
Zaozhuang city 枣庄市; Zǎozhuāng Shì (3704 / ZZG)	Shizhong District	市中区	Shìzhōng Qū	370402	SZZ
Zaozhuang city 枣庄市; Zǎozhuāng Shì (3704 / ZZG)	Yicheng District	峄城区	Yìchéng Qū	370403	XEC
Zaozhuang city 枣庄市; Zǎozhuāng Shì (3704 / ZZG)	Xuecheng District	薛城区	Xuēchéng Qū	370404	YZZ
Zaozhuang city 枣庄市; Zǎozhuāng Shì (3704 / ZZG)	Tai'erzhuang District	台儿庄区	Tái'érzhuāng Qū	370405	TEZ
Zaozhuang city 枣庄市; Zǎozhuāng Shì (3704 / ZZG)	Shanting District	山亭区	Shāntíng Qū	370406	STG
Zaozhuang city 枣庄市; Zǎozhuāng Shì (3704 / ZZG)	Tengzhou city	滕州市	Téngzhōu Shì	370481	TZO
Dongying city 东营市; Dōngyíng Shì (3705 / DYG)	Dongying District	东营区	Dōngyíng Qū	370502	DYQ
Dongying city 东营市; Dōngyíng Shì (3705 / DYG)	Hekou District	河口区	Hékǒu Qū	370503	HKO
Dongying city 东营市; Dōngyíng Shì (3705 / DYG)	Kenli District	垦利区	Kěnlì Qū	370505	KEL
Dongying city 东营市; Dōngyíng Shì (3705 / DYG)	Lijin County	利津县	Lìjīn Xiàn	370522	LJN
Dongying city 东营市; Dōngyíng Shì (3705 / DYG)	Guangrao County	广饶县	Guǎngráo Xiàn	370523	GRO
Yantai city 烟台市; Yāntái Shì (3706 / YNT)	Zhifu District	芝罘区	Zhīfú Qū	370602	ZFQ
Yantai city 烟台市; Yāntái Shì (3706 / YNT)	Fushan District	福山区	Fúshān Qū	370611	FUS
Yantai city 烟台市; Yāntái Shì (3706 / YNT)	Muping District	牟平区	Mùpíng Qū (Note: not Móupíng)	370612	MPQ
Yantai city 烟台市; Yāntái Shì (3706 / YNT)	Laishan District	莱山区	Láishān Qū	370613	LYT
Yantai city 烟台市; Yāntái Shì (3706 / YNT)	Penglai District	蓬莱区	Pénglái Qū	370614	
Yantai city 烟台市; Yāntái Shì (3706 / YNT)	Longkou city	龙口市	Lóngkǒu Shì	370681	LKU
Yantai city 烟台市; Yāntái Shì (3706 / YNT)	Laiyang city	莱阳市	Láiyáng Shì	370682	LYD
Yantai city 烟台市; Yāntái Shì (3706 / YNT)	Laizhou city	莱州市	Láizhōu Shì	370683	LZG
Yantai city 烟台市; Yāntái Shì (3706 / YNT)	Zhaoyuan City	招远市	Zhāoyuǎn Shì	370685	ZYL
Yantai city 烟台市; Yāntái Shì (3706 / YNT)	Qixia city	栖霞市	Qīxiá Shì	370686	QXS
Yantai city 烟台市; Yāntái Shì (3706 / YNT)	Haiyang city	海阳市	Hǎiyáng Shì	370687	HYL
Weifang city 潍坊市; Wéifāng Shì (3707 / WEF)	Weicheng District	潍城区	Wéichéng Qū	370702	WCG
Weifang city 潍坊市; Wéifāng Shì (3707 / WEF)	Hanting District	寒亭区	Hántíng Qū	370703	HNT
Weifang city 潍坊市; Wéifāng Shì (3707 / WEF)	Fangzi District	坊子区	Fāngzi Qū	370704	FZQ
Weifang city 潍坊市; Wéifāng Shì (3707 / WEF)	Kuiwen District	奎文区	Kuíwén Qū	370705	KWN
Weifang city 潍坊市; Wéifāng Shì (3707 / WEF)	Linqu County	临朐县	Línqú Xiàn	370724	LNQ
Weifang city 潍坊市; Wéifāng Shì (3707 / WEF)	Changle County	昌乐县	Chānglè Xiàn	370725	CLX
Weifang city 潍坊市; Wéifāng Shì (3707 / WEF)	Qingzhou city	青州市	Qīngzhōu Shì	370781	QGZ
Weifang city 潍坊市; Wéifāng Shì (3707 / WEF)	Zhucheng city	诸城市	Zhūchéng Shì	370782	ZCL
Weifang city 潍坊市; Wéifāng Shì (3707 / WEF)	Shouguang city	寿光市	Shòuguāng Shì	370783	SGG
Weifang city 潍坊市; Wéifāng Shì (3707 / WEF)	Anqiu city	安丘市	Ānqiū Shì	370784	AQU
Weifang city 潍坊市; Wéifāng Shì (3707 / WEF)	Gaomi city	高密市	Gāomì Shì	370785	GMI
Weifang city 潍坊市; Wéifāng Shì (3707 / WEF)	Changyi city	昌邑市	Chāngyì Shì	370786	CYL
Jining city 济宁市; Jǐníng Shì (Note: not Jìníng) (3708 / JNG)	Rencheng District	任城区	Rènchéng Qū	370811	RCQ
Jining city 济宁市; Jǐníng Shì (3708 / JNG)	Yanzhou District	兖州区	Yǎnzhōu Qū	370812	YZN
Jining city 济宁市; Jǐníng Shì (3708 / JNG)	Weishan County	微山县	Wēishān Xiàn	370826	WSA
Jining city 济宁市; Jǐníng Shì (3708 / JNG)	Yutai County	鱼台县	Yútái Xiàn	370827	YTL
Jining city 济宁市; Jǐníng Shì (3708 / JNG)	Jinxiang County	金乡县	Jīnxiāng Xiàn	370828	JXG
Jining city 济宁市; Jǐníng Shì (3708 / JNG)	Jiaxiang County	嘉祥县	Jiāxiáng Xiàn	370829	JXP
Jining city 济宁市; Jǐníng Shì (3708 / JNG)	Wenshang County	汶上县	Wénshàng Xiàn	370830	WNS
Jining city 济宁市; Jǐníng Shì (3708 / JNG)	Sishui County	泗水县	Sìshuǐ Xiàn	370831	SSH
Jining city 济宁市; Jǐníng Shì (3708 / JNG)	Liangshan County	梁山县	Liángshān Xiàn	370832	LSN
Jining city 济宁市; Jǐníng Shì (3708 / JNG)	Qufu city	曲阜市	Qūfù Shì	370881	QFU
Jining city 济宁市; Jǐníng Shì (3708 / JNG)	Zoucheng city	邹城市	Zōuchéng Shì	370883	ZCG
Tai'an city 泰安市; Tài'ān Shì (3709 / TAI)	Taishan District	泰山区	Tàishān Qū	370902	TSQ
Tai'an city 泰安市; Tài'ān Shì (3709 / TAI)	Daiyue District	岱岳区	Dàiyuè Qū	370911	DYU
Tai'an city 泰安市; Tài'ān Shì (3709 / TAI)	Ningyang County	宁阳县	Níngyáng Xiàn	370921	NGY
Tai'an city 泰安市; Tài'ān Shì (3709 / TAI)	Dongping County	东平县	Dōngpíng Xiàn	370923	DPG
Tai'an city 泰安市; Tài'ān Shì (3709 / TAI)	Xintai city	新泰市	Xīntài Shì	370982	XTA
Tai'an city 泰安市; Tài'ān Shì (3709 / TAI)	Feicheng city	肥城市	Féichéng Shì	370983	FEC
Weihai city 威海市; Wēihǎi Shì (3710 / WEH)	Huancui District	环翠区	Huáncuì Qū	371002	HNC
Weihai city 威海市; Wēihǎi Shì (3710 / WEH)	Wendeng District	文登区	Wéndēng Qū	371003	WDN
Weihai city 威海市; Wēihǎi Shì (3710 / WEH)	Rongcheng city	荣成市	Róngchéng Shì	371082	RCS
Weihai city 威海市; Wēihǎi Shì (3710 / WEH)	Rushan city	乳山市	Rǔshān Shì	371083	RSN
Rizhao city 日照市; Rìzhào Shì (3711 / RZH)	Donggang District	东港区	Dōnggǎng Qū	371102	DGR
Rizhao city 日照市; Rìzhào Shì (3711 / RZH)	Lanshan District	岚山区	Lánshān Qū	371103	LAH
Rizhao city 日照市; Rìzhào Shì (3711 / RZH)	Wulian County	五莲县	Wǔlián Xiàn	371121	WLN
Rizhao city 日照市; Rìzhào Shì (3711 / RZH)	Juxian County (Note: Official name registered by the Ministry of Civil Affairs.)	莒县	Jǔxiàn	371122	JUX
Linyi city 临沂市; Línyí Shì (3713 / LYI)	Lanshan District	兰山区	Lánshān Qū	371302	LLS
Linyi city 临沂市; Línyí Shì (3713 / LYI)	Luozhuang District	罗庄区	Luózhuāng Qū	371311	LZU
Linyi city 临沂市; Línyí Shì (3713 / LYI)	Hedong District	河东区	Hédōng Qū	371312	HDL
Linyi city 临沂市; Línyí Shì (3713 / LYI)	Yinan County	沂南县	Yínán Xiàn	371321	YNN
Linyi city 临沂市; Línyí Shì (3713 / LYI)	Tancheng County	郯城县	Tánchéng Xiàn	371322	TCE
Linyi city 临沂市; Línyí Shì (3713 / LYI)	Yishui County	沂水县	Yíshuǐ Xiàn	371323	YIS
Linyi city 临沂市; Línyí Shì (3713 / LYI)	Lanling County	兰陵县	Lánlíng Xiàn	371324	LLA
Linyi city 临沂市; Línyí Shì (3713 / LYI)	Feixian County	费县	Fèixiàn	371325	FEI
Linyi city 临沂市; Línyí Shì (3713 / LYI)	Pingyi County	平邑县	Píngyì Xiàn	371326	PYI
Linyi city 临沂市; Línyí Shì (3713 / LYI)	Junan County	莒南县	Jǔnán Xiàn	371327	JNB
Linyi city 临沂市; Línyí Shì (3713 / LYI)	Mengyin County	蒙阴县	Méngyīn Xiàn	371328	MYL
Linyi city 临沂市; Línyí Shì (3713 / LYI)	Linshu County	临沭县	Línshù Xiàn	371329	LSP
Dezhou city 德州市; Dézhōu Shì (3714 / DZS)	Decheng District	德城区	Déchéng Qū	371402	DCD
Dezhou city 德州市; Dézhōu Shì (3714 / DZS)	Lingcheng District	陵城区	Língchéng Qū	371403	LDZ
Dezhou city 德州市; Dézhōu Shì (3714 / DZS)	Ningjin County	宁津县	Níngjīn Xiàn	371422	NGJ
Dezhou city 德州市; Dézhōu Shì (3714 / DZS)	Qingyun County	庆云县	Qìngyún Xiàn	371423	QYL
Dezhou city 德州市; Dézhōu Shì (3714 / DZS)	Linyi County	临邑县	Línyì Xiàn	371424	LYM
Dezhou city 德州市; Dézhōu Shì (3714 / DZS)	Qihe County	齐河县	Qíhé Xiàn	371425	QIH
Dezhou city 德州市; Dézhōu Shì (3714 / DZS)	Pingyuan County	平原县	Píngyuán Xiàn	371426	PYN
Dezhou city 德州市; Dézhōu Shì (3714 / DZS)	Xiajin County	夏津县	Xiàjīn Xiàn	371427	XAJ
Dezhou city 德州市; Dézhōu Shì (3714 / DZS)	Wucheng County	武城县	Wǔchéng Xiàn	371428	WUC
Dezhou city 德州市; Dézhōu Shì (3714 / DZS)	Leling city	乐陵市	Lèlíng Shì	371481	LEL
Dezhou city 德州市; Dézhōu Shì (3714 / DZS)	Yucheng city	禹城市	Yǔchéng Shì	371482	YCL
Liaocheng city 聊城市; Liáochéng Shì (3715 / LCH)	Dongchangfu District	东昌府区	Dōngchāngfǔ Qū	371502	DCF
Liaocheng city 聊城市; Liáochéng Shì (3715 / LCH)	Chiping District	茌平区	Chípíng Qū	371503	YGU
Liaocheng city 聊城市; Liáochéng Shì (3715 / LCH)	Yanggu County	阳谷县	Yánggǔ Xiàn	371521	SHN
Liaocheng city 聊城市; Liáochéng Shì (3715 / LCH)	Shenxian County	莘县	Shēnxiàn	371522	CPG
Liaocheng city 聊城市; Liáochéng Shì (3715 / LCH)	Dong'e County	东阿县	Dōng'ē Xiàn (Note: not Dōng'ā)	371524	DGE
Liaocheng city 聊城市; Liáochéng Shì (3715 / LCH)	Guanxian County	冠县	Guānxiàn (Note: not Guànxiàn)	371525	GXL
Liaocheng city 聊城市; Liáochéng Shì (3715 / LCH)	Gaotang County	高唐县	Gāotáng Xiàn	371526	GTG
Liaocheng city 聊城市; Liáochéng Shì (3715 / LCH)	Linqing city	临清市	Línqīng Shì	371581	LQS
Binzhou city 滨州市; Bīnzhōu Shì (3716 / BZH)	Bincheng District	滨城区	Bīnchéng Qū	371602	BCH
Binzhou city 滨州市; Bīnzhōu Shì (3716 / BZH)	Zhanhua District	沾化区	Zhānhuà Qū	371603	ZHN
Binzhou city 滨州市; Bīnzhōu Shì (3716 / BZH)	Huimin County	惠民县	Huìmín Xiàn	371621	HMN
Binzhou city 滨州市; Bīnzhōu Shì (3716 / BZH)	Yangxin County	阳信县	Yángxìn Xiàn	371622	YXN
Binzhou city 滨州市; Bīnzhōu Shì (3716 / BZH)	Wudi County	无棣县	Wúdì Xiàn	371623	WDI
Binzhou city 滨州市; Bīnzhōu Shì (3716 / BZH)	Boxing County	博兴县	Bóxīng Xiàn	371625	BOX
Binzhou city 滨州市; Bīnzhōu Shì (3716 / BZH)	Zouping city	邹平市	Zōupíng Shì	371681	
Heze city 菏泽市; Hézé Shì (3717 / HZS)	Mudan District	牡丹区	Mǔdān Qū	371702	MDQ
Heze city 菏泽市; Hézé Shì (3717 / HZS)	Dingtao District	定陶区	Dìngtáo Qū	371703	DTN
Heze city 菏泽市; Hézé Shì (3717 / HZS)	Caoxian County	曹县	Cáoxiàn	371721	CAO
Heze city 菏泽市; Hézé Shì (3717 / HZS)	Shanxian County	单县	Shànxiàn (Note: not Dānxiàn)	371722	SXN
Heze city 菏泽市; Hézé Shì (3717 / HZS)	Chengwu County	成武县	Chéngwǔ Xiàn	371723	CWX
Heze city 菏泽市; Hézé Shì (3717 / HZS)	Juye County	巨野县	Jùyě Xiàn	371724	JYE
Heze city 菏泽市; Hézé Shì (3717 / HZS)	Yuncheng County	郓城县	Yùnchéng Xiàn	371725	YCR
Heze city 菏泽市; Hézé Shì (3717 / HZS)	Juancheng County	鄄城县	Juànchéng Xiàn	371726	JNC
Heze city 菏泽市; Hézé Shì (3717 / HZS)	Dongming County	东明县	Dōngmíng Xiàn	371728	DMG

== Recent changes in administrative divisions ==
Date	Before	After	Note	Reference
1981-05-27	Changwei Prefecture	Weifang Prefecture	renamed	
1982-01-23	Tai'an County	Tai'an (PC-City)	reorganized	
1982-08-02	Xinwen County	Xinwen (PC-City)	reorganized	
1982-11-10	parts of Bin County	Binzhou (PC-City)	established	
1982-11-10	parts of Boxing County	Binzhou (PC-City)	established	
1982-11-10	parts of Huimin Prefecture	Dongying (P-City)	established	
1982-11-10	↳ parts of Zhanhua County	↳ Hekou District	established	
1982-11-10	↳ Lijin County	↳ Hekou District	established	
1982-11-10	↳ Lijin County	↳ Lijin County	transferred	
1982-11-10	↳ parts of Guangrao County	↳ Dongying District	established	
1982-11-10	↳ parts of Boxing County	↳ Dongying District	established	
1982-11-10	↳ Kenli County	↳ Dongying District	established	
1982-11-10	↳ Kenli County	↳ Kenli County	transferred	
1982-11-10	↳ Kenli County	↳ Niuzhuang District	established	
1982-11-10	↳ parts of Lijin County	↳ Niuzhuang District	established	
1983-01-18	all Province-controlled city (P-City) → Prefecture-level city (PL-City)			Civil Affairs Announcement
1983-01-18	all Prefecture-controlled city (PC-City) → County-level city (CL-City)			Civil Affairs Announcement
1983-08-30	Yantai Prefecture	Yantai (PL-City) city district	reorganized	
1983-08-30	↳ Yantai (CL-City)	Yantai (PL-City) city district	disestablished	
1983-08-30	↳ Fushan County	Yantai (PL-City) city district	disestablished	
1983-08-30	parts of Yantai Prefecture	Qingdao (PL-City)	transferred	
1983-08-30	↳ Laixi County	↳ Laixi County	transferred	
1983-08-30	Weifang Prefecture	Weifang (PL-City) city district	reorganized	
1983-08-30	↳ Weifang (CL-City)	Weifang (PL-City) city district	disestablished	
1983-08-30	parts of Weifang Prefecture	Qingdao (PL-City)	transferred	
1983-08-30	↳ Pingdu County	↳ Pingdu County	transferred	
1983-08-30	Jining Prefecture	Jining (PL-City) city district	reorganized	
1983-08-30	↳ Jining (CL-City)	Jining (PL-City) city district	disestablished	
1983-08-30	↳ Jining County	Jining (PL-City) city district	disestablished	
1983-08-30	parts of Jining Prefecture	Tai'an Prefecture	transferred	
1983-08-30	↳ Sishui County	↳ Sishui County	transferred	
1983-08-30	↳ Wenshang County	↳ Wenshang County	transferred	
1983-08-30	parts of Huimin Prefecture	Zibo (PL-City)	transferred	
1983-08-30	↳ Huantai County	↳ Huantai County	transferred	
1983-08-30	parts of Huimin Prefecture	Dongying (PL-City)	transferred	
1983-08-30	↳ Guangrao County	↳ Guangrao County	transferred	
1983-08-30	Linyi County	Linyi (CL-City)	reorganized	
1983-08-30	Laiwu County	Laiwu (CL-City)	reorganized	
1983-08-30	Xintai County	Xintai (CL-City)	reorganized	
1983-08-30	Xinwen (CL-City)	Xintai (CL-City)	merged into	
1983-08-30	Heze County	Heze (CL-City)	reorganized	
1983-08-30	Liaocheng County	Liaocheng (CL-City)	reorganized	
1983-08-30	Linqing County	Linqing (CL-City)	reorganized	
1983-10-15	Yantai (PL-City) city district	Zhifu District	established	
1983-10-15	Yantai (PL-City) city district	Fushan District	established	
1983-10-15	Weifang (PL-City) city district	Weicheng District	established	
1983-10-15	Weifang (PL-City) city district	Hanting District	established	
1983-10-15	Weifang (PL-City) city district	Fangzi District	established	
1983-10-15	Jining (PL-City) city district	Shizhong District, Jining	established	
1983-10-15	Jining (PL-City) city district	Shijiao, Jining District	established	
1983-11-15	Qicun District	Shanting District	renamed	
1985-02-22	Rizhao County	Rizhao (CL-City)	reorganized	
1985-03-27	Tai'an Prefecture	Tai'an (PL-City)	reorganized	
1985-03-27	Tai'an (CL-City)	Taishan District	established	
1985-03-27	Tai'an (CL-City)	Jiao District, Tai'an	established	
1985-03-27	parts of Tai'an Prefecture	Jining (PL-City)	transferred	
1985-03-27	↳ Wenshang County	↳ Wenshang County	transferred	
1985-03-27	↳ Sishui County	↳ Sishui County	transferred	
1985-03-27	parts of Tai'an Prefecture	Jinan (PL-City)	transferred	
1985-03-27	↳ Pingyin County	↳ Pingyin County	transferred	
1986-03-01	Yidu County	Qingzhou (CL-City)	reorganized	
1986-06-02	Qufu County	Qufu (CL-City)	reorganized	
1986-09-23	Huang County	Longkou (CL-City)	reorganized	
1987-02-12	Jiao County	Jiaozhou (CL-City)	reorganized	
1987-02-20	Laiyang County	Laiyang (CL-City)	reorganized	
1987-02-25	Bin County	Binzhou (CL-City)	merged into	
1987-04-11	Licheng County	Licheng District	reorganized	
1987-04-11	Jiao District, Jinan	Licheng District	merged into	
1987-04-20	Zhucheng County	Zhucheng (CL-City)	reorganized	
1987-06-10	Niuzhuang District	Dongying District	disestablished & merged into	
1987-06-10	Niuzhuang District	Hekou District	disestablished & merged into	
1987-06-15	parts of Yantai (PL-City)	Weihai (PL-City)	established	
1987-06-15	↳ Weihai (CL-City)	↳ Huancui District	transferred & reorganized	
1987-06-15	↳ Wendeng County	↳ Wendeng County	transferred	
1987-06-15	↳ Rongcheng County	↳ Rongcheng County	transferred	
1987-06-15	↳ Rushan County	↳ Rushan County	transferred	
1988-02-24	Ye County	Laizhou (CL-City)	reorganized	
1988-03-07	Teng County	Tengzhou (CL-City)	reorganized	
1988-09-01	Leling County	Leling (CL-City)	reorganized	
1988-10-24	Wendeng County	Wendeng (CL-City)	reorganized	
1988-11-01	Rongcheng County	Rongcheng (CL-City)	reorganized	
1988-11-17	Laoshan County	Laoshan District	reorganized	
1989-12-02	parts of Dezhou Prefecture	Jinan (PL-City)	transferred	
1989-12-02	↳ Jiyang County	↳ Jiyang County	transferred	
1989-12-02	↳ Shanghe County	↳ Shanghe County	transferred	
1989-12-02	parts of Huimin Prefecture	Zibo (PL-City)	transferred	
1989-12-02	↳ Gaoqing County	↳ Gaoqing County	transferred	
1989-12-02	parts of Linyi Prefecture	Zibo (PL-City)	transferred	
1989-12-02	↳ Yiyuan County	↳ Yiyuan County	transferred	
1989-12-02	parts of Heze Prefecture	Jining (PL-City)	transferred	
1989-12-02	↳ Liangshan County	↳ Liangshan County	transferred	
1989-06-12	parts of Linyi Prefecture	Rizhao (PL-City) city district	established	
1989-06-12	↳ Rizhao (CL-City)	Rizhao (PL-City) city district	disestablished	
1989-07-27	Jimo County	Jimo (CL-City)	reorganized	
1989-07-27	Pingdu County	Pingdu (CL-City)	reorganized	
1990-12-18	Jiaonan County	Jiaonan (CL-City)	reorganized	Civil Affairs [1990]117
1990-12-18	Laixi County	Laixi (CL-City)	reorganized	
1991-11-30	Penglai County	Penglai (CL-City)	reorganized	Civil Affairs [1991]74
1991-12-21	Zhaoyuan County	Zhaoyuan (CL-City)	reorganized	Civil Affairs [1991]94
1992-02-12	Huimin Prefecture	Binzhou Prefecture	renamed	Civil Affairs [1992]15
1992-08-01	Yanzhou County	Yanzhou (CL-City)	reorganized	Civil Affairs [1992]85
1992-08-01	Feicheng County	Feicheng (CL-City)	reorganized	Civil Affairs [1992]83
1992-08-01	Zhangqiu County	Zhangqiu (CL-City)	reorganized	Civil Affairs [1992]84
1992-12-07	Rizhao (PL-City) city district	Donggang District	established	Civil Affairs [1992]158
1992-12-07	parts of Weifang (PL-City)	Rizhao (PL-City)	transferred	Civil Affairs [1992]158
1992-12-07	↳ Wulian County	↳ Wulian County	transferred	Civil Affairs [1992]158
1992-12-07	parts of Linyi Prefecture	Rizhao (PL-City)	transferred	Civil Affairs [1992]158
1992-12-07	↳ Ju County	↳ Ju County	transferred	Civil Affairs [1992]158
1992-12-21	parts of Tai'an (PL-City)	Laiwu (PL-City)	established	State Council [1992]182
1992-12-21	↳ Laiwu (CL-City)	↳ Laicheng District	transferred & reorganized	State Council [1992]182
1992-12-21	↳ Laiwu (CL-City)	↳ Gangcheng District	transferred & established	State Council [1992]182
1993-06-01	Shouguang County	Shouguang (CL-City)	reorganized	Civil Affairs [1993]116
1993-07-17	Rushan County	Rushan (CL-City)	reorganized	Civil Affairs [1993]153
1993-09-09	Yucheng County	Yucheng (CL-City)	reorganized	
1993-12-14	Jiao District, Jining	Rencheng District	renamed	Civil Affairs [1993]243
1994-01-18	Anqiu County	Anqiu (CL-City)	reorganized	Civil Affairs [1994]7
1994-05-18	Taidong District	Shibei District	merged into	State Council [1994]32
1994-05-18	Cangkou District	Licang District	disestablished & established	State Council [1994]32
1994-05-18	Cangkou District	Chengyang District	disestablished & established	State Council [1994]32
1994-05-18	Gaomi County	Gaomi (CL-City)	reorganized	Civil Affairs [1994]35
1994-05-23	parts of Fangzi District	Kuiwen District	established	State Council [1994]35
1994-06-10	Changyi County	Changyi (CL-City)	reorganized	Civil Affairs [1994]92
1994-09-29	Muping County	Muping District	reorganized	State Council [1994]69
1994-09-29	Muping County	Laishan District	established	State Council [1994]69
1994-12-17	Linyi Prefecture	Linyi (PL-City)	reorganized	State Council [1994]131
1994-12-17	Linyi (CL-City)	Lanshan District, Linyi	disestablished & established	State Council [1994]131
1994-12-17	Linyi (CL-City)	Luozhuang District	disestablished & established	State Council [1994]131
1994-12-17	Linyi (CL-City)	Hedong District	disestablished & established	State Council [1994]131
1994-12-17	Dezhou Prefecture	Dezhou (PL-City)	reorganized	State Council [1994]132
1994-12-17	Dezhou (CL-City)	Decheng District	reorganized	State Council [1994]132
1995-06-10	Qixia County	Qixia (CL-City)	reorganized	Civil Affairs [1995]78
1996-04-29	Haiyang County	Haiyang (CL-City)	reorganized	Civil Affairs [1996]27
1997-08-29	Liaocheng Prefecture	Liaocheng (PL-City)	reorganized	State Council [1997]82
1997-08-29	Liaocheng (CL-City)	Dongchangfu District	reorganized	State Council [1997]82
2000-04-19	Jiao District, Tai'an	Daiyue District	renamed	
2000-06-18	Binzhou Prefecture	Binzhou (PL-City)	reorganized	
2000-06-18	Binzhou (CL-City)	Bincheng District	reorganized	
2000-06-23	Heze Prefecture	Heze (PL-City)	reorganized	
2000-06-23	Heze (CL-City)	Mudan District	reorganized	
2001-06-26	Changqing County	Changqing District	reorganized	State Council [2001]73
2004-09-09	parts of Donggang District	Lanshan District, Rizhao	established	State Council [2004]71
2012-09-30	Sifang District	Shibei District	merged into	State Council [2012]153
2012-09-30	Jiaonan (CL-City)	Huangdao District	merged into	State Council [2012]153
2013-10-18	Shizhong District, Jining	Rencheng District	merged into	State Council [2013]115
2013-10-18	Yanzhou (CL-City)	Yanzhou District	reorganized	State Council [2013]115
2014-01-08	Cangshan County	Lanling County	renamed	State Council [2015]6
2014-01-25	Wendeng (CL-City)	Wendeng District	reorganized	State Council [2015]13
2014-09-09	Zhanhua County	Zhanhua District	reorganized	State Council [2015]119
2014-10-20	Ling County	Lingcheng District	reorganized	State Council [2015]139
2016-01-07	Dingtao County	Dingtao District	reorganized	State Council [2016]7
2016-06-08	Kenli County	Kenli District	reorganized	State Council [2016]105
2016-09-14	Zhangqiu (CL-City)	Zhangqiu District	reorganized	State Council [2016]155
2017-07-18	Jimo (CL-City)	Jimo District	reorganized	State Council [2017]105
2018-06-19	Jiyang County	Jiyang District	reorganized	State Council [2018]86
2018-07-02	Zouping County	Zouping (CL-City)	reorganized	Civil Affairs [2018]105
2018-12-26	Laiwu (PL-City)	Jinan (PL-City)	disestablished & merged into	State Council [2018]163
2018-12-26	↳ Laicheng District	↳ Laiwu District	transferred & renamed	State Council [2018]163
2018-12-26	↳ Gangcheng District	↳ Gangcheng District	transferred	State Council [2018]163
2019-06-27	Chiping County	Chiping District	reorganized	State Council [2019]60
2020-06-??	Penglai (CL-City)	Penglai District	reorganized	
2020-06-??	Changdao County	Penglai District	merged into	

== Population composition ==
=== Prefectures ===
Prefecture	2010	2000
Jinan	6,814,000	5,921,700
Qingdao	8,715,100	7,494,200
Binzhou	3,748,500	3,564,100
Dezhou	5,568,200	5,293,700
Dongying	2,035,300	1,793,000
Heze	8,287,800	8,098,000
Jining	8,081,900	7,740,300
Laiwu	1,298,500	1,233,500
Liaocheng	5,789,900	5,411,900
Linyi	10,690,000	9,942,600
Rizhao	2,801,100	
Tai'an	5,494,200	5,334,600
Weifang	9,086,200	8,495,300
Weihai	2,804,800	2,597,000
Yantai	6,968,200	6,635,700
Zaozhuang	3,729,300	3,546,600
Zibo	4,530,600	4,184,800

=== Counties ===
Name	Prefecture	2010
Lixia	Jinan	754,100
Shizhong	Jinan	713,600
Huaiyin	Jinan	476,800
Tianqiao	Jinan	688,400
Licheng	Jinan	1,124,300
Changqing	Jinan	578,700
Zhangqiu	Jinan	1,064,200
Pingyin	Jinan	331,700
Jiyang	Jinan	517,900
Shanghe	Jinan	564,100
Shinan	Qingdao	544,800
Shibei	Qingdao	558,200
Licang	Qingdao	512,400
Xihai'an	Qingdao	524,200
Laoshan	Qingdao	379,500
Chengyang	Qingdao	737,200
Jimo	Qingdao	1,177,200
Jiaozhou	Qingdao	843,100
Pingdu	Qingdao	1,357,400
Laixi	Qingdao	750,200
Zichuan	Zibo	731,900
Zhangdian	Zibo	929,200
Boshan	Zibo	463,000
Linzi	Zibo	642,800
Zhoucun	Zibo	362,300
Huantai	Zibo	504,000
Gaoqing	Zibo	347,900
Yiyuan	Zibo	549,500
Shizhong	Zaozhuang	535,500
Xuecheng	Zaozhuang	481,400
Yicheng	Zaozhuang	364,200
Tai'erzhuang	Zaozhuang	279,500
Shanting	Zaozhuang	465,000
Tengzhou	Zaozhuang	1,603,700
Dongying	Dongying	756,700
Hekou	Dongying	247,600
Kenli	Dongying	242,300
Lijin	Dongying	281,200
Guangrao	Dongying	507,500
Zhifu	Yantai	830,200
Fushan	Yantai	644,800
Muping	Yantai	467,600
Laishan	Yantai	285,100
Longkou	Yantai	688,300
Laiyang	Yantai	878,600
Laizhou	Yantai	883,900
Penglai	Yantai	451,100
Zhaoyuan	Yantai	566,200
Qixia	Yantai	589,700
Haiyang	Yantai	638,700
Weicheng	Weifang	415,100
Hanting	Weifang	424,100
Fangzi	Weifang	512,200
Kuiwen	Weifang	525,900
Linqu	Weifang	834,300
Changle	Weifang	615,900
Qingzhou	Weifang	940,400
Zhucheng	Weifang	1,086,200
Shouguang	Weifang	1,139,400
Anqiu	Weifang	926,900
Gaomi	Weifang	895,600
Changyi	Weifang	603,500
Rencheng	Jining	526,400
Yanzhou	Jining	744,200
Weishan	Jining	633,400
Yutai	Jining	437,100
Jinxiang	Jining	625,300
Jiaxiang	Jining	818,200
Wenshang	Jining	684,600
Sishui	Jining	536,100
Liangshan	Jining	730,700
Qufu	Jining	640,500
Zoucheng	Jining	1,116,700
Taishan	Tai'an	760,100
Daiyue	Tai'an	975,400
Ningyang	Tai'an	754,600
Dongping	Tai'an	741,600
Xintai	Tai'an	1,315,900
Feicheng	Tai'an	946,600
Huancui	Weihai	908,200
Wendeng	Weihai	609,700
Rongcheng	Weihai	714,400
Rushan	Weihai	572,500
Donggang	Rizhao	920,500
Lanshan	Rizhao	400,100
Ju(xian)	Rizhao	995,600
Wulian	Rizhao	484,900
Laicheng	Laiwu	989,500
Gangcheng	Laiwu	309,000
Lanshan	Linyi	1,274,200
Luozhuang	Linyi	660,600
Hedong	Linyi	665,400
Yinan	Linyi	790,900
Tancheng	Linyi	838,000
Yishui	Linyi	998,300
Cangshan → Lanling	Linyi	1,161,900
Fei(xian)	Linyi	757,000
Pingyi	Linyi	900,100
Junan	Linyi	886,400
Mengyin	Linyi	489,500
Linshu	Linyi	617,100
Decheng	Dezhou	679,600
Ling(xian) → Lingcheng	Dezhou	569,000
Ningjin	Dezhou	449,900
Qingyun	Dezhou	294,700
Linyi	Dezhou	511,100
Qihe	Dezhou	602,000
Pingyuan	Dezhou	442,900
Xiajin	Dezhou	500,500
Wucheng	Dezhou	376,100
Leling	Dezhou	652,400
Yucheng	Dezhou	490,000
Dongchangfu	Liaocheng	1,229,800
Yanggu	Liaocheng	770,700
Shen(xian)	Liaocheng	958,800
Chiping	Liaocheng	520,100
Dong'e	Liaocheng	352,600
Guan(xian)	Liaocheng	764,900
Gaotang	Liaocheng	473,400
Linqing	Liaocheng	719,600
Bincheng	Binzhou	566,100
Huimin	Binzhou	602,500
Yangxin	Binzhou	427,000
Wudi	Binzhou	418,700
Boxing	Binzhou	487,100
Zouping	Binzhou	778,800
Zhanhua	Binzhou	116,600
Mudan	Heze	1,346,700
Cao(xian)	Heze	1,365,700
Shan(xian)	Heze	1,063,200
Chengwu	Heze	612,000
Juye	Heze	860,600
Yuncheng	Heze	1,040,700
Juancheng	Heze	721,900
Dingtao	Heze	565,800
Dongming	Heze	711,100
Sifang (disestablished)	Qingdao	462,500
Jiaonan (disestablished)	Qingdao	868,400
Shizhong (disestablished)	Jining	588,900
Changdao (disestablished)	Yantai	44,000
