= Yi River (Shandong) =

River in China

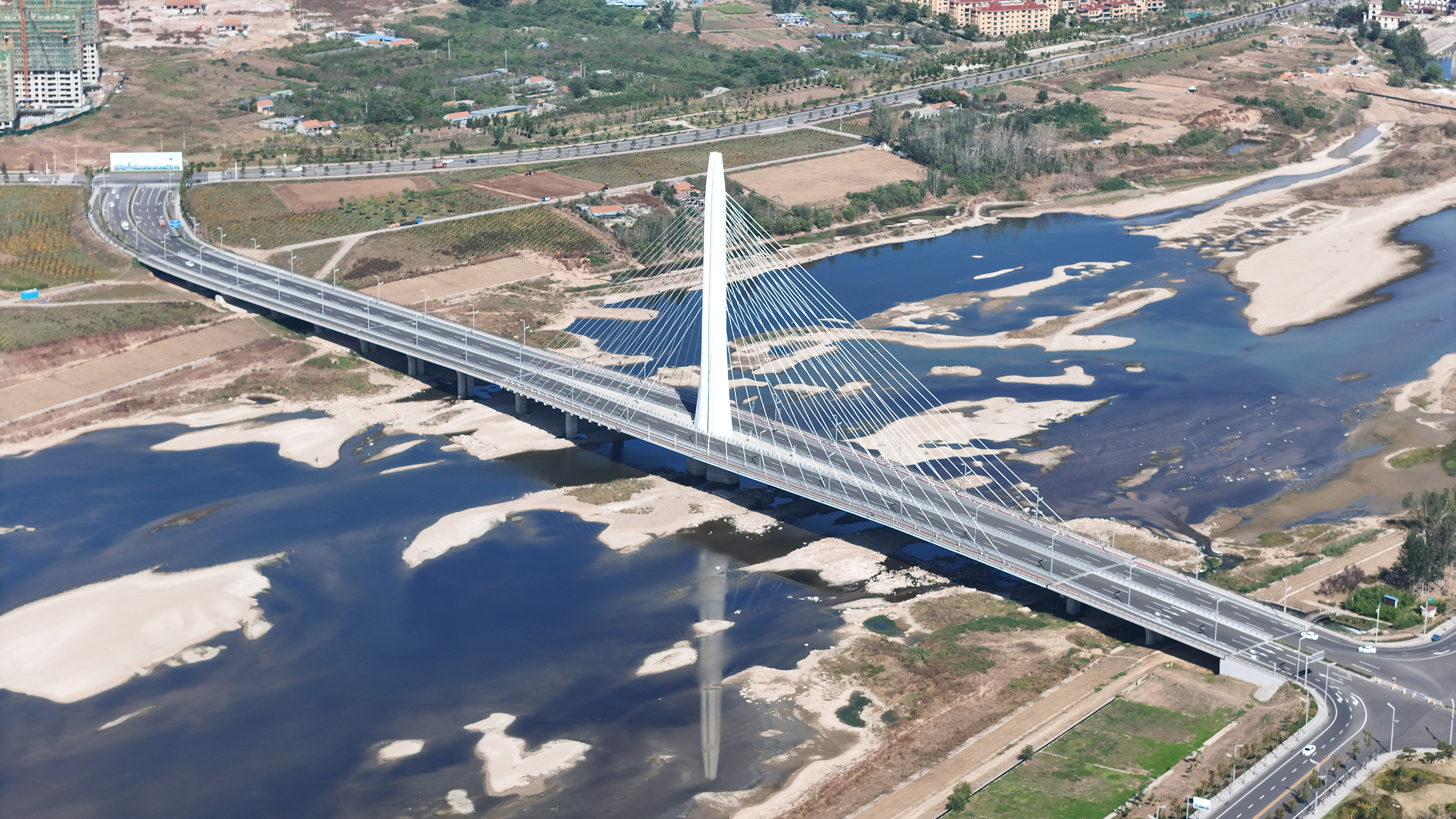
Yi River in Yishui County

Yi River (Chinese: 沂河), historically known as Yi Shui (Chinese: 沂水), is a major river within the Huai River Basin and part of the Yi–Shu–Si River System. It originates from Mount Lu in Yiyuan County, Zibo City, Shandong Province, and flows into Luoma Lake in Suqian City, Jiangsu Province. The river has a total length of 333 kilometers.

The source of the Yi River is the Dazhangzhuang River (大张庄河), which rises in the mountainous area of Mount Lu in Yiyuan County, Zibo City, Shandong Province. Below the Tianzhuang Reservoir (田庄水库), it is called the Yi River. It first flows north through the urban area of Yiyuan County, then turns south, passing through Yishui, Yinan, Hedong, Lanshan, Luozhuang, Tancheng, and Lanling in Linyi City, then continues into Pizhou and Xinyi in Xuzhou City, Jiangsu Province, before entering Luoma Lake in Suqian City.

The total length of the river is 333 kilometers, of which 287.5 kilometers are within Shandong Province and 45.5 kilometers within Jiangsu Province.
