= Boshan, Zibo =

Boshan District 博山区
- District
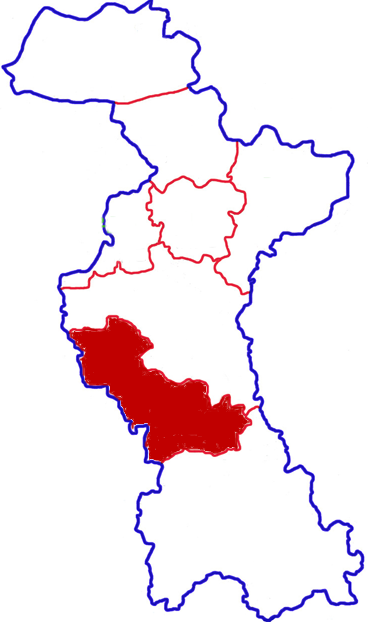
- Location in Zibo

- Location in Shandong
- Coordinates: 36°29′39″N 117°51′48″E
- Country: People's Republic of China
- Province: Shandong
- Prefecture-level city: Zibo

Area
  - Total: 698.2 km^{2} (269.6 sq mi)

Population (2018)
  - Total: 442,252
  - Density: 633.4/km^{2} (1,641/sq mi)
- Time zone: UTC+8 (China Standard)
- Postal code: 255200
- Area code: +86 0533
- Website: www.boshan.gov.cn

Boshan (Chinese: 博山; pinyin: Bóshān) is the southernmost district of the city of Zibo, in central Shandong province, China.

== Description ==
Boshan is a district in southern Zibo City with a population of around 4406,200 people(As of the end of 2023). It is 42 kilometers south of the urban center of Zibo City: Zhang Dian.

Downtown Boshan has a wide central avenue which is divided by a park-like river with walkways, stone bridges and gazebos. A modern expressway bypassed the downtown area, and that has attracted development to the outskirts of the city.

Boshan's major industries are ceramics, industrial pumps, vacuum pumps, chemicals and pharmaceuticals. They advertise themselves as being the Pump Capital of China.

== History ==
In the early 20th century, Boshan was the administrative capital of the area. But Boshan is in the mountains while Zhang Dian is in a flat valley. Zhang Dian is on a main rail corridor, while Boshan was just a spur. So Zhang Dian replaced Boshan as a commercial and administrative center.

Eastern shandong was a German protectorate in the early 20th century, and in Boshan you can see traces of German influence. Some of the major non-Chinese companies in town are German. Siemens was one of the largest companies in town, but that German company sold their Boshan factory to Gardner Denver Nash in 2005. The train station looks like a Bavarian building. And the town still has a few small restaurants who brew their own beer, German style.

Around the beginning of the 21st century, new tall buildings were erected and old-styled-one-story houses pulled down.

As the reform of economic system was enforced further in Boshan, many traditional factories which once benefited much from the national policies' protection shut down with many workers losing their jobs. Recently, Boshan's government has been trying to promote the local tourist industry.

== Administrative divisions ==
As of 2023, this District is divided to 3 subdistricts and 7 towns.

Subdistricts

- Chengdong Subdistrict (城东街道)
- Chengxi Subdistrict (城西街道)
- Shantou Subdistrict (山头街道)

Towns

- Yucheng (域城镇)
- Baita (白塔镇)
- Badou (八陡镇)
- Shima (石马镇)
- Yuanquan (源泉镇)
- Boshan (博山镇)

== Climate ==
Boshan District is located in the warm temperate monsoon zone, a semi-humid climate, with an average annual temperature of 13.6 °C, a frost-free period of 201 days, and an average annual precipitation of 719.3 mm. The four seasons are distinct, with dry and little rain in spring, often with drought and frost; high temperature and rain in summer, with more thunderstorms and gusty winds; a gradual drop in temperature in autumn, with less rain and sunny weather; and a dry and cold winter with little rain and more north winds. Winter and summer are long, but spring and autumn are short, with winter being the longest at 140 days, summer the next longest at 100 days, and spring the shortest at 60 days. The overall climate is characterised by a pronounced monsoon and uneven distribution of temperature and precipitation, which affects local agricultural production and life.

Climate data for Boshan, elevation 190 m (620 ft), (1991–2020 normals, extremes 1981–2010)
Month	Jan	Feb	Mar	Apr	May	Jun	Jul	Aug	Sep	Oct	Nov	Dec	Year
Record high °C (°F)	17.8 (64.0)	24.6 (76.3)	29.7 (85.5)	33.1 (91.6)	37.4 (99.3)	38.8 (101.8)	39.0 (102.2)	36.0 (96.8)	35.8 (96.4)	35.3 (95.5)	25.1 (77.2)	19.3 (66.7)	39.0 (102.2)
Mean daily maximum °C (°F)	3.6 (38.5)	7.4 (45.3)	13.8 (56.8)	20.9 (69.6)	26.6 (79.9)	30.7 (87.3)	31.4 (88.5)	30.1 (86.2)	26.5 (79.7)	20.6 (69.1)	12.5 (54.5)	5.6 (42.1)	19.1 (66.5)
Daily mean °C (°F)	−1.2 (29.8)	2.1 (35.8)	8.2 (46.8)	15.2 (59.4)	21.2 (70.2)	25.4 (77.7)	27.0 (80.6)	25.5 (77.9)	21.2 (70.2)	15.1 (59.2)	7.6 (45.7)	0.9 (33.6)	14.0 (57.2)
Mean daily minimum °C (°F)	−4.9 (23.2)	−2.0 (28.4)	3.5 (38.3)	10.1 (50.2)	15.9 (60.6)	20.6 (69.1)	23.1 (73.6)	21.8 (71.2)	17.0 (62.6)	10.7 (51.3)	3.5 (38.3)	−2.8 (27.0)	9.7 (49.5)
Record low °C (°F)	−18.0 (−0.4)	−14.5 (5.9)	−9.2 (15.4)	−2.7 (27.1)	3.7 (38.7)	9.6 (49.3)	15.7 (60.3)	12.7 (54.9)	6.4 (43.5)	−1.9 (28.6)	−13.2 (8.2)	−19.3 (−2.7)	−19.3 (−2.7)
Average precipitation mm (inches)	7.0 (0.28)	13.8 (0.54)	15.5 (0.61)	35.1 (1.38)	56.7 (2.23)	99.3 (3.91)	193.1 (7.60)	195.1 (7.68)	77.5 (3.05)	34.0 (1.34)	32.8 (1.29)	11.2 (0.44)	771.1 (30.35)
Average precipitation days (≥ 0.1 mm)	3.0	3.5	4.1	5.9	7.5	8.8	13.3	13.4	7.4	5.8	5.0	3.9	81.6
Average snowy days	4.6	3.7	1.9	0.2	0	0	0	0	0	0	1.2	3.6	15.2
Average relative humidity (%)	55	52	47	48	52	57	73	77	68	60	59	57	59
Mean monthly sunshine hours	141.3	147.8	193.7	215.4	238.7	202.2	169.1	169.2	175.0	175.6	147.7	142.0	2,117.7
Percentage possible sunshine	46	48	52	55	55	46	38	41	48	51	49	47	48
Source: China Meteorological Administration

== Tourism ==
Attractions

Yuan Shan National Park is a mountain top park located in the center of Boshan.

The park features a reconstructed section of the Great Wall of Qi. Near the Great Wall is an ocean of stones, strangely shaped limestones which used to be part of the ocean floor. Because of these stones, Taoists put a temple on the mountain, and the park still has an old Taoist temple. Recently, a huge statue of Jiang Ziya (an important character in the legend stories of ancient China) has been erected at the North Gate of Yuan Shan National Park.

Boshan food is slightly different from other parts of China. Boshan people do not eat hot peppery food. They tend to prefer sour or salty dishes. Some of the local dishes do have a lot of white pepper, a Chinese version of black pepper. The most common kind of restaurants in Boshan are hot pot restaurants, a Chinese stew fondue. Also, there are many seafood restaurants, as well as restaurants which specialize in Boshan food.

One favorite local dish is Pickled Vegetable Fish Soup. It is a stew made from fish and pickled Chinese cabbage, with a variety of other vegetables thrown in.

Boshan is surrounded by mountains, and when the weather is warm, these mountains have many small outdoor restaurants located alongside mountain streams. Tourists hike the mountains and, as they follow the streams, they have a selection of these small restaurants. Dishes include range chickens (not commercially raised), fish, and sometimes locusts or scorpions from the forests. Meals are served on small stone tables located under gazebos alongside the stream.

== See also ==
- List of administrative divisions of Shandong
