= Hedong, Linyi =

Hedong 河东区
- District
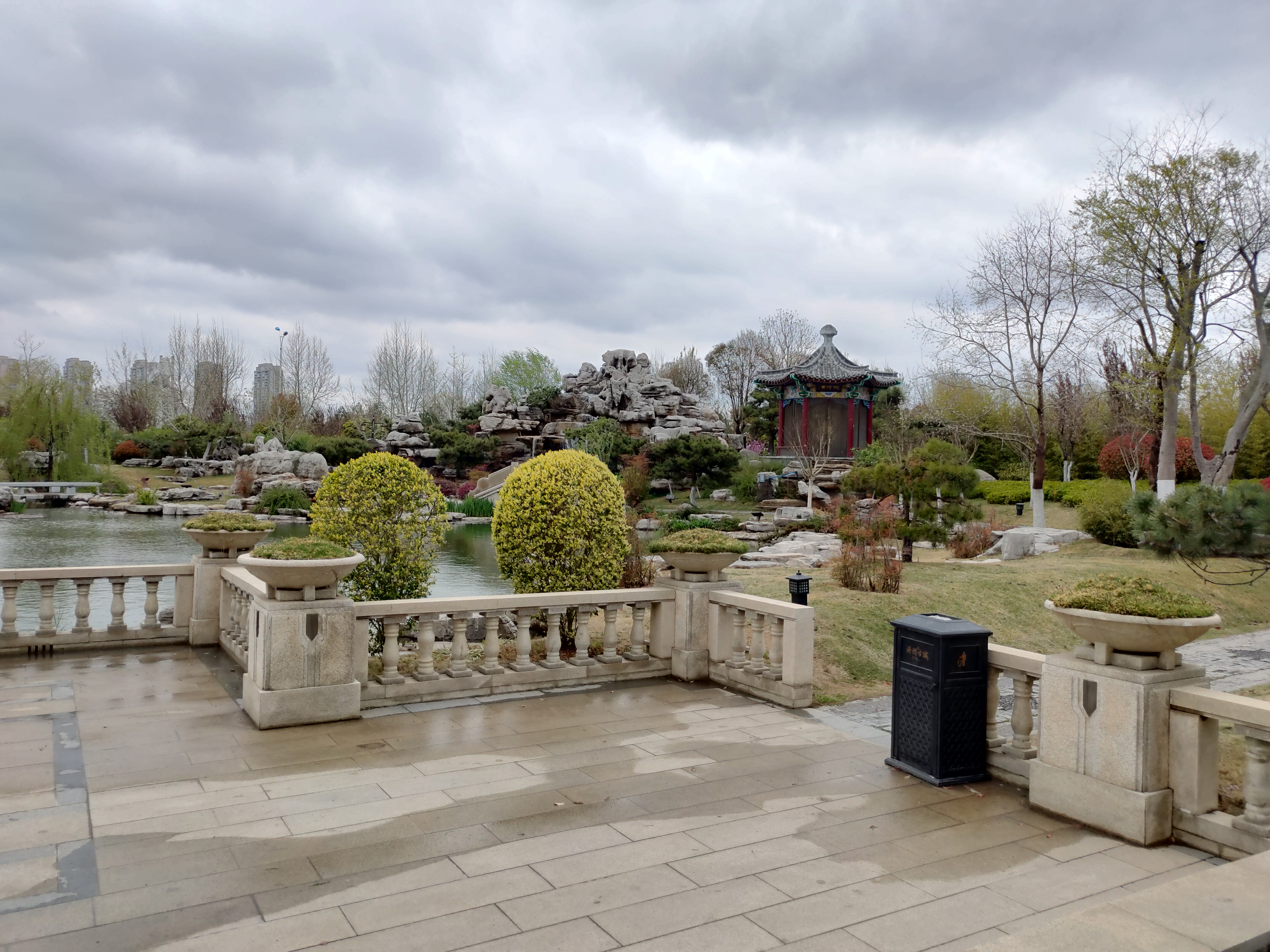
- Yizhou Ancient Town

- Location in Shandong
- Coordinates: 35°05′24″N 118°24′10″E
- Country: People's Republic of China
- Province: Shandong
- Prefecture-level city: Linyi

Area
  - Total: 834 km^{2} (322 sq mi)

Population (2019)
  - Total: 545,000
  - Density: 653/km^{2} (1,690/sq mi)
- Time zone: UTC+8 (China Standard)
- Postal code: 572099

Hedong (simplified Chinese: 河东区; traditional Chinese: 河東區; pinyin: Hédōng Qū; lit. 'river east') is an urban district of the city of Linyi, Shandong province, China. It has an area of 727.63 km^{2} (280.94 sq mi) and around 600,000 inhabitants (2003). As the name implies, it is located east of the Yi River from the other two districts of Linyi, Lanshan, and Luozhuang.

== Administrative divisions ==
As of 2012, this district is divided to 7 subdistricts, 4 towns and 1 township.

Subdistricts

- Jiuqu Subdistrict (九曲街道)
- Zhimadun Subdistrict (芝麻墩街道)
- Meibu Subdistrict (梅埠街道)
- Xiangsong Subdistrict (相公街道)
- Taiping Subdistrict (太平街道)
- Tangtou Subdistrict (汤头街道)
- Fenghuangling Subdistrict (凤凰岭街道)

Towns

- Chonggou (重沟镇)
- Tanghe (汤河镇)
- Bahu (八湖镇)
- Zhengwang (郑旺镇)

Townships

- Liudianzi Township (刘店子乡)
