= Linyi =

Prefecture-level city in Shandong, China

Linyi 临沂市 Lini
- Prefecture-level city
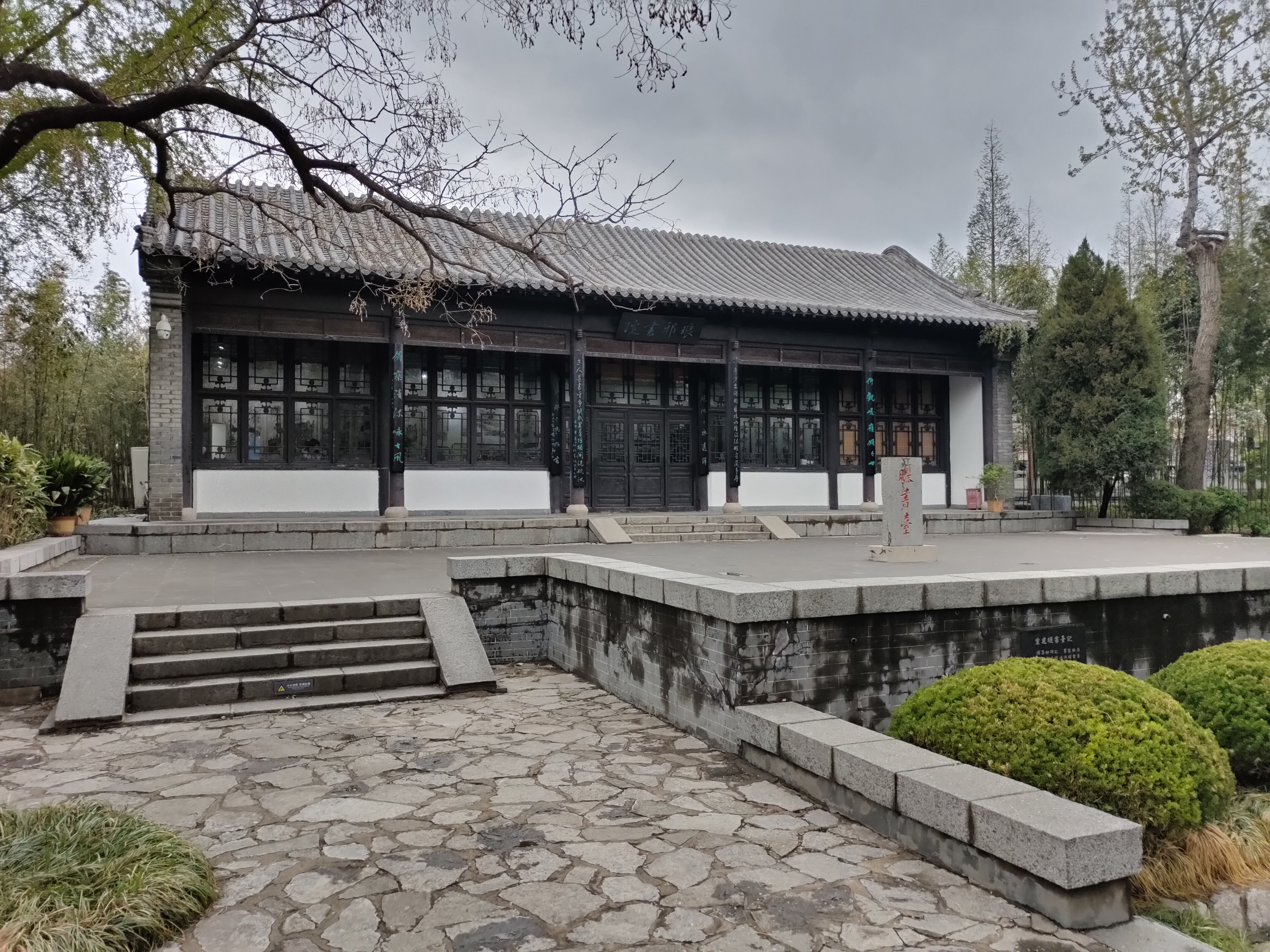
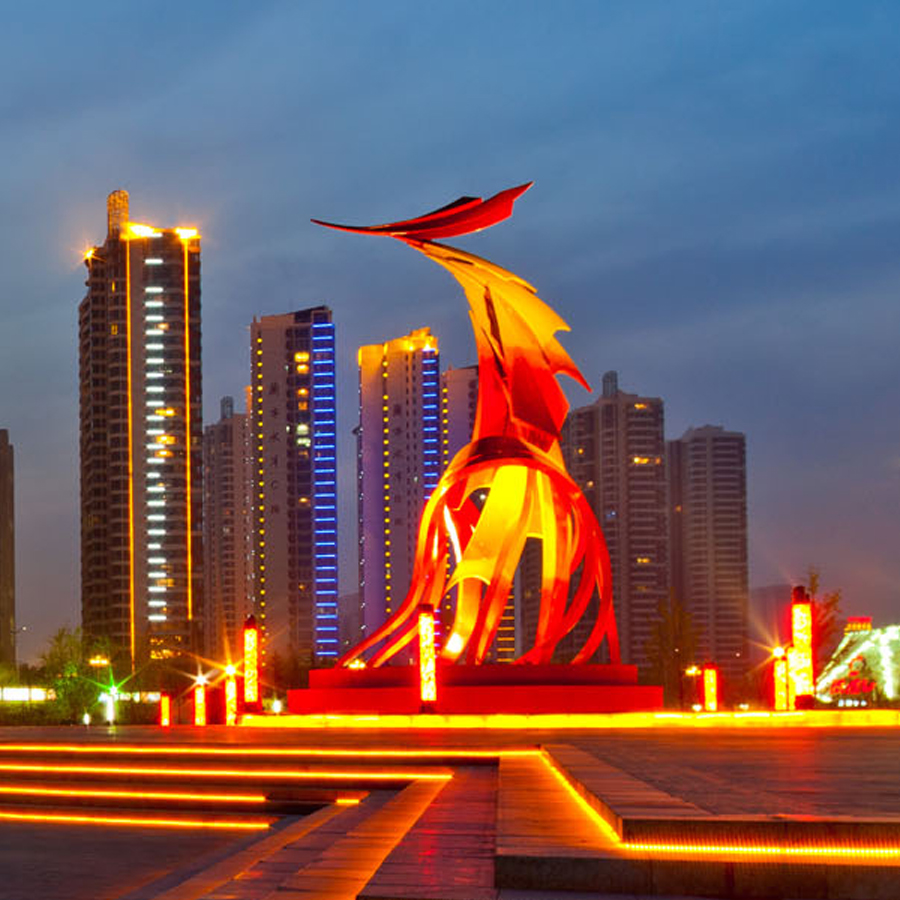
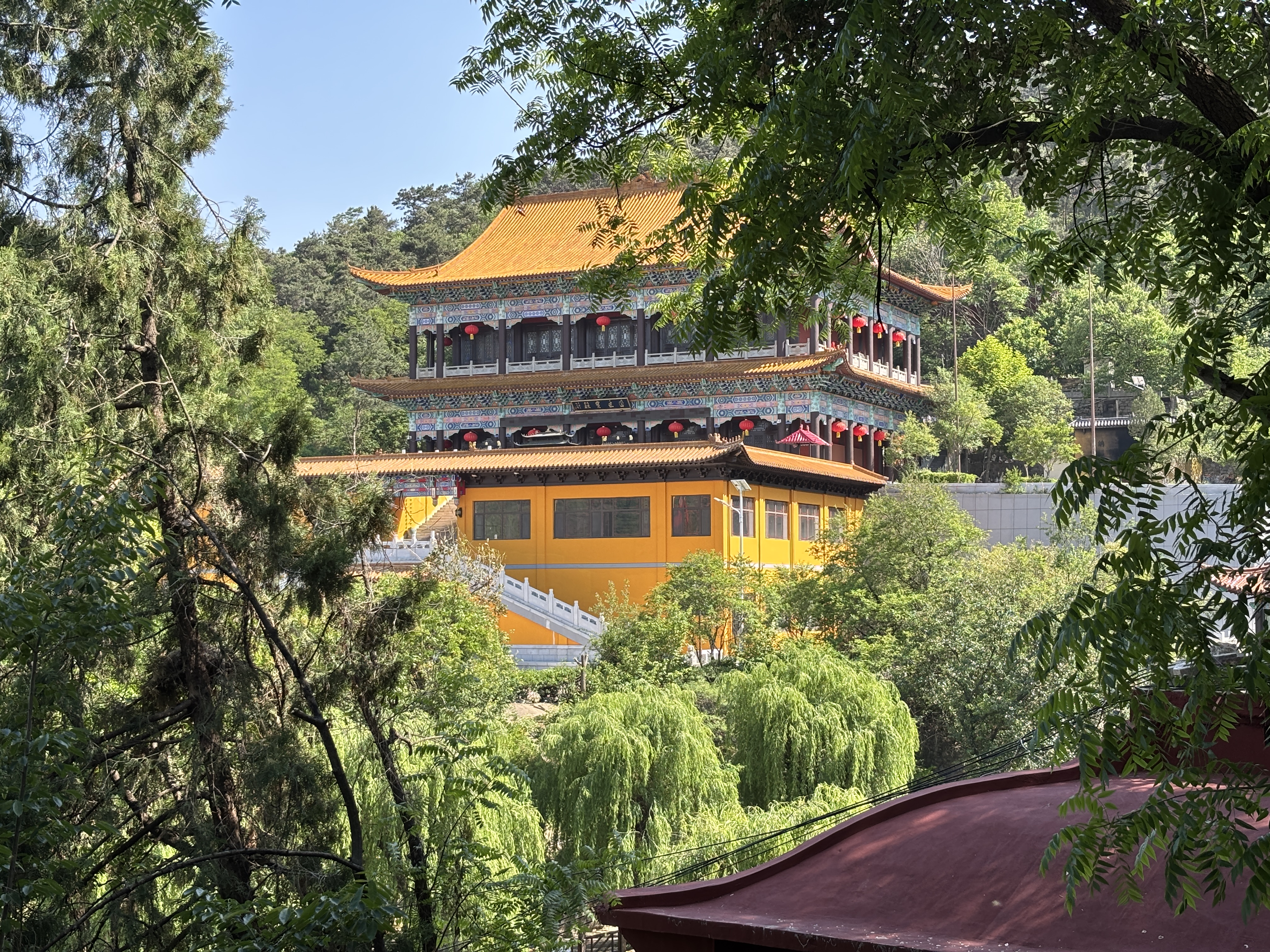
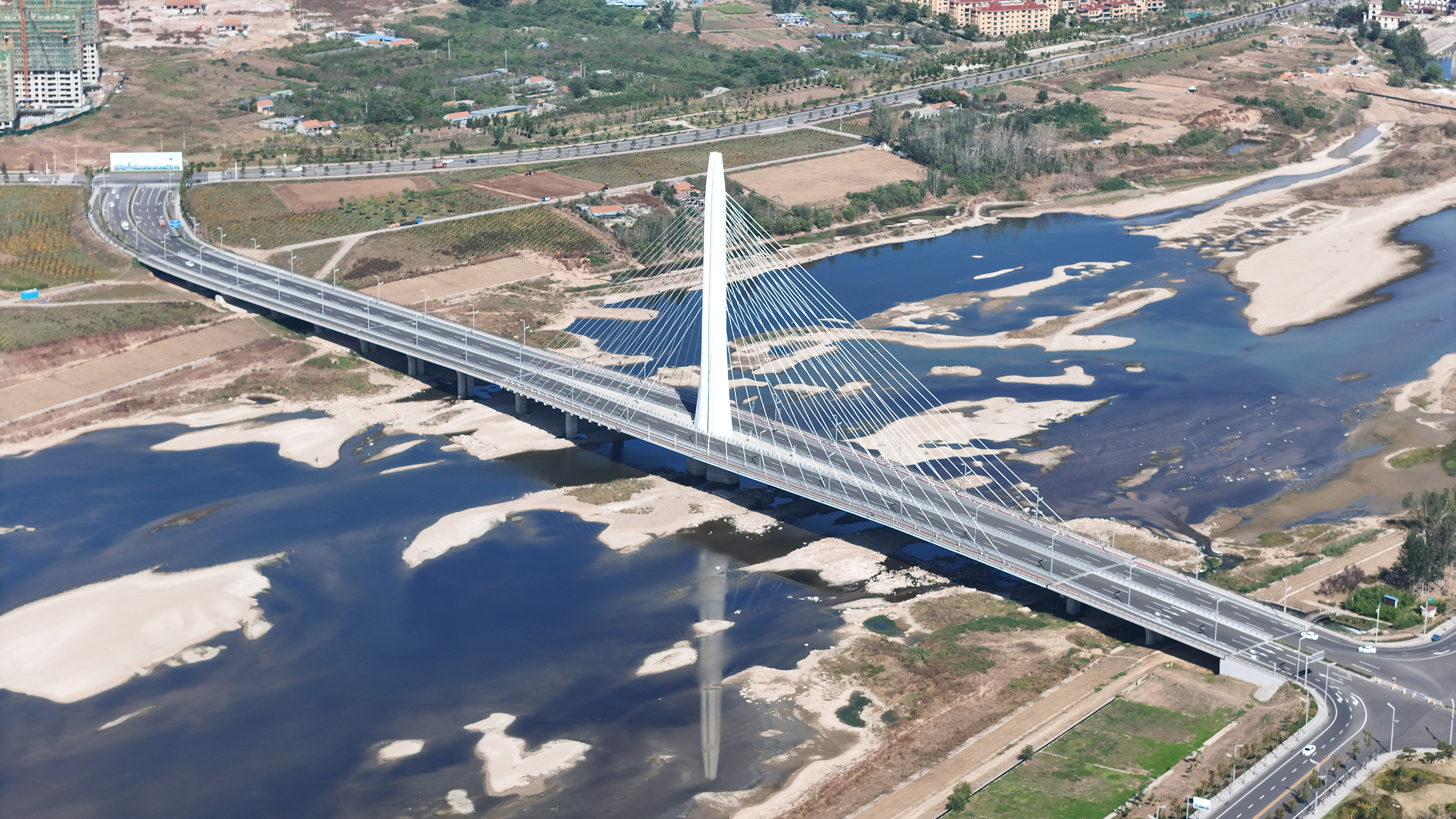
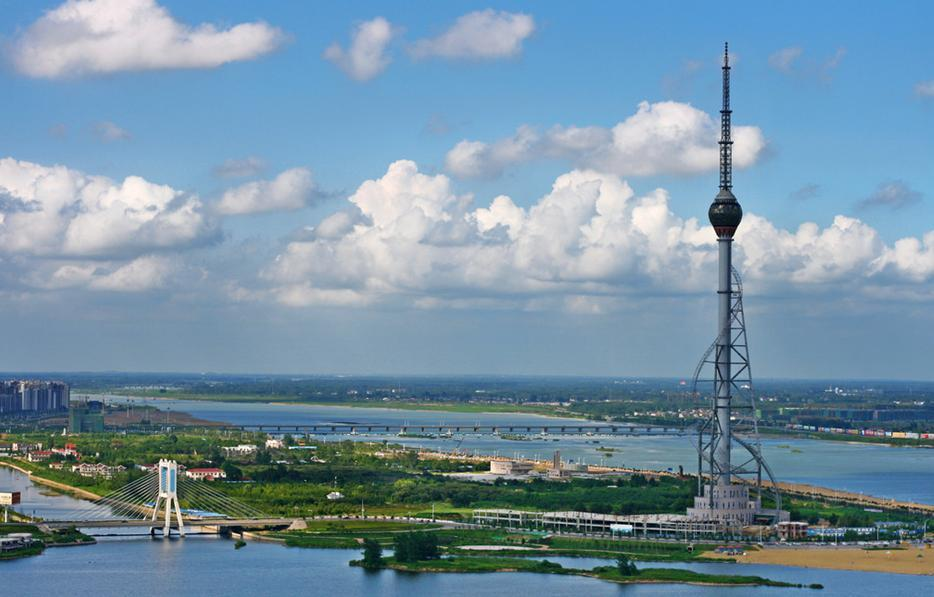
- Memorial of Wang Xizhi Fenghuang Square Yizhou Ancient City Longxing temple, Yishui Bridge over Yi River Linyi television tower

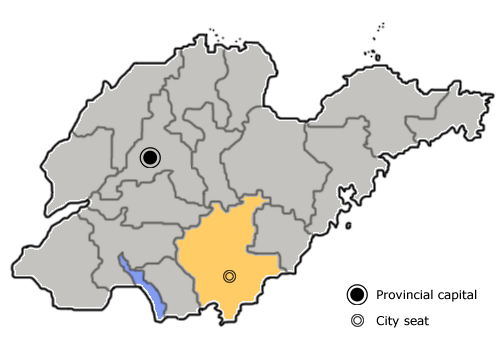
- Location of Linyi City jurisdiction in Shandong
- Interactive map of Linyi
- Coordinates (Linyi municipal government): 35°06′14″N 118°21′23″E
- Country: People's Republic of China
- Province: Shandong
- County-level divisions: 12
- Township-level divisions: 181
- Municipal seat: Lanshan District

Government
  - CPC Secretary: Ren Gang (任刚)
  - Mayor: Zhang Baoliang (张宝亮)

Area
  - Prefecture-level city: 17,192 km^{2} (6,638 sq mi)
  - Urban: 2,293.3 km^{2} (885.4 sq mi)
  - Metro: 2,293.3 km^{2} (885.4 sq mi)
- Elevation: 74 m (243 ft)

Population (2020 census)
  - Prefecture-level city: 11,018,365
  - Density: 640.90/km^{2} (1,659.9/sq mi)
  - Urban: 3,651,868
  - Urban density: 1,592.4/km^{2} (4,124.3/sq mi)
  - Metro: 3,651,868
  - Metro density: 1,592.4/km^{2} (4,124.3/sq mi)

GDP
  - Prefecture-level city: CN¥ 472 billion US$ 71.3 billion
  - Per capita: CN¥ 44,534; US$ 6,730
- Time zone: UTC+8 (China Standard)
- Postal code: 276000
- Area code: 0539
- ISO 3166 code: CN-SD-13
- License Plate Prefix: 鲁Q, 鲁W
- Administrative division code: 371300

Línyí
- Simplified Chinese: 临沂
- Traditional Chinese: 臨沂
- Literal meaning: close to the Yi River
Transcriptions
Standard Mandarin
- Hanyu Pinyin: Línyí
- Bopomofo: ㄌㄧㄣˊ ㄧˊ
- Gwoyeu Romatzyh: Linyi
- Wade–Giles: Lin^{2}-i^{2}

Linyi (simplified Chinese: 临沂; traditional Chinese: 臨沂; pinyin: Línyí) is a prefecture-level city in the south of Shandong province, China. As of 2011, Linyi is the largest prefecture-level city in Shandong, both by area and population, Linyi borders Rizhao to the east, Weifang to the northeast, Zibo to the north, Tai'an to the northwest, Jining to the west, Zaozhuang to the southwest, and the province of Jiangsu to the south. The name of the city Linyi (临沂) literally means "close to the Yi River".

Linyi City, referred to as Yi, the ancient name of Langya, Yizhou. It is located in the transition zone between Shandong hilly Yimeng Mountain area and Yishu River alluvial plain, and the terrain is high in the north and low in the south. The three major mountain ranges of Yishan, Mengshan and Nishan are distributed in the north, with hills in the center and plains in the south. The Yi, Shu, and Si Rivers all originate from the Yimeng Mountains and flow into the East China Sea. The municipal government is located at No.17 Beijing Road, Lanshan District. Linyi is one of the third batch of National Civilized Cities, China's Outstanding Tourist Cities, China's Garden Cities, China's Hygienic Cities, China's Model Environmental Protection Cities and National Forest Cities.

The city recently expanded along the Yi River to Nanfang, now called the Beicheng New Area, under the slogan "Grand Linyi, Beautiful Linyi, New Linyi". Multiple recreational parks were built, along with new school campuses etc. The development is an achievement of a series of governmental projects, including relocating the city government, which is expected to stimulate the economy.

The population was 11,018,365 at the 2010 Chinese census, The population was 10,993,100 at the 2020 Chinese census, of which 3,651,868 lived in the built-up area made up of Lanshan District, Luozhuang District and Hedong District, as well as Linyi National Hi-Tech Zone.

According to the (China) Shandong Provincial Seventh National Population Census Bulletin - Hongheiku Statistical Bulletin Database (hongheiku. com), the permanent population of Linyi City is 11,018,365, with 51.14% males and 48.86% females. The age structure of 0–14 years old accounts for 23.46%, 15–59 years old accounts for 56.91%, over 60 years old accounts for 19.63%, and over 65 years old accounts for 14.12%, respectively.

== Administration ==
The prefecture-level city of Linyi administers 12 county-level divisions, including three districts and nine counties.

Map
Subdivision	Chinese	Pinyin
Lanshan District	兰山区	Lánshān Qū
Luozhuang District	罗庄区	Luózhuāng Qū
Hedong District	河东区	Hédōng Qū
Yinan County	沂南县	Yínán Xiàn
Tancheng County	郯城县	Tánchéng Xiàn
Yishui County	沂水县	Yíshuǐ Xiàn
Lanling County	兰陵县	Lánlíng Xiàn
Fei County	费县	Fèixiàn
Pingyi County	平邑县	Píngyì Xiàn
Junan County	莒南县	Jǔnán Xiàn
Mengyin County	蒙阴县	Méngyīn Xiàn
Linshu County	临沭县	Línshù Xiàn

== History ==
Linyi has a history of 2,400 years and is home to many historical figures, notably Zhuge Liang and Wang Xizhi. In 1972, the Sun Tzu's Art of War was first discovered here, along with other classics on hand written bamboo slips. Sun Tzu's Art of War is currently in display at Shandong Provincial museum.

On July 25, 1668, an earthquake that had an estimated magnitude of M_{s} 8.5, occurred just northeast of Linyi, making it the largest historical earthquake in Eastern China, and one of the largest in the world on land. In Linyi, no house was left standing, and black water was said to emerge from ground fissures that opened up after the earthquake.

In the spring of 1938, during the Second Sino-Japanese War, the city was the scene of fierce fighting between Chinese and Japanese troops. The civilians were encouraged by army victory in the Battle of Tai'erzhuang, which was nearby, defended Linyi fiercely, but Japanese soldiers breached the citywalls on April 19, 1938. The defenders withdrew the next day to another contested area 49 kilometers away.

In 1946, during the Chinese Civil War, the CPC Directorate General of Shandong Wartime Posts was moved from the Yimeng Mountains to Linyi and renamed the Shandong Provincial Postal Administration.

== Modern developments ==
After the People's Republic of China was founded in October 1949, the administrative division was adjusted.

In 2005, Linyi drew international attention as a center of human rights abuses related to the enforcement of China's controversial family planning policies. Following widespread allegations of violence and coercion in excess of Chinese law, local human rights defender Chen Guangcheng filed a class action lawsuit on behalf of the victims. The local Chinese courts refused to hear the case and imprisoned Chen Guangcheng on charges of fomenting state resistance. Due in part to the severity and scope of these abuses Linyi has been used by activists to criticize China's violation of women's rights.

== Geography ==
Linyi is in the south of Shandong province, not far from the ports of Rizhao, Lanshan District, Rizhao and Lianyungang. It is along the G2 Beijing–Shanghai Expressway as well as the Eurasian Land Bridge. The urban area lies on mostly flat land that gives way to more rugged terrain in the west and northwest of the city's administrative area, which covers 17,184 km^{2} (6,635 sq mi).

=== Climate ===
Linyi has a monsoon-influenced climate with generous summer precipitation, cold, dry winters, and hot, humid summers. Under the Köppen climate classification, it is in the transition from the humid subtropical zone (Cwa) to the humid continental zone (Dwa), though favouring the former. It has the characteristics of suitable climate, distinct four seasons, sufficient sunshine, abundant rainfall, and long frost-free period. More than half of the annual precipitation of 833 mm (32.8 in) falls in July and August alone, and the frost-free period is above 200 days.

Climate data for Linyi, elevation 124 m (407 ft), (1991–2020 normals, extremes 1971–present)
Month	Jan	Feb	Mar	Apr	May	Jun	Jul	Aug	Sep	Oct	Nov	Dec	Year
Record high °C (°F)	16.8 (62.2)	24.0 (75.2)	31.9 (89.4)	33.0 (91.4)	38.0 (100.4)	38.1 (100.6)	41.6 (106.9)	36.5 (97.7)	35.8 (96.4)	33.8 (92.8)	26.9 (80.4)	19.7 (67.5)	41.6 (106.9)
Mean daily maximum °C (°F)	4.8 (40.6)	8.1 (46.6)	13.9 (57.0)	20.7 (69.3)	26.1 (79.0)	29.7 (85.5)	31.0 (87.8)	30.2 (86.4)	26.8 (80.2)	21.3 (70.3)	13.6 (56.5)	6.8 (44.2)	19.4 (67.0)
Daily mean °C (°F)	−0.2 (31.6)	2.6 (36.7)	8.0 (46.4)	14.6 (58.3)	20.4 (68.7)	24.3 (75.7)	26.7 (80.1)	25.9 (78.6)	21.7 (71.1)	15.8 (60.4)	8.4 (47.1)	1.9 (35.4)	14.2 (57.5)
Mean daily minimum °C (°F)	−4.1 (24.6)	−1.6 (29.1)	3.0 (37.4)	9.3 (48.7)	15.1 (59.2)	19.7 (67.5)	23.3 (73.9)	22.7 (72.9)	17.7 (63.9)	11.3 (52.3)	4.1 (39.4)	−2.0 (28.4)	9.9 (49.8)
Record low °C (°F)	−13.3 (8.1)	−14.3 (6.3)	−8.4 (16.9)	−2.7 (27.1)	5.6 (42.1)	12.0 (53.6)	15.3 (59.5)	12.6 (54.7)	7.1 (44.8)	−0.2 (31.6)	−7.6 (18.3)	−13.1 (8.4)	−14.3 (6.3)
Average precipitation mm (inches)	11.9 (0.47)	16.3 (0.64)	23.6 (0.93)	36.5 (1.44)	76.9 (3.03)	85.8 (3.38)	241.4 (9.50)	239.0 (9.41)	70.8 (2.79)	33.0 (1.30)	32.4 (1.28)	14.1 (0.56)	881.7 (34.73)
Average precipitation days (≥ 0.1 mm)	3.6	4.6	4.9	5.9	7.0	7.9	13.0	12.4	7.1	5.6	5.2	3.6	80.8
Average snowy days	3.2	3.0	1.4	0.1	0	0	0	0	0	0	0.7	1.8	10.2
Average relative humidity (%)	61	60	57	58	63	69	81	81	74	67	66	63	67
Mean monthly sunshine hours	154.4	155.8	197.6	218.2	234.9	199.1	175.6	181.4	182.2	186.3	158.9	156.5	2,200.9
Percentage possible sunshine	49	50	53	55	54	46	40	44	50	54	52	52	50
Source 1: China Meteorological Administration
Source 2: Weather China

== Economy ==
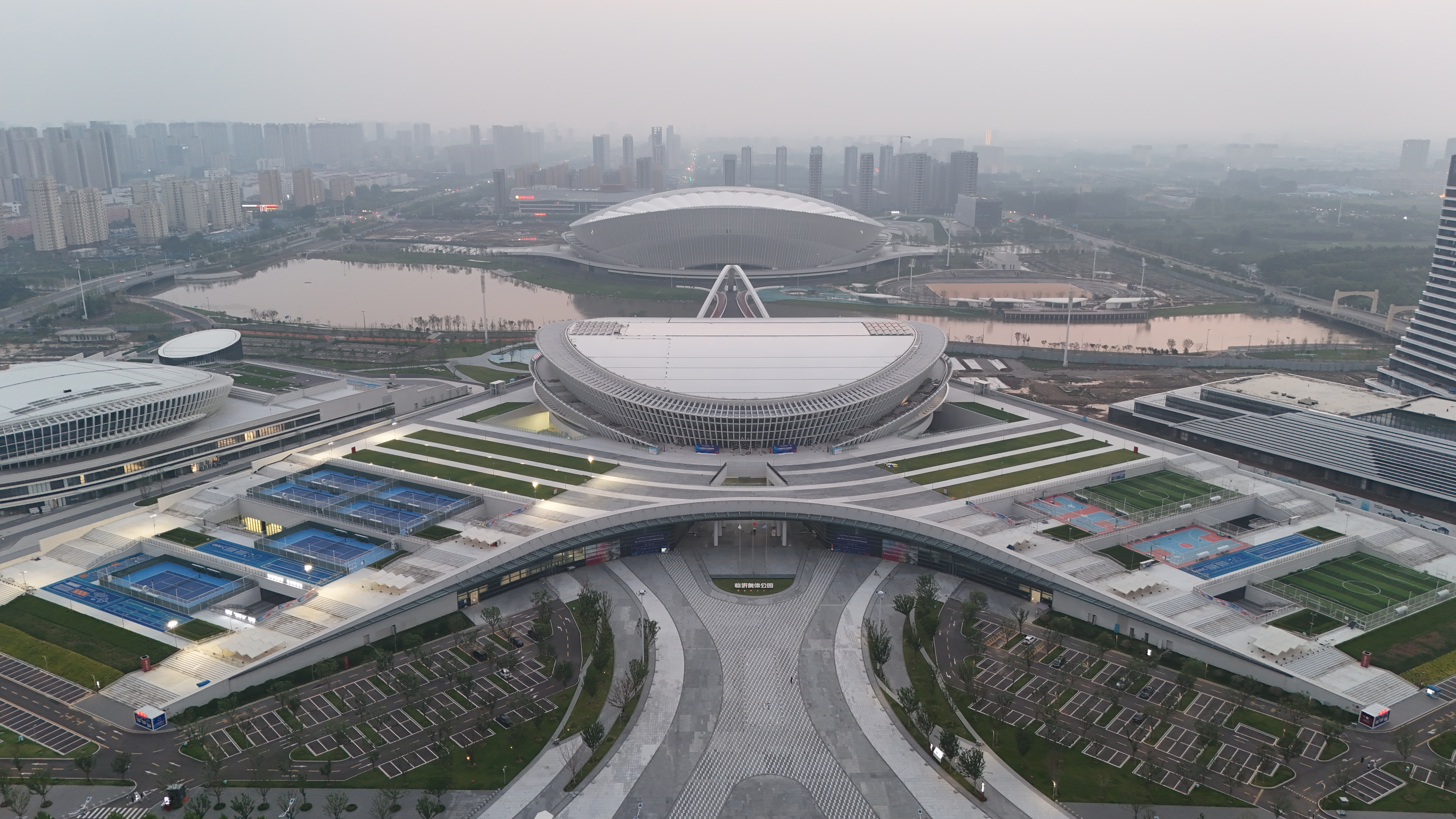
Linyi Olympic Sports Park

After the reform and opening up, Linyi's economy entered a stage of rapid development, with its GDP surpassing the 5 billion yuan and 10 billion yuan thresholds in 1987 and 1991, respectively. Although Rizhao, Yiyuan, and Juxian counties and cities were successively separated (with a zoning area of about 5600 square kilometers), they still crossed six steps of 100 billion yuan, 200 billion yuan, 300 billion yuan, 400 billion yuan, 500 billion yuan, and 600 billion yuan in 2004, 2009, 2012, 2016, 2021, and 2023, respectively. The total volume has increased by more than eight times in 45 years. In 2023, the GDP of Linyi will reach 610.5 billion yuan, which is 3591 times that of 1949, and the total economic output will jump to the fifth place in the province.

Linyi's economy is based around its wholesale markets. The Linyi Wholesale City is ranked 3rd in its category in China with an annual trade volume of 40 billion RMB (~US$5 billion). The Linyi prefecture has developed more than 1,500 specialized villages, over 80 specialized towns and nearly 800 industrialized agricultural enterprises.

In 2014 the prefecture's GDP was 369 billion RMB. Main industrial products are as follows: textiles, foodstuffs, machinery, electronics, chemicals, building materials, coal, medicines, gold and porcelain. Machinery is exported to Europe, the Americas and south-east Asia. Linyi prefecture has an annual capacity of three million tons of compound fertilizers.

The city is served by Linyi Qiyang Airport.

== Local food ==
- Linyi Pancake (临沂煎饼) Linyi pancakes are as thin as paper, fragrant and delicious.
- Mengshan Roasted whole lamb Before grilling, goats need to be marinated with dozens of Chinese herbs and seasonings to enhance their flavor. This way, the roasted lamb is crispy on the outside and tender on the inside, and the taste is not greasy. Everyone who has tasted it has praised it endlessly.
- Linyi Grain Soup (临沂糁汤) Grain soup is one of the traditional famous dishes in Linyi, Shandong Province. It is made by refining beef, wheat kernels, flour, scallions, ginger, pepper and other raw materials through multiple processes, and has the characteristic of fresh and salty taste.

== Transport ==
The city has an international airport, Linyi Qiyang International Airport.

There is also the planned Linyi Metro. The urban rail transit network planned for Linyi City in 2030 consists of 5 lines, with a total length of approximately 166.6 kilometers and 138 stations, including 14 transfer stations, with an average distance of 1.2 kilometers between stations.

== Notable people ==
- Xunzi (312–230 BCE), philosopher
- Wang Xiang (185–269), Eastern Han Dynasty politician, famous for his fillial piety
- Wang Xizhi (303–361), Eastern Jin Dynasty calligrapher
- Zhuge Liang (181–234), statesman and strategist
- He Chengtian (370–447), astronomer, calendarist and mathematician
- Gui Guzi, military strategist, teacher of renowned Warring States generals Sun Bin and Pang Juan
- Zuo Baogui (1837–1894), general of the Qing Dynasty
- Xue Qikun (1963), physicist specializing in condensed matter physics

== Population and residence ==
=== Demographics ===
According to the seventh national census in 2020, the city's resident population was 11,018,400, accounting for 10.85% of the province's population, ranking first in the province. The sex ratio of the population is 104.66%, and the proportion of elderly people aged 65 and above is 14.12%. Compared with the Sixth National Census, there was an increase of 979,000 people in ten years, an increase of 9.75%, with an average annual growth rate of 0.93%, which is higher than that of the whole province and the whole country by 0.4 and 0.35 percentage points, respectively. There are 3.9 million family households and 10.666 million people living in the city. The city's resident population in the municipal districts was 3.652 million, accounting for 33.14% of the city's resident population, an increase of 5.8 percentage points from 2010, while the resident population in the nine counties was 7.366 million, accounting for 66.86% of the city's resident population. The male population was 5.634 million, accounting for 51.14%; the female population was 5.384 million, accounting for 48.86%. The sex ratio of the population was 104.66, 0.41 percentage points lower than that of the whole country, and 1.28 percentage points higher than that of 2010. 2.585 million people, or 23.46%, were aged 0–14; 6.27 million, or 56.91%, were aged 15–59; and 2.163 million, or 19.63%, were aged 60 and above, with 1.555 million, or 14.6%, being aged 65 and above. The population aged 65 and above was 1.555 million, accounting for 14.12%. Compared with 2010, the proportion of the population aged 0–14 years rose by 5.33 percentage points, 5.51 and 4.68 percentage points above the national and provincial averages, while the proportion of the population aged 15–59 years fell by 10.61 percentage points.

=== Ethnic groups ===
There are 53 ethnic groups in Linyi, mainly Han Chinese, with 10,608,800 people, accounting for 99.45% of the resident population; 52 ethnic minorities, with a population of 58,300 people, accounting for 0.55% of the resident population, with the Hui ethnic group being the most numerous, with 46,800 people, accounting for 0.44% of the resident population, and other ethnic minorities, with 11,500 people, accounting for 0.11% of the resident population.

== Medical care ==
As of 2022, there are 5 more well-known hospitals in Linyi.

- Linyi People's Hospital (Linyi First People's Hospital): Formerly known as the American Church Hospital, it was founded in 1891. It is one of the first three provincial-level regional medical centers in Shandong Province, as well as the Fifth Affiliated Hospital of Shandong University, the Affiliated Hospital of Xuzhou Medical University, the National Postdoctoral Research Station, the National Standardized Training Base for Residents, the National Advanced Stroke Prevention and Treatment Base, and the National Training Base for Clinical Pharmacists.
- Linyi City Hospital of Traditional Chinese Medicine: Located at No.211 Jiefang Road, Lanshan District, Linyi City, Shandong Province, Linyi City Hospital of Traditional Chinese Medicine (TCMH) was founded in 1976, covering an area of 78 acres, with a total construction area of 133,000 square meters, it is a Chinese tertiary TCM hospital integrating medical treatment, emergency treatment, rehabilitation, scientific research, teaching and technical guidance.
- Linyi Maternal and Child Health Center: Formerly known as Linyi Children's Hospital, it was founded in 1986.
- Linyi Second People's Hospital: Linyi Yishui Central Hospital, founded in February 1945, is a municipal institution in Linyi, also known as Linyi Second People's Hospital.
- Linyi Cancer Hospital: Formerly known as the Tumor Ward of Linyi Regional People's Hospital, it became independent as Linyi Regional Tumor Institute in 1972.

== Cultural attractions ==
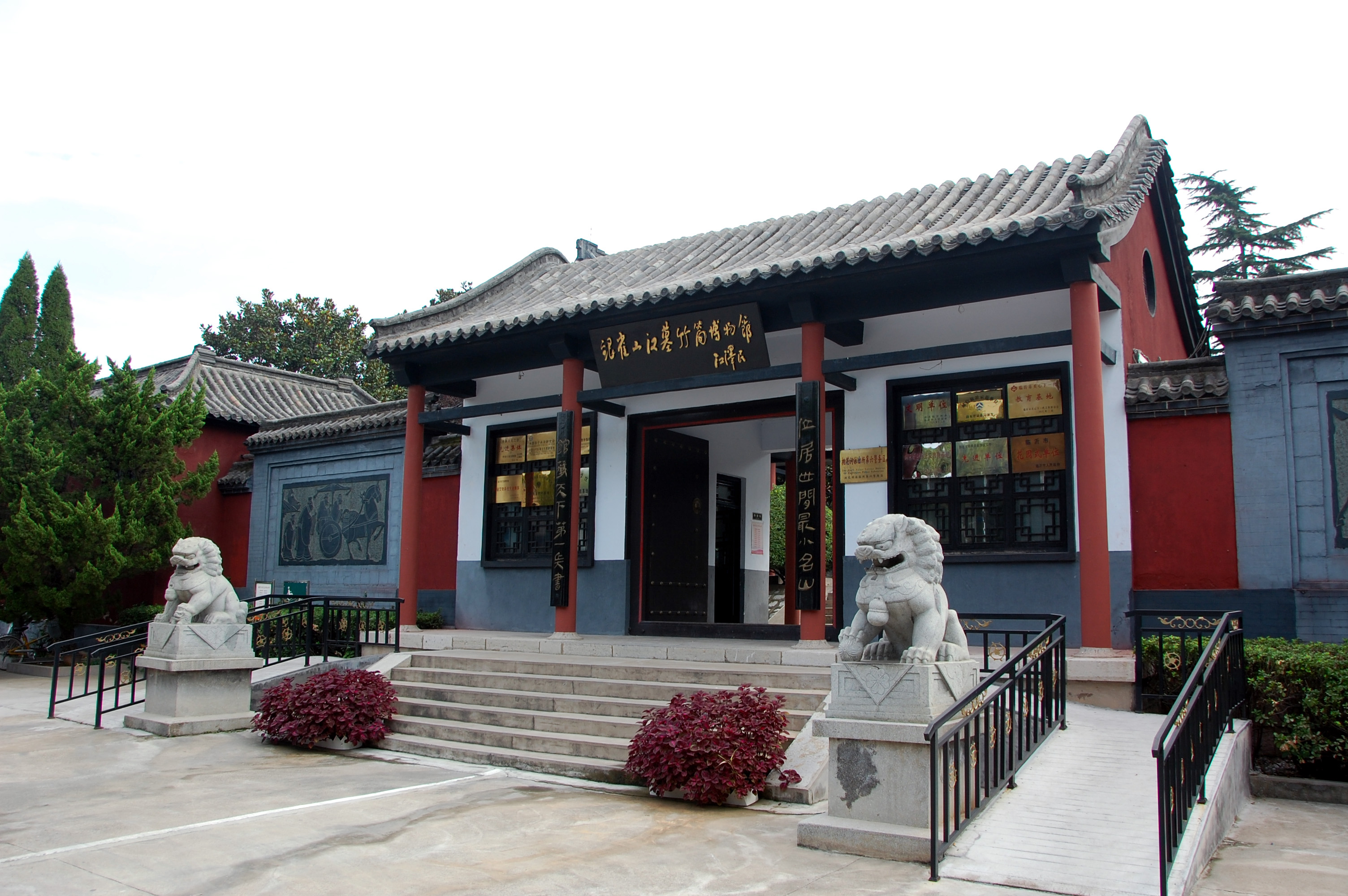
Yinqueshan Han Tombs Bamboo Slips Museum

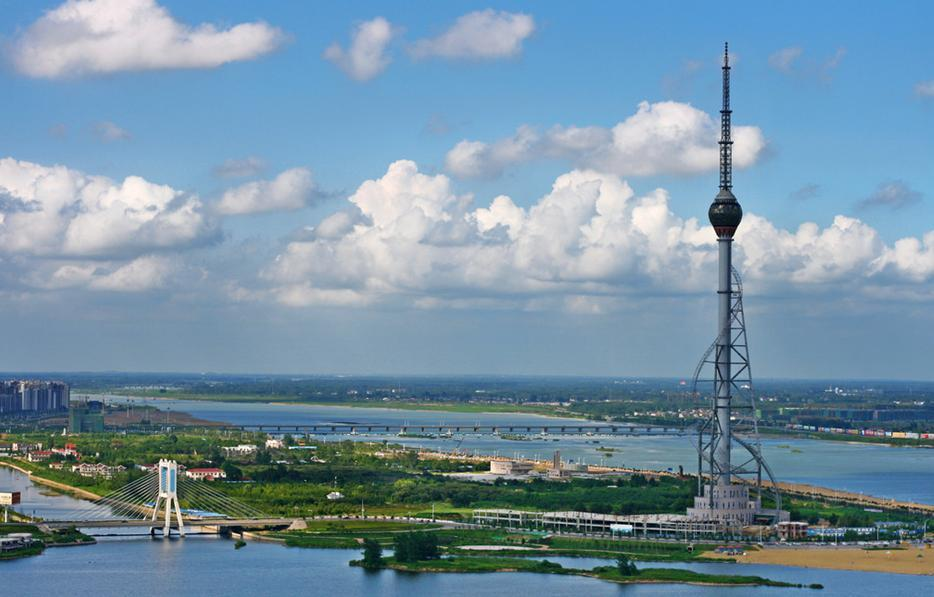
Linyi television tower

Linyi's focal point is the People's Square (Renmin Guangchang). It was built in the early 1990s on the site of an old army barracks. It is about 500 metres (1,600 ft) east-west, and about 300 m (980 ft) north-south. Underneath it is a shopping centre and entertainment facilities.

Just north of the center of the city, there is a park dedicated to Wang Xizhi, the former residence of Wang Xizhi. The former residence of Wang Xizhi is the birthplace of the great calligrapher Wang Xizhi. For a small entrance fee tourists can enjoy a peaceful walk and try Chinese calligraphy.

Near the center of Linyi city is a museum which houses some original bamboo strips from the Warring States period.

One of the pocket parks in Lanshan District, Linyi City, Shandong Province: Langya Garden, located on the east side of South Road at the intersection of Linxi 11th Road and Blossom River South Street, which covers an area of about 957 square meters.

Linyi Water Rhythm Langya is a water recreation attraction completed in September 2022. It covers an area of more than 20,000 square feet.

Linyi New Langya Nocturnal City is a commercial and cultural street to be built in Linyi around 2022. With performances and ancient buildings inside, every part of this place is a landmark in Linyi.

== See also ==
- List of twin towns and sister cities in China
