= Shanghe County =

Shanghe County 商河县 Shangho
- County
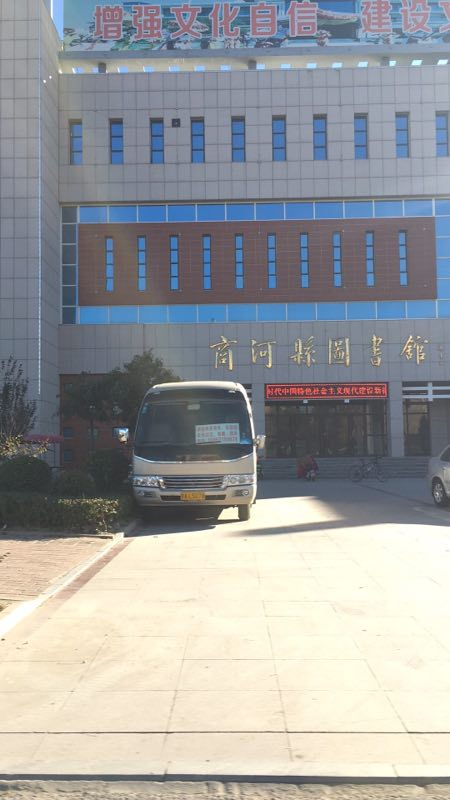

- Location in Shandong
- Coordinates: 37°18′43″N 117°09′22″E
- Country: People's Republic of China
- Province: Shandong
- Sub-provincial city: Jinan

Area
  - Total: 1,163.19 km^{2} (449.11 sq mi)
- Elevation: 19 m (62 ft)

Population (2018)
  - Total: 580,600
  - Density: 499.1/km^{2} (1,293/sq mi)
- Time zone: UTC+8 (China Standard)
- Postal code: 251600
- Area code: +86 0531
- Website: jsh.gov.cn

Shanghe County (simplified Chinese: 商河县; traditional Chinese: 商河縣; pinyin: Shānghé Xiàn) is under the administration of Jinan, the capital of Shandong province, People's Republic of China.

The population was 579,928 in 1999.

== Administrative divisions ==
As of 2012, this county is divided to 2 subdistricts, 5 towns and 5 townships.

Subdistricts

- Xushang Subdistrict (许商街道)
- Yuhuangmiao Subdistrict (玉皇庙街道)

Towns

- Yinxiang (殷巷镇)
- Huairen (怀仁镇)
- Longsangsi (龙桑寺镇)
- Zhenglu (郑路镇)
- Jiazhuang (贾庄镇)

Townships

- Sunji Township (孙集乡)
- Shahe Township (沙河乡)
- Hanmiao Township (韩庙乡)
- Zhangfang Township (张坊乡)
- Baiqiao Township (白桥乡)

== Climate ==
Climate data for Shanghe, elevation 15 m (49 ft), (1991–2020 normals, extremes 1959–present)
Month	Jan	Feb	Mar	Apr	May	Jun	Jul	Aug	Sep	Oct	Nov	Dec	Year
Record high °C (°F)	17.5 (63.5)	25.0 (77.0)	29.7 (85.5)	34.1 (93.4)	39.0 (102.2)	41.6 (106.9)	40.3 (104.5)	39.8 (103.6)	36.7 (98.1)	31.9 (89.4)	28.5 (83.3)	21.0 (69.8)	41.6 (106.9)
Mean daily maximum °C (°F)	3.4 (38.1)	7.4 (45.3)	14.1 (57.4)	20.8 (69.4)	26.6 (79.9)	31.5 (88.7)	31.9 (89.4)	30.3 (86.5)	27.0 (80.6)	20.8 (69.4)	12.1 (53.8)	4.9 (40.8)	19.2 (66.6)
Daily mean °C (°F)	−2.7 (27.1)	1.0 (33.8)	7.6 (45.7)	14.2 (57.6)	20.3 (68.5)	25.3 (77.5)	26.9 (80.4)	25.2 (77.4)	20.6 (69.1)	14.1 (57.4)	5.9 (42.6)	−0.9 (30.4)	13.1 (55.6)
Mean daily minimum °C (°F)	−7.3 (18.9)	−3.9 (25.0)	2.0 (35.6)	8.3 (46.9)	14.2 (57.6)	19.4 (66.9)	22.5 (72.5)	21.2 (70.2)	15.6 (60.1)	8.6 (47.5)	1.0 (33.8)	−5.3 (22.5)	8.0 (46.5)
Record low °C (°F)	−22.7 (−8.9)	−20.3 (−4.5)	−14.3 (6.3)	−3.3 (26.1)	2.2 (36.0)	9.4 (48.9)	12.4 (54.3)	12.2 (54.0)	3.5 (38.3)	−3.3 (26.1)	−14.3 (6.3)	−22.1 (−7.8)	−22.7 (−8.9)
Average precipitation mm (inches)	3.9 (0.15)	8.7 (0.34)	7.3 (0.29)	27.3 (1.07)	45.4 (1.79)	90.5 (3.56)	160.4 (6.31)	156.5 (6.16)	42.1 (1.66)	29.0 (1.14)	19.0 (0.75)	4.1 (0.16)	594.2 (23.38)
Average precipitation days (≥ 0.1 mm)	1.9	2.9	2.7	5.0	5.9	7.9	11.2	10.1	6.0	5.1	3.8	2.5	65
Average snowy days	2.7	2.7	0.9	0.2	0	0	0	0	0	0	1.0	1.8	9.3
Average relative humidity (%)	63	58	53	58	63	61	77	83	77	69	68	66	66
Mean monthly sunshine hours	165.2	169.0	225.9	250.3	279.1	254.3	217.1	211.2	204.3	201.0	171.4	164.9	2,513.7
Percentage possible sunshine	54	55	61	63	63	58	49	51	55	58	57	56	57
Source: China Meteorological AdministrationAll-time June low
