= Yishui County =

Yishui County 沂水县 Ishui
- County
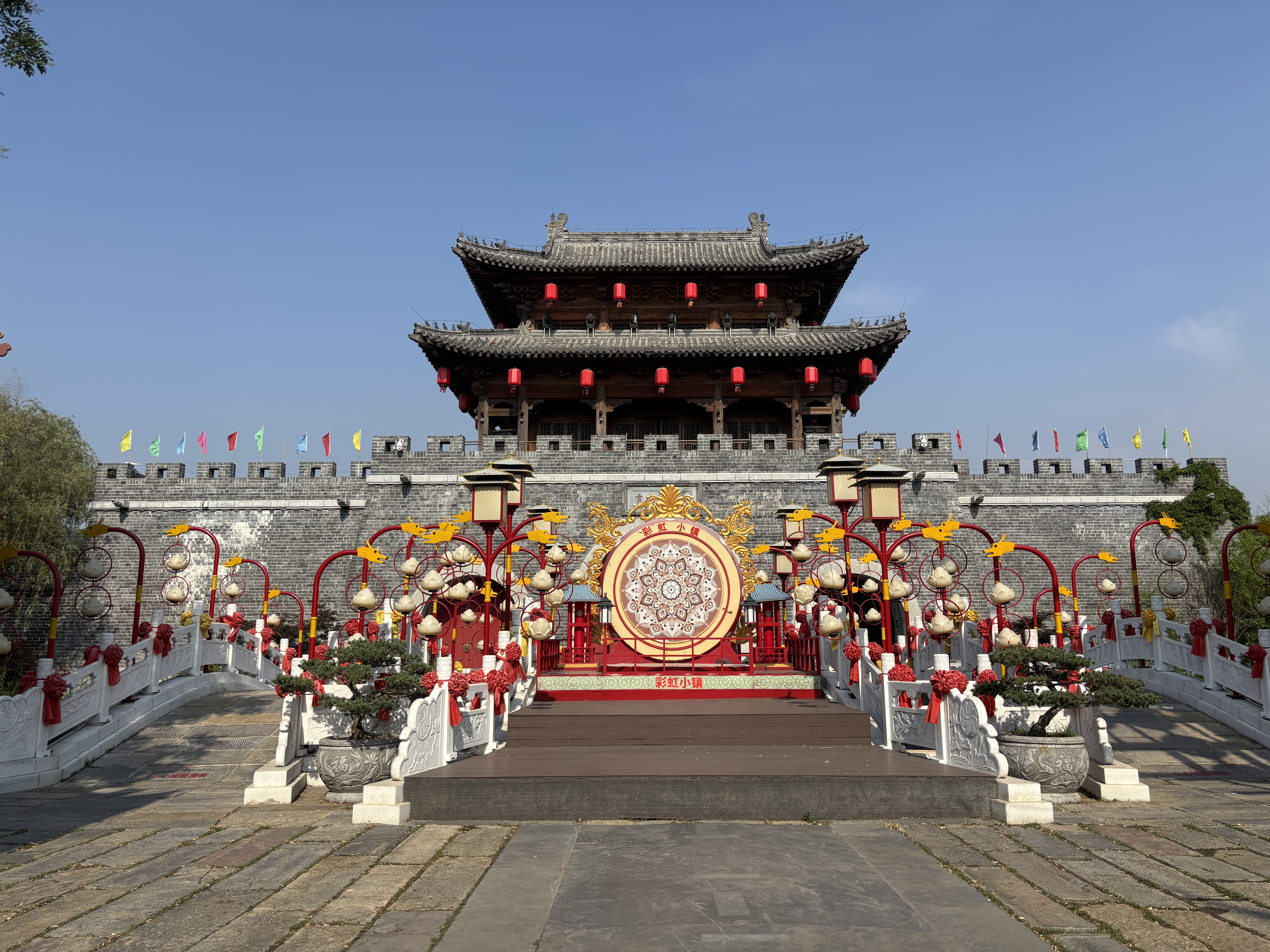
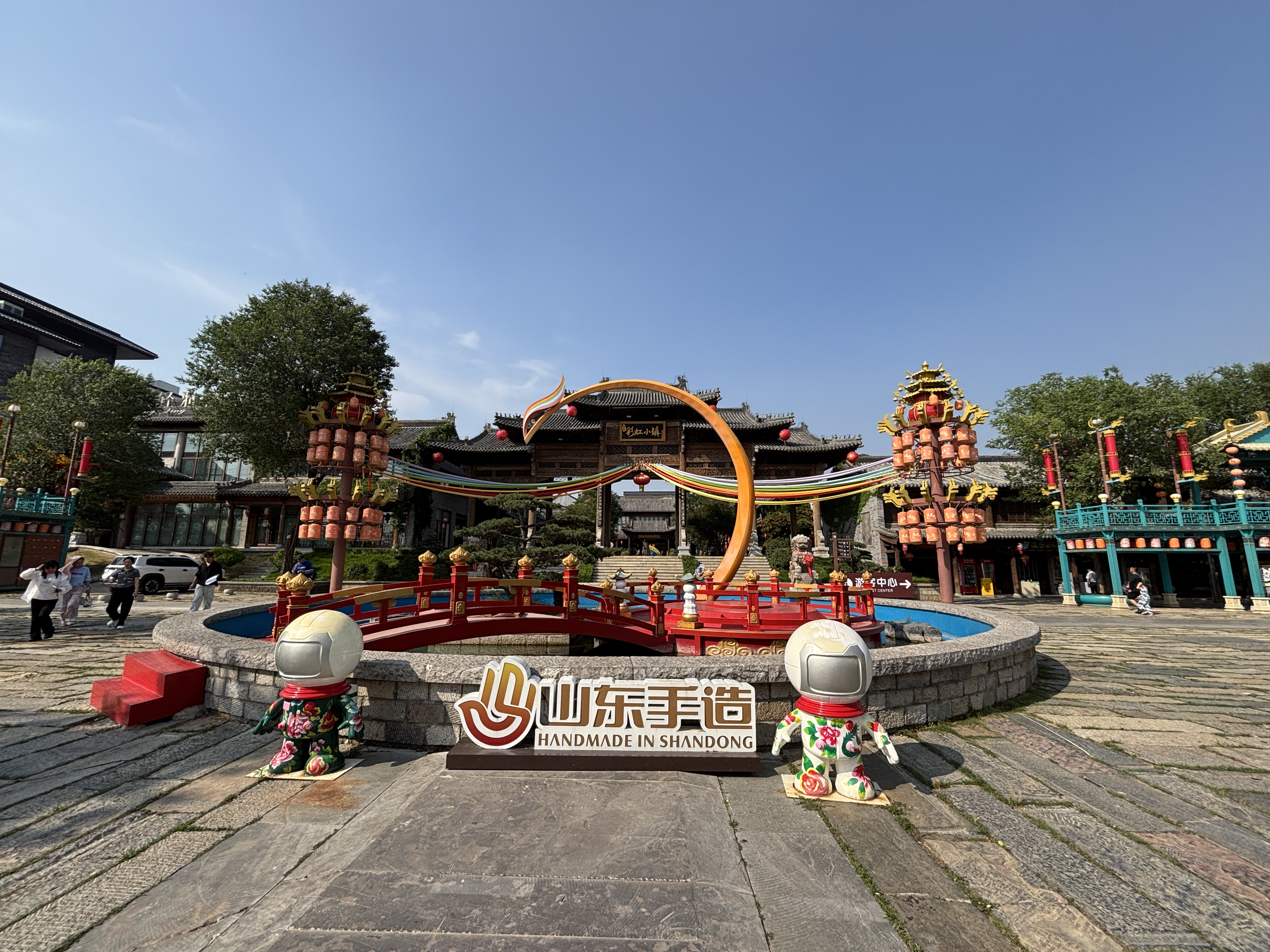
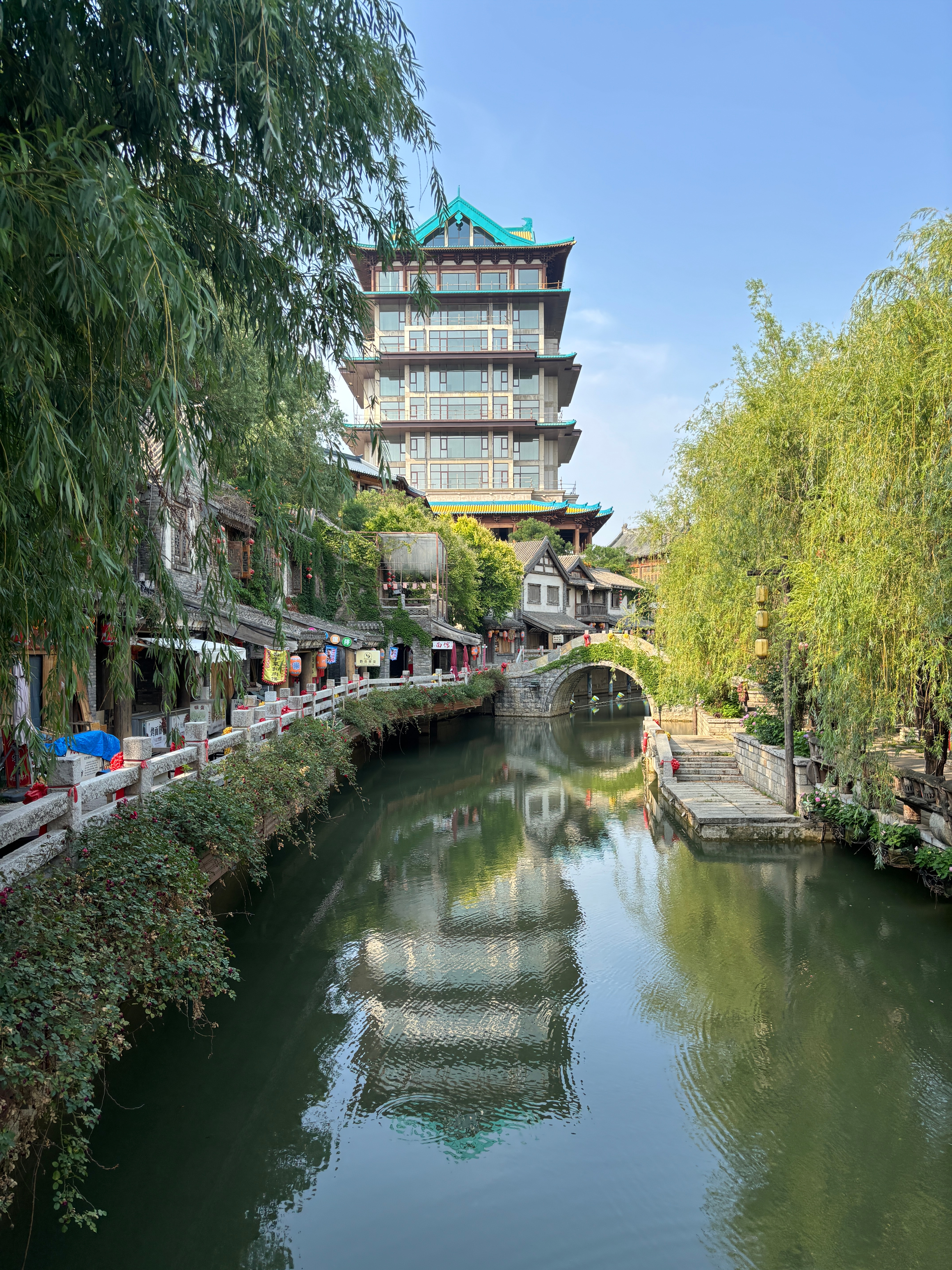
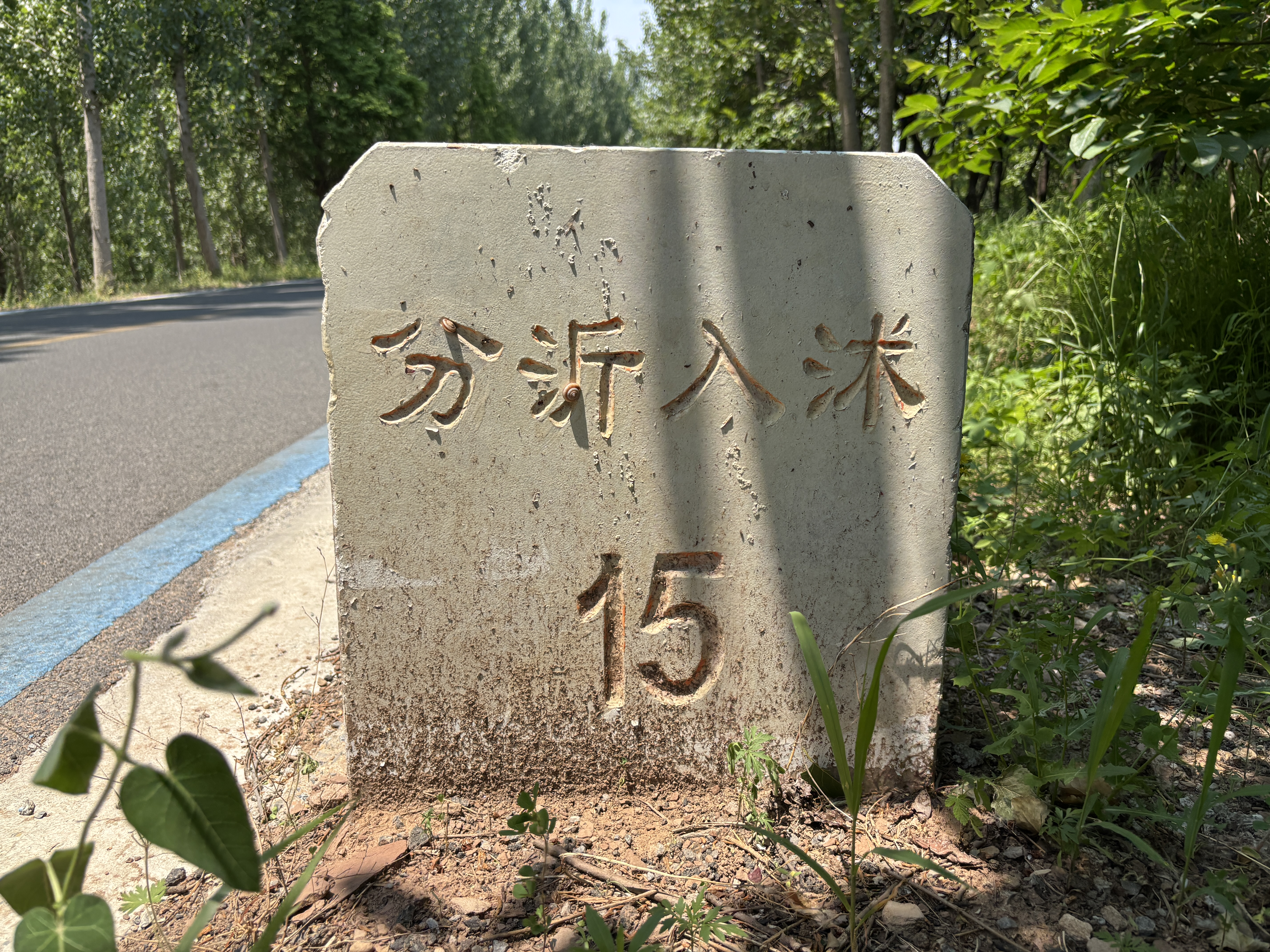
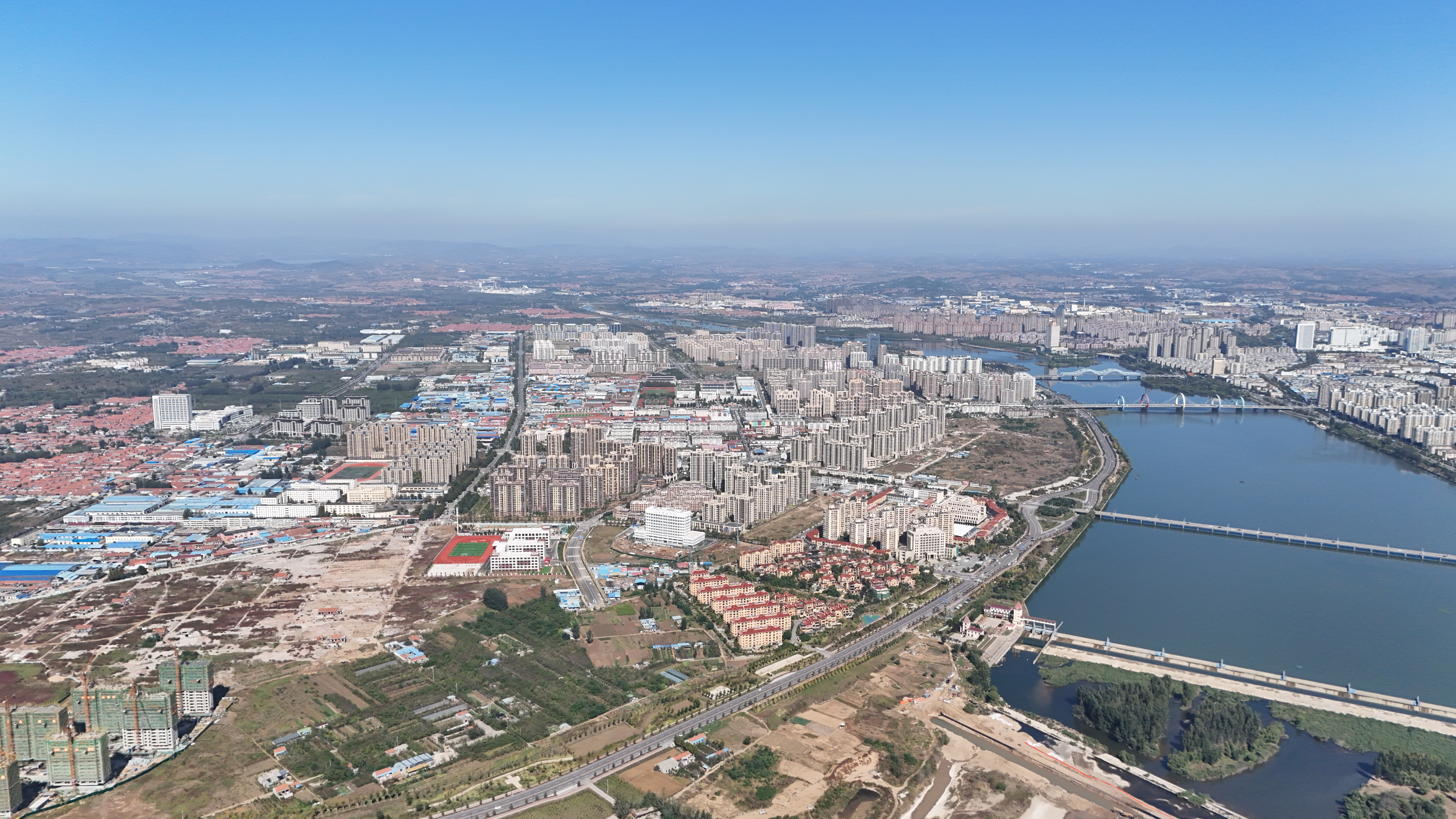

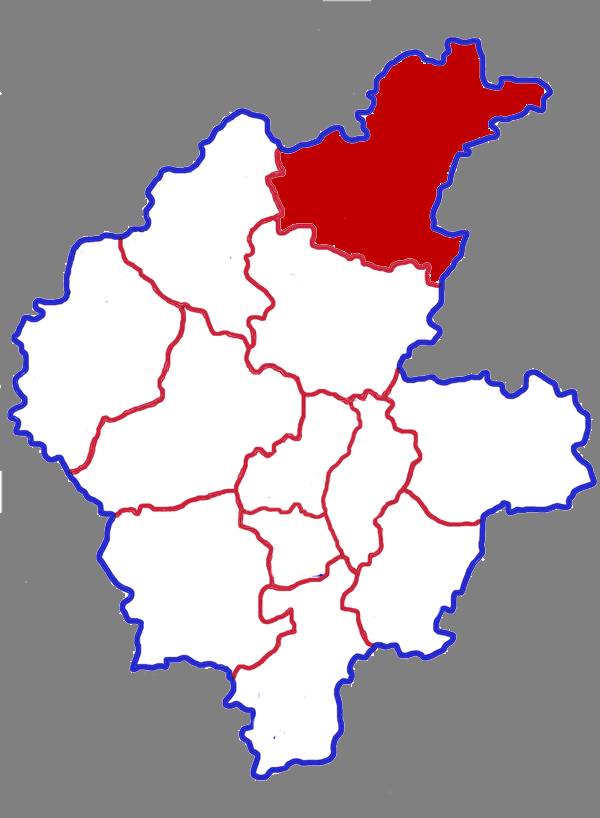
- Yishui in Linyi

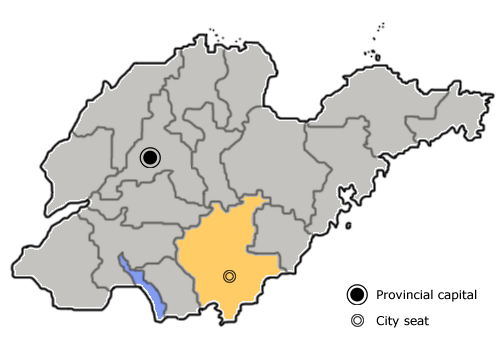
- Linyi in Shandong
- Coordinates: 35°47′24″N 118°37′41″E
- Country: China
- Province: Shandong
- Prefecture-level city: Linyi

Area
  - Total: 2,414 km^{2} (932 sq mi)
- Elevation: 163 m (535 ft)

Population (2019)
  - Total: 1,007,100
  - Density: 417.2/km^{2} (1,081/sq mi)
- Time zone: UTC+8 (China Standard)
- Postal code: 276400

Yishui County (simplified Chinese: 沂水县; traditional Chinese: 沂水縣; pinyin: Yíshuǐ Xiàn) is a county in the south-central part of Shandong province, People's Republic of China. Located in the central and southern region of Shandong, it lies in the hinterland of the Yimeng Mountain area and is situated in the upper reaches of the Yi River and Shu River.

== Geography and history ==
Yishui County borders Juxian County to the east, Yiyuan and Mengyin to the west, Yinan to the south, and Anqiu and Linqu to the north. It is the northernmost county-level division of the prefecture-level city of Linyi.

Yishui County is characterized by low mountains and hilly areas, with the western and northern regions being predominantly mountainous, the eastern and northeastern regions hilly, and the central and southern regions plains. The region is home to many herbaceous plants, while woody plants mainly include black locust, pine, and oak. Herbal plants primarily include yellow-backed grass, knotgrass, and thyme.

Yishui County has a long history, with prehistoric and more recent relics scattered throughout the area. At the Nanwa Cave site, from the late Paleolithic period, stone tools and deer antler fossils were unearthed. Fine stone tools have been discovered at 21 locations, including the top of the dry cave. Additionally, 35 Neolithic sites, including Guziding and Fengtai, have yielded stone, bone, and pottery artifacts from the Dawenkou and Longshan cultures. Relics from the Xia and Shang dynasties were also unearthed at these sites.

Yishui County has 43 open scenic spots rated above the 2A level, including one 5A-level and five 4A-level attractions.

== Administrative divisions ==
As of 2012, this county is divided to 13 towns and 6 townships.

Towns

- Yishui (沂水镇)
- Mazhan (马站镇)
- Gaoqiao (高桥镇)
- Xujiahu (许家湖镇)
- Huangshanpu (黄山铺镇)
- Yaodianzi (姚店子镇)
- Zhuge (诸葛镇)
- Cuijiayu (崔家峪镇)
- Sishilibao (四十里堡镇)
- Yangzhuang (杨庄镇)
- Xiawei (夏蔚镇)
- Shagou (沙沟镇)
- Gaozhuang (高庄镇)

Townships

- Daotuo Township (道托乡)
- Quanli Township (圈里乡)
- Longjiaquan Township (龙家圈乡)
- Quanzhuang Township (泉庄乡)
- Fuguanzhuang Township (富官庄乡)
- Yuandongtou Township (院东头乡)

== Climate ==
Climate data for Yishui, elevation 187 m (614 ft), (1991–2020 normals, extremes 1981–2010)
Month	Jan	Feb	Mar	Apr	May	Jun	Jul	Aug	Sep	Oct	Nov	Dec	Year
Record high °C (°F)	15.2 (59.4)	24.3 (75.7)	29.1 (84.4)	35.6 (96.1)	39.2 (102.6)	37.7 (99.9)	41.7 (107.1)	38.6 (101.5)	38.0 (100.4)	33.1 (91.6)	26.1 (79.0)	19.0 (66.2)	41.7 (107.1)
Mean daily maximum °C (°F)	3.9 (39.0)	7.2 (45.0)	13.5 (56.3)	20.6 (69.1)	26.1 (79.0)	29.5 (85.1)	30.5 (86.9)	29.7 (85.5)	26.4 (79.5)	20.8 (69.4)	12.8 (55.0)	5.8 (42.4)	18.9 (66.0)
Daily mean °C (°F)	−1.4 (29.5)	1.5 (34.7)	7.2 (45.0)	14.0 (57.2)	19.9 (67.8)	23.7 (74.7)	26.0 (78.8)	25.2 (77.4)	21.0 (69.8)	14.9 (58.8)	7.4 (45.3)	0.7 (33.3)	13.3 (56.0)
Mean daily minimum °C (°F)	−5.4 (22.3)	−2.8 (27.0)	2.1 (35.8)	8.6 (47.5)	14.5 (58.1)	19.0 (66.2)	22.5 (72.5)	21.7 (71.1)	16.7 (62.1)	10.1 (50.2)	3.0 (37.4)	−3.2 (26.2)	8.9 (48.0)
Record low °C (°F)	−16.8 (1.8)	−15.5 (4.1)	−9.5 (14.9)	−2.9 (26.8)	3.3 (37.9)	10.7 (51.3)	15.6 (60.1)	12.7 (54.9)	6.5 (43.7)	−2.8 (27.0)	−9.8 (14.4)	−17.2 (1.0)	−17.2 (1.0)
Average precipitation mm (inches)	9.0 (0.35)	14.5 (0.57)	17.1 (0.67)	33.3 (1.31)	63.6 (2.50)	89.8 (3.54)	193.9 (7.63)	201.2 (7.92)	62.5 (2.46)	30.5 (1.20)	29.4 (1.16)	11.9 (0.47)	756.7 (29.78)
Average precipitation days (≥ 0.1 mm)	2.8	3.8	3.8	6.3	6.9	8.8	12.9	12.8	7.3	5.4	4.9	3.4	79.1
Average snowy days	4.1	3.0	1.6	0.1	0	0	0	0	0	0	0.7	2.3	11.8
Average relative humidity (%)	61	59	55	56	61	69	81	82	75	68	66	63	66
Mean monthly sunshine hours	172.2	168.2	209.4	225.5	251.4	216.8	187.9	191.2	195.3	192.0	166.6	171.5	2,348
Percentage possible sunshine	55	54	56	57	58	50	43	46	53	56	55	57	53
Source: China Meteorological Administration all-time August record high

Yishui County belongs to the warm temperate monsoon climate zone, characterized by a distinct continental climate with clearly defined seasonal changes.

== Population ==
The population was 1,115,927 in 1999.

The population in 2022 was 1,184,583.

In 2023, Yishui County had a household population of 1,185,570.

== Main tourist attractions ==
- Yishui National Wetland Park centers around the Trekking Mountain Reservoir and the Yi River channel. It is divided into five functional areas: the ecological conservation area, the ecological restoration area, the science popularization and education area, the rational utilization area, and the management service area.
- The Former Site of Shandong Sub-Bureau of the Chinese Communist Party is a provincial cultural relics protection unit.
- The Jiwang Mesa burial mound contains excavated artifacts including jade, bronze, bone, pottery, and lacquerware. Among the finds are bronze ritual vessels with inscriptions, musical instruments such as chimes, and groups of jade vessels. In 2019, it was selected as part of the eighth batch of national key cultural relics protection units.
- The ruins of Muling Pass on the Qi Great Wall is the most famous pass on the ancient Qi Great Wall of China, which has a history of 2,800 years. In 1987, the Qi Great Wall was listed on the World Cultural Heritage List. In 2001, the Qi Great Wall site was included in the fifth batch of national key cultural relics protection units.
