= Yiyuan County =

Yiyuan County 沂源县
- County
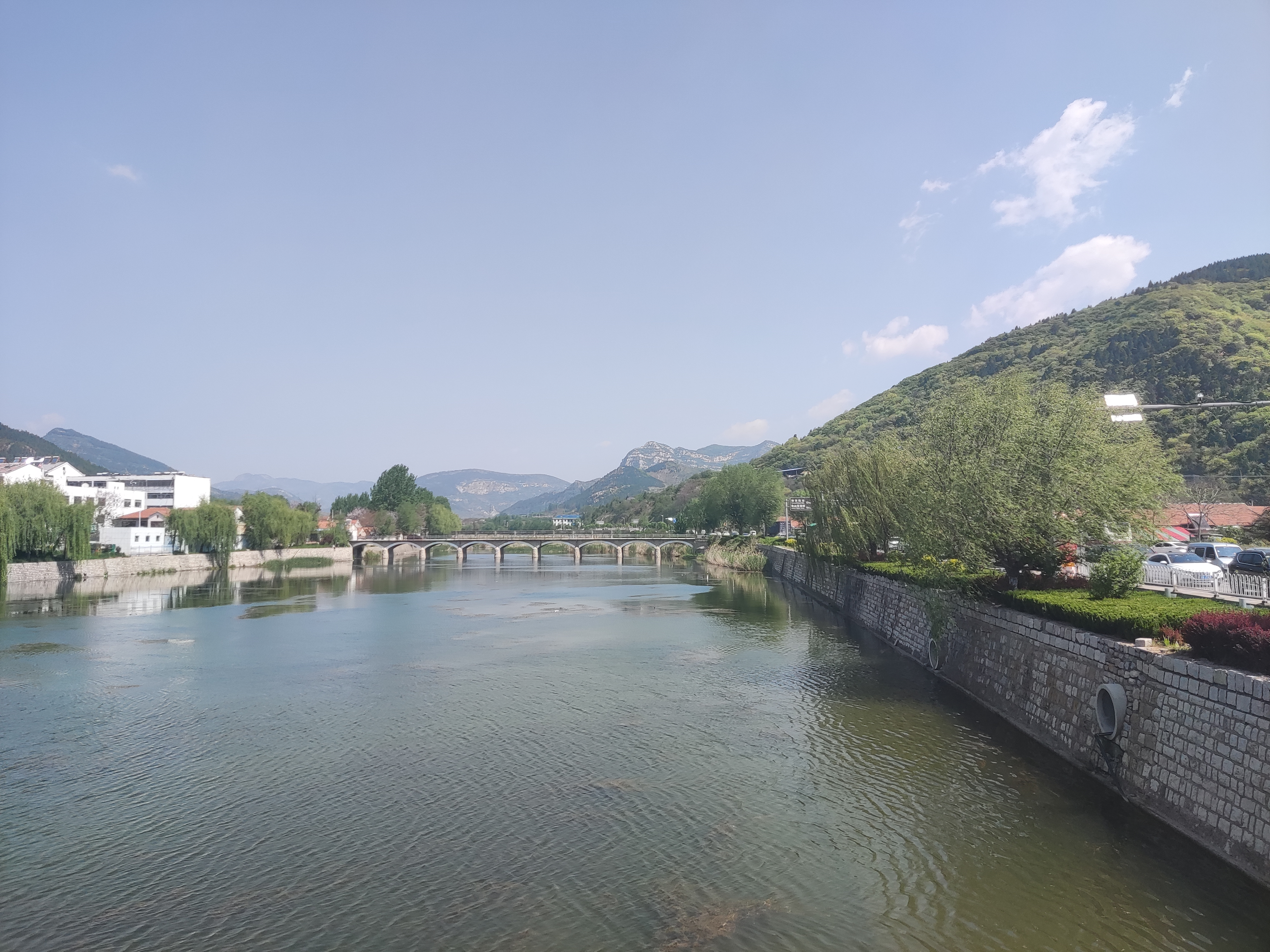
- Tanglang River

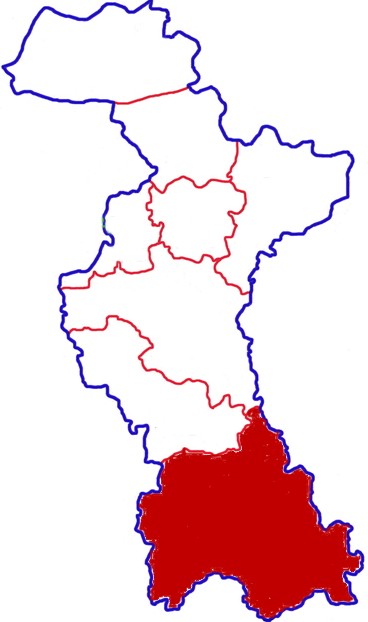
- Location in Zibo

- Location of the seat in Shandong
- Coordinates (Yiyuan County government): 36°11′06″N 118°10′15″E
- Country: People's Republic of China
- Province: Shandong
- Prefecture-level city: Zibo

Area
  - Water: 1,636 km^{2} (632 sq mi)

Population
  - Total: 576,000
- Time zone: UTC+8 (China Standard Time)
- Website: www.yiyuan.gov.cn

Yiyuan County (Chinese: 沂源; pinyin: Yíyuán; Wade–Giles: Iyüan) is a county in the centre of China's Shandong province and is located in the deep Tai-yi Mountains, and is the southernmost county-level division under the jurisdiction of Zibo City. It had a population of 576,000 according to the county government, of which 104,200 lives in the county town. Yiyuan has the nickname of “Roof of Shandong” because of its highest average altitude among all counties within the province.

== History ==
Yiyuan county is home to a number of archaeological finds, particularly humanoid fossils. One such fossil, referred to as the "Yiyuan ape-man fossil" is estimated to date back between 400,000 and 500,000 years ago. One such fossil, referred to as the "Yiyuan ape-man fossil" is estimated to date back between 400,000 and 500,000 years ago.

A 2019 study using 26Al/10Be burial dating estimated the age of the Yiyuan hominin fossils at approximately 0.64 ± 0.08 million years.

Yiyuan people are also proud of local archeological findings...Yiyuan people are also proud of local archeological findings from the Palæolithic and Neolithic Ages as well as cultural findings since the Shang Dynasty. The county is thought to be the setting for the famous Chinese legend of The Cowherd and the Weaver Girl. It is estimated by the county government that 23,000 people from Yiyuan fought during the Japanese Invasion of China. Of these 23,000 people, approximately 1,800 are thought to have died, with another 2,100 thought to be injured.

== Geography ==
Yiyuan is located in the middle of Shandong Province, approximately 100 km (62 mi) away from Jinan and Zibo, and 170 km (110 mi) away from Qingdao. The county town is located beside one of the most important rivers in the province- the Yi River, and the name "沂源" literally means "the beginning of (the) Yi (River)".

Yiyuan County is generally mountainous, with the highest peak, Lu Mountain, having an altitude of 1,108 m (3,635 ft). Over 62% of the county is covered with forests, which has helped it receive a number of titles from the national government for its high marks in environmental conservation.

== Climate ==
It has a continental climate in the warm temperate monsoon region with four distinct seasons. Because of the influence of mountainous terrain, microclimate characteristics are obvious, and the threat of drought is more serious.

Climate data for Yiyuan, elevation 305 m (1,001 ft), (1991–2020 normals, extremes 1981–2010)
Month	Jan	Feb	Mar	Apr	May	Jun	Jul	Aug	Sep	Oct	Nov	Dec	Year
Record high °C (°F)	17.6 (63.7)	21.5 (70.7)	28.9 (84.0)	33.9 (93.0)	37.4 (99.3)	38.3 (100.9)	40.0 (104.0)	37.0 (98.6)	37.4 (99.3)	34.2 (93.6)	25.1 (77.2)	19.2 (66.6)	40.0 (104.0)
Mean daily maximum °C (°F)	3.4 (38.1)	6.9 (44.4)	13.2 (55.8)	20.4 (68.7)	26.1 (79.0)	29.6 (85.3)	30.6 (87.1)	29.4 (84.9)	25.8 (78.4)	20.0 (68.0)	12.2 (54.0)	5.3 (41.5)	18.6 (65.4)
Daily mean °C (°F)	−2.0 (28.4)	1.1 (34.0)	7.0 (44.6)	14.2 (57.6)	20.0 (68.0)	23.9 (75.0)	25.9 (78.6)	24.8 (76.6)	20.3 (68.5)	13.9 (57.0)	6.4 (43.5)	−0.1 (31.8)	13.0 (55.3)
Mean daily minimum °C (°F)	−6.3 (20.7)	−3.5 (25.7)	1.8 (35.2)	8.6 (47.5)	14.2 (57.6)	18.7 (65.7)	22.1 (71.8)	21.1 (70.0)	15.8 (60.4)	9.0 (48.2)	1.9 (35.4)	−4.1 (24.6)	8.3 (46.9)
Record low °C (°F)	−21.4 (−6.5)	−17.1 (1.2)	−10.1 (13.8)	−4.2 (24.4)	1.4 (34.5)	9.0 (48.2)	14.6 (58.3)	11.5 (52.7)	5.0 (41.0)	−3.6 (25.5)	−12.5 (9.5)	−18.9 (−2.0)	−21.4 (−6.5)
Average precipitation mm (inches)	6.6 (0.26)	12.4 (0.49)	13.6 (0.54)	32.3 (1.27)	50.0 (1.97)	96.0 (3.78)	197.2 (7.76)	189.9 (7.48)	73.6 (2.90)	28.3 (1.11)	25.1 (0.99)	9.5 (0.37)	734.5 (28.92)
Average precipitation days (≥ 0.1 mm)	2.7	3.6	4.0	5.6	7.0	9.1	13.2	12.4	7.0	5.3	4.5	3.5	77.9
Average snowy days	4.1	3.3	1.6	0.2	0	0	0	0	0	0	1.4	2.6	13.2
Average relative humidity (%)	57	54	49	50	55	63	77	79	71	66	63	59	62
Mean monthly sunshine hours	159.8	162.2	210.5	227.0	249.6	212.2	178.9	178.6	185.9	186.6	161.8	159.1	2,272.2
Percentage possible sunshine	51	52	56	58	57	49	40	43	51	54	53	53	51
Source: China Meteorological Administration

== Administrative divisions ==
Yiyuan County is divided into 2 subdistricts and 10 towns.

=== Subdistricts ===
The county's 2 subdistricts are Lishan Subdistrict and Nanma Subdistrict.

=== Towns ===
The county's 10 towns are Lucun, Dongli, Yuezhuang, Xili, Dazhangzhuang, Zhongzhuang, Zhangjiapo, Yanya, Shiqiao, and Nanlushan.

== Economy ==
As of 2022, the county's gross domestic product (GDP) totaled 32.88 billion renminbi (RMB), a 7.3% increase from 2021.

== Main tourist attractions ==
Yiyuan Ape Man Site. 40 to 50 million years ago and "Beijing Ape Man" at the same time, is the distant ancestor of Shandong people. In 1981, Yiyuan Ape Man fossils were found in Yiyuan. In 2006, the Yiyuan Ape Man Site was listed in the sixth batch of national key cultural relics protection units by the State Council.

Qinglong Lake Scenic Spot. In the scenic area, there are Qinglong Lake, Qinglong Mountain, Qinglong Sculpture, Lotus Pond, Organic Vegetable and Grain Planting Base, Fruit and Vegetable Picking Garden, and Stallion Resort. At the top of the mountain, there are temples such as Jade Temple and Bixia Temple.

Tangshan Scenic Area. The mountain is also known as Nine-topped Lotus Mountain because it is surrounded by nine peaks. The forest coverage rate is more than 98 per cent, which is a natural oxygen bar. In the scenic area, there are the Maitreya Temple, Guanyin Pavilion, cliff statues, thousand-year-old ginkgoes and ancient wells.

Cuiping Mountain Scenic Area. This is a national AA level tourist attraction, the scenic spot has the original ecological mountain landscape scene of Yimeng Mountain and the countryside landscape environment of field ridge. The forest coverage rate reaches 91.5 per cent. It is a forest and fruit belt with the highest altitude in Shandong Province, which has the value of sightseeing tour, leisure holiday and scientific investigation.

Lushan Cave Group Scenic Area. It is a national 4A level scenic spot, the fourth highest peak in Shandong Province, and historically the boundary mountain between Qi and Lu. Lushan National Forest Park covers a total area of 2,667 hectares (6,590 acres), with a forest coverage rate of 95.2%, which is a typical mountain-type scenic area. There are more than 1,000 kinds of plants and animals in the park, and the park is a “natural oxygen bar” with dense vegetation and high content of negative oxygen ions.

Former site of the 618th war radio station. This is a national 3A level tourist attraction, formerly Shandong People's Broadcasting Station war station. It is one of the largest and most well-preserved old sites of war radio in East China. It is an important red national defense education base in the province, and the first batch of study trip base in Zibo City.
