= Luozhuang, Linyi =

Luozhuang 罗庄区 Lochwang
- District
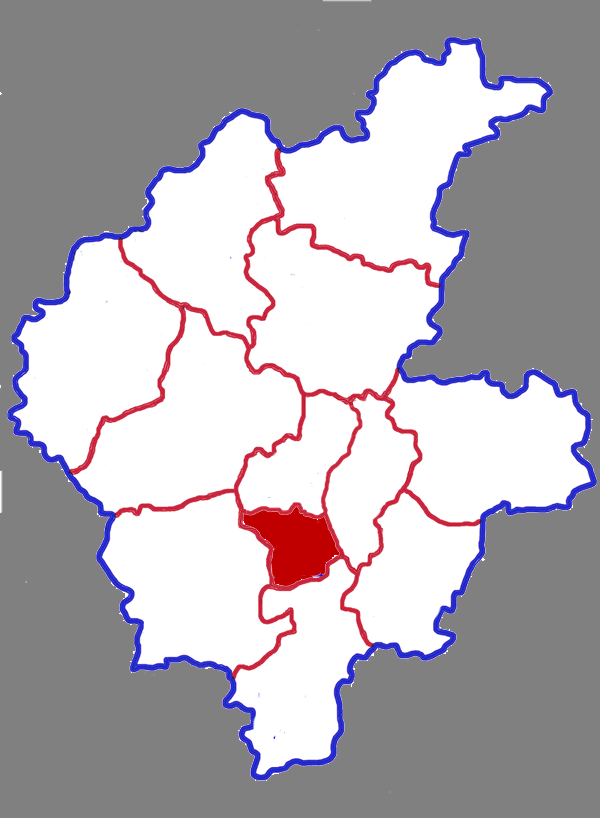

- Location in Shandong
- Coordinates: 34°59′48″N 118°17′05″E
- Country: People's Republic of China
- Province: Shandong
- Prefecture-level city: Linyi

Area
  - Total: 642 km^{2} (248 sq mi)

Population (2019)
  - Total: 568,000
  - Density: 885/km^{2} (2,290/sq mi)
- Time zone: UTC+8 (China Standard)
- Postal code: 276017

Luozhuang (simplified Chinese: 罗庄区; traditional Chinese: 羅莊區; pinyin: Luózhuāng Qū) is a district of the city of Linyi, Shandong province, China. It has an area of approximately 642 km^{2} (248 sq mi) and around 568,000 inhabitants (2019).

== Administrative divisions ==
As 2012, this district is divided to 8 subdistricts.

Subdistricts

- Luozhuang Subdistrict (罗庄街道)
- Fuzhuang Subdistrict (付庄街道)
- Shengzhuang Subdistrict (盛庄街道)
- Tangzhuang Subdistrict (汤庄街道)
- Shuangyuehu Subdistrict (双月湖街道)
- Ceshan Subdistrict (册山街道)
- Gaodu Subdistrict (高都街道)
- Luoxi Subdistrict (罗西街道)
