= Wang Xizhi =

Chinese calligrapher (c. 303 – c. 361)

- 王羲之
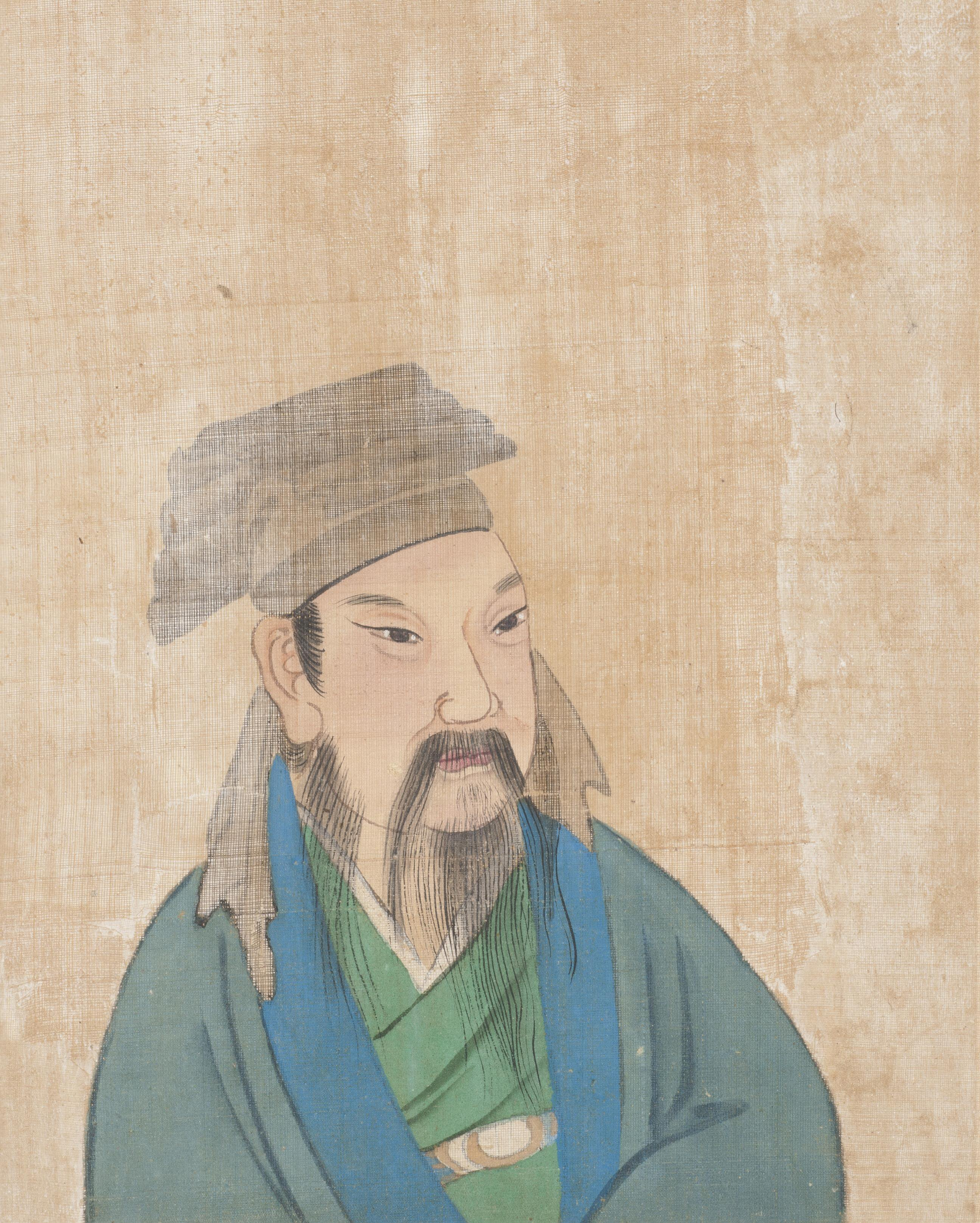
- Depicted in Portraits of Famous Men, 19th – early 20th century
- Born: c. 303; Linyi County, Langya Commandery, Western Jin (today's Lanshan District, Linyi, Shandong Province)
- Died: c. 361 (aged 58); Xiaojia Village, Shan County, Kuaiji Commandery, Eastern Jin (today's Shengzhou, Zhejiang Province)
- Known for: Chinese calligraphy
- Notable work: Lantingji xu
- Family: Wang clan of Langya

Chinese name
- Chinese: 王羲之
Transcriptions
Standard Mandarin
- Hanyu Pinyin: Wáng Xīzhī
- Wade–Giles: Wang^{2} Hsi^{1}-chih^{1}
- IPA: [wǎŋ ɕí.ʈʂɻ̩́]
Yue: Cantonese
- Yale Romanization: Wòhng Hēijī
- Jyutping: Wong^{4} Hei^{1}-zi^{1}
- IPA: [wɔŋ˩ hej˥.tsi˥]
Southern Min
- Hokkien POJ: Ông Hi-chi
- Tâi-lô: Ông Hi-tsi

Wang Xizhi (Chinese: 王羲之; courtesy name: Yishao (逸少); c. 303 – c. 361) was a Chinese politician, general, and calligrapher from the Jin dynasty (266–420) known for his mastery of Chinese calligraphy. He is often regarded as the greatest calligrapher in Chinese history. His most famous work, composed in 353, is the Lantingji xu (蘭亭集序; "Preface to the Poems Composed at the Orchid Pavilion").

Born in Langya Commandery (in present-day Linyi, Shandong), Wang fled to southern China in his childhood after the collapse of the Western Jin dynasty. He studied calligraphy under the tutelage of relatives, including Wei Shuo, and became engaged to Xi Xuan around the year 323. They had eight children, including Wang Xianzhi, who later became a renowned calligrapher in his own right. Between 324 and 354, Wang Xizhi served in various government positions. He received his highest title, "General of the Right Army", in 347, and was appointed administrator of Kuaiji (present-day Shaoxing, Zhejiang). In 353, he hosted 41 of his friends, relatives, and pupils at the Orchid Pavilion Gathering on Mount Kuaiji. There, the participants took part in a "winding stream party" and Wang composed the Lantingji xu, a preface to the collection of poems that were written that day. He retired from governmental service in 355, devoted himself to Taoist practices, and died c. 361 in Jinting (present-day Shengzhou, Zhejiang).

Wang is known for his proficiency in multiple Chinese script styles, particularly the regular, semi-cursive, and cursive forms. Apart from the Lantingji xu and his letters to others, he mainly produced copies of existing texts. His works were enthusiastically collected by both emperors and private collectors. In particular, Emperor Taizong of Tang established Wang and his style as the defining standard for Chinese calligraphy by requiring that the imperial court scholars study his techniques and employing calligraphers to make handwritten tracing copies and ink rubbings of his works. There are no known surviving original works by Wang – only rubbings and a small number of tracing copies. Wang's artistic talent continues to be held in high esteem, and he remains an influential figure in East Asian calligraphy.

== Life ==
=== Historical sources ===
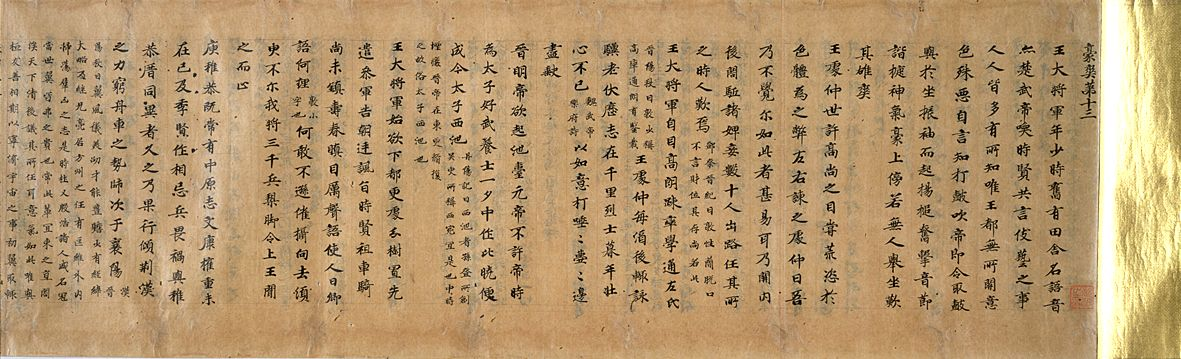
Partial transcription of the Shishuo xinyu from the Tang dynasty, 7th–8th century

Much of what is known about Wang Xizhi's life is derived from letters that he wrote during his lifetime and historical texts such as the Shishuo xinyu (世說新語) and the Jin shu (晉書). Wang makes 47 appearances within the 1,130 historical anecdotes of the Shishuo xinyu, which was originally compiled during the 5th century. These anecdotes describe his interactions with contemporaries such as the statesman Xie An and the poet Sun Chuo. The Jin shu, which details the history of the Jin dynasty (266–420), contains his official biography in its 80th volume. The work was commissioned in the 7th century by Emperor Taizong of Tang, who personally wrote a postscript to Wang's biography declaring him the greatest calligrapher in history.

Modern scholars have questioned the reliability and accuracy of these early sources. Xiaofei Tian, a scholar of Chinese literature, writes that the compilers of the Shishuo Xinyu, in an attempt to evoke feelings of nostalgia, were often "willing to sacrifice historical accuracy for the sake of a good story". Matthew V. Wells suggests that Emperor Taizong's unusual degree of involvement in the compilation of the Jin shu may have been motivated by a desire to create a pro-imperial work and revise the presentation of historical events for his own purposes. In his analysis of the Jin shu biography of Wang Dao, the uncle of Wang Xizhi, Wells observes that its authors selectively omitted anecdotes from the Shishuo xinyu that were unflattering or otherwise did not depict Wang Dao as a model statesman. Because many other historical accounts of the Jin dynasty have not survived, the Jin shu and the Shishuo xinyu continue to be referenced as rich sources of information about the era, despite their limitations.

=== Early years and family ===
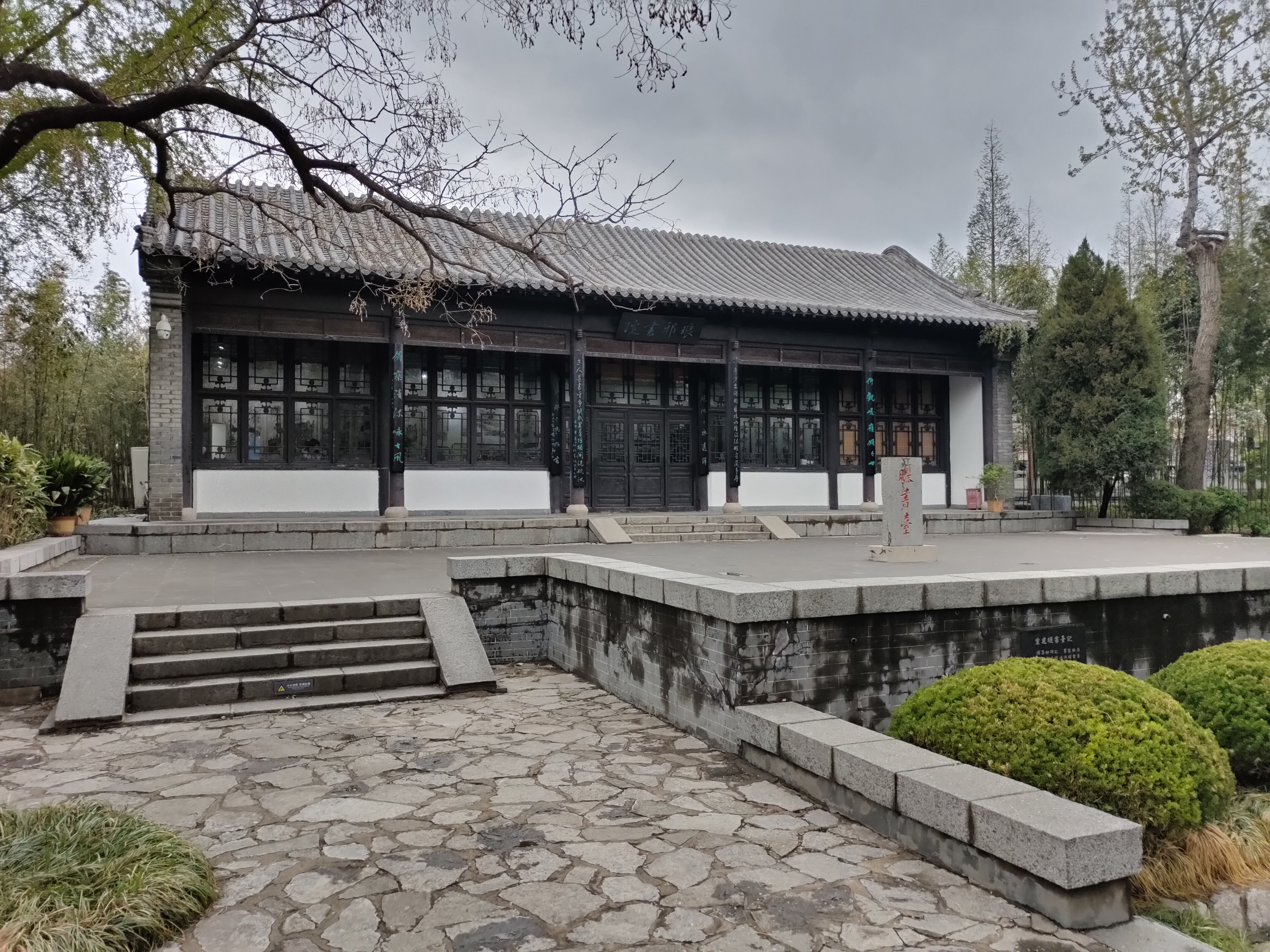
Site of Wang's childhood residence in Linyi

Wang Xizhi was born c. 303 (Note: The exact years of Wang Xizhi's birth and death are disputed. He is frequently described as having lived from 303 to 361, as recorded in the Zhengao (真誥) by Tao Hongjing. Based on other historical sources and calculations, other scholars have proposed alternative ranges, such as 321–379, 305–363, or 307–365.) in Linyi in Langya Commandery (present-day Linyi, Shandong). During his childhood, his personal name was A'tu (阿菟). He was later given the courtesy name Yishao (逸少) and adopted the studio name Danzhai (澹齋). He was a member of an aristocratic family, the Wang clan of Langya, and his father, Wang Kuang (王旷), was the governor of Huainan. With the collapse of the Western Jin dynasty following the capture and execution of Emperor Huai, the Wang family fled to southern China and helped establish the Eastern Jin in 317. Together with other aristocratic immigrants such as the Xie clan of Chen, they dominated the regional politics of this period. Wang Xizhi was a fourth-generation descendant of Wang Lan, who was the younger half-brother of Wang Xiang.

In his youth, Wang had difficulties with his speech, but he became a skilled orator later in life. He studied calligraphy under the tutelage of Wei Shuo, also known as "Lady Wei", who was Wang Kuang's cousin. Wang Kuang was also involved in his son's lessons, working with Wei to teach him the techniques of the calligrapher Cai Yong. Wei Shuo was a specialist in the clerical, regular, and semi-cursive script styles of Chinese calligraphy, and gave lessons on selection of calligraphy supplies, proper posture, and basic stroke techniques. Wang Xizhi also learned calligraphy from his uncle, Wang Yi (王廙), a painter and calligrapher who was married to the sister of Emperor Yuan of Jin. (Note: In Wang Yi's biography in vol.76 of Jin Shu, he was described as Emperor Yuan's yidi (而元帝姨弟也); the term yidi is ambiguous as it can mean the younger brother or son of one's maternal aunt or one's wife. Wang's name was also recorded as "Hao" (暠) in some parts of Jin Shu, including the annals of Emperor Yuan (vol.6), Sima Cheng's biography (vol.37), Xun Xu's biography (vol.39, under the entry for Xun Fan's sons Xun Sui and Xun Kai), Guo Shu's biography (vol.43), Huangfu Fanghui's biography (vol.51), Xiahou Zhan's biography (where he was described as Xiahou Cheng's maternal cousin (waixiong, 外兄)), and Du Zeng's biography (vol.100). By comparing the record in Emperor Yuan's annals ([永昌元年]冬十月，...己丑，都督荆梁二州诸军事、平南将军、荆州刺史、武陵侯王暠卒。) and the record in vol.92 of Zizhi Tongjian ([永昌元年]冬，十月，己丑，荆州刺史武陵康侯王廙卒。), it can be deduced that "Wang Yi" and "Wang Hao" were referring to the same person. Huangfu Fanghui was a son of Huangfu Mi and Xiahou Zhan was a grandson of Xiahou Wei.) After his parents died, Wang Xizhi lived in the household of his uncle Wang Dao, a prominent politician and the patriarch of the Wang family. Wang Dao helped suppress attempted coups by his cousin Wang Dun in 322 and 324. Wang Xizhi's reaction to these conflicts between his uncles, (Note: Wang Kuang was a cousin of Wang Dao and Wang Dun; Dao's and Dun's grandfather Wang Lan (王览) was Wang Xizhi's great-grandfather.) which ultimately resulted in Wang Dun's death in 324, left him with a distaste for political and military affairs.

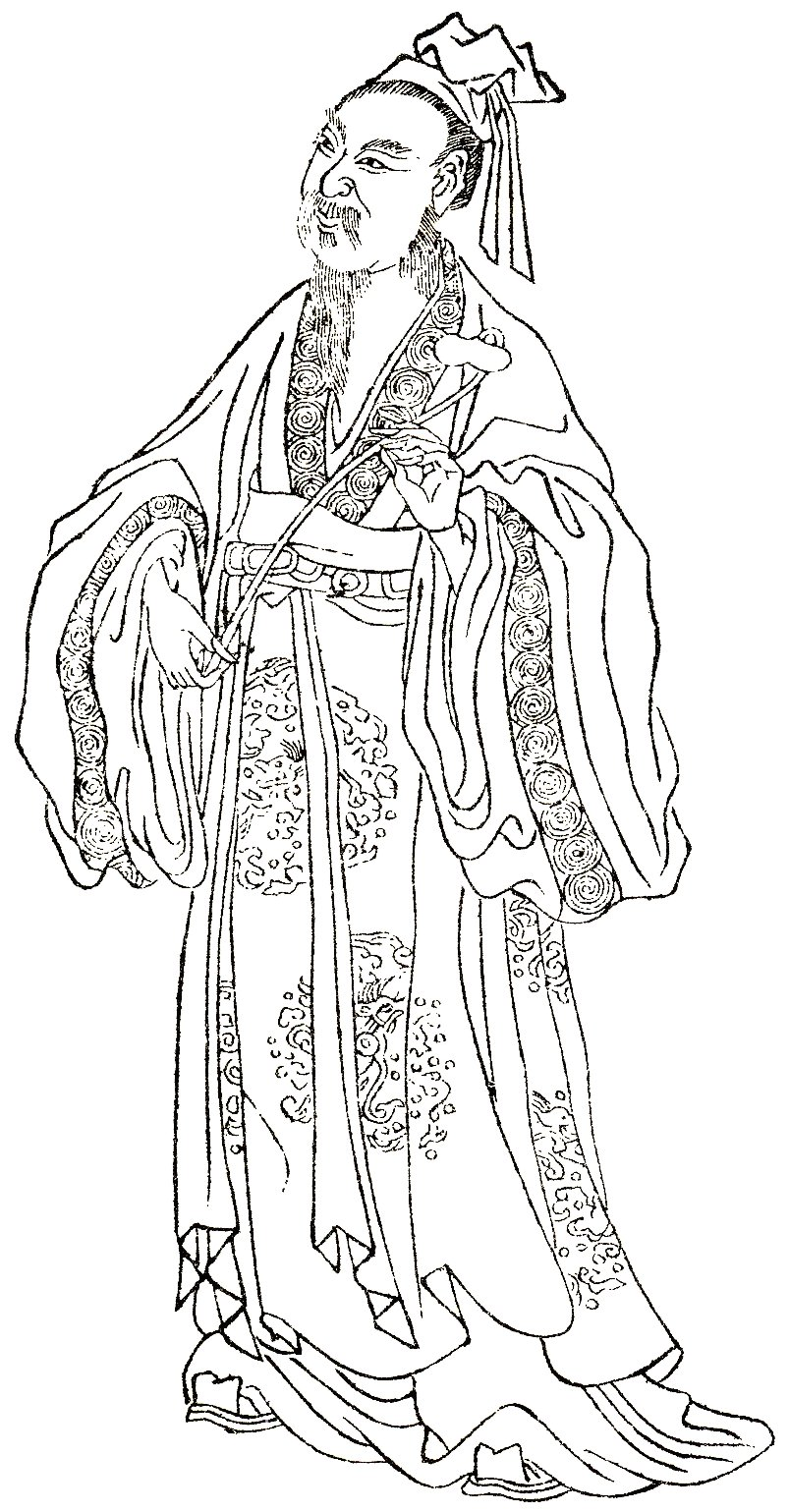
Wang Xizhi depicted in Wanxiaotang huazhuan by Shangguan Zhou, 1743

Around the year 323, (Note: 323 is commonly cited as the year that Wang Xizhi became engaged to Xi Xuan, though other years in the range of 319 to 329 have been suggested as well.) Wang became engaged to Xi Xuan, the eldest daughter of the military general Xi Jian. In a well-known anecdote from the Shishuo xinyu and the Jin shu, Xi Jian sent an emissary to Wang Dao's household to find a suitable husband for his daughter. While the other young men flaunted themselves in fine clothing, an indifferent Wang Xizhi arrived late and sprawled across a bed, with his robes open and belly exposed due to the heat. The emissary was impressed by his spontaneity and reported back to Xi Jian, who agreed to the match. Xi Xuan was also skilled at calligraphy. She and Wang had eight recorded children: seven sons – Xuanzhi, Ningzhi, Huanzhi, Suzhi, Huizhi, Caozhi, and Xianzhi – and one daughter, Mengjiang. Wang Xianzhi, their youngest son, became a renowned calligrapher in his own right, and he and Wang Xizhi were later praised as the "Two Wangs" or "Two Kings" (二王).

=== Political career ===
Wang Xizhi was appointed to various government positions between 324 and 354. He started as an assistant in the Palace Library, and c. 327 he served as a companion and mentor to the future Emperor Jianwen of Jin. Around the year 334, he became the military aide to the general Yu Liang, who later praised him as "pure and noble, a man with discriminating judgment". Wang was named governor of Linchuan (present-day Linchuan, Jiangxi) in 336. After declining several offers from Wang Dao to serve in the Department of Personnel, he became the regional inspector of Jiangzhou (near present-day Huangmei County, Hubei) and received the title of "General Who Brings Repose to the Distance" c. 342. In 346, he was reluctantly persuaded by his friend Yin Hao to accept the appointment of "General Who Defends the Army".

He then requested an appointment as the administrator of Xuancheng (present-day Xuancheng, Anhui), so that he could focus on his cultural interests in a remote area, away from dynastic politics. He was instead appointed administrator of Kuaiji (present-day Shaoxing, Zhejiang), and moved there with his family in 347. That same year, he received his highest title, youjun jiangjun (右軍將軍; "General of the Right Army"). Because of this title, he later received the nickname "Wang Youjun" (王右軍). Despite his military titles, Wang disliked war, never engaged in warfare himself, and often tried to prevent armed conflicts. He unsuccessfully attempted to convince Yin Hao, who was in a fierce rivalry with the ambitious general Huan Wen, to abandon his plans to lead an army into northern China; Yin Hao's expeditions ultimately ended in failure.

=== Orchid Pavilion Gathering ===
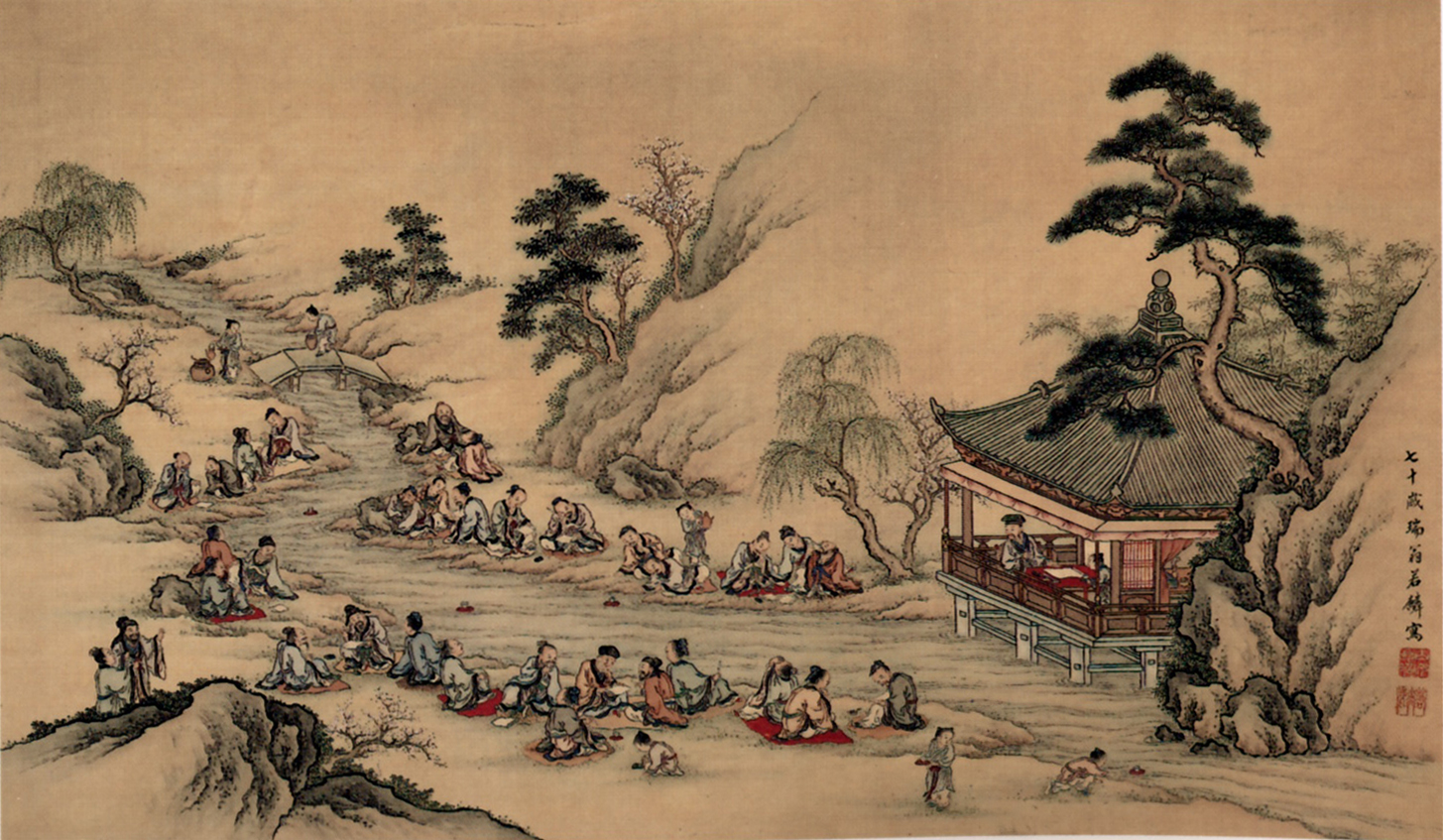
Winding Stream at Lanting by Yamamoto Jakurin, 1790

On 22 April 353, Wang hosted 41 of his friends, relatives, and pupils at the Orchid Pavilion on Mount Kuaiji for the Double Third Festival, which was celebrated annually on the third day of the third month of the Chinese calendar. Originating as a spring purification ritual, the festival became popular among scholars who gathered each year to discuss philosophical topics, compose poetry, and drink rice wine.

Wang's gathering included six of his sons (Xuanzhi, Ningzhi, Huanzhi, Suzhi, Huizhi, and Xianzhi), as well as Xie An, Sun Chuo, and the Buddhist monk Zhi Dun. The participants of the Orchid Pavilion Gathering took part in a "winding stream party", a customary drinking game in which they composed poetry while cups containing rice wine floated down the stream towards them. Those who were able to compose two poems before the cups reached them would have to drink only one cup of wine, whereas those who were unsuccessful had to drink more. The scholars composed a total of 41 poems that day.

The Lantingji xu (蘭亭集序; "Preface to the Poems Composed at the Orchid Pavilion"), the most famous calligraphic work attributed to Wang (though its authenticity has been debated), is a preface to the collection of poems that were written that day. The Orchid Pavilion Gathering has been described as "one of the most famous events in Chinese literary history". It has been depicted in numerous works of art and literature, and features as a prominent theme in paintings from the Song and Ming dynasties in China and the Edo period in Japan.

=== Retirement and later years ===
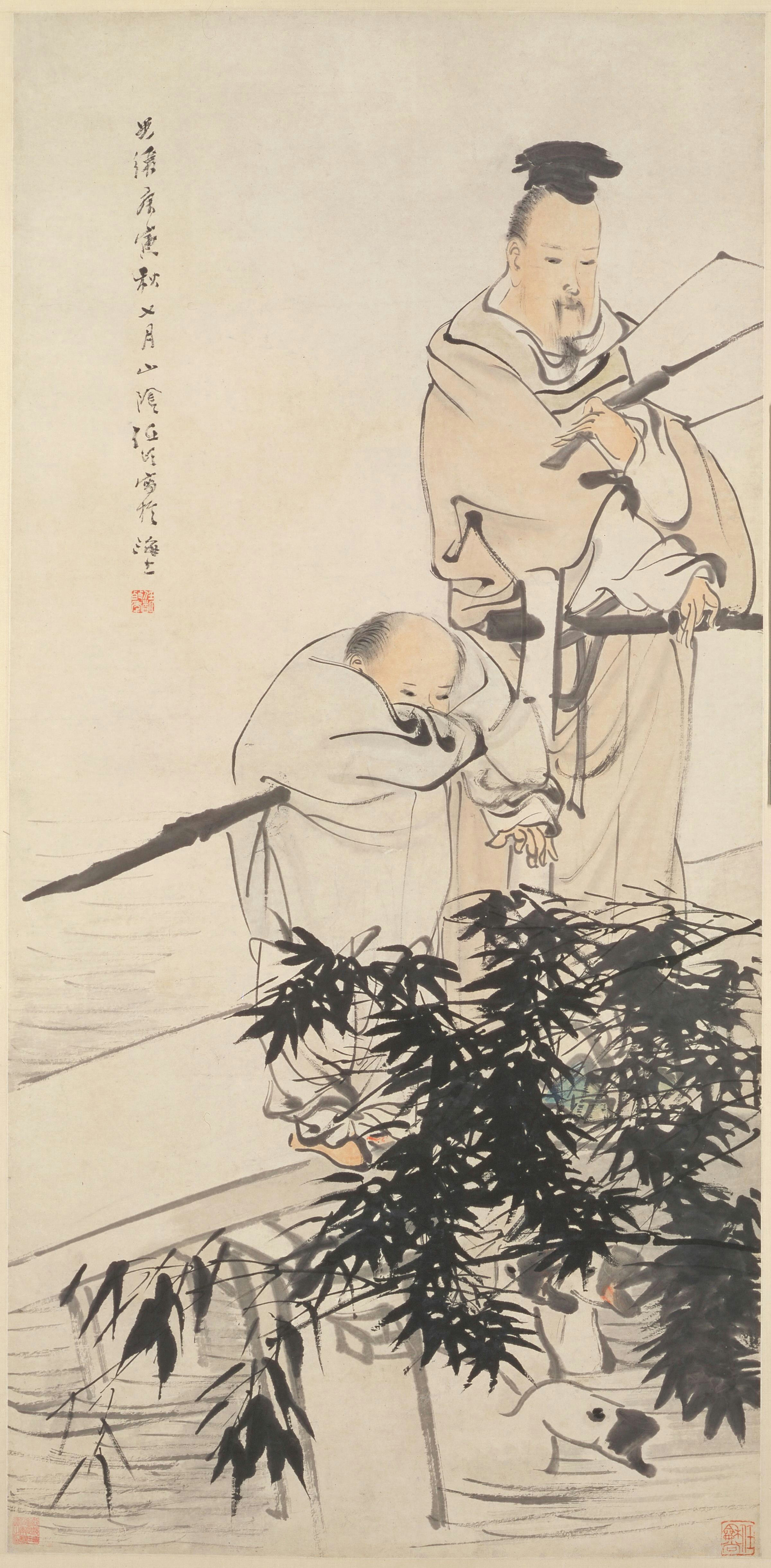
Xizhi's Affection for Geese by Ren Bonian, 1890

In 355, Wang announced that he would resign from governmental service. This decision was precipitated when Wang Shu, a political rival, was appointed regional inspector of Yangzhou and gained oversight of Kuaiji and Wang Xizhi's administration. The two men had personally feuded for many years. Wang Shu subsequently opened an investigation into Kuaiji's finances, alleging that Wang Xizhi had mishandled the collection of taxes in the region. Resolving to leave his position rather than continue working under his new superior, Wang Xizhi retired, citing ill health.

After his retirement, Wang moved to Jinting (present-day Shengzhou, Zhejiang) and devoted himself to Taoist practices. The Wang clan of Langya were well-known adherents of the Way of the Celestial Masters movement of Taoism, and Wang's letters indicate that he was a follower of this movement as well. On one occasion when his granddaughter was ill, he composed a written confession of his own perceived moral failings, believing that these were linked to her illness and that he needed to petition the celestial masters to heal her. He regularly collected medicinal herbs that were believed to grant longevity, and together with his brother-in-law Xi Yin, he practiced bigu (abstinence from cereals). During his lifetime, he transcribed several Taoist texts, including the Huangting jing (黄庭经; "Yellow Court Classic").

Wang died c. 361. Details about the circumstances of his death are unknown, but he had frequently mentioned his poor health in his letters to others. The maladies that were detailed in the letters include fatigue and weakness, insomnia, gastrointestinal issues, chronic pain, and chest discomfort. He sought out many treatments and therapies such as acupuncture, moxibustion, and various medicinal substances, including the psychoactive and toxic Cold-Food Powder which may have exacerbated his symptoms. He has been traditionally believed to be buried in a tomb in Jinting, which has become a major tourist attraction in Shengzhou. Some modern scholarship has suggested that he may have been actually buried in Jiankang (present-day Nanjing, Jiangsu), the capital of the Eastern Jin, alongside other members of his family.

== Calligraphy ==
=== Provenance ===
The first known collector of Wang's calligraphy was Huan Xuan, a Jin dynasty warlord who collected two wrappers (each containing approximately ten scrolls) of works by Wang Xizhi and his son, Wang Xianzhi. Another early collector, Duke Hui, was tricked by dealers who soaked forgeries in dirty water to make them appear older and then sold them as originals. The emperors of the Liu Song dynasty (420–479) were enthusiastic art collectors whose imperial collection included many pieces by the Two Wangs. Emperor Xiaowu obtained ten scrolls of Wang Xizhi's calligraphy from private collectors, but collected many forgeries as well. A violent palace revolt during the reign of Liu Ziye caused the imperial collection to be scattered. His successor, Emperor Ming, reassembled and expanded the collection and tasked an expert calligrapher with cataloguing and authenticating the pieces. In total, 52 wrappers containing 520 scrolls of works by the Two Wangs were documented at the time. Over the next century, emperors continued to acquire new works of calligraphy, reacquire stolen ones, and hire expert authenticators. After Emperor Yuan of Liang reportedly set fire to his collection of 240,000 scrolls as an enemy army was approaching the capital, only about 4,000 scrolls were able to be salvaged from the ashes; it is unknown how many of these were produced by Wang.

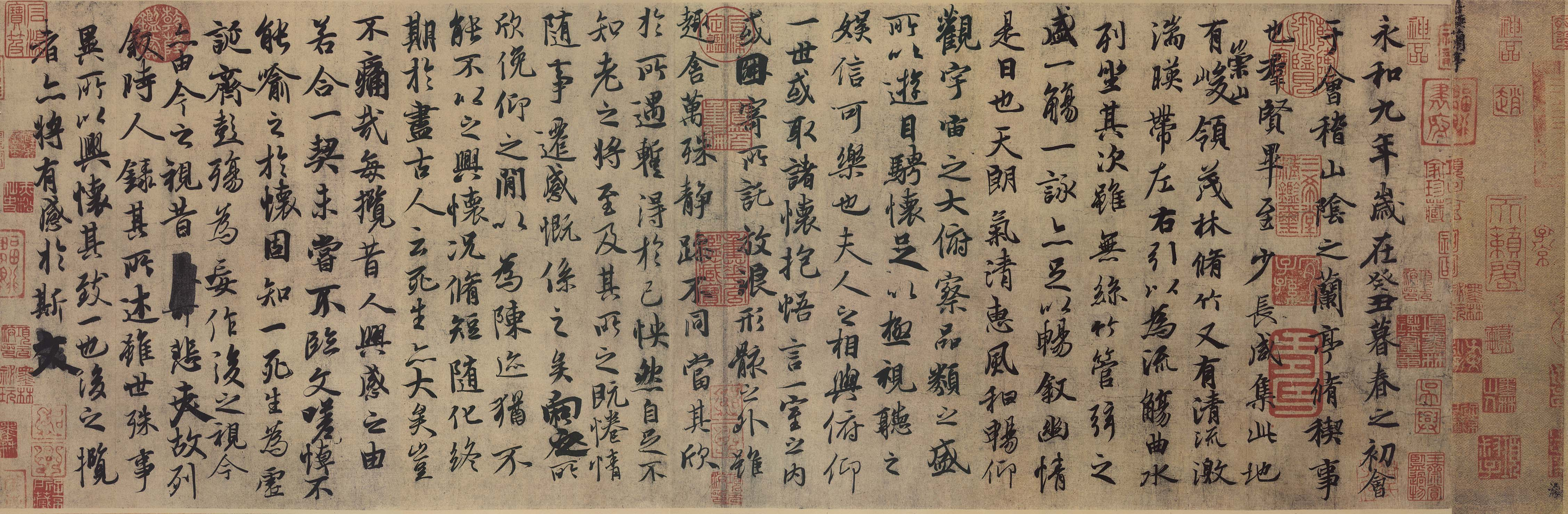
Main text of a Tang dynasty copy of the Lantingji xu, copied by Feng Chengsu, c. 627–650

Emperor Taizong of Tang, a great admirer of Wang, amassed a collection of over 2,000 of his works (including originals and copies) and required that the imperial court scholars study his calligraphic techniques. The emperor was particularly fascinated with the Lantingji xu and went to great lengths to obtain the original, which he ordered to be buried in his mausoleum upon his death. He employed calligraphers to make tracing copies of the Lantingji xu and other works by Wang, using semitransparent tracing paper that was placed over the original versions. They also produced copies using the ink rubbing technique, which involved carving a tracing copy into a stone block, placing a thin sheet of paper over the engraving, and pounding an inkpad onto the surface to transfer the characters to the paper. This process was more efficient than tracing by hand, but it was also less accurate. These reproductions, along with the creation of an imperial office to teach calligraphy to young scholars in the capital, firmly established Wang and his style as the defining standard for Chinese calligraphy. According to the art historian Lothar Ledderose, Emperor Taizong was the "one man who did most for the propagation of the Wang [Xizhi] tradition".

The emperors of the Song dynasty continued to promote reproductions of Wang's calligraphy. Around this time, the "Dingwu stone", an engraving of the Lantingji xu made by Ouyang Xun and widely considered to be most faithful to the original, was discovered in the Hebei province. During the Ming dynasty, Wang's works were mainly promoted by private collectors who accumulated compilation albums of his rubbings. In the present day, there are no known surviving original works by Wang Xizhi. The earliest extant reproductions of his work were produced during the Tang dynasty, including a small number of tracing copies. Numerous rubbings exist – including many copies of the Dingwu stone – but these have likely become less accurate over the centuries as inaccuracies are propagated over time when new engravings are made from older rubbings.

=== Technique and style ===
龍跳天門，虎臥鳳閣。
Dragons leaping at the Gate of Heaven, tigers crouching at the Phoenix Tower.

— Emperor Wu of Liang describing the calligraphy of Wang Xizhi (Note: This eight-character phrase was later inscribed by the Qianlong Emperor as an introduction to Wang's Xingrang tie (行穰帖). According to the art historian Robert E. Harrist Jr., the description "contrasts the realized kinetic force of the dragon in action with the still-latent energy of the crouching tiger".)

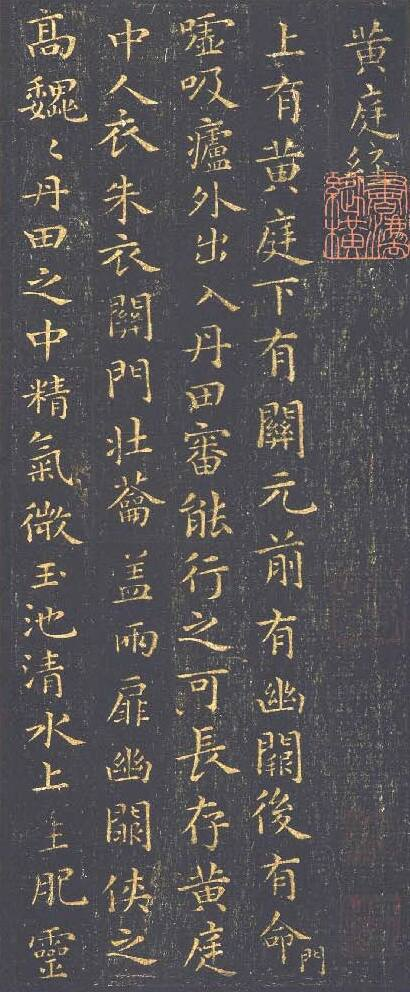
Song dynasty rubbing of the Huangting jing

Wang is known for his proficiency in multiple Chinese script styles, particularly the regular (kaishu), semi-cursive (xingshu), and cursive (caoshu) forms. His calligraphy also contains traces of patterns found in the early seal script (zhuanshu) style, according to an analysis by Dong Qichang, an art theorist and calligrapher of the Ming dynasty who studied the stylistic effects of the brush tip in Wang's works. Although he produced famous works in multiple script styles, he remains best known for his innovations in semi-cursive script, the style of the Lantingji xu. His works vary in length from a few lines to several hundred characters and, apart from the Lantingji xu and his letters to others, are largely copies of existing texts.

A hallmark of Wang's calligraphy, according to the art historian Robert E. Harrist Jr., is the presence of "brushstrokes that are carefully formed and create a sense of disciplined energy flowing down the page", even for text that appears to have been rapidly written. He regularly experimented with varying the speed and direction of the brush, resulting in distinctive visual characteristics in different instances of recurring strokes. In the Lantingji xu, for instance, characters that are repeated have different visual forms, creating a sense of spontaneity that reflects the scene during which it was written. In contrast to the relatively wide characters typically seen in clerical script (lishu), Wang's characters were more vertically elongated and compact.

The study of Wang's style is challenged by the lack of surviving original works. In debating the differences between Wang's calligraphy and archaeological texts produced by other writers around the same time period, some scholars have questioned the relative influence of Wang versus the Tang calligraphers who copied his pieces. Ledderose observes that the works attributed to Wang vary widely in style, precision, and balance, making a "correct assessment of his personal contribution quite difficult".

==== Representative works ====
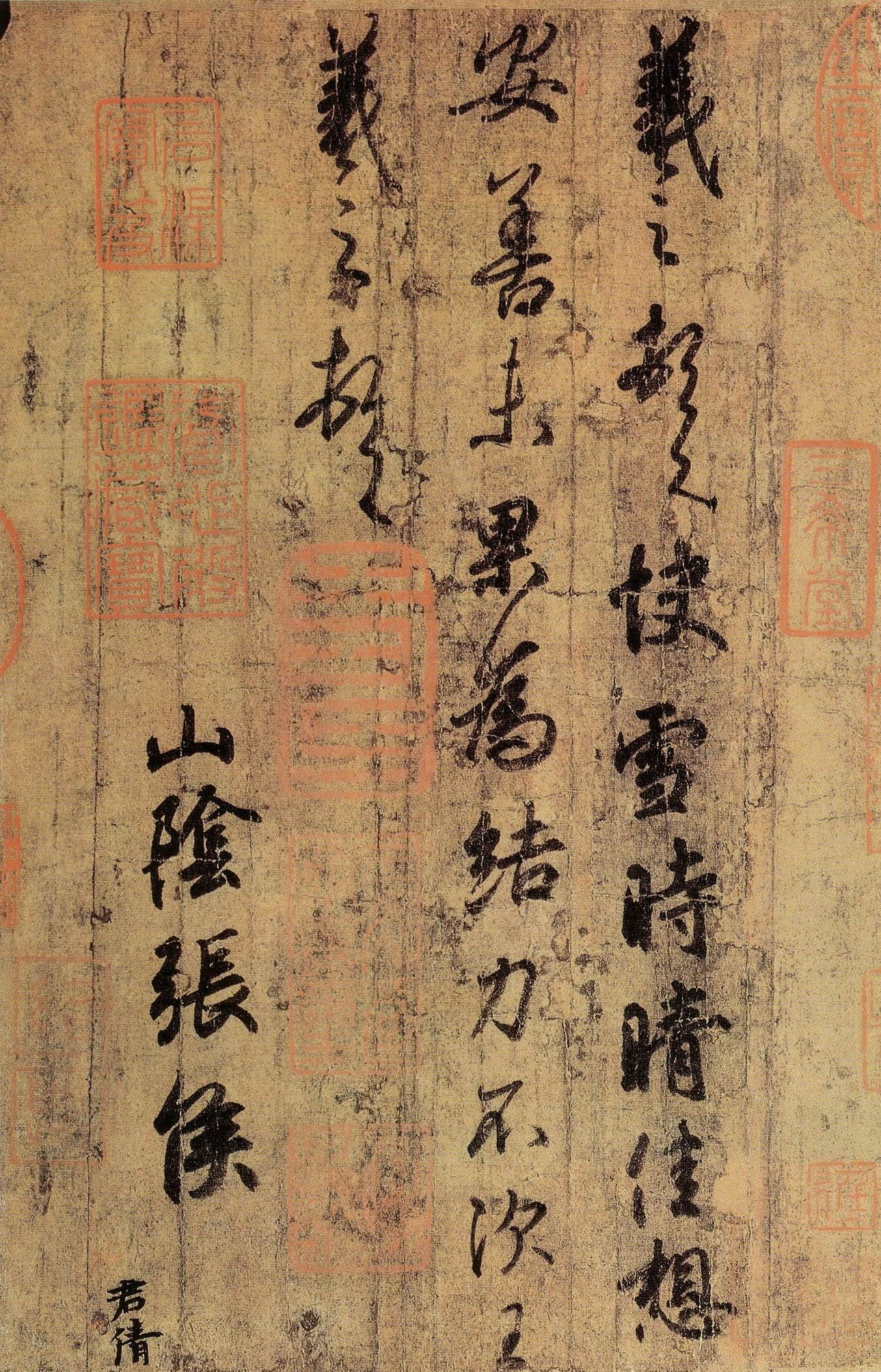
Tang dynasty copy of the Kuaixue shiqing tie

Written in regular script:

- Yue Yi lun (樂毅論; "Essay on Yue Yi"): a transcription of an essay authored by Xiahou Xuan about Yue Yi, a military general during the Warring States period. Copied by Wang in 348, it is generally regarded as the best example of his regular script.
- Huangting jing (黄庭经; "Yellow Court Classic"): a transcription of a Taoist text describing methods of meditation. There are two versions of this text; the shorter one (Huangting waijing jing) was copied by Wang in 356.
- Dongfang Shuo huazan (东方朔画贊; "Eulogy to a Portrait of Dongfang Shuo"): a transcription of a text authored by the poet Xiaohou Chen about a portrait of Dongfang Shuo, a court jester of the Han dynasty. Wang's original copy, written in 356, was reportedly buried in the tomb of his relative, Wang Xiu.

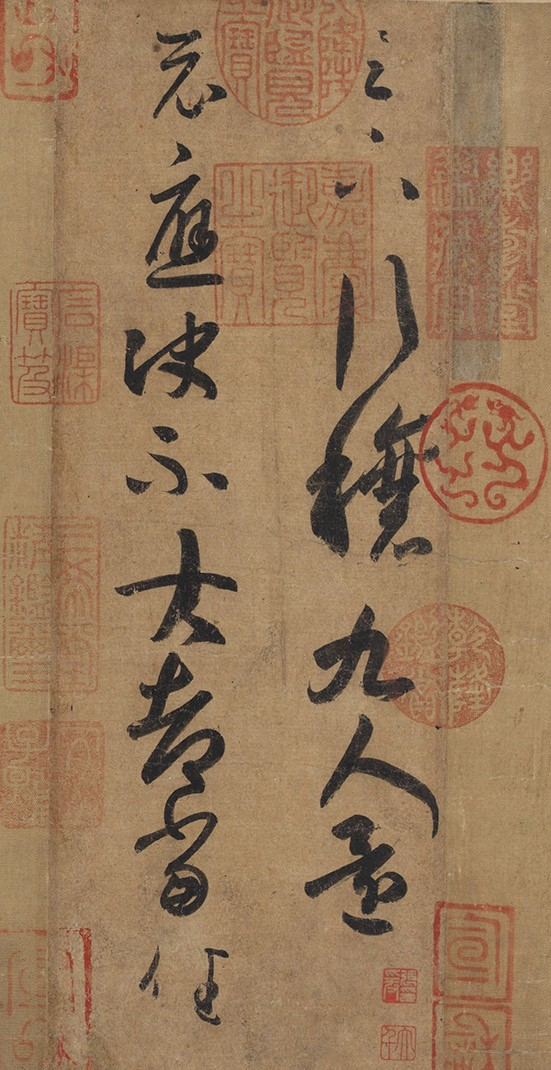
Tang dynasty copy of the Xingrang tie

Written in semi-cursive script:

- Lantingji xu (蘭亭集序; "Preface to the Poems Composed at the Orchid Pavilion"): Wang's most celebrated work of calligraphy, composed in 353 at the Orchid Pavilion Gathering.
- Sangluan tie (喪亂帖; "Letter of Distress and Indignation"): a letter from Wang expressing despair that he is unable to mourn at his ancestors' tombs in the conquered north. Records indicate that a tracing copy was preserved in the Japanese imperial household and donated to the Shōsōin treasure house in the 8th century.
- Kong shizhong tie (孔侍中帖; "Letter to Kong"): a letter from Wang asking about the well-being of one of his friends. Like the Sangluan tie, a tracing copy of this letter was among a Japanese imperial collection of Wang's calligraphy that was later donated to the Shōsōin.
- Kuaixue shiqing tie (快雪時晴帖; "Sudden Clearing after a Lively Snowfall"): a letter from Wang addressed to a "Marquis of Zhang" in which he remarks on the clear weather.
- Fengju tie (奉橘帖; "Letter on Presenting Oranges"): a letter from Wang to a friend to accompany a gift of 300 oranges. (Note: English translation of the letter: "I present three hundred oranges. Frost has not yet fallen. I cannot get any more.") It is Wang's shortest known letter, comprising 12 characters.
- Xingrang tie (行穰帖; "Ritual to Pray for Good Harvest"): a 15-character fragment of a letter from Wang. Though the art historian Zhang Yanyuan identified the second half of the letter containing the remaining 17 characters, the meaning of the letter is still unclear. Wang appears to reference a ritual or ceremony involving the addressee and nine others. The Xingrang tie is the only tracing copy of Wang's calligraphy held in a Western collection (the Princeton University Art Museum).

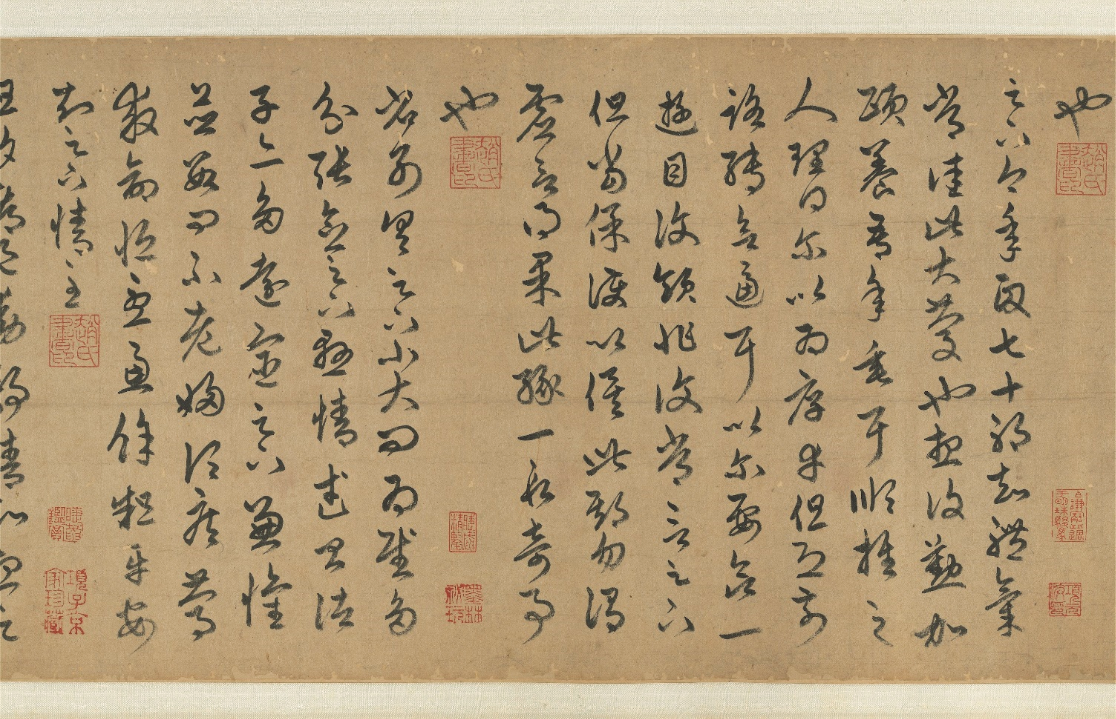
Detail from Yuan dynasty copy of the Shiqi tie

Written in cursive script:

- Shiqi tie (十七贴; "Seventeen Posts"): a collection of 29 letters from Wang that were reportedly later engraved during the Tang dynasty. The name of the collection is derived from the first two characters in the opening letter.
- Wanglue tie (王略帖; "National Territory"): a letter from Wang that was later owned by Mi Fu, a calligrapher of the Song dynasty, who treasured it and described it as "the foremost [writing] in existence".

=== Debates on authenticity ===
The complicated textual history of Wang's calligraphy has led to debates over the authenticity of his works, primarily the Lantingji xu. During the Song dynasty, the poets Jiang Kui and Lu You began to question the authenticity of the preface. Several centuries later, some scholars of the Qing dynasty rejected the claim that Wang produced the Lantingji xu based on arguments that it did not include characters written in clerical script, that its semi-cursive script may not have been developed until after Wang's lifetime, and that it was inconsistent with another recorded version, the Linhe xu (臨河序; "Preface to the Riverbank Gathering"). They instead hypothesized that it was written by a later calligrapher of the Sui or Tang dynasties, but this was a minority view at the time.

During the 1960s, the question of the Lantingji xu's authenticity was revived by Guo Moruo, the chairman of the Chinese Academy of Sciences and the China Federation of Literary and Art Circles. Guo published an article in 1965 rejecting Wang's authorship based on the recent discovery of tombs from the Jin dynasty whose inscriptions were written in clerical script. Guo also presented the argument that portions of the Lantingji xu, which somberly reflect on the transience of life, were inconsistent with the celebratory nature of the Orchid Pavilion Gathering. He suggested that it was actually written by Zhiyong, a Buddhist monk who was a descendant of Wang. In the wake of the Socialist Education Movement, few scholars were willing to publicly challenge Guo's claims, and those who did were attacked by Guo and his political allies in the Chinese Communist Party.

He Jianjun, a scholar of Chinese history, wrote that Guo's motivation for challenging the authenticity of the Lantingji xu was political, not academic, and that Guo was deliberately trying to subvert "the single most important Chinese work of art of past millennia", usher in the Cultural Revolution, and establish his own authority in cultural debates. These debates over Wang's calligraphy subsided after 1966 as critics shifted their focus to other works such as Hai Rui Dismissed from Office. Guo's claim that clerical script would have been used exclusively during Wang's lifetime was weakened in 1988 upon the discovery of an Eastern Jin tomb with an inscription written in regular script.

== Legacy ==
=== Posthumous reputation ===
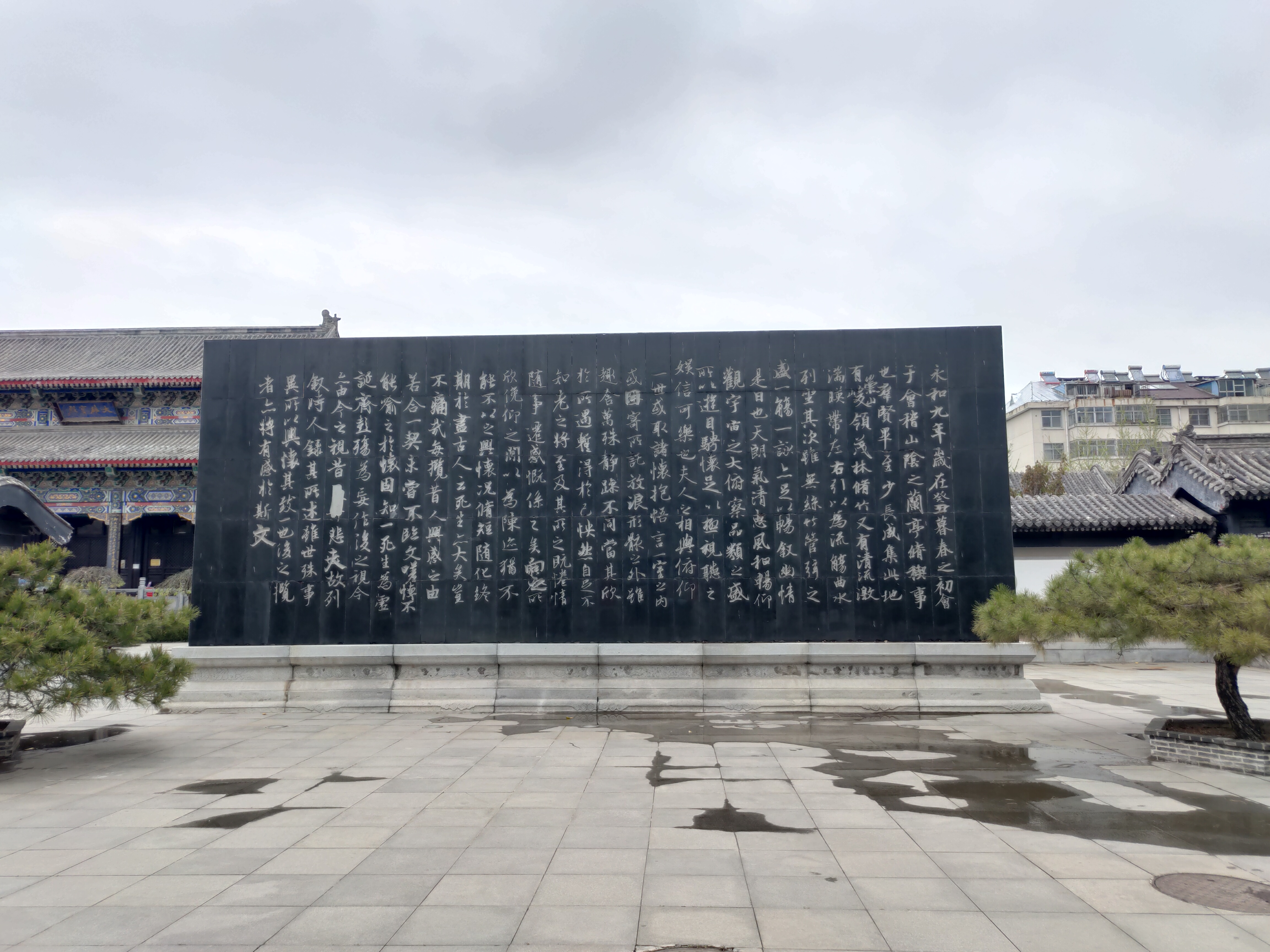
Monument to Wang's calligraphy in Linyi

Wang's works were already popular during his lifetime, and in the centuries after Wang's death, collectors continued to seek out his calligraphy. The value of an imperial collection was often judged by the number of works written by the Two Wangs. As Wang Xizhi's works were the most valuable part of the collection, they surpassed "their aesthetic value and function as a symbol of power". Thus, emperors continually sought to expand their collection of Wang's calligraphy in order to strengthen their own perceived legitimacy. Around the time of the Tang dynasty, he was designated the "Sage of Calligraphy" (書聖; shu sheng), a title that is still used to describe him in the present day.

As a result of Emperor Taizong's patronage, Wang is generally considered to be the most significant Chinese calligrapher in history. The Lantingji xu, according to Ledderose, is "the most celebrated piece of calligraphy of all time", admired for both its calligraphy and its text. He is an influential figure in Japanese calligraphy as well. After his calligraphy was established as the defining model in China during the Tang dynasty, it was transmitted to Japan during the Nara and Heian periods. In the 9th and 10th centuries, the Heian court standardized Wang's semi-cursive and cursive scripts and these were copied by Japanese calligraphers, resulting in a distinctive Japanese style of that time period. Extant tracing copies of Wang's work, which are rare, continue to be highly valued. In 2010, a scroll with four lines of Wang's calligraphy, copied during the Tang dynasty, was sold at a China Guardian auction in Beijing for CN¥ 308 million (US$46 million).

Several locations associated with Wang's life have become visitor attractions in China. The site of his childhood residence in Linyi is open to tourists and features an "ink pond" where he reportedly washed his brush while writing. In Shaoxing, the site of the Orchid Pavilion contains a stone engraving of the Lantingji xu and receives over one million visitors annually, and his tomb is popular with visitors as well. The Tishan Bridge (题扇桥; Tishan qiao; lit. 'fan-writing bridge') in Shaoxing is named after an anecdote in which Wang took pity on a struggling vendor and inscribed her fans with his calligraphy to increase their value. The fans were easily sold and the old woman reapproached Wang with even more fans, but he declined to sign them and slipped out through a side door.

=== Depictions in art ===
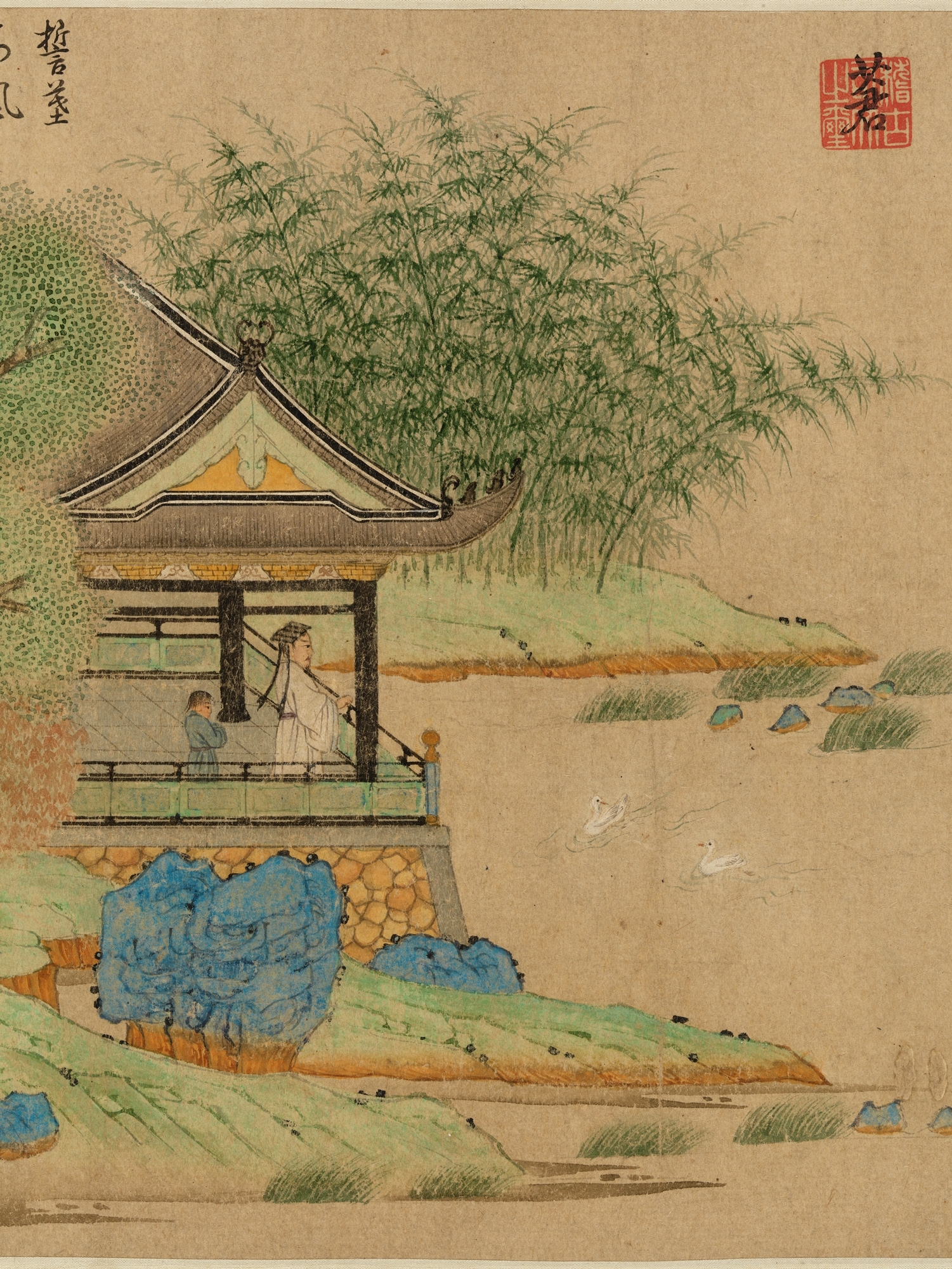
Detail from Wang Xizhi Watching Geese by Qian Xuan, c. 1295

According to an anecdote from the Jin shu, Wang once received ten live geese in exchange for transcribing two chapters from the Tao Te Ching, a foundational Taoist text. After his lifetime, art theorists such as Guo Xi continued to associate him with geese, creating the narrative that his calligraphic brush technique was inspired by the way that the geese moved their necks. Wang's fondness for geese "has come to be the emblem of his artistic personality in popular and elite imagination alike", and his depictions in art typically show him in the presence of geese. A 14th-century rubbing of a painting from the Song dynasty is the earliest known depiction of Wang with geese. A well-known painting, Wang Xizhi Watching Geese by Qian Xuan, was painted c. 1295 and is housed in the Metropolitan Museum of Art.

Though the Orchid Pavilion Gathering in 353 did not involve geese, artists have often combined the two themes in their paintings of Wang. According to the art historian Kazuko Kameda-Madar, the gathering itself is "one of the most important painting themes in the cultural history of East Asia". Over time, Chinese and Japanese artists have added other recurring elements to their depictions of the Orchid Pavilion Gathering not mentioned in the Lantingji xu, such as saucers in the shape of lotus leaves to carry the goblets of rice wine down the stream and the presence of a young boy stealing a sip of wine.
