= Zhubao railway station =

Railway station in Linyi, Shandong

Zhubao 朱保

General information
- Location: Lanshan District, Linyi, Shandong; China
- Coordinates: 35°7′28.01″N 118°10′43.91″E
- Lines: Yanzhou–Shijiusuo railway; Zaozhuang–Linyi railway
Location

Zhubao railway station (Chinese: 朱保站) is a freight-only railway station in Lanshan District, Linyi, Shandong, China. It is on the Yanzhou–Shijiusuo railway, and is the eastern terminus of the Zaozhuang–Linyi railway.

== History ==
Construction on a new freight terminal began in October 2016. The first phase of the expanded terminal was put into use in 2018.
