= Harrist =

Harrist is a surname. Notable people with the surname include:

- Earl Harrist (1919–1998), American baseball player
- Robert E. Harrist (born 1951), American art historian
