= Linyi railway station =

Railway station in Linyi, Shandong

Coordinates: 35.0372°N 118.3383°E

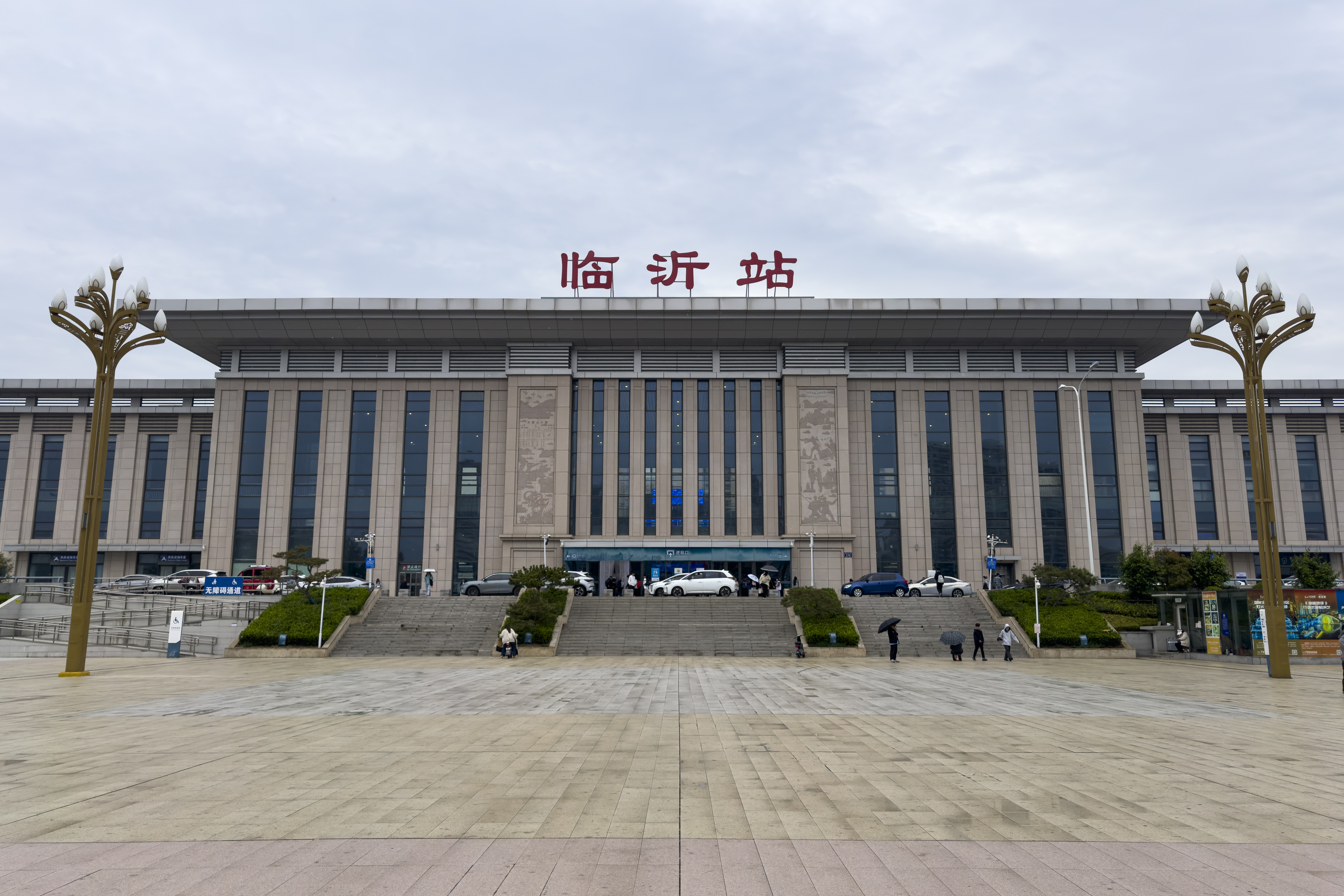
Facade of Linyi railway station

Linyi railway station is a second-class railway station in Lanshan District, Linyi, Shandong. It is on the Yanzhou–Shijiusuo railway and Jiaozhou–Xinyi railway. It is under the jurisdiction of China Railway Jinan Group.

== See also ==
- Linyi North railway station
- Linyi East railway station

| Preceding station | China Railway | Following station |
|---|---|---|
| Feixian towards Yanzhou | Yanzhou–Shijiusuo railway | Junan towards Rizhao |
