= Linyi East railway station =

Railway station in Linyi, Shandong, China

Linyi East 临沂东站
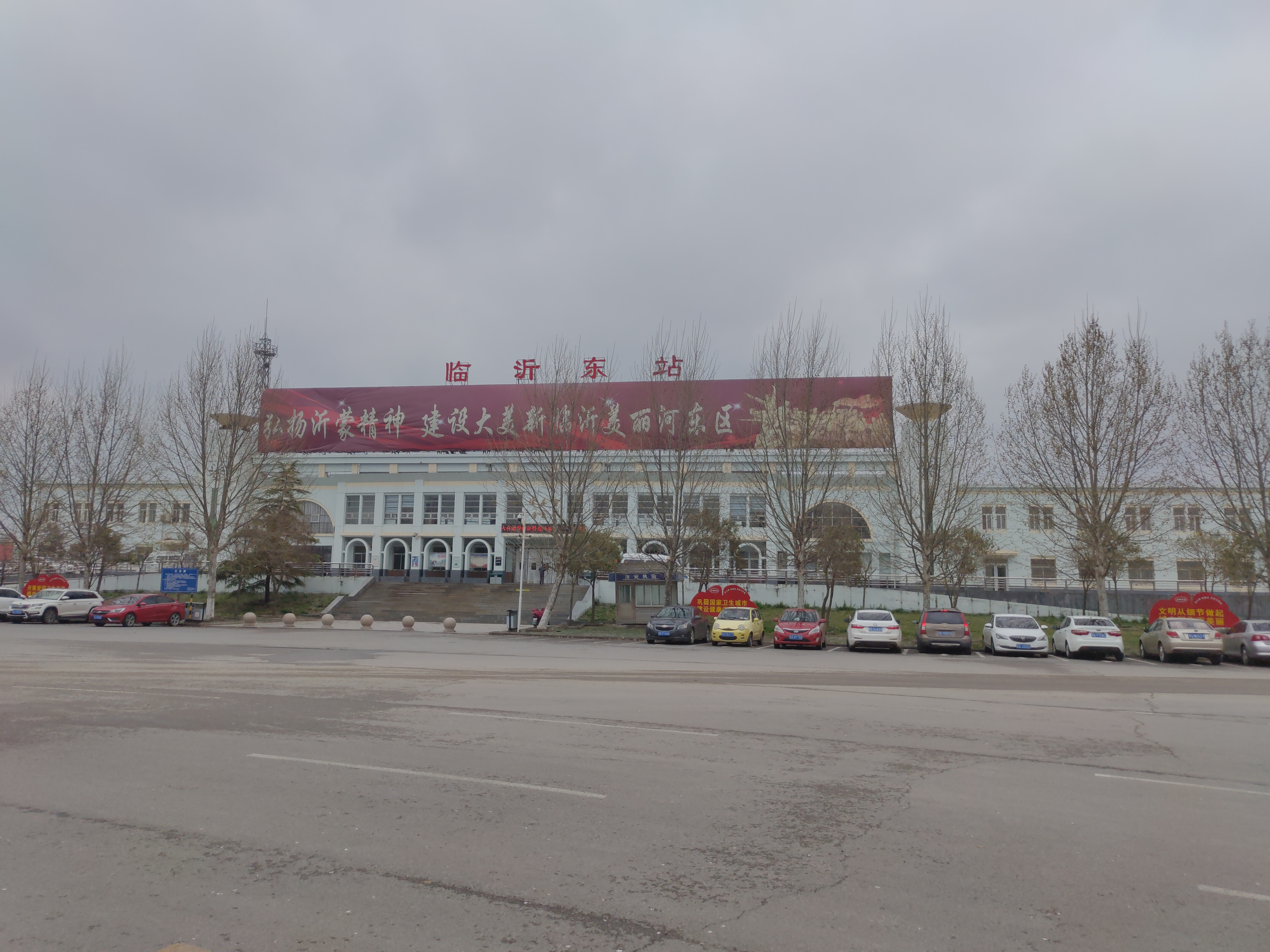

General information
- Location: Fanggudun Village, Xianggong Subdistrict, Hedong District, Linyi, Shandong, China; China
- System: Railway station
- Owner: China Railway
- Operator: China Railway Jinan Group
- Line: Jiaozhou–Xinyi railway

History
- Opened: 2003
- Former names: Linyi North (before 1 December 2018)
Location
- Location within Shandong

Linyi East railway station is a railway station in Fanggudun Village, Xianggong Subdistrict, Hedong District, Linyi, Shandong. It is on the Jiaozhou–Xinyi railway. It was opened in 2003. It is under the jurisdiction of China Railway Jinan Group.

This railway station was formerly known as Linyi North. It was renamed Linyi East on 1 December 2018. The name Linyi North was subsequently reused for a station on the new Rizhao–Lankao high-speed railway.

== See also ==
- Linyi railway station
- Linyi North railway station

Preceding station	China Railway	Following station
Yinan towards Jiaozhou	Jiaozhou–Xinyi railway	Tancheng towards Xinyi
