= Yellow Court Classic =

Taoist meditative text

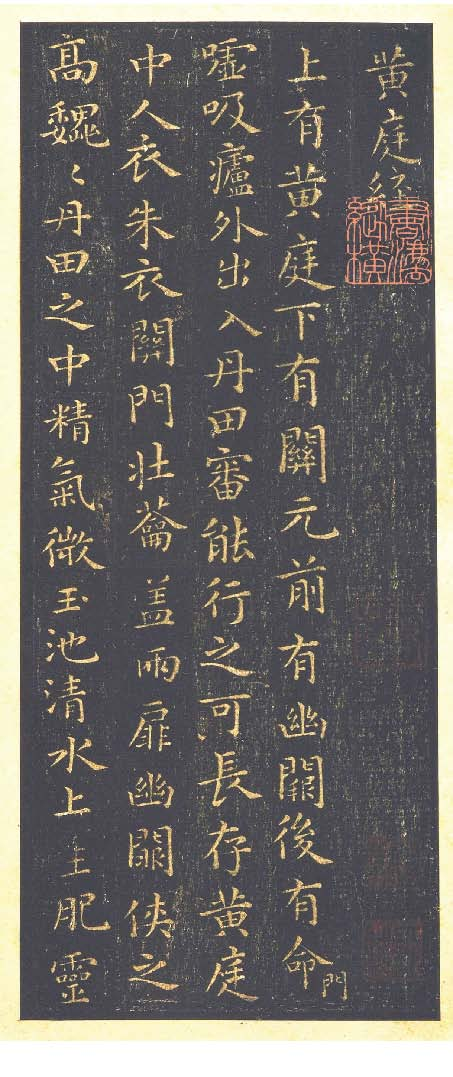
Part of a Song Dynasty stone rubbing of Wang Xizhi's manuscript of the Yellow Court Classic

The Yellow Court Classic (simplified Chinese: 黄庭经; pinyin: Huángtíng-jīng), a Chinese Daoist meditation text, was received from an unknown source by Wei Huacun, one of the founders of the Shangqing School (Chinese: 上清), in 288 CE. The first reference to the text appears in the archives of the famous alchemist and collector of Daoist texts, Ge Hong, in the 4th century.

== Structure and content ==
The manuscript comprises two parts, the External (Wai, 外) and Internal (Nei, 内) Scenery Scripture. All characters of the shorter (100 verses) text of the External Scripture are fully contained in the longer (435 verses) text of the Internal Scripture. Together, both of the texts are also referred to (within the manuscript itself) as "Jade Book" or "Jade Writing". The fourth century “Sage of Calligraphy”, Wang Xizhi, presented the full text of the Internal Scenery Scripture of the Yellow Court on the stone tables in his classic artwork, a well-known masterpiece of the Chinese calligraphy .

The literal meaning of the “Yellow Court” refers to the central area of the Emperor’s Castle where the Emperor and Ministers gather to try to understand the will of the Heavens and properly regulate the businesses of the Kingdom. Yellow indicates the Earth element that is central in the Five Element arrangement. The four sides of the Castle Architecture symbolize the other four elements (Metal, Water, Wood and Fire), while the Heaven symbolizes the Spirit. The overall picture presents an allegory to harmony between the human body, particularly the spleen (yellow, of the Earth element, central of the Five Organs) which is associated with the lower reservoir of qi in the body.

The text of the Yellow Court scriptures provides meditation instructions for the practitioner’s alignment with the Universe and its Spiritual Laws and Forces (symbolized by “Heaven”) to regulate and improve functions and processes of the body (symbolized by “Kingdom”). Such Life Cultivation, or Internal Alchemy work should, according to the text, result in the enhanced health and longevity of a diligent practitioner.

Carl Jung referred to this mechanism, including in his commentary of The Secret of the Golden Flower, as Individuation. However, in addition to the psychological aspect analyzed by Jung, the Daoist alchemy process also emphasizes energetic and physical changes in the practitioner’s body, as the components of holistic personal enhancement.

The key component in the meditative practice of The Yellow Court Classic is, however, focused on the cooperation with shen or spirits, which are assumed to form the “intelligent”, organizational aspects of human existence. In addition to the specific locations in the body (like lungs, kidneys, liver, heart, spleen etc.), the nature and mission of these, personified, spirits are designated by color, material and shape of the clothes they wear. The colors usually indicate one of the Five Elements; for instance, “red” is associated with the Heart and the Fire element. The other attributes of the spirits are symbolically associated with the concepts of yin and yang, the Bagua of the Yijing, etc. The text of the scripture gradually develops a systematic description of main body elements and functions, as aspects of the Universal Spiritual Harmony in the Human Being.

== History ==
Since the fourth century, this classic visualization text has been regularly used in the practice of the Highest Purity (also called Supreme Purity) lineage, as well as the other schools of Taoism. Lü Dongbin, a historical figure also honored in Chinese folklore as a xian or Immortal, had integrated the material from The Yellow Court Classic into his practice and referenced some parts in his scripture, The Secret of the Golden Flower, which has been later translated by Thomas Cleary and Richard Wilhelm with commentary by Carl Jung. This version is not well translated and is based on a truncated Chinese text.

== Sources ==
- Andersen, Paul, The Method of Handling the Three Ones: A Taoist Manual of Meditation of the Fourth Century A.D., Curzon Press, 1980
- Balfour, Frederick, Taoist Texts: Ethical, Political and Specultative, Tribner and Co./Kelly and Walsh, 1894
- Imios Archangelis, Miaoyu Lanying, Jade Writing (Yellow Court Classic), Createspace, 2010
- Lu Dong Bin, Richard Wilhelm, Carl Gustav Jung, The Secret of the Golden Flower, A Harvest HBJ Book 1962
- Robinet, Isabelle. Daoism: Growth of a Religion, translated by Phyllis Brooks. Stanford: Stanford University Press, 1997.
- Wong, Eva. Teachings of the Tao. Boston: Shambhala, 1997.
- Fabrizio Pregadio. The Golden Elixir Blog, https://blog.goldenelixir.com/
