= Semi-cursive script =

Style of writing Chinese characters

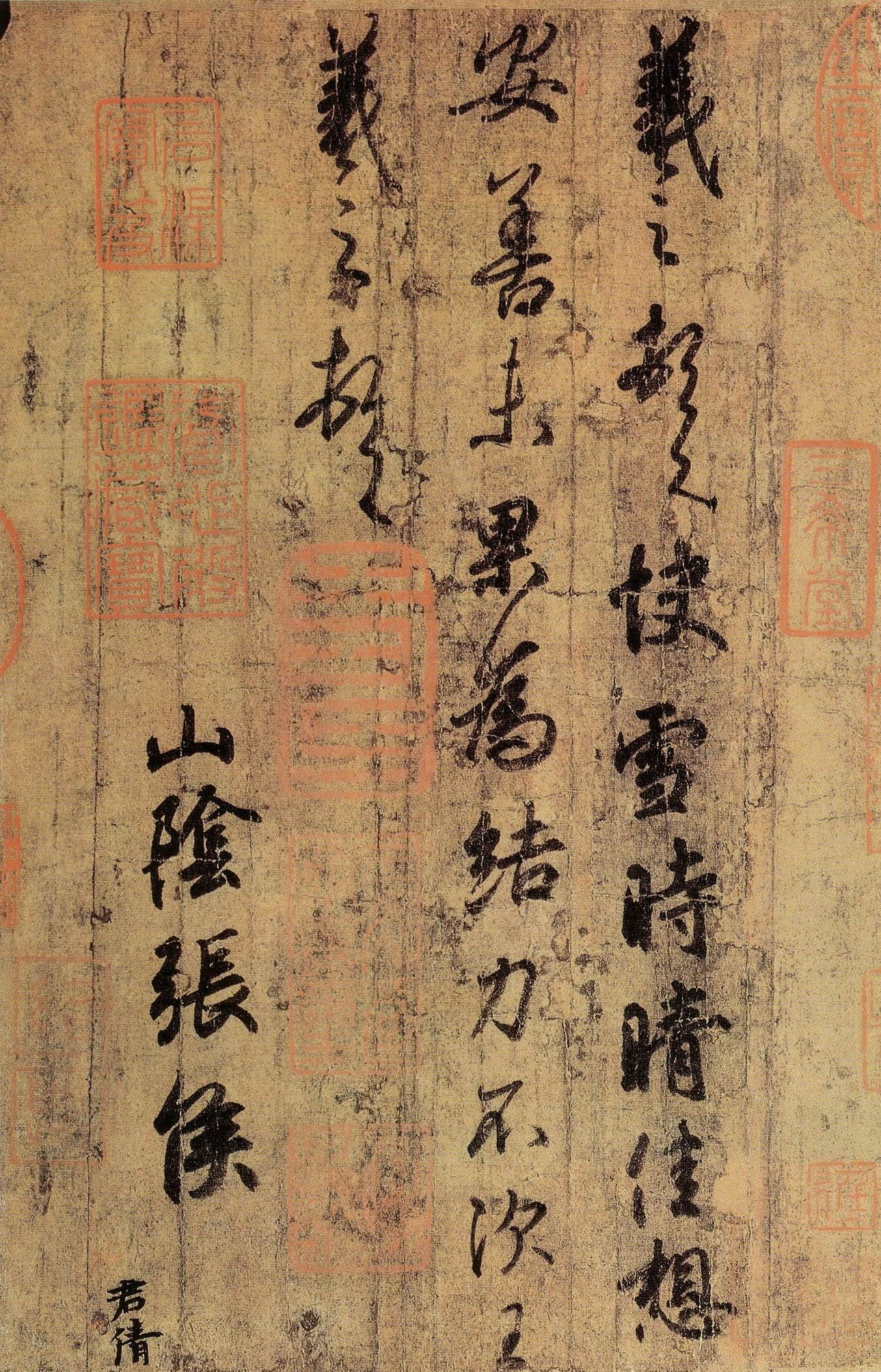
- Kuaixue shiqing tie by Wang Xizhi
- Script type: Logographic
- Period: Han dynasty to present
- Languages: Chinese, Vietnamese, Japanese, Korean

Related scripts
- Parent systems: Oracle bone script: Seal script; Clerical script; Cursive script; Semi-cursive script
- Child systems: Regular script

Semi-cursive script
- "Semi-cursive script" written in regular script (left) and semi-cursive script (right).

Chinese name
- Traditional Chinese: 行書
- Simplified Chinese: 行书
- Literal meaning: running script
Transcriptions
Standard Mandarin
- Hanyu Pinyin: xíngshū
- Bopomofo: ㄒㄧㄥˊ ㄕㄨ
Wu
- Romanization: ghaon^{平} sy^{平}
Hakka
- Romanization: hang^{11} su^{24}
Yue: Cantonese
- Jyutping: hang4 syu1
Southern Min
- Hokkien POJ: hâng-su
Middle Chinese
- Middle Chinese: /ɦˠæŋ.ɕɨʌ/

Vietnamese name
- Vietnamese alphabet: hành thư; chữ hành
- Hán-Nôm: 行書; 𡨸行

Korean name
- Hangul: 행서
- Hanja: 行書
Transcriptions
- Revised Romanization: haengseo

Japanese name
- Kanji: 行書
- Kana: ぎょうしょ
Transcriptions
- Romanization: gyōsho

Semi-cursive script, also known as running script, is a style of Chinese calligraphy that emerged during the Han dynasty (202 BC – 220 AD). The style is used to write Chinese characters and is abbreviated slightly where a character's strokes are permitted to be visibly connected as the writer writes, but not to the extent of the cursive style. This makes the style easily readable by readers who can read regular script and quickly writable by calligraphers who require ideas to be written down quickly. In order to produce legible work using the semi-cursive style, a series of writing conventions is followed, including the linking of the strokes, simplification and merging strokes, adjustments to stroke order and the distribution of text of the work.

One of the most notable calligraphers who used this style was Wang Xizhi (303–361). Wang is known for the Lantingji Xu ('Preface to the Orchid Pavilion Collection'), a work published in 353 which remains highly influential to calligraphers throughout the Sinosphere. Semi-cursive script is prominent in modern Chinese society despite the lack of official education for it, a status aided by the introduction of fountain pens.

== History ==
The Chinese writing system has been borrowed and used in East Asian countries, including Japan, Korea and Vietnam for thousands of years due to China's extensive influence, technology and large territory. As a result, the culture of calligraphy and its various styles spread across the region, including semi-cursive script.

=== China ===
The semi-cursive style was developed in the Han dynasty. Script in this style is written in a more curvaceous style than the regular script, however not as illegible as the cursive script.

One of the most notable calligraphers to produce work using the semi-cursive style is Wang Xizhi, where his work Preface to the Orchid Pavilion Collection was written in 353 AD. The work included the character 之, a possessive particle, twenty-one times all in different forms. The difference in form was generated by Wang under the influence of having alcohol with his acquaintances. He had wanted to reproduce the work again since it was in his liking, but to no avail. Preface to the Orchid Pavilion Collection is still included in some of the world's most notable calligraphy works and remains highly influential in the calligraphy world.

The semi-cursive style was also the basis of the techniques used to write with the fountain pen when Western influence was heavy in China, in the early 20th century. Although it is not officially taught to students, the style has proceeded to become the most popular Chinese script in modern times. In the digital age, it has been proposed to encode Chinese characters using the "track and point set" method, which allows users to make their own personalized semi-cursive fonts.

=== Japan ===
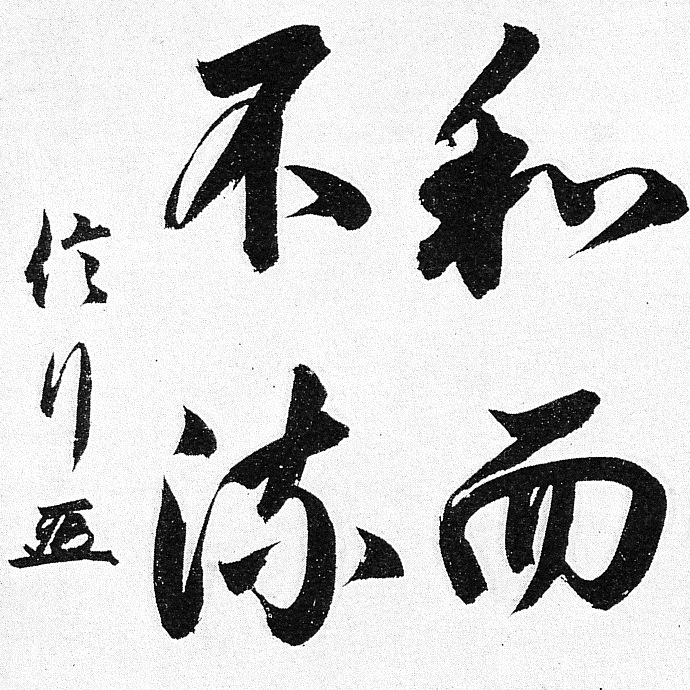
Japanese calligraphy written in the semi-cursive style.

Calligraphy culture from China was introduced to Japan in around AD 600 and has been practiced up to the modern day. Although Japan originally used Chinese characters (called kanji in Japanese) to represent words of the spoken language, there were still parts of the spoken language that could not be written using Chinese characters. The phonetic writing systems, hiragana and katakana, were developed as a result of the semi-cursive and cursive styles. During the Heian period, a large number of calligraphy works were written in the semi-cursive style because the roundedness of the style allowed for a natural flow between kanji and hiragana. In the Edo period, general trends have been noticed where semi-cursive was used with hiragana in mixed script for "native" literature and books translated for commoners, while regular script kanji was used alongside katakana for Classical Chinese works meant to be read by scholars.

=== Korea ===
Chinese calligraphy appeared in Korea at around 2nd or 3rd century AD. Korea also used Chinese characters (called hanja in Korean) until the invention of the Korean alphabet, hangul, in 1443. Even then, many calligraphers did not choose to use the newly created hangul writing system and continued to write calligraphy and its various styles using Chinese characters. In this environment, semi cursive script started seeing use in Korea during the Joseon dynasty.

== Characteristics ==
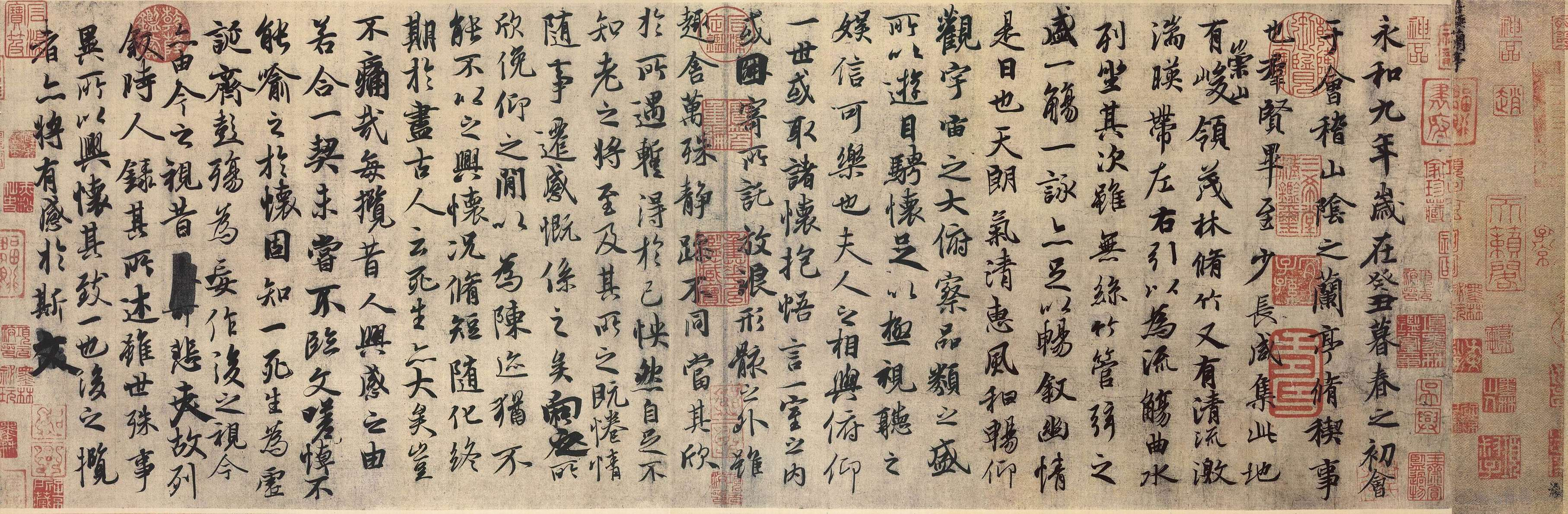
Traced copy of the "Preface to the Orchard Pavilion Collection" by Wang Xizhi, written in semi-cursive script

Semi-cursive script aims for an informal, natural movement from one stroke to the next. Another distinct feature of this style is being able to pinpoint where each stroke originates and which stroke is it followed by. In order to be able to write in the semi-cursive style, the calligrapher should be able to write in the regular script and know the order the strokes should be written in.

Many calligraphers choose to use this style when they need to write things down quickly, but still require the characters to be readable. In Japan, most calligraphy works are done in this style due to its ability to create a style unique to the calligrapher in a small timeframe.

== Uses ==
Chinese characters for Guangdong written in simplified Chinese on top, traditional Chinese on the bottom.

The semi-cursive style is practiced for aesthetic purposes, and a calligrapher may choose to specialize in any script of their preference. The smooth transition and omission of some strokes of the semi-cursive style had also contributed to the simplification of Chinese characters by the People's Republic of China.

== Writing conventions ==
=== Stroke linking ===
One of the characteristics of semi-cursive script is the joining of consecutive strokes. To execute this, one must write a character in an uninterrupted manner and only stop the brush movement when required. In some scenarios, the strokes may not be visibly linked, but it is possible to grasp the direction in which each stroke is drawn.

=== Stroke merging and character simplification ===
The fast brush movement needed for the semi-cursive style allows a decrease in the number of strokes needed to produce a character. However, this is done in a way to preserve readability by considering the stroke order of each Chinese character in most cases. There are no solid rules to the way in which characters are simplified, and it is up to the calligrapher to display their personal style and preferences.

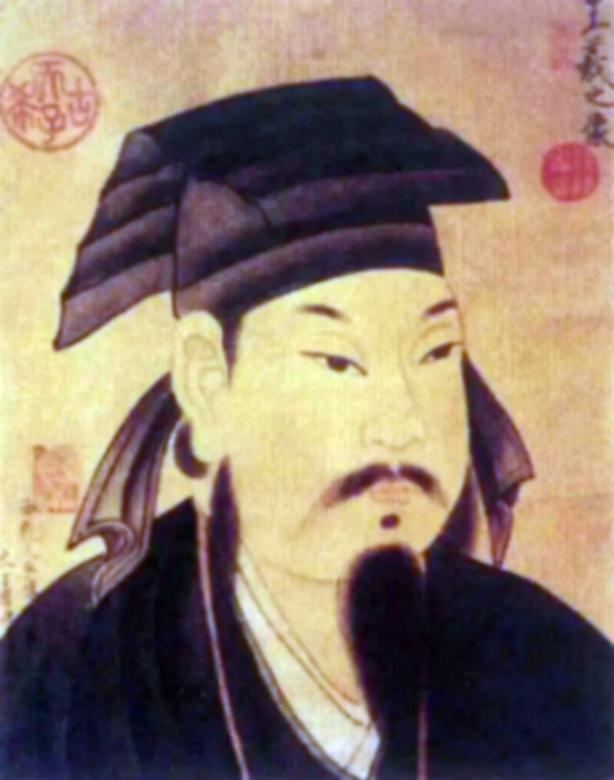
Artwork of the calligrapher Wang Xizhi

=== Stroke order modification ===
With the intention to prioritise speed, calligraphers may choose to make subtle changes to the stroke order of the written character. They may choose to reverse the direction of the stroke or write the strokes out of order compared to how they are written in the regular script.

=== Text direction ===
In works written using semi-cursive script, the size of each character can vary greatly with each other. Where works of the regular script are usually written in the same size, semi-cursive characters can be arranged to achieve “rhythm and balance” artistically. To preserve this rhythm and balance, most semi-cursive and cursive works are written in vertical columns from right to left, despite the adoption of the Western standard in Chinese texts, writing in rows from left to right.
