= Wang Huizhi =

Wang Huizhi (338 – 386 AD), courtesy name Ziyou, was a scholar and calligrapher of the eastern Jin dynasty, and the fifth son of renowned calligrapher Wang Xizhi. Wang Huizhi was born into the Wang clan of Langya Commandery (modern Linyi, Shandong). Initially entering officialdom through hereditary privileges, he served as cavalry officer under Huan Chong in Xuzhou, staff officer under grand general Huan Wen, and later as yellow gate attendant. He was naturally proud and unrestrained, showing little enthusiasm for official duties, often wandering aimlessly. Eventually, he chose to resign from his official position and settled in Shanyin (now Shaoxing in Zhejiang Province).

Wang Huizhi was an accomplished calligrapher, having studied under his father since childhood. Critics held that "Huizhi achieves Xizhi's momentum (徽之得其势)." His extant calligraphic works include the "Cheng Sao Bing Bu Jian Tie (承嫂病不减帖) " and "Xin Yue Tie (新月贴)" .

== Anecdotes ==
Wang Huizhi left behind him several anecdotes which were recorded in Shi Shuo Xin Yu, one of them is "coming on a whim". On a winter night after he retreated to Shanyin, the outside was covered with snow. Wang Huizhi was in a great mood and ordered wine to be served. Later, he thought of his good friend Dai Kui, who was in Shan county (now Shengzhou, Zhejiang Province). The two were far apart, but Wang Huizhi insisted on visiting his friend. He took a boat and set out, arriving at noon the next day. However, when he reached Dai Kui's door, he did not enter. When asked why, Wang Huizhi said, "I originally came on whim, now that my excitement has subsided, it's natural for me to go back."

Wang Huizhi was known for his obsession with bamboo, planting them around his places even on a temporary stay, and commenting, “How can one endure a day without this gentleman?”

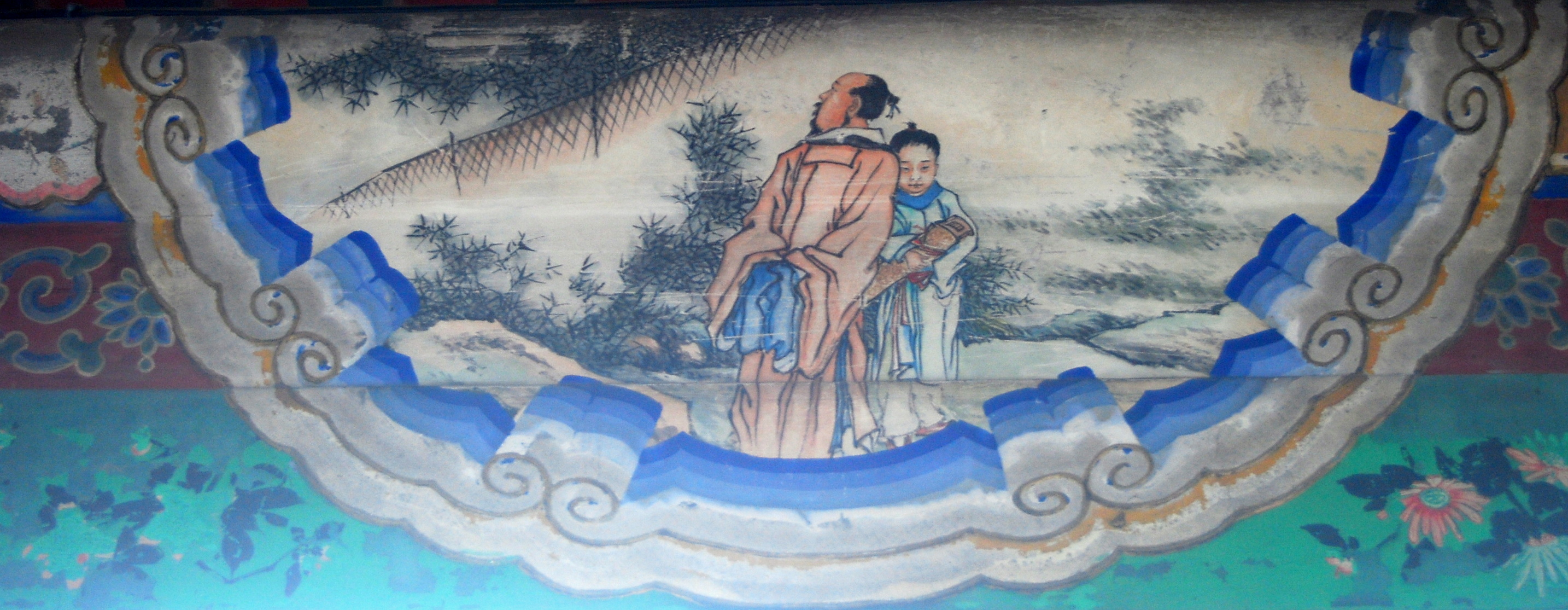
A mural painting in the Long Corridor of the Summer Palace: Ziyou Loves Bamboo (子猷爱竹)

Wang Huizhi shared a deep bond with his younger brother, Wang Xianzhi (王献之). When Wang Xianzhi fell seriously ill and passed away before him, Wang Huizhi did not shed tears at the funeral. Instead, he sat silently beside the coffin. Picking up the Guqin that Xianzhi had loved to play, he tried to play a tune but failed, eventually throwing the Guqin to the ground in grief, lamenting, "Zijing (子敬, courtesy name of Wang Xianzhi), both you and the Guqin have departed!" This incident gave rise to the proverbial saying "人琴俱亡" (both the person and the Guqin are gone). Just a few months later, Wang Huizhi himself passed away.
