= Yinqueshan Han Tombs Bamboo Slips Museum =

On-site archeological museum in Shandong, China

Coordinates: 35°3′15.10″N 118°20′30.17″E

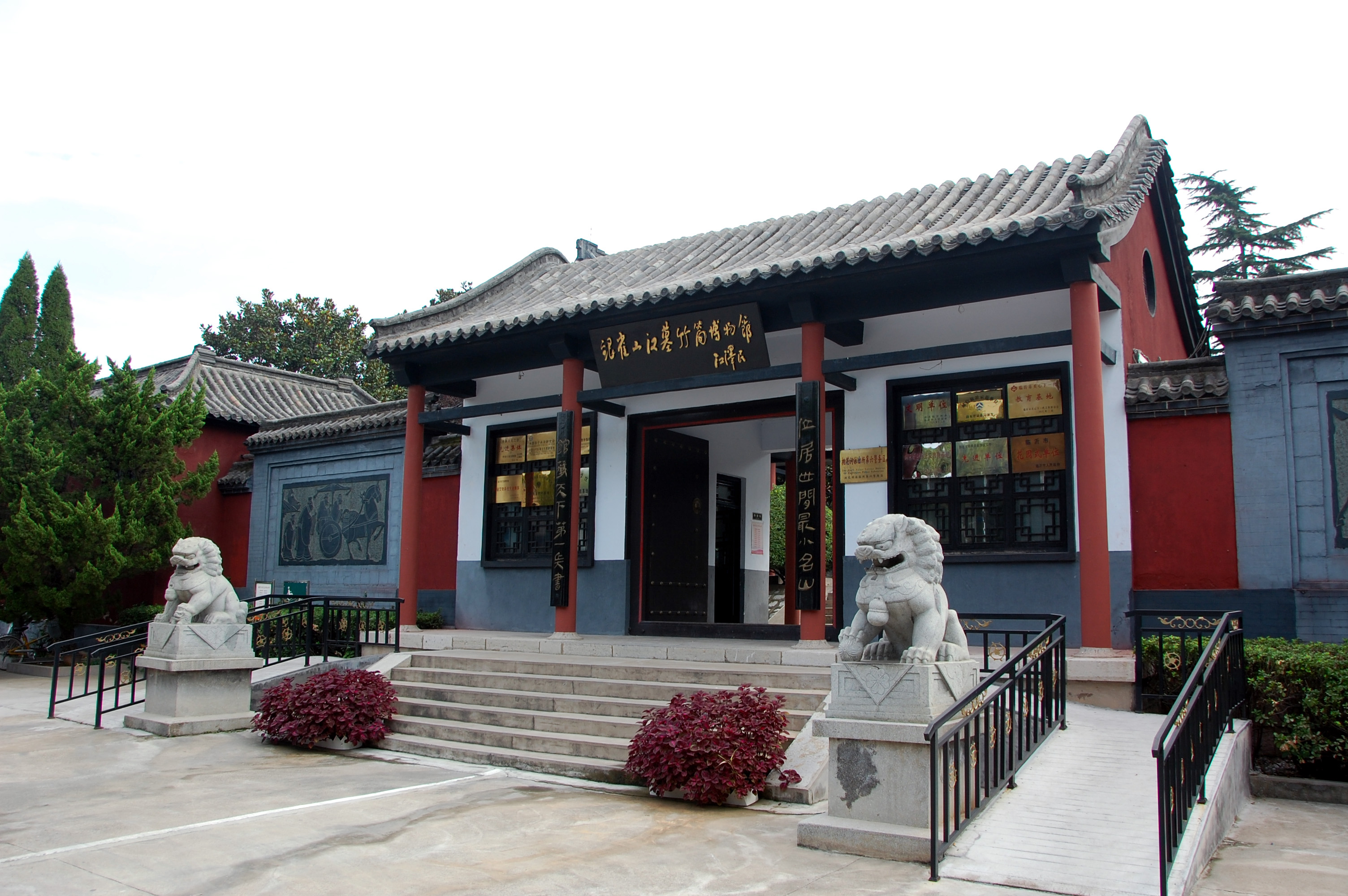
Entrance to the museum

The Yinqueshan Han Tombs Bamboo Slips Museum (Chinese: 银雀山汉墓竹简博物馆; pinyin: Yínquèshān Hànmù Zhújiǎn Bówùguǎn) is a museum dedicated to archaeological finds from two Western Han dynasty tombs excavated on site in Lanshan District, Linyi City, Shandong Province, China.

The tombs were excavated in 1972 and are most notable for the discovery of the Yinqueshan Han Slips, a collection of writings on bamboo slips that includes chapters from Sun Tzu's The Art of War and Sun Bin's Art of War.

The museum's exhibition area covers 10,000 square meters and is divided into three sections featuring the tombs, the bamboo slips, and other items recovered from the tombs, respectively.

The museum is located in the southeastern part of Linyi City.
