= Zaozhuang–Linyi railway =

Railroad line in Shandong, China

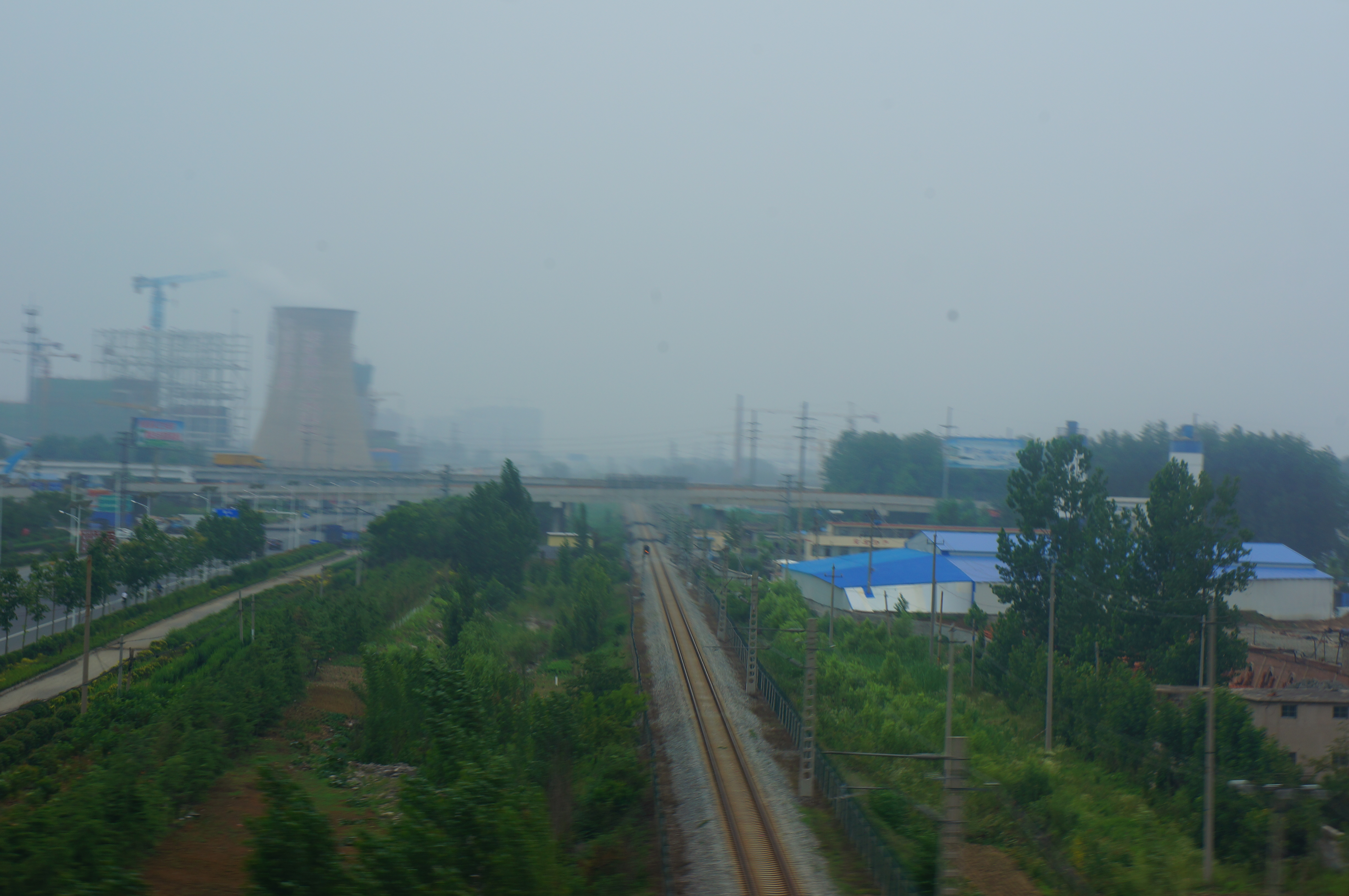
Zaozhuang–Linyi railway is a railway.jpg

The Zaozhuang–Linyi railway (Chinese: 枣临铁路; pinyin: Zǎolín tiělù) is a railway line in Shandong, China.

== History ==
Work on the line began in early 2009. It opened on 29 November 2012.

== Specification ==
The line is 119.5 kilometres (74.3 mi) long and has a maximum speed of 120 kilometres per hour (75 mph). It is single-track and electrified. The western terminus of the line is Zaozhuang West railway station on the Beijing–Shanghai railway. The eastern terminus is Zhubao railway station, a freight terminus on the Yanzhou–Shijiusuo railway.
