= Qian Xuan =

Chinese painter (1235–1305)

Qián Xuǎn
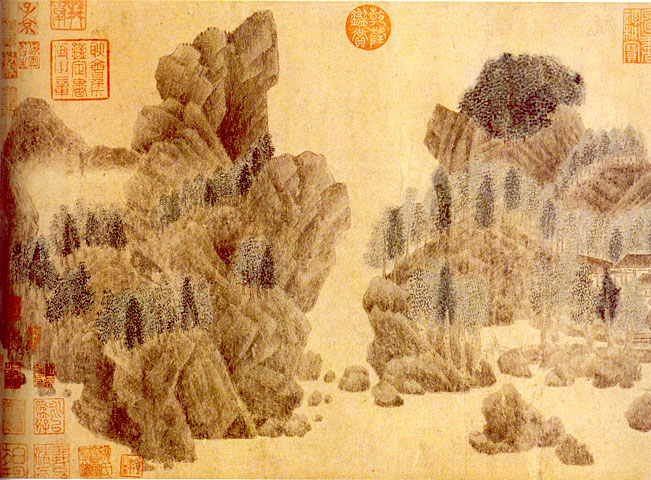
- Dwelling in the Floating Jade Mountains (浮玉山居)
- Born: 1235
- Died: 1305 (aged 69–70)
- Occupation: Painter

Qian Xuan (simplified Chinese: 钱选; traditional Chinese: 錢選; pinyin: Qián Xuǎn; Wade–Giles: Ch'ien Hsüan; 1235–1305), courtesy name Shun Ju (舜举), pseudonyms Yu Tan (玉潭, "Jade Pool"), Xi Lanweng (习嬾翁), and Zha Chuanweng (霅川翁), was a Chinese painter from Huzhou (湖州), the present day Wuxing District in Zhejiang. He lived during the late Song dynasty and early Yuan dynasty.

== Biography ==
Qian Xuan started as an aspiring scholar-official during the rule of the Southern Song (960–1279). However, he had difficulty climbing the ranks of officialdom. When the Mongol-founded Yuan dynasty took over the southern regions of China in 1276, he effectively gave up on the idea of a career in civil administration. In 1286, his friend Zhao Mengfu found and accepted a position there, and so for a time it seemed he could as well. However, he refused on patriotic grounds, while he cited old age to avoid difficulties. He nevertheless was considered a Song loyalist.

His life after 1276 was devoted to painting, and he became noted as a "fur and feathers" painter. He was also adept at bird-and-flower painting, character painting, and landscape painting (shan shui). He is known for landscapes that hinted at a longing for a return of native Chinese rule, such as in the work Home Again. He mixed Song realism with an archaic Tang style.

== Works ==
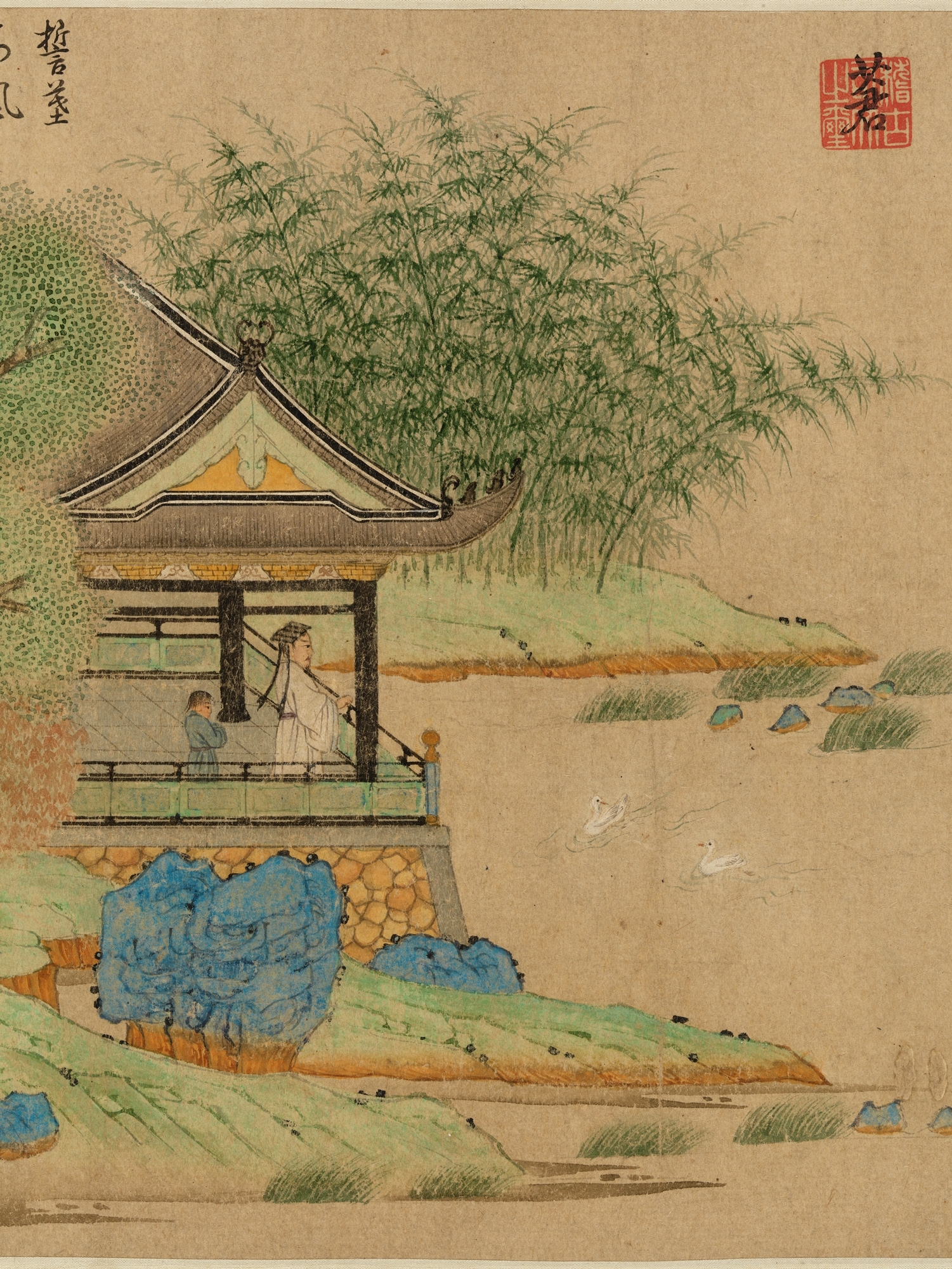
Wang Xizhi, by Qian Xuan (1235–1305 AD)

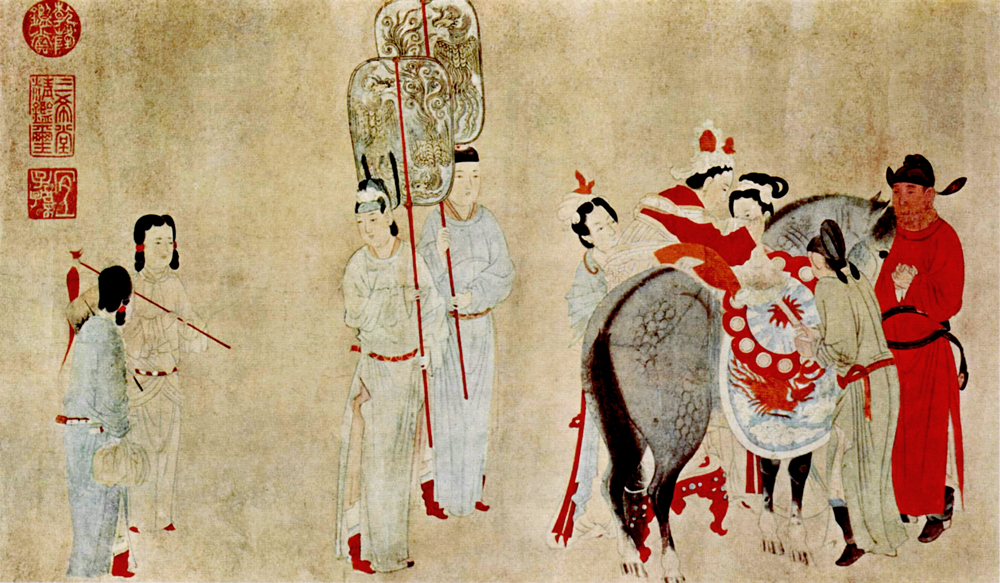
Yang Guifei Mounting a Horse, by Qian Xuan (1235–1305 AD)

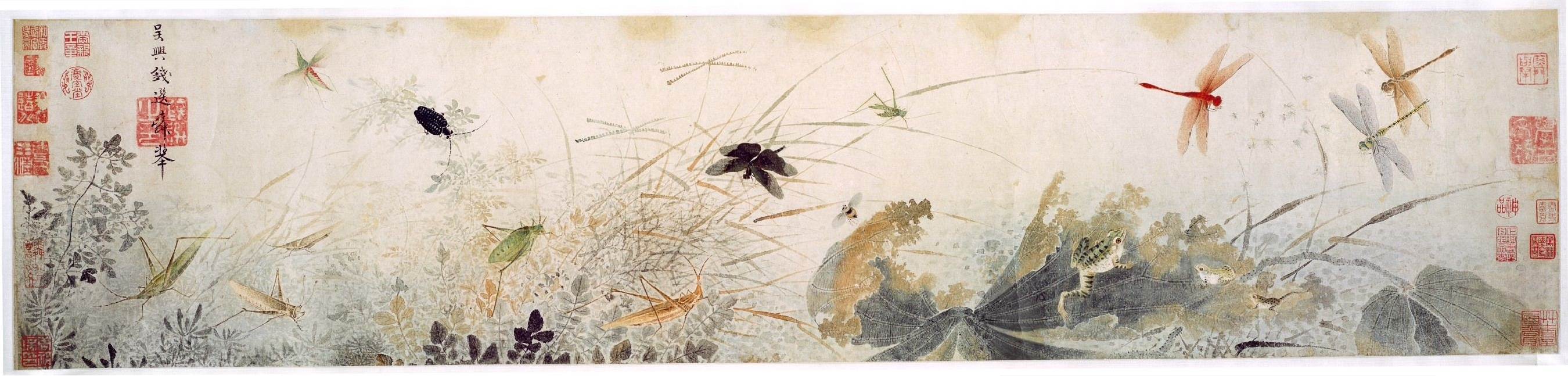
Early Autumn

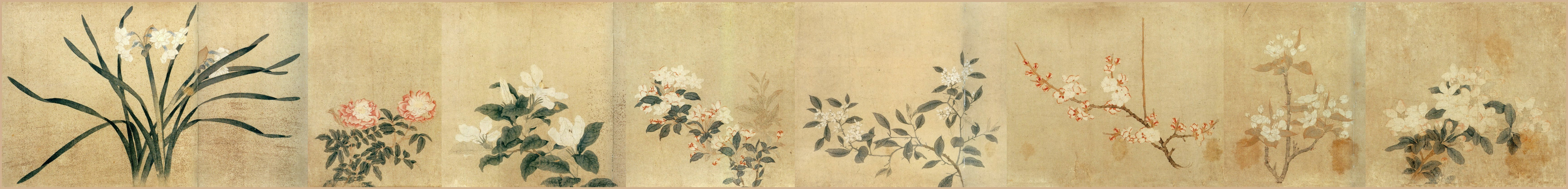
