= Feixian railway station =

Railway station in Linyi, China

Feixian 费县
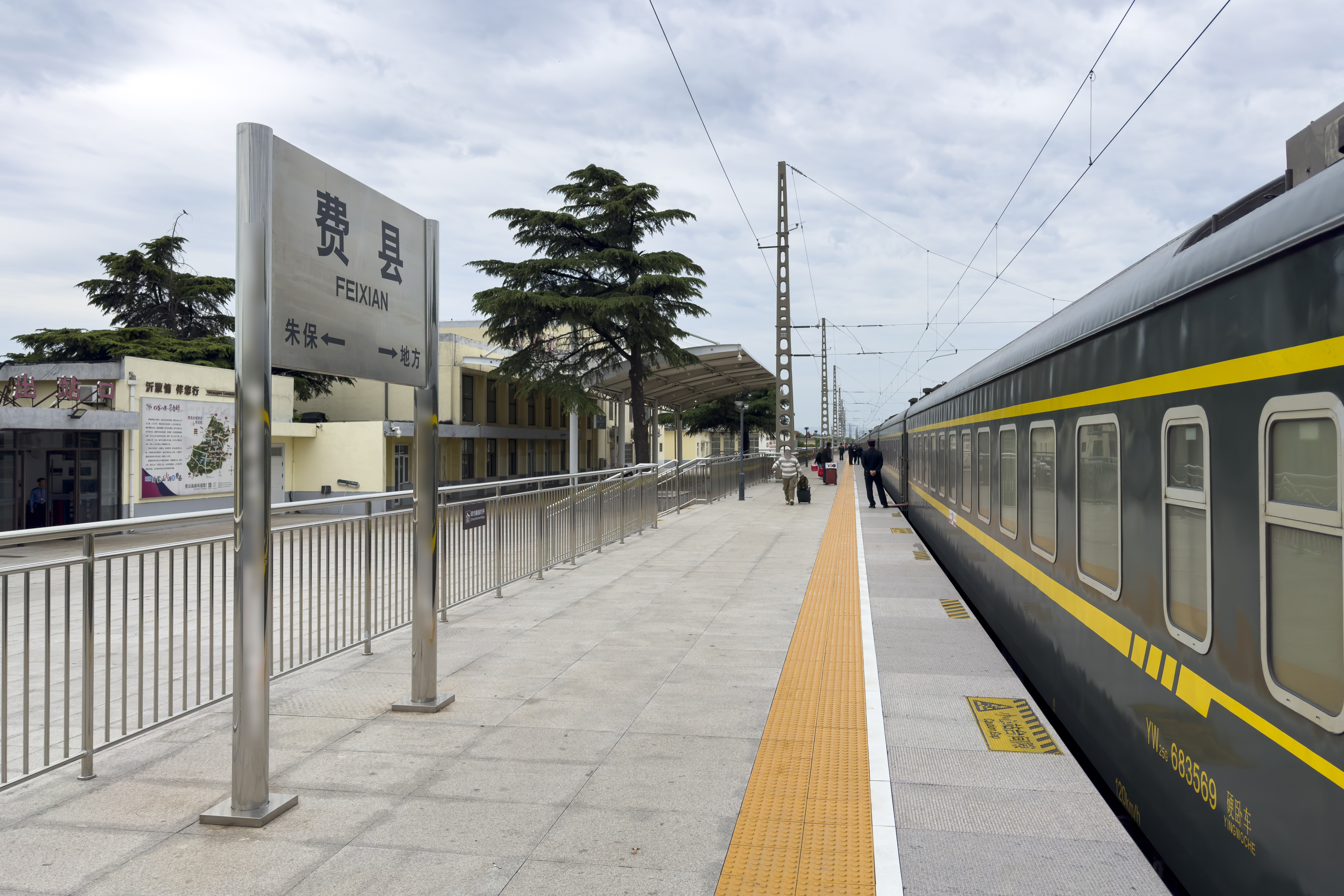
- Platform 1

General information
- Location: Feicheng Subdistrict, Fei County, Linyi, Shandong; China
- Coordinates: 35.2784°N 117.9737°E
- Operator: China Railway Jinan Group
- Line: Yanzhou–Shijiusuo railway

History
- Opened: 1984
Location

Feixian railway station (Chinese: 费县站) is a third-class railway station in Feicheng Subdistrict, Fei County, Linyi, Shandong on the Yanzhou–Shijiusuo railway. It was built in 1984 and is under the jurisdiction of China Railway Jinan Group.

Preceding station	China Railway	Following station
Pingyi towards Yanzhou	Yanzhou–Shijiusuo railway	Linyi towards Rizhao
