= Linyi North railway station =

Railway station in Shandong, China

Linyi North 临沂北
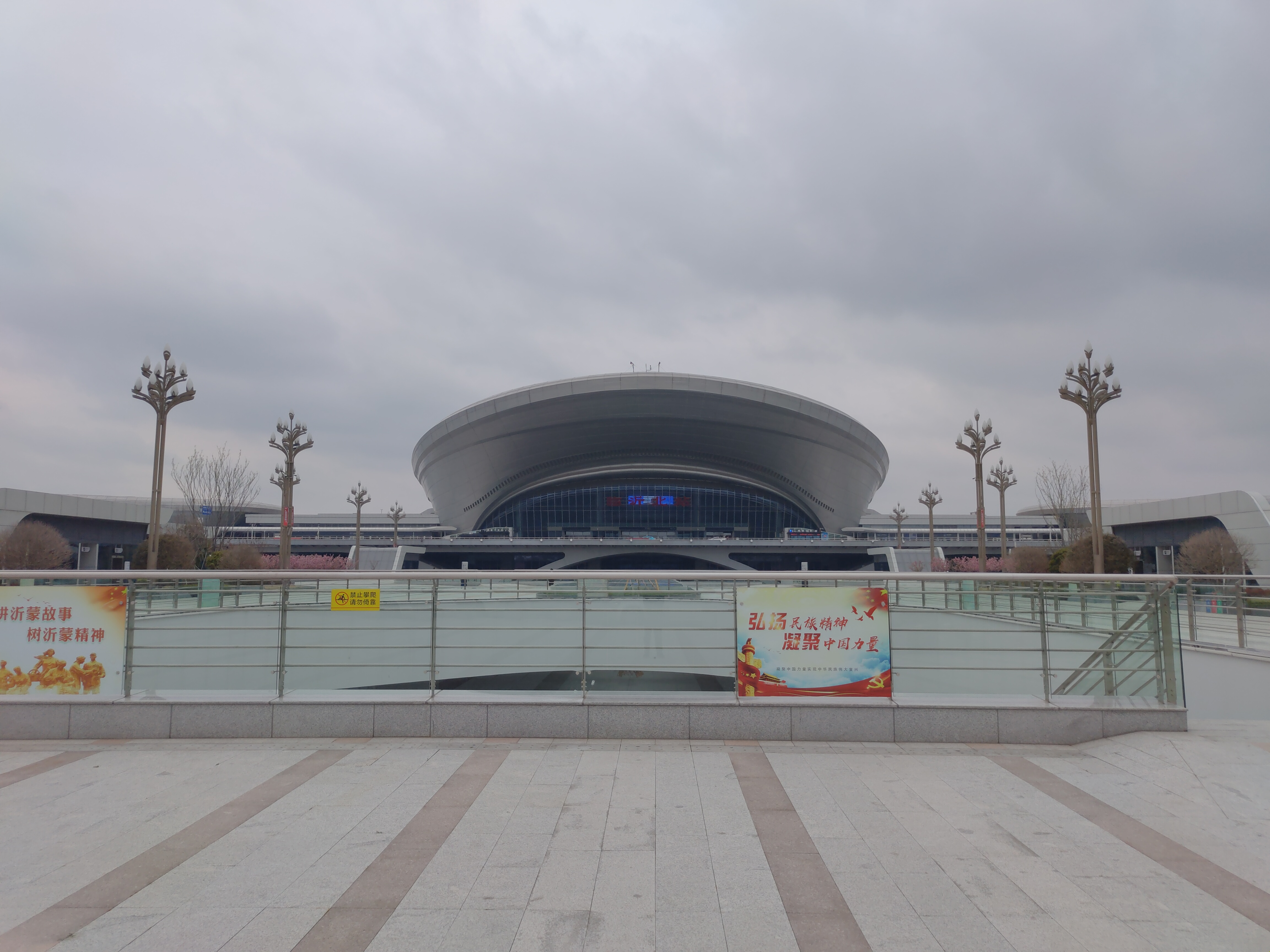

General information
- Location: Lanshan District, Linyi, Shandong; China
- Coordinates: 35.196789°N 118.374854°E
- Operated by: China Railway High-speed
- Line: Rizhao–Lankao high-speed railway

History
- Opened: November 26, 2019
Location

Linyi North railway station (Chinese: 临沂北站) is a railway station in Lanshan District, Linyi, Shandong, China. The station opened on 26 November 2019 with the initial section of the Rizhao–Lankao high-speed railway, between Qufu East and Rizhao.

Once complete, Linyi North will have sixteen platforms (eight islands).
