= Lanshan, Linyi =

Coordinates: 35°01′24″N 118°17′16″E

Lanshan District 兰山区
- District
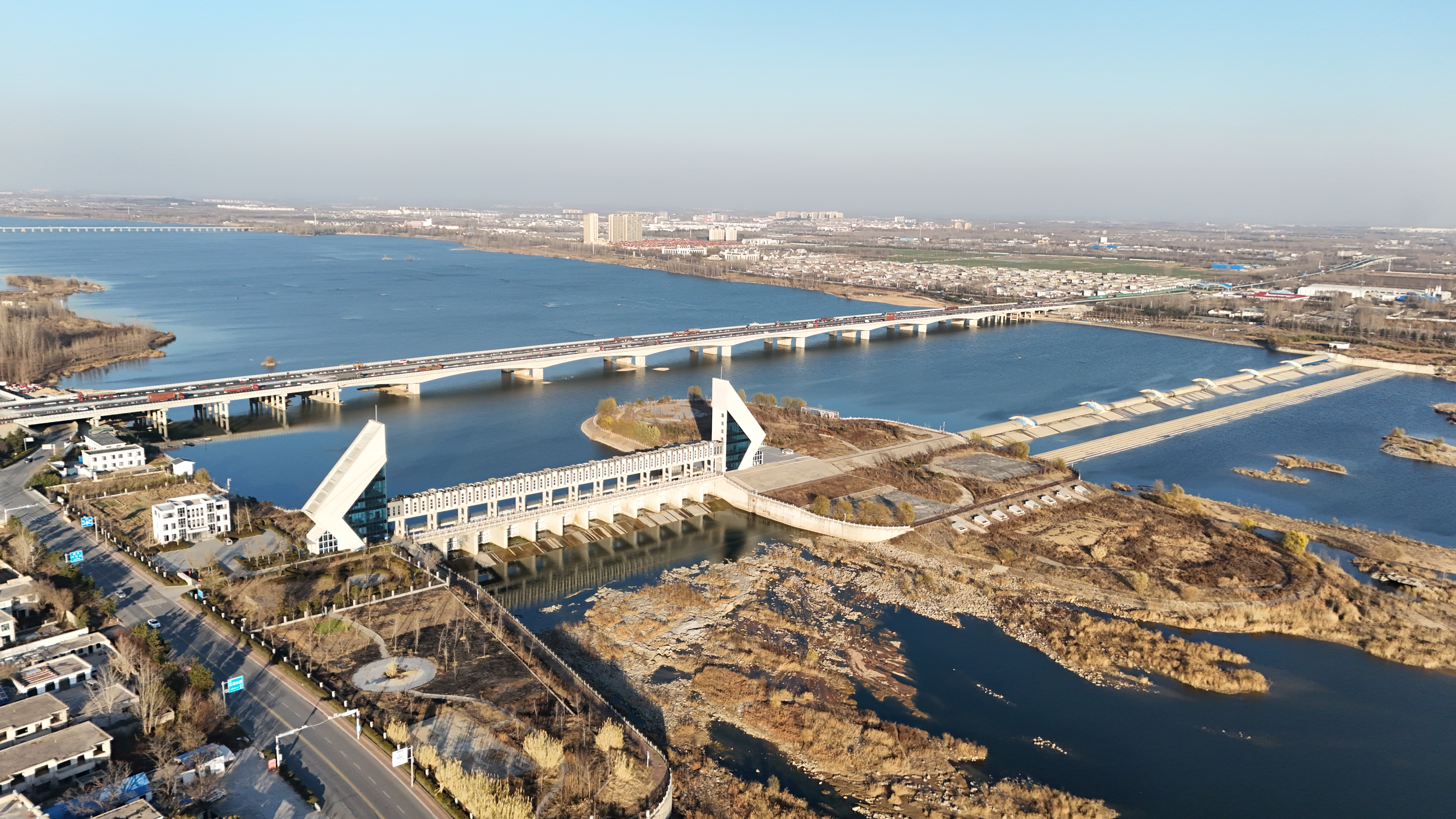
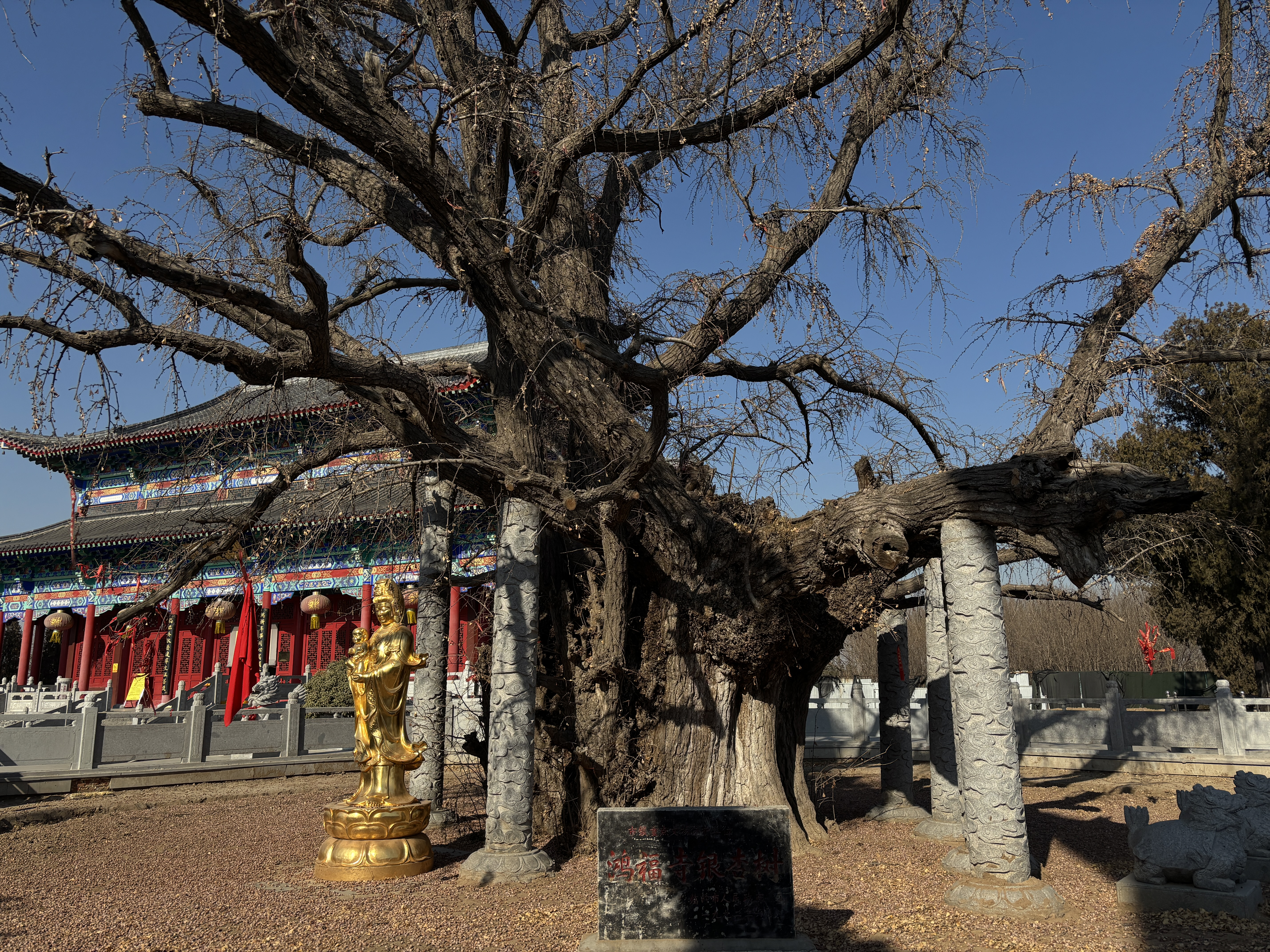
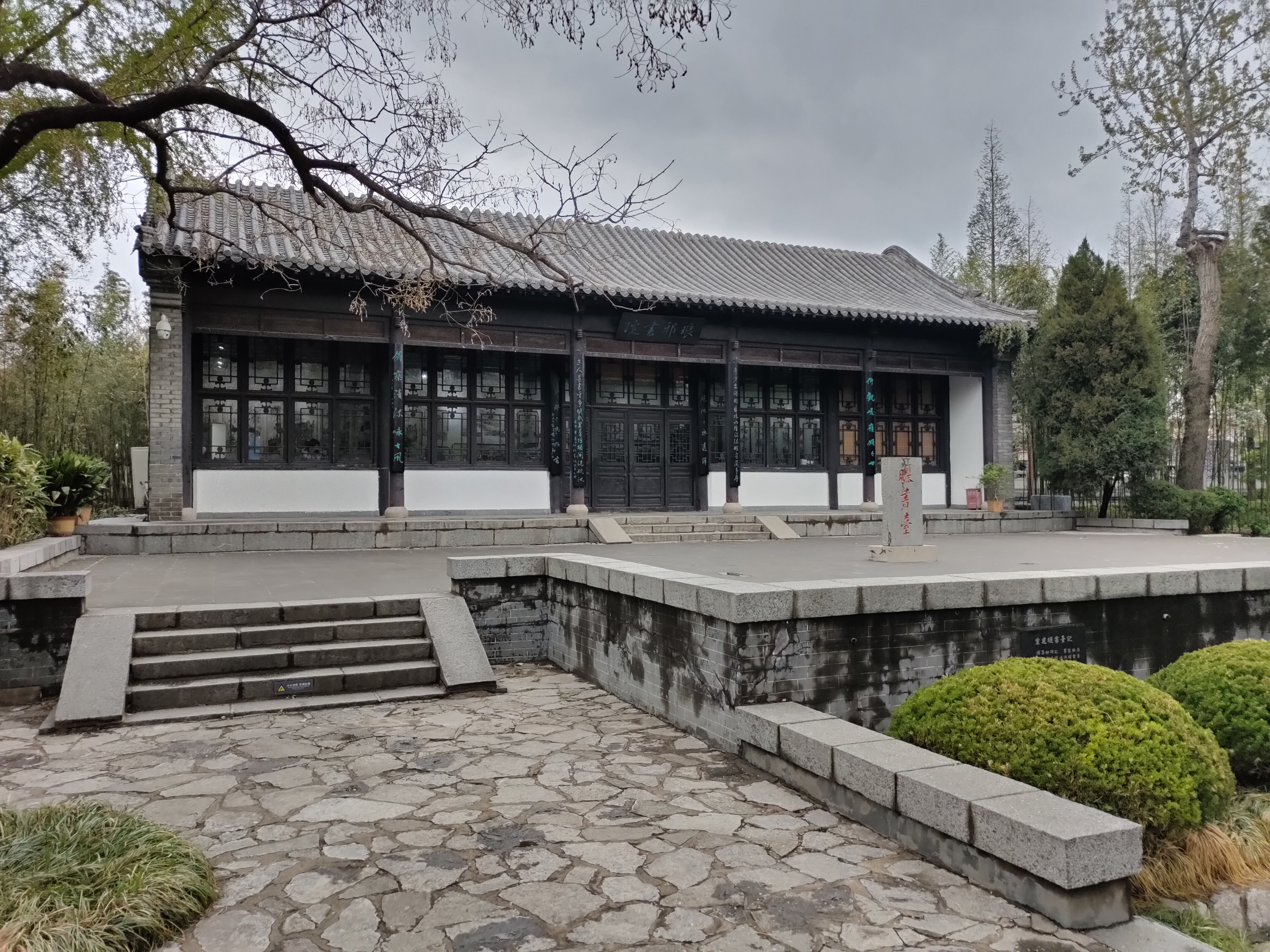
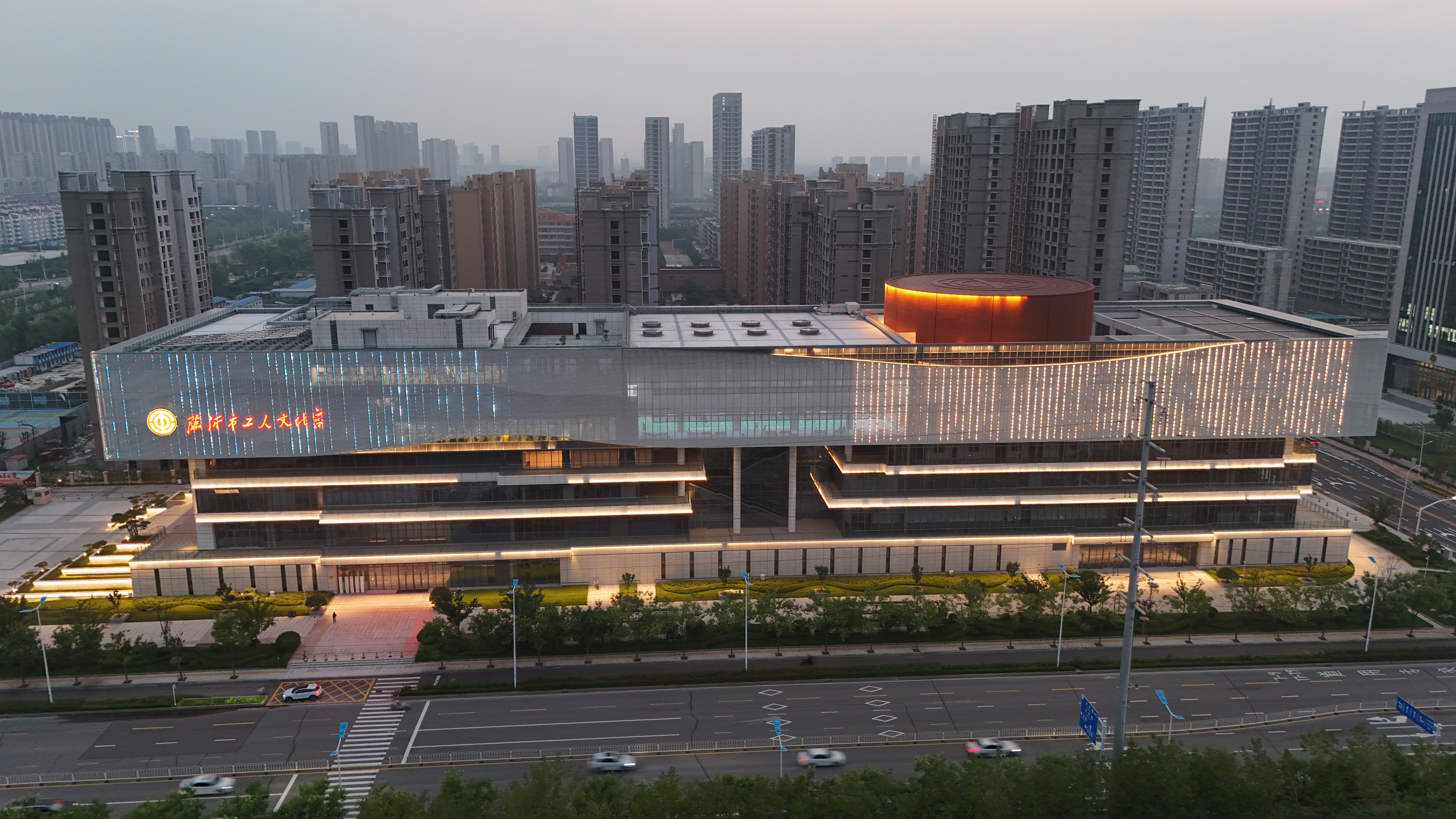
- Yi River in the city Hongfu Temple Former Residence of Wang Xizhi Linyi Workers' Palace of Culture

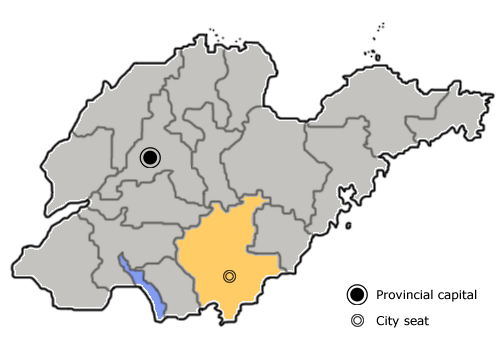
- Location of Linyi in Shandong
- Country: People's Republic of China
- Province: Shandong
- Prefecture-level city: Linyi

Area
  - Total: 818 km^{2} (316 sq mi)

Population (2019)
  - Total: 1,373,000
  - Density: 1,680/km^{2} (4,350/sq mi)
- Time zone: UTC+8 (China Standard)
- Postal code: 276002

Lanshan (simplified Chinese: 兰山区; traditional Chinese: 蘭山區; pinyin: Lánshān Qū) is a district of Linyi City, Shandong Province, China. It serves as the center of Linyi and is the location of the city's government and cultural sites such as the Yinqueshan Han Tombs Bamboo Slips Museum. It was formerly the Linyi County and the Linyi county-level city, before Linyi was upgraded to a prefecture-level city and its urban center was renamed as Lanshan District.

== Administrative divisions ==
As of 2012, this district is divided to 4 subdistricts and 10 towns.

Subdistricts

- Lanshan Subdistrict (兰山街道)
- Yinqueshan Subdistrict (银雀山街道)
- Jinqueshan Subdistrict (金雀山街道)
- Nanfang Subdistrict (南坊街道)

Towns

- Baishabu (白沙埠镇)
- Zaogoutou (枣沟头镇)
- Bancheng (半程镇)
- Yitang (义堂镇)
- Machanghu (马厂湖镇)
- Liguan (李官镇)
- Zhubao (朱保镇)
- Xinqiao (新桥镇)
- Fangcheng (方城镇)
- Wanggou (汪沟镇)

== Transportation ==
Linyi railway station and Linyi North railway station are both located here.
