= Robert E. Harrist =

American art historian (born 1951)

Robert E. Harrist Jr. (born 1951) is Jane and Leopold Swergold Professor Emeritus of Chinese Art History at Columbia University. His book, The Landscape of Words, was awarded the Joseph Levenson Prize in 2010. He was Slade Professor of Fine Art at the University of Cambridge for 2006–07.

== Selected publications ==
- Power and Virtue: The Horse in Chinese Art. Art Media Resources, 1997.
- Painting and Private Life in Eleventh-Century China: Mountain Villa by Li Gonglin. Princeton University Press, 1998.
- The Embodied Image: Chinese Calligraphy from the John B. Elliott Collection. Art Museum at Princeton University, 1999.
- The Landscape of Words. University of Washington Press, 2008.
