= Tai'erzhuang, Zaozhuang =

Tai'erzhuang District 台儿庄区 Taierhchwang, T'ai-erh-chuang
- District
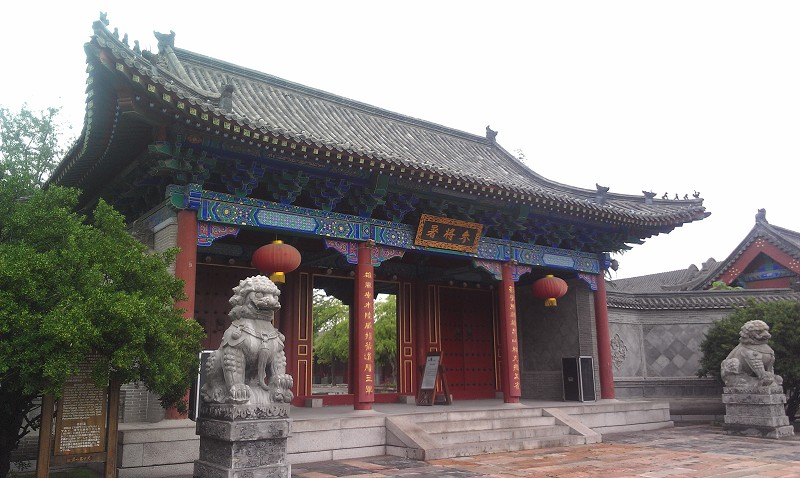
- Old Town of Tai'erzhuang

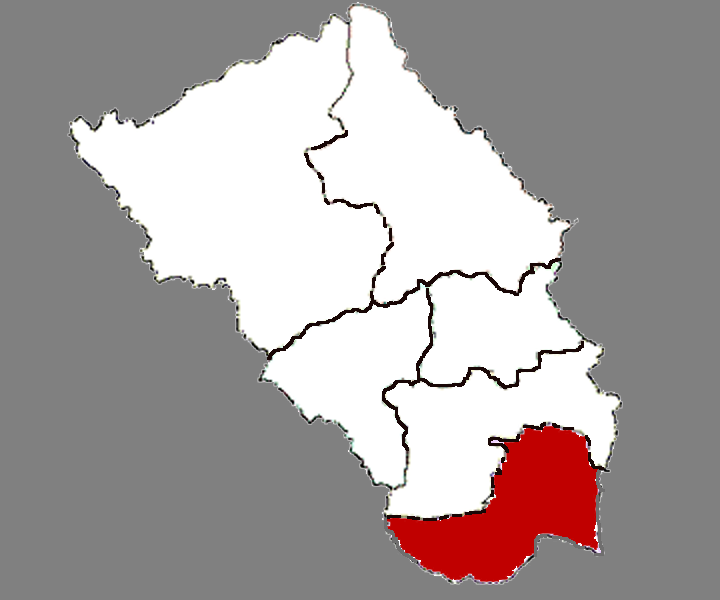
- Location in Zaozhuang

- Location in Shandong
- Coordinates: 34°33′47″N 117°44′03″E
- Country: People's Republic of China
- Province: Shandong
- Prefecture-level city: Zaozhuang

Area
  - Total: 538.5 km^{2} (207.9 sq mi)

Population (2014)
  - Total: 321,900
  - Density: 597.8/km^{2} (1,548/sq mi)
- Time zone: UTC+8 (China Standard)
- Postal code: 277400
- Website: www.tez.gov.cn

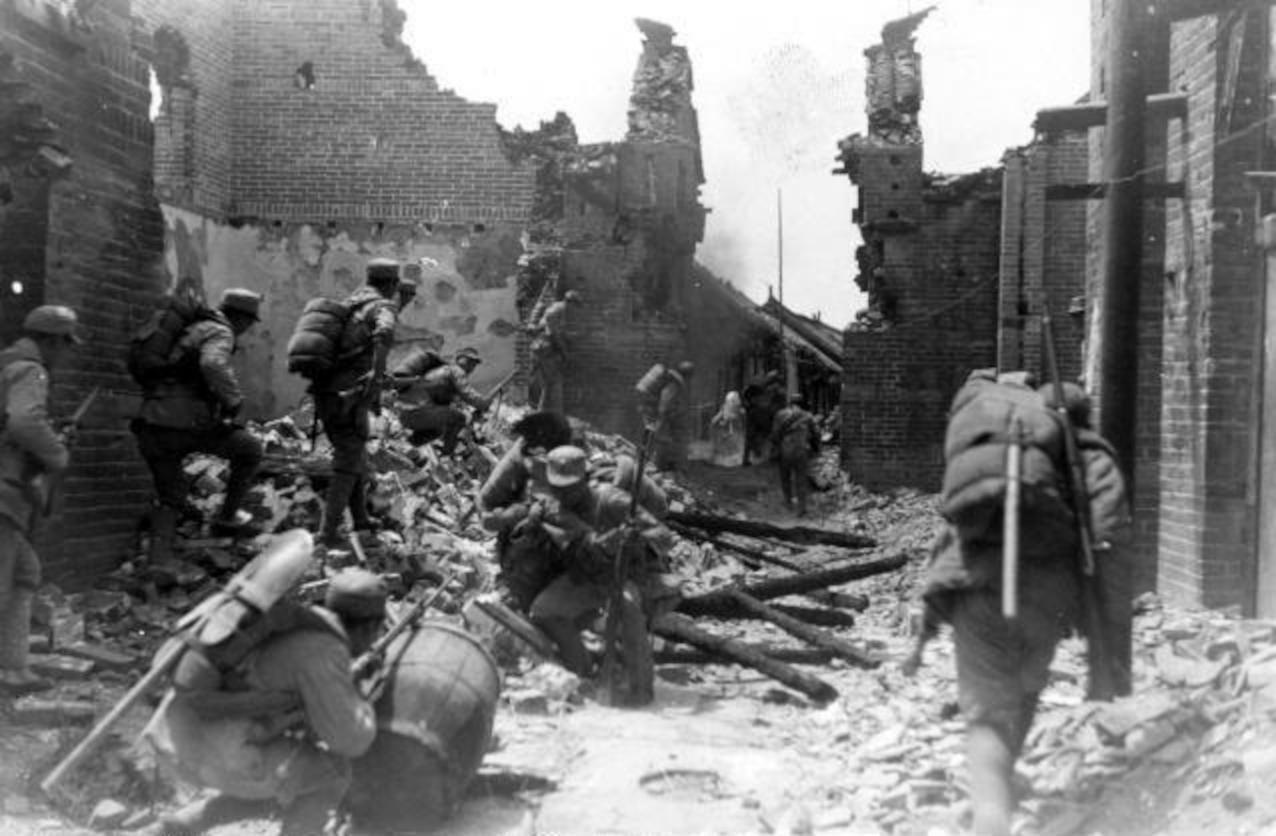
House to house fighting during the Battle of Taierzhuang

Tai'erzhuang
- Simplified Chinese: 台儿庄
- Traditional Chinese: 臺兒莊
- Postal: Taierhchwang
Transcriptions
Standard Mandarin
- Hanyu Pinyin: Tái'érzhuāng
- Wade–Giles: T'ai^{2}-erh^{2}-chuang^{1}
Yue: Cantonese
- Jyutping: toi^{4}ji^{4}zong^{1}

Tai'erzhuang District (simplified Chinese: 台儿庄区; traditional Chinese: 臺兒莊區; pinyin: Tái'érzhuāng Qū) is the southernmost of five districts under the administration of the prefecture-level city of Zaozhuang. The district is located in the south of Shandong Province, China, bordering Jiangsu province to the south. It covers an area of 538 km^{2} (208 sq mi) and has a population of 290,000. According to the seventh population census data, as of 0:00 on November 1, 2020, the permanent population of Taierzhuang District was 305,102.

In 2009, Taierzhuang was designated by the Taiwan Affairs Office as China's first "Cross Strait Exchange Base".

The district was the site of the Battle of Taierzhuang fought between the armies of the Chinese Kuomintang and Imperial Japan in 1938 during the Second Sino-Japanese War. The site of the battle (台儿庄大战旧址; Tái'érzhuāng dàzhàn jiùzhǐ) has been listed as a national monument of the People's Republic of China since 2006 (resolution number 6-981).

== Administrative divisions ==
As of 2012, this district is divided to 1 subdistrict and 5 towns.

Subdistricts

- Yunhe Subdistrict (运河街道)

Towns

- Pizhuang (邳庄镇)
- Zhangshanzi (张山子镇)
- Nigou (泥沟镇)
- Jiantouji (涧头集镇)
- Malantun (马兰屯镇)

== Climate ==
Climate data for Tai'erzhuang, elevation 28 m (92 ft), (1991–2020 normals, extremes 1981–present)
Month	Jan	Feb	Mar	Apr	May	Jun	Jul	Aug	Sep	Oct	Nov	Dec	Year
Record high °C (°F)	17.0 (62.6)	25.5 (77.9)	32.9 (91.2)	32.9 (91.2)	36.6 (97.9)	38.8 (101.8)	40.6 (105.1)	37.9 (100.2)	36.8 (98.2)	34.9 (94.8)	27.2 (81.0)	20.9 (69.6)	40.6 (105.1)
Mean daily maximum °C (°F)	5.5 (41.9)	8.9 (48.0)	14.6 (58.3)	21.3 (70.3)	26.5 (79.7)	30.5 (86.9)	31.6 (88.9)	30.7 (87.3)	27.3 (81.1)	22.0 (71.6)	14.3 (57.7)	7.5 (45.5)	20.1 (68.1)
Daily mean °C (°F)	0.3 (32.5)	3.3 (37.9)	8.8 (47.8)	15.3 (59.5)	20.9 (69.6)	25.2 (77.4)	27.4 (81.3)	26.5 (79.7)	22.2 (72.0)	16.2 (61.2)	8.8 (47.8)	2.2 (36.0)	14.8 (58.6)
Mean daily minimum °C (°F)	−3.7 (25.3)	−1.2 (29.8)	3.5 (38.3)	9.7 (49.5)	15.5 (59.9)	20.3 (68.5)	23.9 (75.0)	23.1 (73.6)	18.0 (64.4)	11.5 (52.7)	4.3 (39.7)	−1.9 (28.6)	10.2 (50.4)
Record low °C (°F)	−16.6 (2.1)	−17.0 (1.4)	−9.9 (14.2)	−2.0 (28.4)	3.5 (38.3)	11.2 (52.2)	16.2 (61.2)	12.8 (55.0)	8.1 (46.6)	−2.8 (27.0)	−8.9 (16.0)	−13.8 (7.2)	−17.0 (1.4)
Average precipitation mm (inches)	14.6 (0.57)	18.9 (0.74)	27.5 (1.08)	40.4 (1.59)	73.8 (2.91)	101.5 (4.00)	220.9 (8.70)	207.4 (8.17)	70.4 (2.77)	35.4 (1.39)	30.8 (1.21)	15.3 (0.60)	856.9 (33.73)
Average precipitation days (≥ 0.1 mm)	4.0	5.0	5.0	6.5	7.1	7.4	12.8	11.7	7.4	5.4	5.4	4.0	81.7
Average snowy days	2.7	2.3	0.7	0	0	0	0	0	0	0	0.5	1.5	7.7
Average relative humidity (%)	66	64	61	63	66	69	80	82	76	70	71	68	70
Mean monthly sunshine hours	137.5	141.6	186.4	209.0	219.0	189.2	176.2	171.0	171.0	168.4	148.7	144.1	2,062.1
Percentage possible sunshine	44	45	50	53	51	44	40	42	47	49	48	47	47
Source: China Meteorological Administration

Taierzhuang is a warm temperate continental monsoon climate zone.Four distinct seasons, abundant sunshine, abundant heat, and a long frost-free period.

== Transportation ==
Taierzhuang is located at the border of Shandong and Jiangsu provinces, passing through are the Beijing-Fuzhou Expressway, the National Highway 206, and the Beijing-Shanghai HSR. There are four airports (Xuzhou Guanyin, Linyi, Jining, and Lianyungang), three high-speed railway stations (Zaozhuang, Xuzhou, and Tengzhou), and three seaports (Shijiu, Lanshan, and Lianyungang) nearby. The Grand Canal, known as the "Golden Waterway", spans 42 kilometers across the district and is open to 2000 ton ships year-round. Water transportation directly reaches areas such as Yangzhou, Nanjing, Shanghai, and Hangzhou.

== Main tourist attractions ==
As of November 2013, Taierzhuang has one 5A level scenic spot in Taierzhuang Ancient Town, 2 Taierzhuang War Memorial Hall, and two 4A level scenic spots in Taierzhuang National Canal Wetland Park per the AAAAA Tourist Attraction System managed by the Ministry of Culture and Tourism.

In February 2016, it was selected as one of the first batch to create a "National Comprehensive Tourism Demonstration Zone".

Taierzhuang Ancient Town, containing 11 functional divisions, 8 scenic spots and 29 attractions, it is the largest ancient city in China. For the national AAAAA level tourist attractions, the ancient city of Taierzhuang has an ancient river, ancient wharf, Chinese ancient water city, Taierzhuang Battle Memorial Hall, cross-strait exchange base. Together with Warsaw, the capital of Poland, it is one of the only two cities in the world to have been rebuilt as a World Heritage Site after being destroyed by the shelling of the Second World War.

Taierzhuang Battle Memorial Hall, built to commemorate the famous Battle of Taierzhuang at the beginning of the Second Sino-Japanese War, it is a national AAAA level scenic spot. It consists of monument, exhibition hall, movie and television hall, panoramic painting hall, war correspondent's hall, tomb of the unsung heroes, etc. It also has a temporary exhibition hall, multifunctional report hall and red library.

Taierzhuang Canal Wetland Park, the first national wetland park construction pilot approved by the State Forestry.Administration with the theme of canal wetland in China. There are more than a thousand kinds of plants and animals in the territory, which is a natural gene pool of species.In 2013, it passed the acceptance of national 4A level tourist attraction and was promoted to national 4A level tourist attraction.

== See also ==
- Battle of Taierzhuang
