= Hongcun (Shandong) =

Hongcun 洪村
- Village
- Interactive map of Hongcun
- Country: China
- Province: Shandong
- City: Zaozhuang

Hongcun (Simplified: 洪村) is a village in Shizhong, Zaozhuang city, Shandong province, China.

== History ==
Hung Village was built during the Ming Dynasty in 1449 by Hong Jian Cun, Hong Cun, and Gu Ming.

In July 1953, the agency merged with Tengxian West Jining agency. Fushan is the agency leader for the area.

On September 12, 1961, the village commune merged into the village of West Wang Zhuang commune.

In November 1983, Hong Village became part of the West Wang Zhuang commune.

In 1984, West Wang Zhuang commune became part of Zhuang Xiang Xi wang.

In November 2014, central city set up. Xi Wang Zhuang Zhen Hong Cun membership.

== Geography ==
Hong Village is located in Zaozhuang city of Shandong province in West Zhuang Zhen, latitude 34 degrees 48 '1.13 ", longitude 117 degrees 35' 54.74". It is about 1.28 square kilometers in area.

Shahe basin provides the main water supply, covering about 112.2 square kilometers.

== Economy ==
Its economy is primarily agricultural and industrial. The main crops are wheat, corn, peaches, and nectarines. Industry includes a garment factory and Shandong Taihe Water Treatment Technologies Co., Ltd.

== Education ==
Hong Cun Lianxiao provides primary school education, employing more than 20 teachers.

== Medical facilities ==
Hong Village has a health room, with 10 employees.

== Traffic ==
Hong village traffic developed, ten Taiwan highway, road dates (030 County Road) and through.

== Historical Relics ==
Hong Cun blockhouse is an important historic buildings.
