= Zaozhuang railway station =

Railway station in Xuecheng District, People's Republic of China

Zaozhuang 枣庄
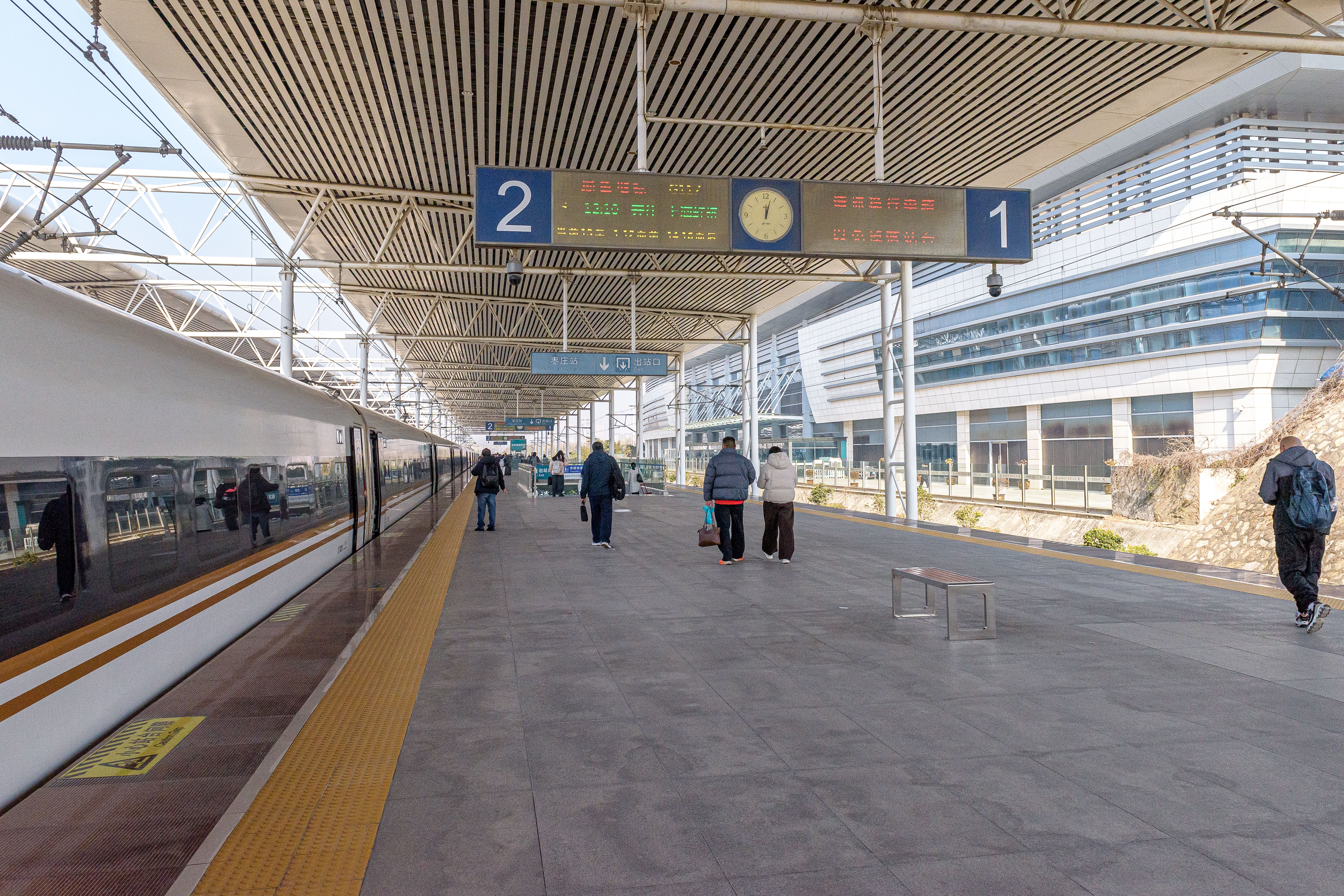
- Zaozhuang railway station

General information
- Location: Southern End of Qilianshan Road, Xuecheng District, Zaozhuang, Shandong; China
- Coordinates: 34.780764°N 117.305943°E
- Operated by: Jinan Railway Bureau; China Railway Corporation
- Line: Beijing–Shanghai high-speed railway

History
- Opened: 2011
Location

Zaozhuang railway station (simplified Chinese: 枣庄站; traditional Chinese: 棗莊站) is a railway station in Zaozhuang, Shandong, People's Republic of China. It is served by the Beijing–Shanghai high-speed railway. This railway station is about 60 kilometers from Tai'er Zhuang Ancient Town and 7 kilometers from Zaozhuang West Railway Station. High-speed trains from/to Beijing, Shanghai, Qingdao, Jinan and other cities mainly run through Zaozhuang railway station.

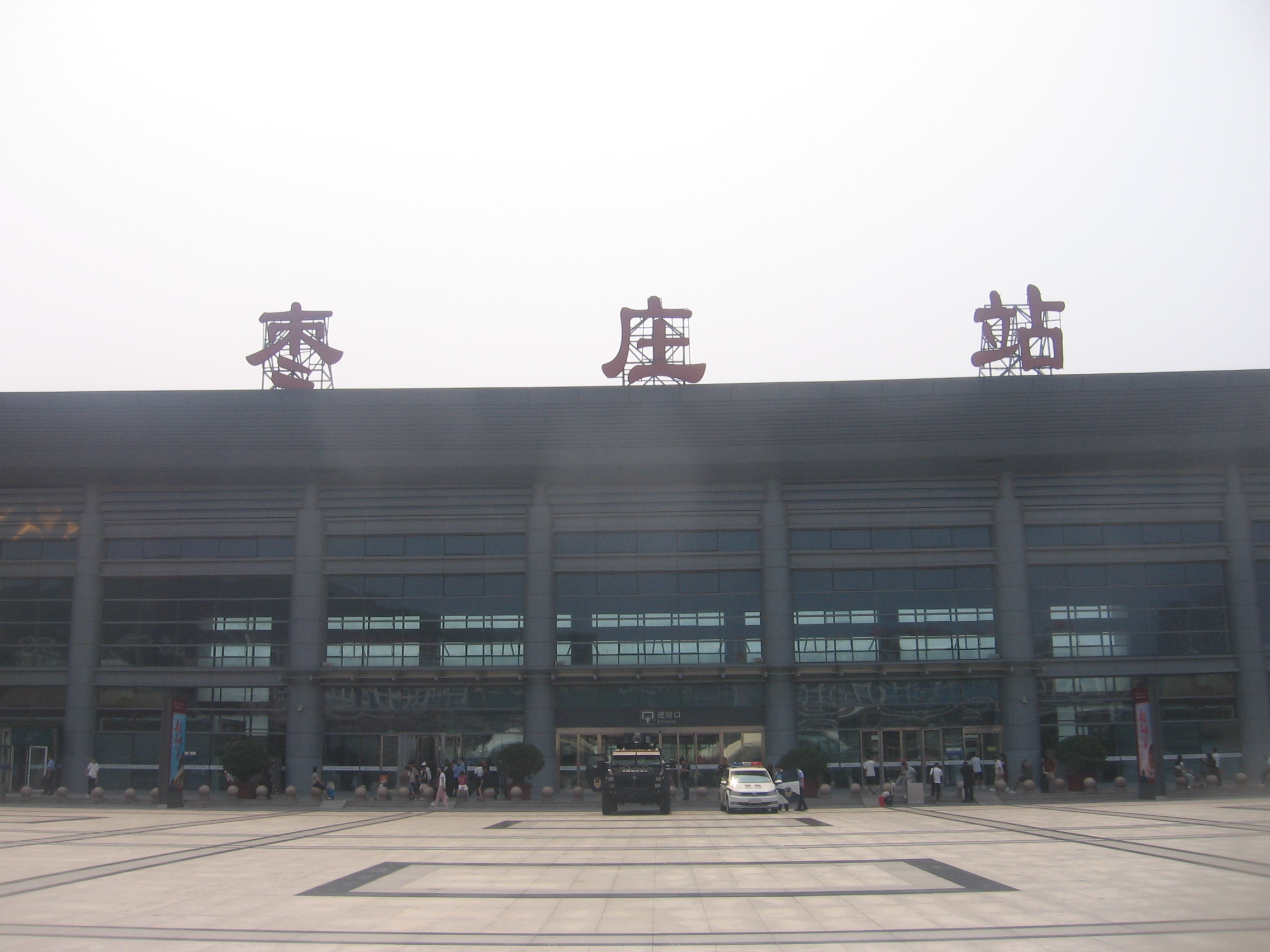
Zaozhuang Railway Station

| Preceding station | China Railway High-speed | Following station |
|---|---|---|
| Tengzhou East towards Beijing South or Tianjin West | Beijing–Shanghai high-speed railway | Xuzhou East towards Shanghai Hongqiao |
