= Zaozhuang Yiyun Airport =

Zaozhuang Yiyun Airport 枣庄翼云机场
- IATA: ZZH; ICAO: ZSZF

Summary
- Airport type: Public
- Serves: Zaozhuang, Shandong, China
- Coordinates: 34.9074°N 117.4080°E

Map
- Location of airport in Shandong

Zaozhuang Yiyun Airport is an under-construction airport located in Shanting district of Zaozhuang City in Shandong Province of East China. Zaozhuang Yiyun Airport is about to operate in 2025.

== See also ==
- List of airports in China
- List of the busiest airports in China
