= Qicun =

Qicun may refer to the following locations in China:

- Qicun, Shahe (綦村镇), town in Hebei
- Qicun, Shaanxi (齐村镇), in Fuping County
- Qicun, Shandong (齐村镇), town in Shizhong District, Zaozhuang
- Qicun, Shanxi (奇村镇), town in Xinfu District, Xinzhou
- Qicun Township (齐村乡), Hebei
