= Dige =

Dige 底阁镇
- Town
- Location in Shandong
- Coordinates: 34°41′50″N 117°48′02″E
- Country: China
- Province: Shandong
- Prefecture-level city: Zaozhuang
- District: Yicheng
- Elevation: 31 m (102 ft)
- Time zone: UTC+8 (China Standard)

Dige (simplified Chinese: 底阁镇; traditional Chinese: 底閣鎮; pinyin: Dǐgé Zhèn) is a town in the south of Shandong province, People's Republic of China, bordering Jiangsu province to the south, and located in the southeast corner of Zaozhuang City. It is under the administration of Yicheng District and is 45 kilometres (28 mi) east-southeast of downtown Zaozhuang. In March 2001, the former Ganlugou Township (甘露沟乡) was merged into the town's administrative area.

== See also ==
- List of township-level divisions of Shandong
