= RSS Intrepid =

One of 6 frigates deployed by the Republic of Singapore Navy(RSN)

- RSS Intrepid in Pearl Harbor on 24 June 2014

History

Singapore
- Name: Intrepid
- Namesake: Intrepid
- Ordered: March 2000
- Builder: ST Engineering
- Launched: 3 July 2004
- Commissioned: 5 February 2008
- Home port: Changi
- Identification: MMSI number: 566011700; Callsign: S6KJ; Pennant number: 69
- Motto: Dare & Do
- Status: Active

General characteristics
- Class & type: Formidable-class frigate
- Displacement: 3,200 tonnes (3,100 long tons; 3,500 short tons)
- Length: 114.8 m (376 ft 8 in)
- Beam: 16.3 m (53 ft 6 in)
- Draught: 6.0 m (19 ft 8 in)
- Installed power: 4 × ISM V1708 diesel generators, each producing 860 kilowatts (1,150 shp); Total output: 3,440 kW (4,610 shp)
- Propulsion: Combined diesel and diesel (CODAD) arrangement; 4 × MTU 20V 8000 M90, each rated at 9,100 kW (12,200 shp); Total output: 36,400 kW (48,800 shp)
- Speed: Maximum: 27 knots (50 km/h; 31 mph); Cruising: 18 kn (33 km/h; 21 mph)
- Range: 4,200 nautical miles (7,800 km)
- Complement: 71, excluding air crew detachment of approx. 19
- Sensors & processing systems: Search radar: Thales Herakles multi-function passive electronically scanned array radar; Navigation radar: Terma Electronic Scanter 2001; Sonar: EDO Model 980 active low frequency towed sonar (ALOFTS)
- Electronic warfare & decoys: ESM: RAFAEL C-PEARL-M; Decoys: Sagem Défense Sécurité New Generation Dagaie System, 2 × forward & 1 × aft; Leonardo Finmeccanica Morpheus anti-torpedo suite with WASS C310 launchers, 2 x aft
- Armament: Anti-ship: 8 (Up to 24) × RGM-84C Harpoon SSMs, to be replaced by Blue Spear SSM; Anti-air: 16-cell Sylver A50 VLS for MBDA Aster 15/30, 16-cell Sylver A43 VLS for MBDA Aster 15; Anti-submarine: 2 × B515 triple tubes with reloads for EuroTorp A244/S Mod 3 torpedoes; Guns: 1x OTO Melara 76mm Super Rapid gun; 4 × STK 50MG 12.7 mm (0.50 in) HMG; 2 × 25mm Mk 38 Mod2 Typhoon Weapon Station Stabilised Gun; Non-lethal: Long-Range Acoustic Device 500 Xtreme (LRAD500X)
- Aircraft carried: 1× S-70B Seahawk multi-mission capable naval helicopter
- Aviation facilities: Flight deck and enclosed hangar for up to two medium-lift helicopters

RSS Intrepid (69) is the second ship of the Formidable-class stealth frigate of the Republic of Singapore Navy.

== Construction and career ==
RSS Intrepid was built by ST Marine Engineering in Singapore around the late 2000s. Intrepid was commissioned on 5 February 2008.

On 15 June 2009, RSS Intrepid, RSS Conqueror, RSS Vigour, RSS Victory, RSS Stalwart, RSS Endeavour, USS Harpers Ferry, USS Chafee and USS Chung-Hoon participated in the joint exercise in the South China Sea.

Singapore, Malaysia, Australia, New Zealand and UK held Exercise Bersama Lima from 2 to 19 October 2018. One of the ships participating was RSS Intrepid.

RSS Intrepid and RSS Sovereignty conducted a joint naval exercise with the People's Liberation Army Navy ships Guiyang and Zaozhuang in the South China Sea on 24 February 2021.

In March 2026, the ship participated in the Royal Australian Navy's Exercise Kakadu Fleet Review on Sydney Harbour.

== Gallery ==
RSS Intrepid Gallery

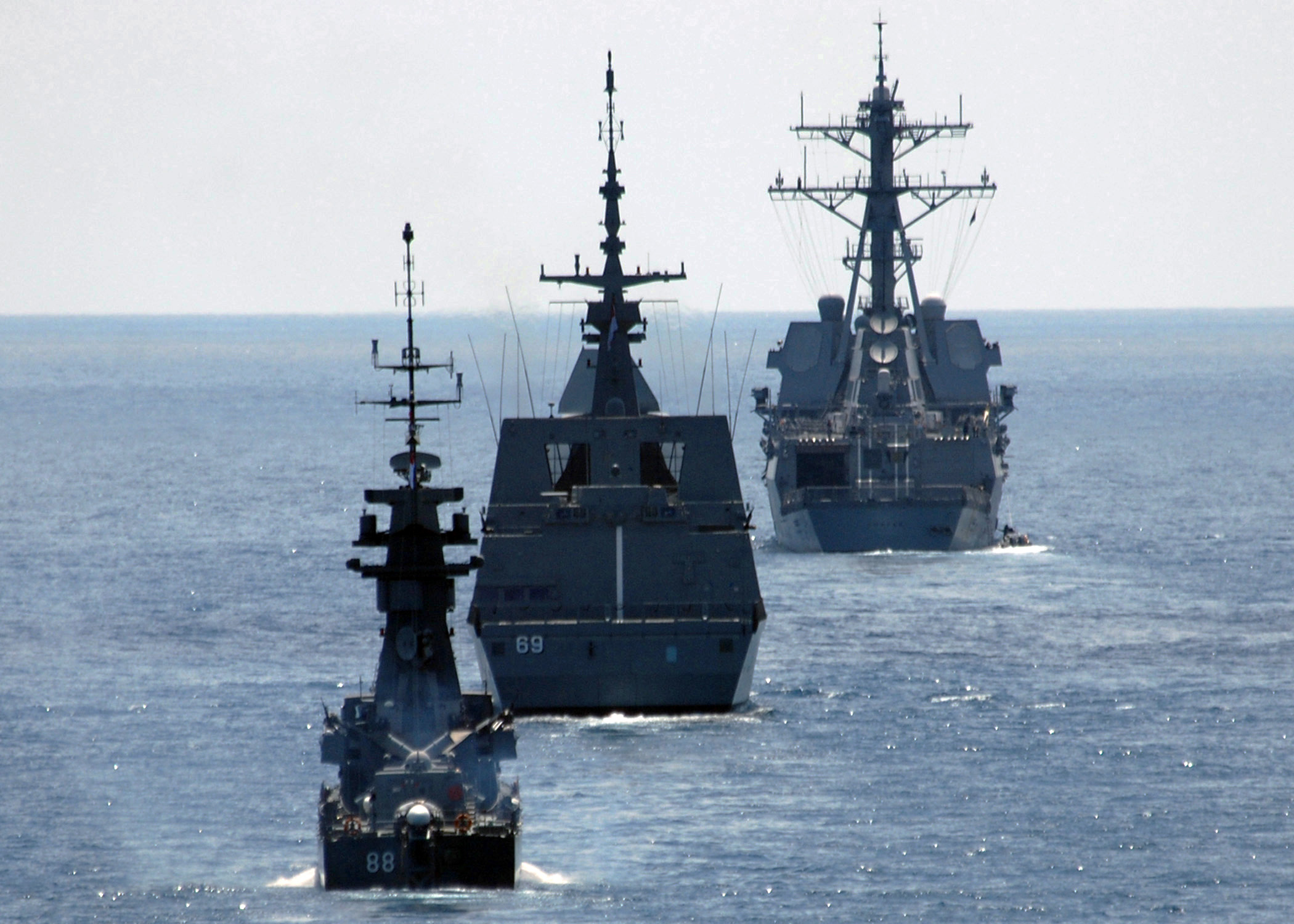
RSS Victory, RSS Intrepid and USS Chafee maneuvers in formation in preparation for a surface gunnery exercise during Cooperation Afloat Readiness and Training (CARAT) 2009.

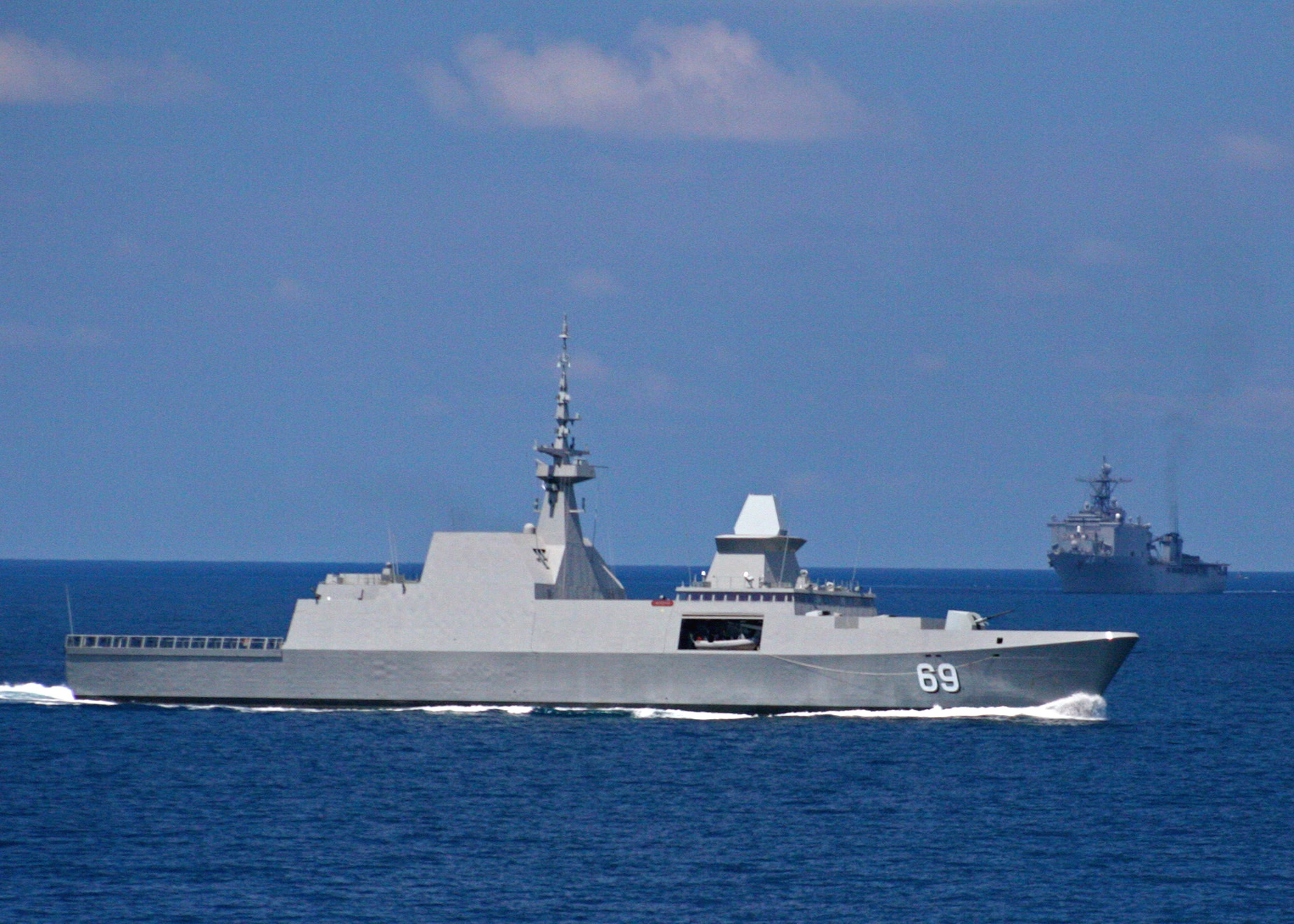
RSS Intrepid and USS Harpers Ferry transits in the background during maneuvers in the Singapore phase of Cooperation Afloat Readiness and Training (CARAT) 2009.

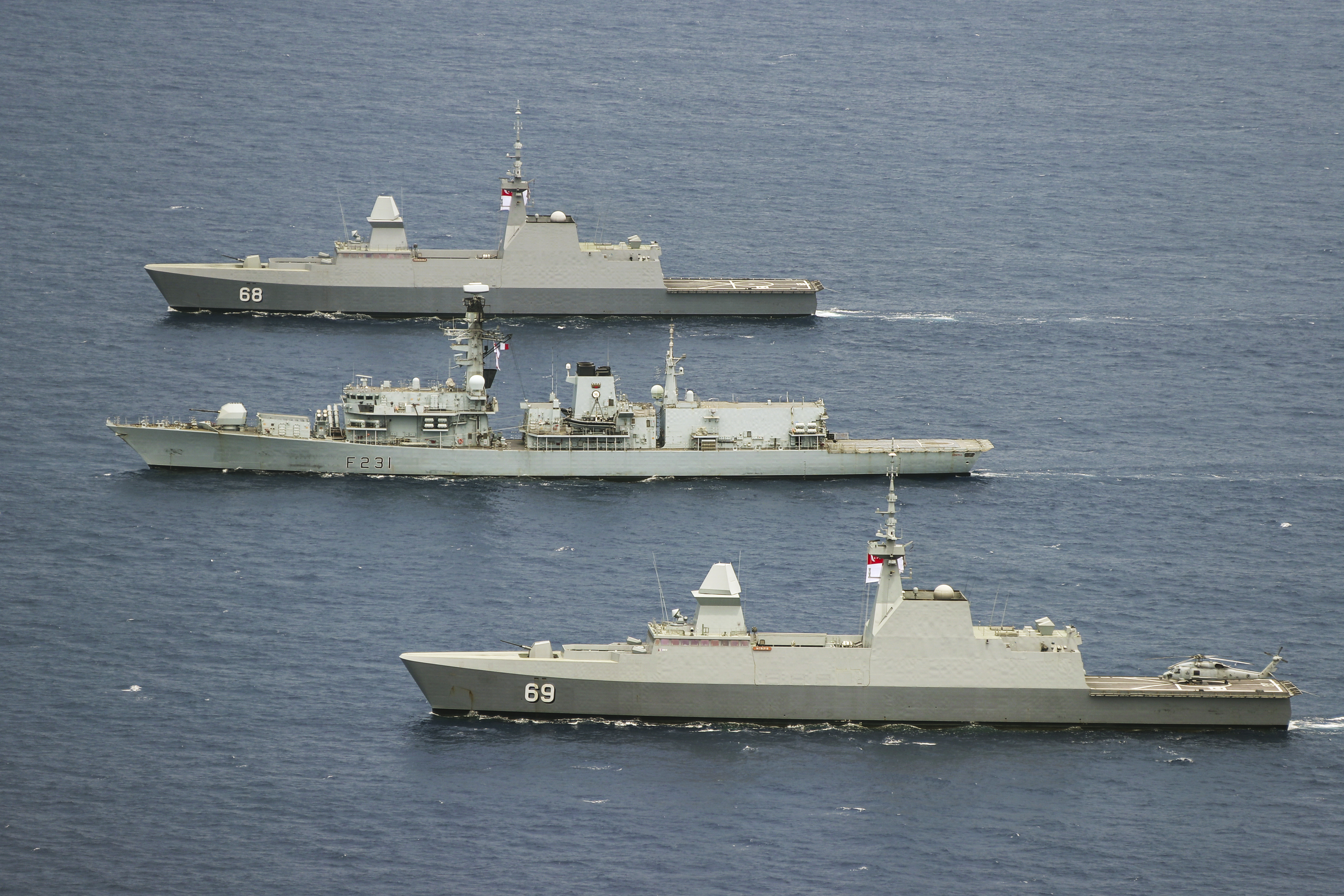
HMS Argyll, RSS Formidable and RSS Intrepid alongside each other during Exercise Bersama Lima 18. 13 October 2018.

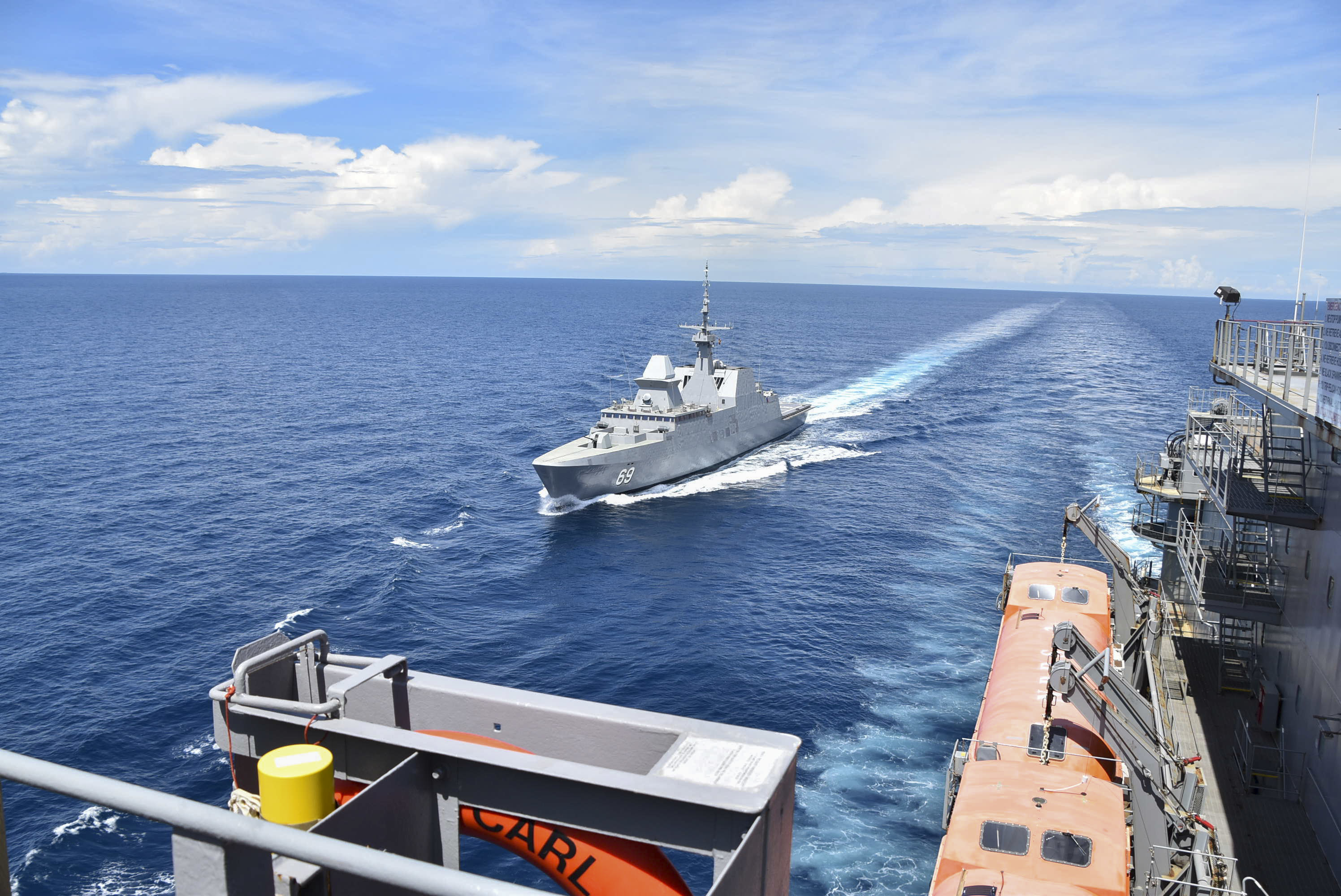
USNS Carl Brashear Conducts an underway replenishment with RSS Intrepid on 16 June 2020
