= Yicheng, Zaozhuang =

Yicheng 峄城区
- District
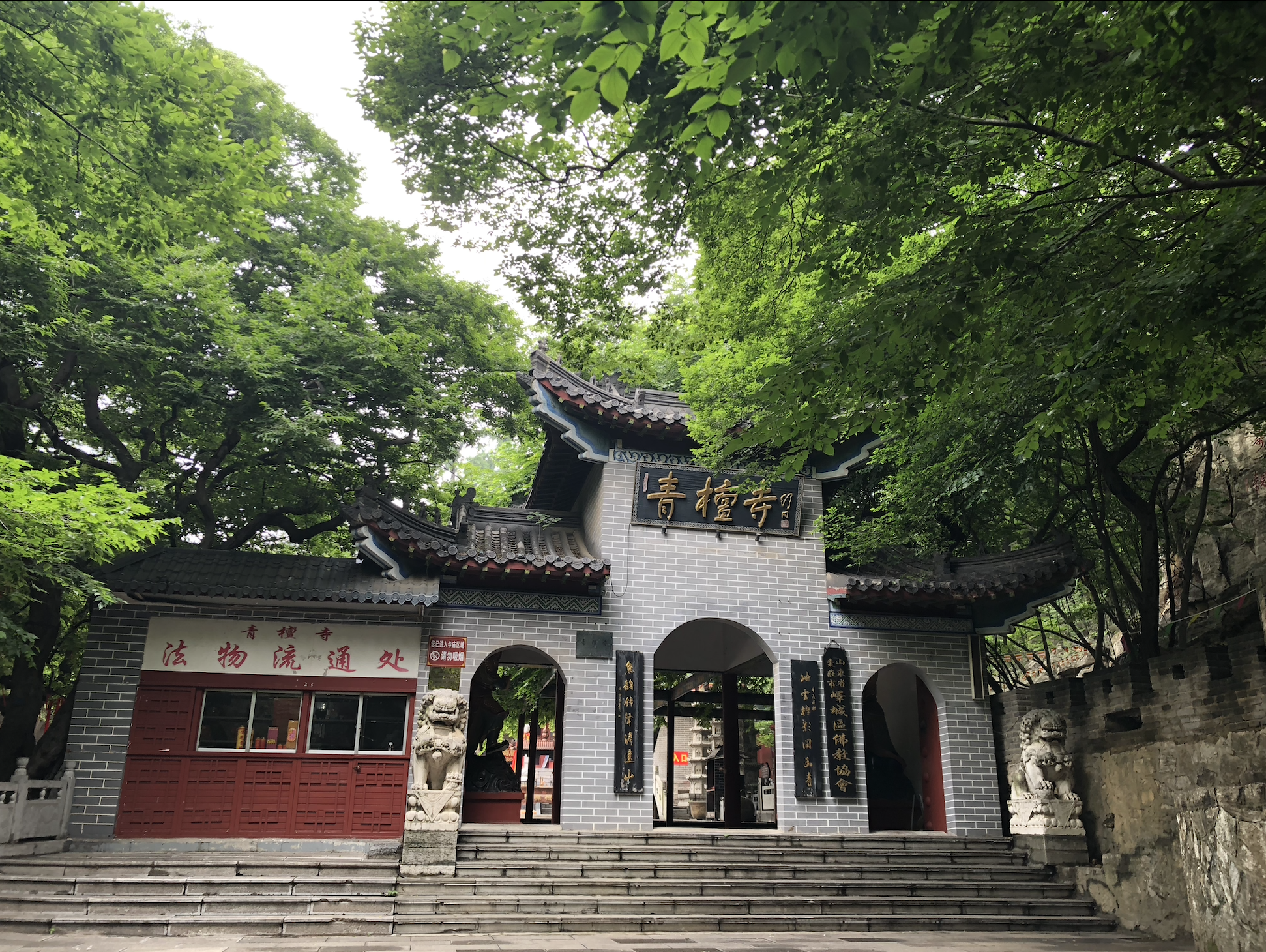
- Qingtan Temple

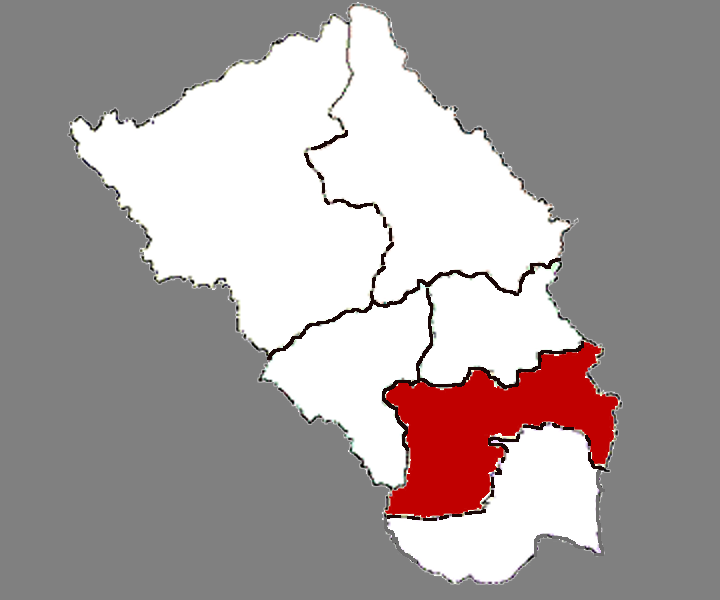
- Location in Zaozhuang

- Location in Shandong
- Coordinates: 34°46′12″N 117°36′00″E
- Country: People's Republic of China
- Province: Shandong
- Prefecture-level city: Zaozhuang

Area
  - Total: 636.8 km^{2} (245.9 sq mi)

Population (2018)
  - Total: 427,542
  - Density: 671.4/km^{2} (1,739/sq mi)
- Time zone: UTC+8 (China Standard)
- Postal code: 277300

Yicheng District (simplified Chinese: 峄城区; traditional Chinese: 嶧城區; pinyin: Yìchéng Qū) is a district of Zaozhuang, Shandong, China. It has an area of 627.6 square kilometres (242.3 sq mi) and around 360,200 inhabitants (2003). As of the end of 2022, the total household population of Yicheng District was 417,086 people.

== Administrative divisions ==
As of October 2022, this district is divided to 2 subdistricts and 5 towns.

Subdistricts

- Tanshan Subdistrict (坛山街道)
- Wulin Subdistrict (吴林街道)

Towns

- Gushao (古邵镇)
- Yinping (阴平镇)
- Dige (底阁镇)
- Liuyuan (榴园镇)
- Eshan (峨山镇)

== Climate ==
Climate data for Yicheng, elevation 61 m (200 ft), (1991–2020 normals, extremes 1981–present)
Month	Jan	Feb	Mar	Apr	May	Jun	Jul	Aug	Sep	Oct	Nov	Dec	Year
Record high °C (°F)	16.7 (62.1)	25.1 (77.2)	31.7 (89.1)	33.8 (92.8)	37.4 (99.3)	39.1 (102.4)	40.0 (104.0)	36.4 (97.5)	34.8 (94.6)	31.4 (88.5)	26.3 (79.3)	19.6 (67.3)	40.0 (104.0)
Mean daily maximum °C (°F)	5.6 (42.1)	8.9 (48.0)	15.2 (59.4)	21.5 (70.7)	26.9 (80.4)	30.9 (87.6)	31.6 (88.9)	30.8 (87.4)	27.4 (81.3)	21.9 (71.4)	14.3 (57.7)	7.4 (45.3)	20.2 (68.4)
Daily mean °C (°F)	0.6 (33.1)	3.6 (38.5)	9.4 (48.9)	15.6 (60.1)	21.2 (70.2)	25.3 (77.5)	27.1 (80.8)	26.5 (79.7)	22.3 (72.1)	16.2 (61.2)	8.9 (48.0)	2.3 (36.1)	14.9 (58.9)
Mean daily minimum °C (°F)	−3.4 (25.9)	−0.7 (30.7)	4.2 (39.6)	10.1 (50.2)	15.8 (60.4)	20.5 (68.9)	23.6 (74.5)	23.1 (73.6)	18.2 (64.8)	11.6 (52.9)	4.5 (40.1)	−1.7 (28.9)	10.5 (50.9)
Record low °C (°F)	−13.3 (8.1)	−12.9 (8.8)	−10.5 (13.1)	−0.8 (30.6)	4.4 (39.9)	11.7 (53.1)	16.3 (61.3)	12.3 (54.1)	7.1 (44.8)	−2.1 (28.2)	−8.0 (17.6)	−13.9 (7.0)	−13.9 (7.0)
Average precipitation mm (inches)	13.7 (0.54)	17.3 (0.68)	17.7 (0.70)	42.0 (1.65)	71.0 (2.80)	116.6 (4.59)	238.6 (9.39)	198.3 (7.81)	73.5 (2.89)	34.7 (1.37)	33.0 (1.30)	17.3 (0.68)	873.7 (34.4)
Average precipitation days (≥ 0.1 mm)	3.6	4.2	4.3	6.3	7.2	7.0	12.8	11.5	8.1	5.9	5.2	3.8	79.9
Average snowy days	3.2	2.7	0.6	0	0	0	0	0	0	0	0.4	1.4	8.3
Average relative humidity (%)	62	62	56	60	64	67	80	80	73	69	68	64	67
Mean monthly sunshine hours	131.4	135.7	194.8	214.2	228.0	187.7	160.9	164.7	157.4	157.5	143.6	143.9	2,019.8
Percentage possible sunshine	42	44	52	54	53	43	37	40	43	45	47	47	46
Source: China Meteorological Administration

Yicheng District belongs to the warm temperate semi-humid monsoon climate zone.The four seasons are distinct, the monsoon is obvious, rain and heat in the same season.

== Transportation ==
Yicheng District has convenient transportation by water, land and air, and the Beijing-Hangzhou Grand Canal, known as the "Golden Waterway", passes through the southern part of the city.It is adjacent to the coastal ports of Qingdao, Rizhao, Lanshan and Lianyungang. It is close to Beijing-Shanghai Railway, Beijing-Shanghai Expressway, Beijing-Fuzhou Expressway, National Highway 206 and Beijing-Shanghai High-speed Railway running north and south.

== Culture ==
=== Main tourist attractions ===
Guanshi Pomegranate Garden Ecological and Cultural Tourism Zone, there are more than 5.3 million pomegranate trees with 48 varieties, which were built in the year of Emperor Chengdi of Western Han Dynasty, and it is the largest pomegranate garden in China. It has been certified as the "Guinness Most", and thus known as the "Guan Shi Pomegranate Garden", which is a provincial scenic spot and a national 4A level scenic spot. It is a comprehensive tourist area integrating natural mountains and rivers, ecological gardens, folklore and religion, sightseeing tours and leisure vacations.

Qingtan Temple, located at the east of Guan Shi Durian Garden, it is a national AAAA level tourist attraction, the first batch of national agricultural tourism demonstration sites, provincial scenic spots, key cultural relics protection units in Shandong Province and so on.In the scenic area, there are attractions such as Qingdan Lake, thousand-year old sandalwood, Calligraphy Monument Gallery, Pagoda of Repayment, and Zangwang Palace.

=== Cuisine ===
Lamb soup, the main ingredients for making the soup are lamb, chili oil, pepper and salt, and the soup is white.

Garnet, China Geographical Indication Product.There are dozens of varieties, such as Big Green Peel, Rock Sugar Seed, Big Red Robe, etc., and "Big Green Peel" is the main planting variety, which also has ornamental value.

Shandong Jujube, jujube industry is one of the characteristic forest and fruit industries in Yicheng District. It has high edible and medicinal value.
