= Tengzhou East railway station =

Railway station in Tengzhou, China

Tengzhoudong 滕州东
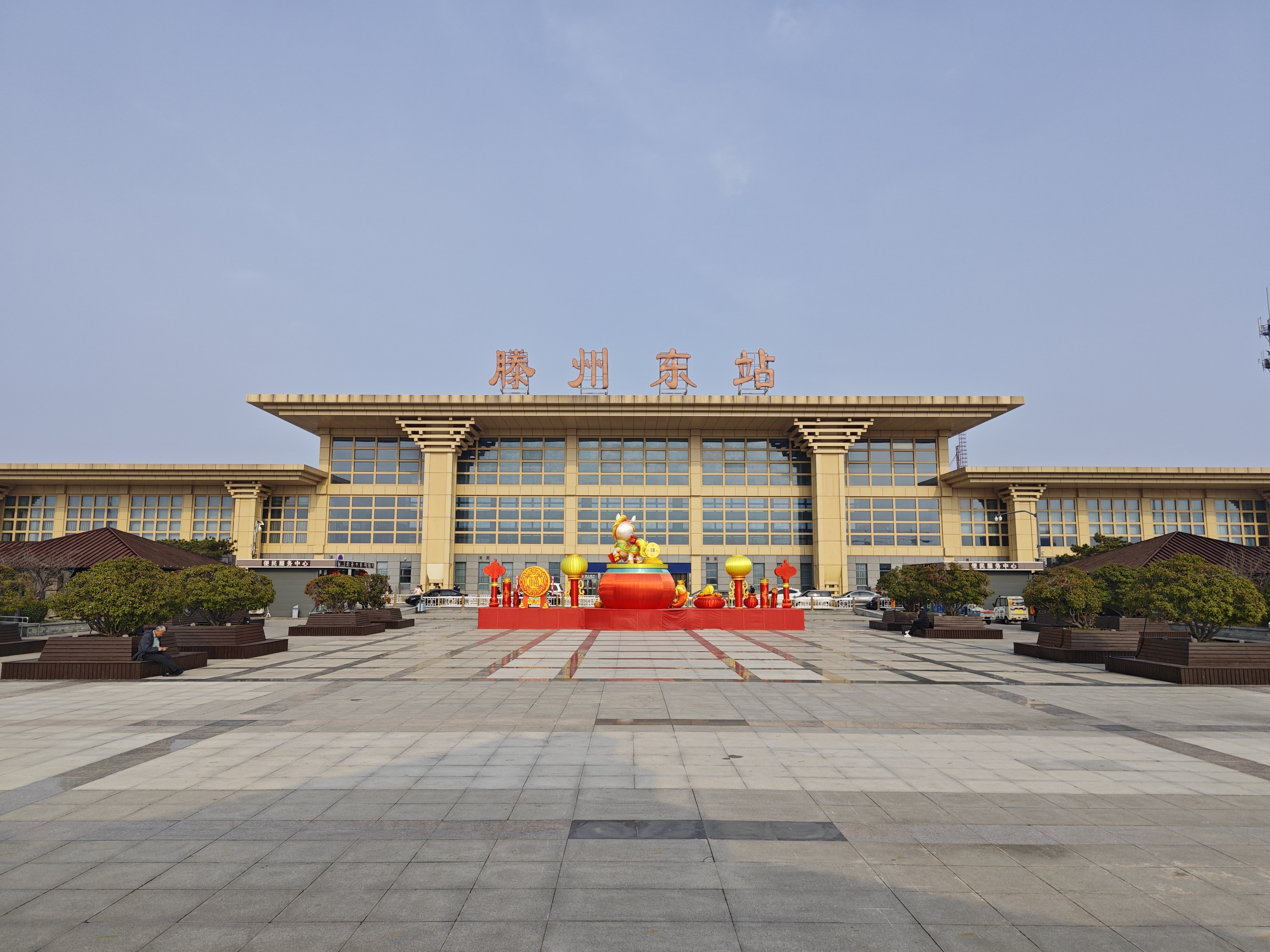
- Station Building

General information
- Other names: Tengzhou East
- Location: Tengzhou, Zaozhuang, Shandong; China
- Coordinates: 35°5′27.73″N 117°15′8.52″E
- Operated by: China Railway Jinan Group; China Railway Corporation
- Lines: Beijing–Shanghai high-speed railway Jinan–Zaozhuang high-speed railway (Under Construction)

Other information
- Station code: TMIS code: 66824; Telegraph code: TEK; Pinyin code: TZD
- Classification: 1st class station

History
- Opened: July 1, 2010
Location

The Tengzhou East railway station (simplified Chinese: 滕州东站; traditional Chinese: 滕州東站) is a high-speed railway station in Tengzhou, Zaozhuang, Shandong, People's Republic of China. It is served by the Beijing–Shanghai high-speed railway. It will be served by Jinan–Zaozhuang high-speed railway in 2027.

Preceding station	China Railway High-speed	Following station
Qufu East towards Beijing South or Tianjin West	Beijing–Shanghai high-speed railway Part of the Beijing–Fuzhou high-speed railway	Zaozhuang towards Shanghai Hongqiao
