= Shanting, Zaozhuang =

Shanting 山亭区
- District
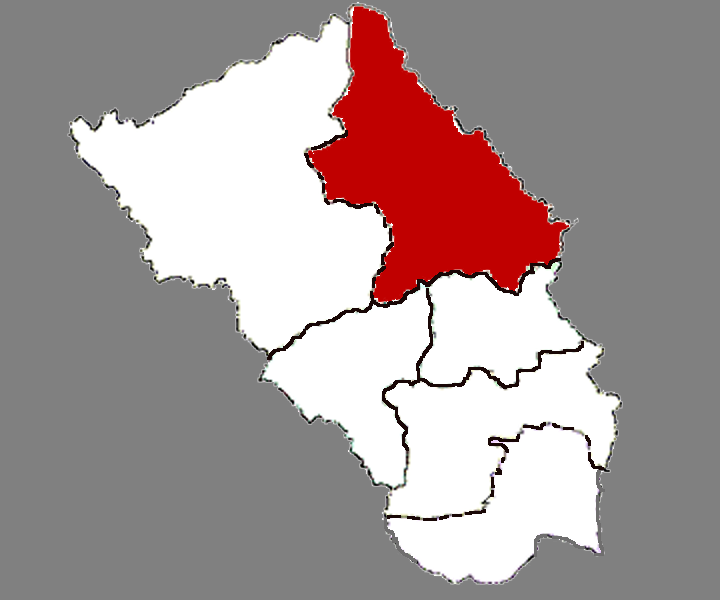
- Location in Zaozhuang

- Location in Shandong
- Coordinates: 35°06′00″N 117°27′43″E
- Country: People's Republic of China
- Province: Shandong
- Prefecture-level city: Zaozhuang

Area
  - Total: 1,019.2 km^{2} (393.5 sq mi)

Population (2016)
  - Total: 528,600
  - Density: 518.6/km^{2} (1,343/sq mi)
- Time zone: UTC+8 (China Standard)
- Postal code: 277200

Shanting (Chinese: 山亭; pinyin: Shāntíng) is a district of the city of Zaozhuang, Shandong province, China.

As of the end of 2022, Shanting District had a household population of 523,900 people.

== Administrative divisions ==
As of 2012, this district is divided to 1 subdistrict, 8 towns and 1 township.

Subdistricts

- Shancheng Subdistrict (山城街道)

Towns

- Dianzi (店子镇)
- Xiji (西集镇)
- Sangcun (桑村镇)
- Beizhuang (北庄镇)
- Chengtou (城头镇)
- Xuzhuang (徐庄镇)
- Shuiquan (水泉镇)
- Fengmao (冯卯镇)

Townships

- Fucheng Township (凫城乡)

== Geography ==
The topography of Shanting District is high in the east and low in the west, showing a natural inclination, with a low hilly mountainous area at an altitude of about 500 meters in the east and an alluvial plain at an altitude of less than 100 meters in the west. The three highest peaks in the city, namely Yiyun Mountain, Motian Ridge and Baodu Gu, are all located in Shanting. The area of mountains and hills within the territory is 1.34 million acres, and the plain area is 136,000 acres. The total area is 1019 square kilometers.

== Climate ==
Shanting has a temperate monsoon continental climate, which is regulated and influenced by the ocean to a certain extent and is rich in climate resources. It has the characteristics of suitable climate, distinct four seasons, abundant rainfall, high temperature, sufficient sunlight, and long frost-free period.

== Transportation ==
At the end of 2021, the total mileage of highways in Shanting District was 1,705.2 kilometers, with a density of 167.5 kilometers/100 square kilometers. These include two expressways, 1 national highway, 6 provincial roads, 15 county roads, 37 rural roads, 4 special roads and 1,920 village roads.

== Tourism ==
=== Baodugu National Forest Park ===
It is known as "the best Gu in the world" and rated as "the first of the top ten wonders" in Zaozhuang. It is an AAAA-level scenic spot that integrates a national forest park, a national water conservancy scenic spot, and a national agricultural tourism demonstration site.

=== Xiong'er Mountain National Geopark ===
Located in Beizhuang Town, it runs east–west. The main peak looks like a big bear's ear from a distance, so it is called Xiong'er Mountain (熊耳山). Xiong'er Mountain National Geopark is a Gu-type group in the southern part of Taiyi Mountains. It is an "AAAA-level" scenic spot with Xiong'er Mountain as the main body and integrated with natural landscapes such as Cluster Gu, Shuanglong Rift Valley, Crouching Tiger Cave, Longzhu Cliff, and collapsed geological disaster relics. It is known as "China's holy scene, the only one in Shandong, and the most unique mountain in China".

=== Yiyun Stone Tribe Tourism Resort ===
Yiyun Stone Tribe Tourism Resort is located in Xinglongzhuang Village, a national "AAAA-level"tourist attraction. It mainly takes the stone house, Yiyun Mountain and Yiyun Lake as the core, integrates the folk history of southern Shandong, and uses elements such as mountains, water, and villages. It will be developed into a comprehensive tourist resort that integrates the functions of Shibanfang Mountain Village exploration, folk culture experience, pastoral farming, suburban landscape vacation and landscape recreation, business meetings, and outdoor camping.

=== Hannuo Manor ===
Located at the foot of Yiyun Mountain, covering an area of 2,000 acres, is the Otehanno Wine Castle, Grape Sightseeing Corridor, European Musical Fountain, Underground Wine Cellar, Hot Spring SPA Club, Hannuo Greenway, etc. This is a diversified large-scale leisure resort in Zaozhuang City that integrates grape cultivation, wine brewing, hot spring bathing, leisure tourism, catering reception, ecological agriculture sightseeing and tennis sports.

== Culture ==
=== Shancheng Zanthoxylum bungeanum ===
This is a specialty of Shancheng streets. Yiyunshan Zanthoxylum bungeanum from Shancheng Street was recognized as a “pollution-free agricultural product” by the Agricultural Products Quality and Safety Center of the Ministry of Agriculture.It has also been recognized as a "Green Food Grade A Product" by the China Green Food Development Center.

=== Sangchon Stone Ground Pancakes ===
This is a specialty of Sangcun Town with a long history. The pancakes are made from pollution-free, pollution-free high-quality wheat, millet and other grains as the main raw materials, and are supplemented with soybeans, sesame, peanuts, chestnuts, walnuts and other raw materials.

=== Hongmen Grapes ===
Specialty of Shanting District, National Geographical Indication of Agricultural Products.

=== Shanting "Fire Cherries" ===
Specialty of Shuiquan Town, Shanting District, China National Geographical Indication Product. On December 10, 2010, the former State General Administration of Quality Supervision approved the implementation of geographical indication product protection for "Fire Cherries". On June 4, 2021, the Ministry of Agriculture and Rural Development officially approved the registration and protection of "Fire Cherries".

=== Vole earthenware ===
Specialty of Dianzi Town, Shanting District, China National Geographical Indication Product. On July 12, 2013, the former General Administration of Quality Supervision, Inspection and Quarantine (AQSIQ) approved the implementation of geographical indications product protection for "Vole earthenware".
