= Xuecheng District =

Xuecheng District 薛城区
- District
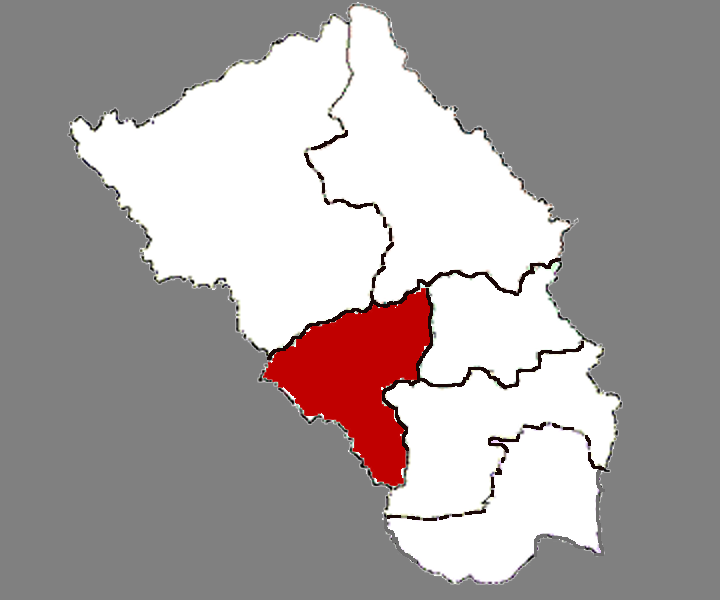
- Location in Zaozhuang

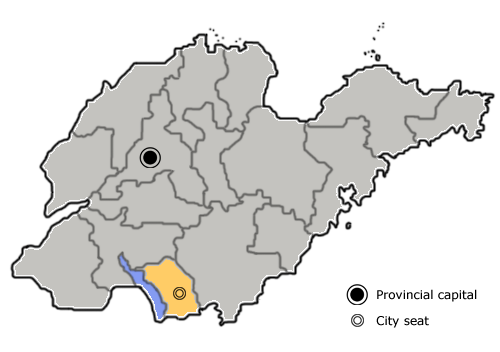
- Zaozhuang in Shandong
- Coordinates: 34°46′28″N 117°15′05″E
- Country: People's Republic of China
- Province: Shandong
- Prefecture-level city: Zaozhuang

Area
  - Total: 423.02 km^{2} (163.33 sq mi)

Population (2016)
  - Total: 462,500
  - Density: 1,093/km^{2} (2,832/sq mi)
- Time zone: UTC+8 (China Standard)
- Postal code: 277000

Xuecheng (Chinese: 薛城区; pinyin: Xuēchéng Qū) is a district and the seat of Zaozhuang, Shandong province, China, ever named by "lin cheng". It has an area of 506.72 km^{2} and around 405,285 inhabitants (2003). As of the end of 2022, the resident population of Xuecheng District was 485,637. As of May 2022, Xuecheng District has five streets and four towns under its jurisdiction, with the district government stationed at No. 2 Yongfu Middle Road. Xuecheng is the hometown of national suona, national paper-cutting hometown, national martial arts hometown, national advanced district of mass culture, the birthplace of Shandong Express Scripts, the hometown of Xi Zhong, the originator of car-making, and the hometown of railroad guerrillas.

== Administrative divisions ==
As of 2012, this district is divided to 3 subdistricts and 6 towns.

It also plans to prepare for the establishment of Jushan Subdistricts (巨山街道) in Xuecheng District.

Subdistricts

- Lincheng Subdistrict (临城街道)
- Xingren Subdistrict (兴仁街道)
- Xingcheng Subdistrict (兴城街道)

Towns

- Shagou (沙沟镇)
- Zhouying (周营镇)
- Zouwu (邹坞镇)
- Taozhuang (陶庄镇)
- Changzhuang (常庄镇)
- Zhangfan (张范镇)

In 2019, Changzhuang Town (常庄镇) was abolished and Changzhuang Subdistrict (常庄街道) was established.

In 2020, Jusan Subdistrict (巨山街道) was renamed Xincheng Subdistrict (新城街道).

As of May 2022, Xuecheng District has five Subdistricts and four towns under its jurisdiction.

== Climate ==
Climate data for Xuecheng, elevation 45 m (148 ft), (1991–2020 normals, extremes 1981–present)
| Month | Jan | Feb | Mar | Apr | May | Jun | Jul | Aug | Sep | Oct | Nov | Dec | Year |
|---|---|---|---|---|---|---|---|---|---|---|---|---|---|
| Record high °C (°F) | 16.7 (62.1) | 25.0 (77.0) | 30.5 (86.9) | 33.2 (91.8) | 37.9 (100.2) | 38.0 (100.4) | 39.9 (103.8) | 37.0 (98.6) | 35.5 (95.9) | 32.0 (89.6) | 25.9 (78.6) | 21.1 (70.0) | 39.9 (103.8) |
| Mean daily maximum °C (°F) | 5.5 (41.9) | 8.8 (47.8) | 15.1 (59.2) | 21.4 (70.5) | 26.9 (80.4) | 30.9 (87.6) | 31.7 (89.1) | 30.8 (87.4) | 27.3 (81.1) | 21.7 (71.1) | 14.1 (57.4) | 7.1 (44.8) | 20.1 (68.2) |
| Daily mean °C (°F) | 1.2 (34.2) | 4.1 (39.4) | 9.9 (49.8) | 16.0 (60.8) | 21.6 (70.9) | 25.8 (78.4) | 27.4 (81.3) | 26.7 (80.1) | 22.7 (72.9) | 16.9 (62.4) | 9.6 (49.3) | 3.0 (37.4) | 15.4 (59.7) |
| Mean daily minimum °C (°F) | −2.1 (28.2) | 0.5 (32.9) | 5.5 (41.9) | 11.3 (52.3) | 16.9 (62.4) | 21.4 (70.5) | 24.0 (75.2) | 23.4 (74.1) | 18.9 (66.0) | 12.9 (55.2) | 6.0 (42.8) | −0.3 (31.5) | 11.5 (52.8) |
| Record low °C (°F) | −12.6 (9.3) | −12.2 (10.0) | −9.3 (15.3) | −0.5 (31.1) | 4.7 (40.5) | 12.4 (54.3) | 16.5 (61.7) | 12.9 (55.2) | 6.8 (44.2) | −1.0 (30.2) | −8.5 (16.7) | −12.4 (9.7) | −12.6 (9.3) |
| Average precipitation mm (inches) | 13.2 (0.52) | 16.8 (0.66) | 18.1 (0.71) | 38.4 (1.51) | 66.4 (2.61) | 85.0 (3.35) | 239.5 (9.43) | 185.5 (7.30) | 72.7 (2.86) | 33.2 (1.31) | 32.7 (1.29) | 16.2 (0.64) | 817.7 (32.19) |
| Average precipitation days (≥ 0.1 mm) | 3.6 | 4.4 | 4.3 | 6.2 | 6.3 | 7.4 | 12.8 | 12.0 | 7.3 | 6.0 | 5.5 | 4.0 | 79.8 |
| Average snowy days | 3.0 | 2.6 | 0.5 | 0 | 0 | 0 | 0 | 0 | 0 | 0 | 0.5 | 1.3 | 7.9 |
| Average relative humidity (%) | 60 | 59 | 55 | 58 | 62 | 65 | 79 | 79 | 72 | 65 | 65 | 62 | 65 |
| Mean monthly sunshine hours | 133.6 | 137.0 | 193.2 | 212.6 | 226.1 | 197.3 | 176.7 | 171.8 | 162.1 | 161.1 | 146.3 | 145.7 | 2,063.5 |
| Percentage possible sunshine | 43 | 44 | 52 | 54 | 52 | 46 | 40 | 42 | 44 | 46 | 48 | 48 | 47 |
Source: China Meteorological Administration

Xuecheng District belongs to the warm temperate monsoon continental climate, with significant continental climate characteristics.

== Geography ==
Xuecheng District, located in the south of Shandong Province, on the shore of Weishan Lake, with a total area of 422.71 square kilometers, is the resident of the People's Government of Zaozhuang City.

Xuecheng District is located in the hilly area of Lunan and the Jianghuai Plain.The terrain is divided into three categories: plains, hills and depressions.The plains account for 50% of the total area, the hills for 34.1%, and the floodplains for 15.9%, with the lowest point being Panjiaduokou.

== Transportation ==
The railroad section in Xuecheng District has Beijing-Shanghai Railway and Xuezao Railway.

The highway section has Zaohe Expressway, Jingtai Expressway, S318 Tanlan Line, S238 Dianhan Line, and National Highway 518.

== Main tourist attractions ==
Zaozhuang People's Heroes Memorial Park (枣庄市人民英雄纪念园)，located in Rinsan Park, there is the Martyrs' Memorial Wall, the Martyrs' Memorial Stonehenge, and a monument labeled "People's Heroes Forever"(人民英雄永垂不朽).

Ling Shan Pavilion (临山阁)，by the pedestal, the main attic, helmet top three parts, five layers, four eaves, Song-style architectural style.

Zhong Chen Hao kiln site (中郝窑址)，created in the North and South Dynasties, through the Ming and Qing Dynasties for more than 1500 years, the main products are handmade antique ceramics made of kaolin clay.In 2006, it was selected as one of the sixth batch of national key cultural relics protection units.
