= Shizhong, Zaozhuang =

Shizhong 市中区
- District
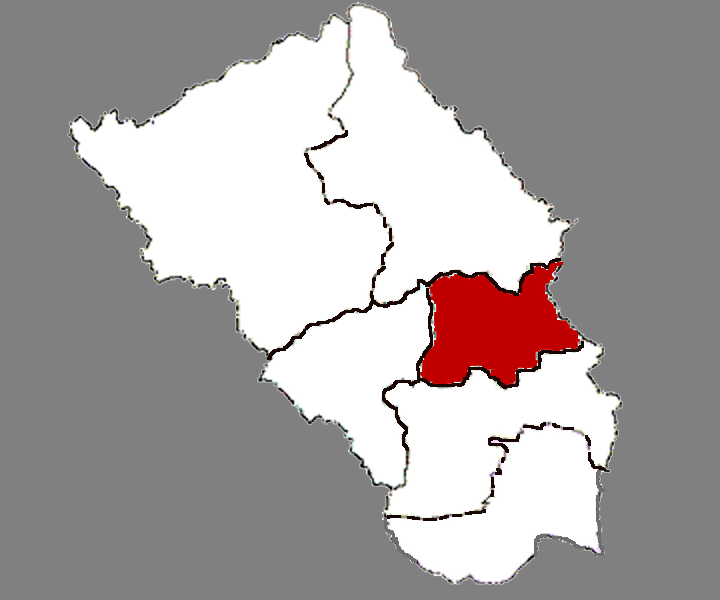
- Location in Zaozhuang

- Location in Shandong
- Coordinates: 34°51′51″N 117°33′22″E
- Country: People's Republic of China
- Province: Shandong
- Prefecture-level city: Zaozhuang

Area
  - Total: 280 km^{2} (110 sq mi)

Population (2018)
  - Total: 736,000
  - Density: 2,600/km^{2} (6,800/sq mi)
- Time zone: UTC+8 (China Standard)
- Postal code: 250002

Shizhong District (Chinese: 市中区; pinyin: Shìzhōng Qū; lit. 'city center') is a district of the city of Zaozhuang, Shandong province, China.

== Administrative divisions ==
As of 2012, this district is divided into 6 subdistricts, 3 towns and 2 townships.

Subdistricts

- Zhongxinjie Subdistrict (中心街街道)
- Getabu Subdistrict (各塔埠街道)
- Kuangqu Subdistrict (矿区街道)
- Wenhualu Subdistrict (文化路街道)
- Longshanlu Subdistrict (龙山路街道)
- Guangminglu Subdistrict (光明路街道)

Towns

- Shuiguo (税郭镇)
- Mengzhuang (孟庄镇)
- Qicun (齐村镇)

Townships

- Yong'an Township (永安乡)
- Xiwangzhuang Township (西王庄乡)
