= Zaozhuang =

Zaozhuang 枣庄市 Tsaochwang
- Prefecture-level city
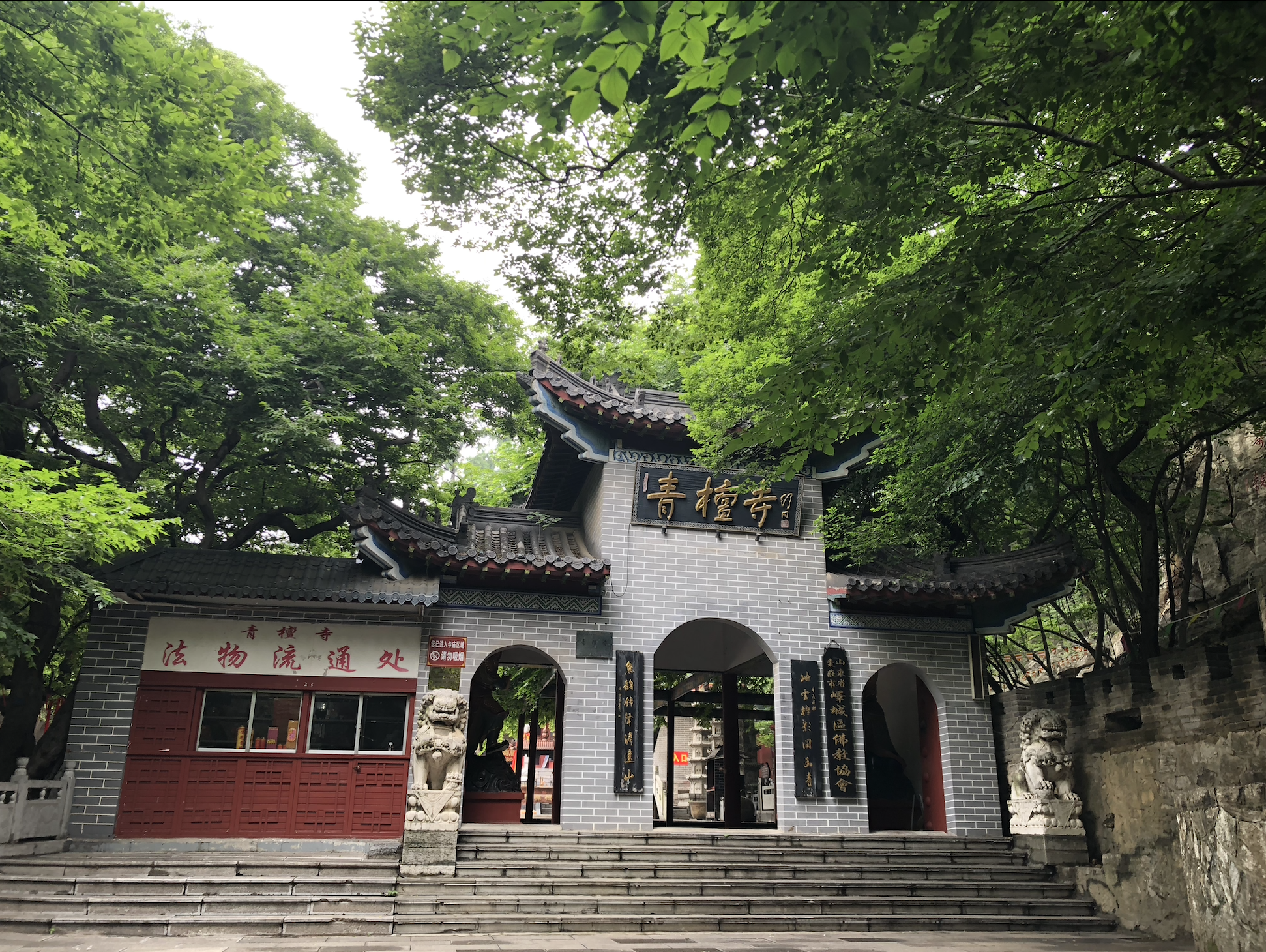
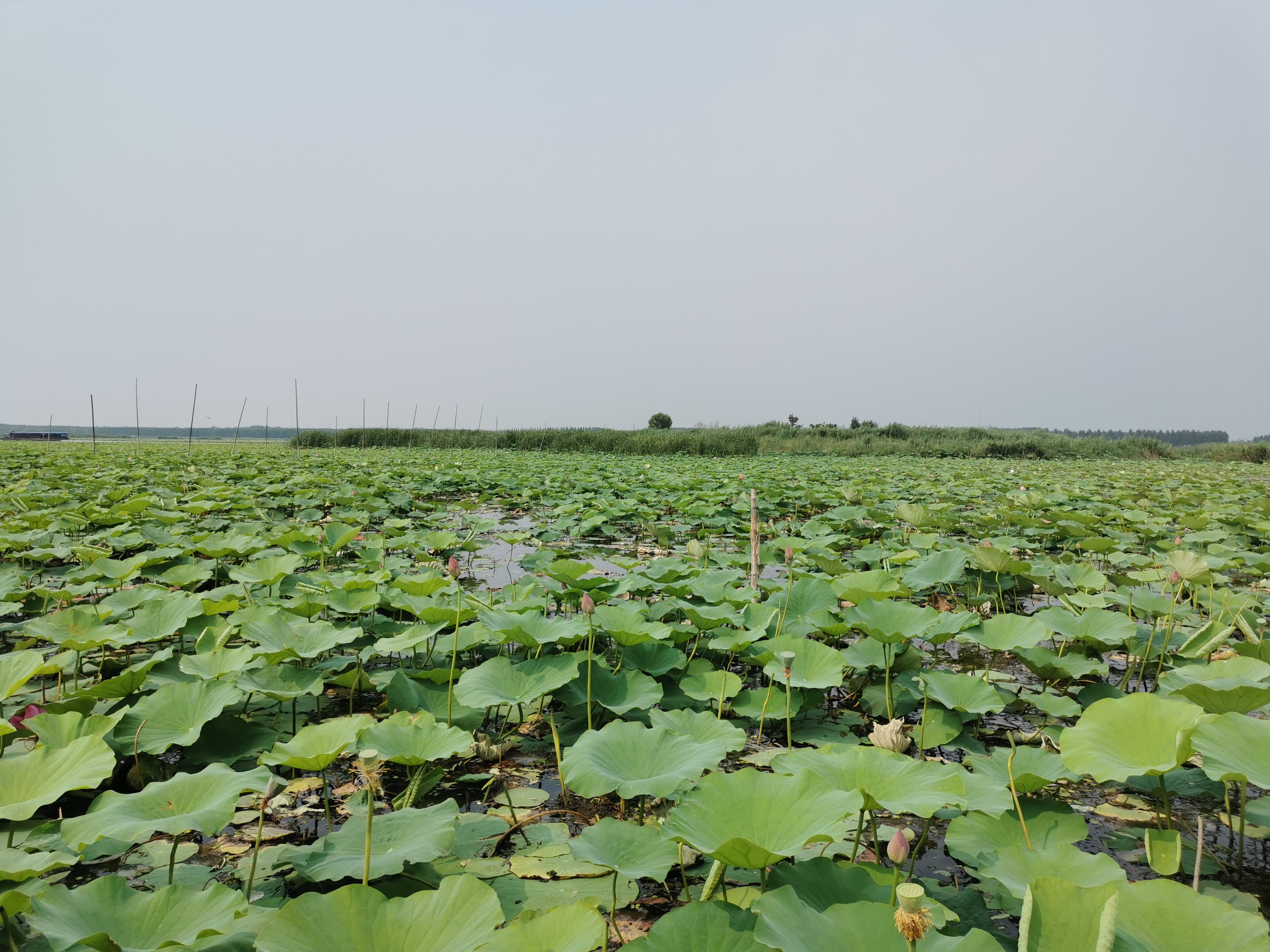
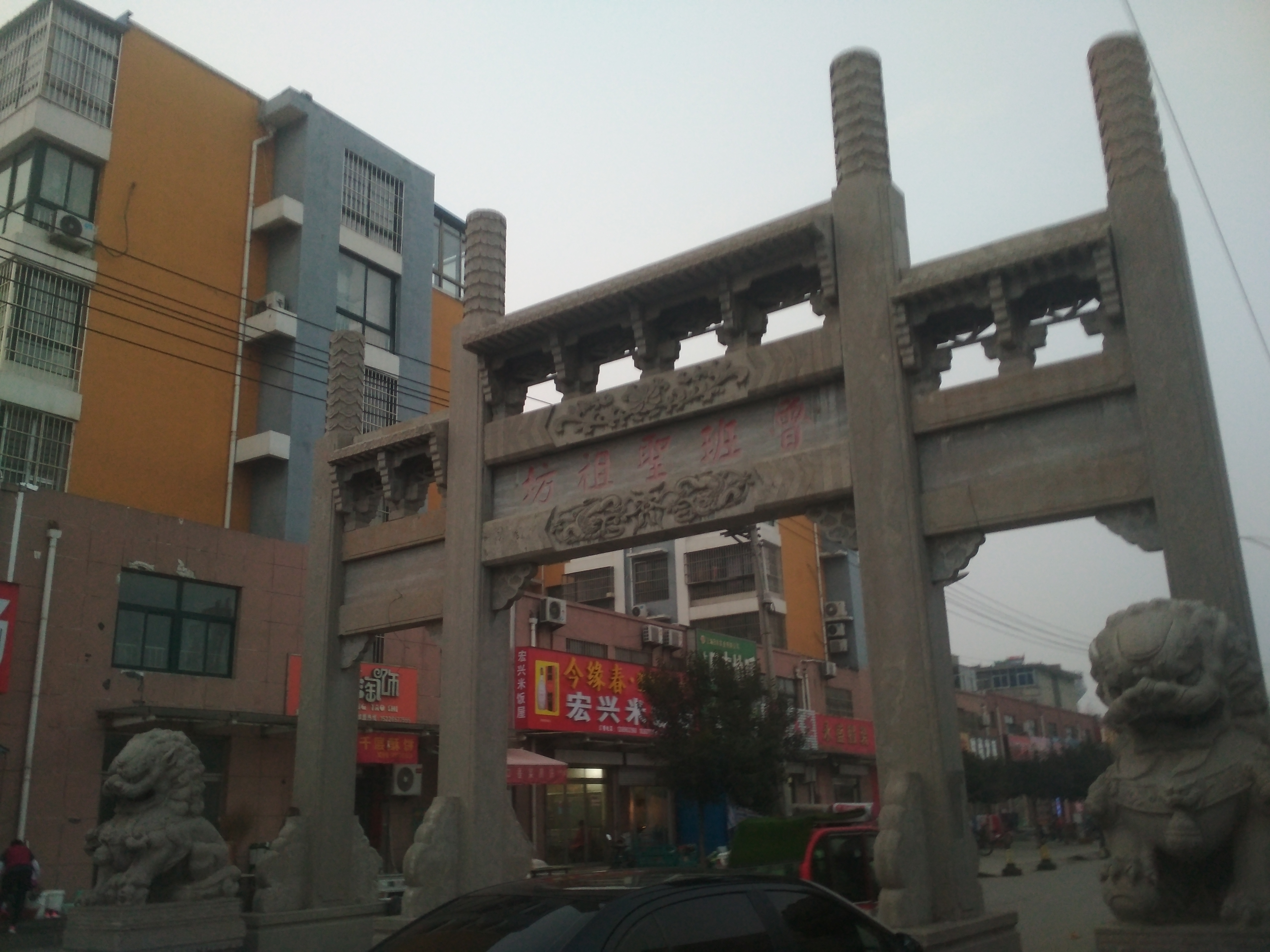
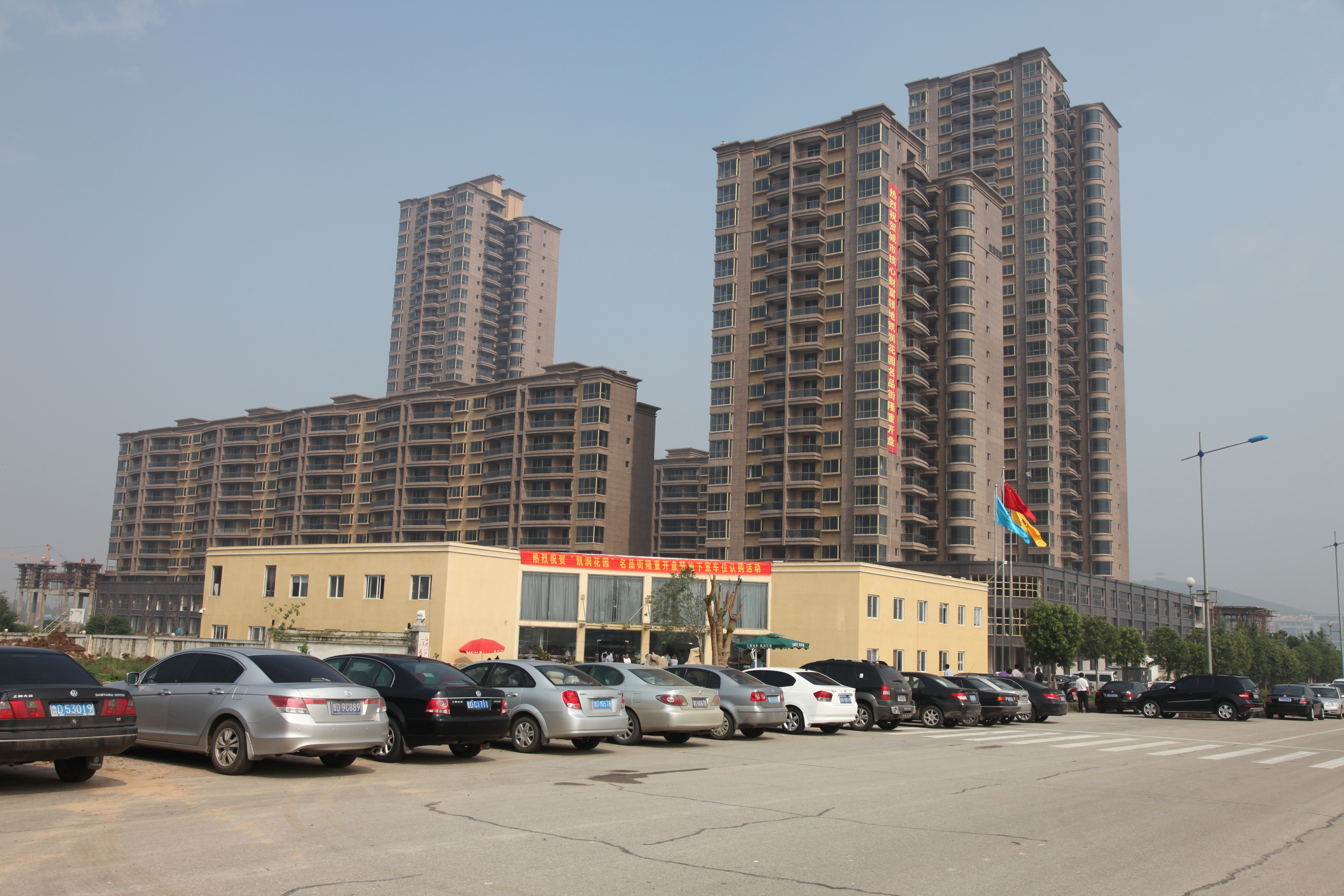
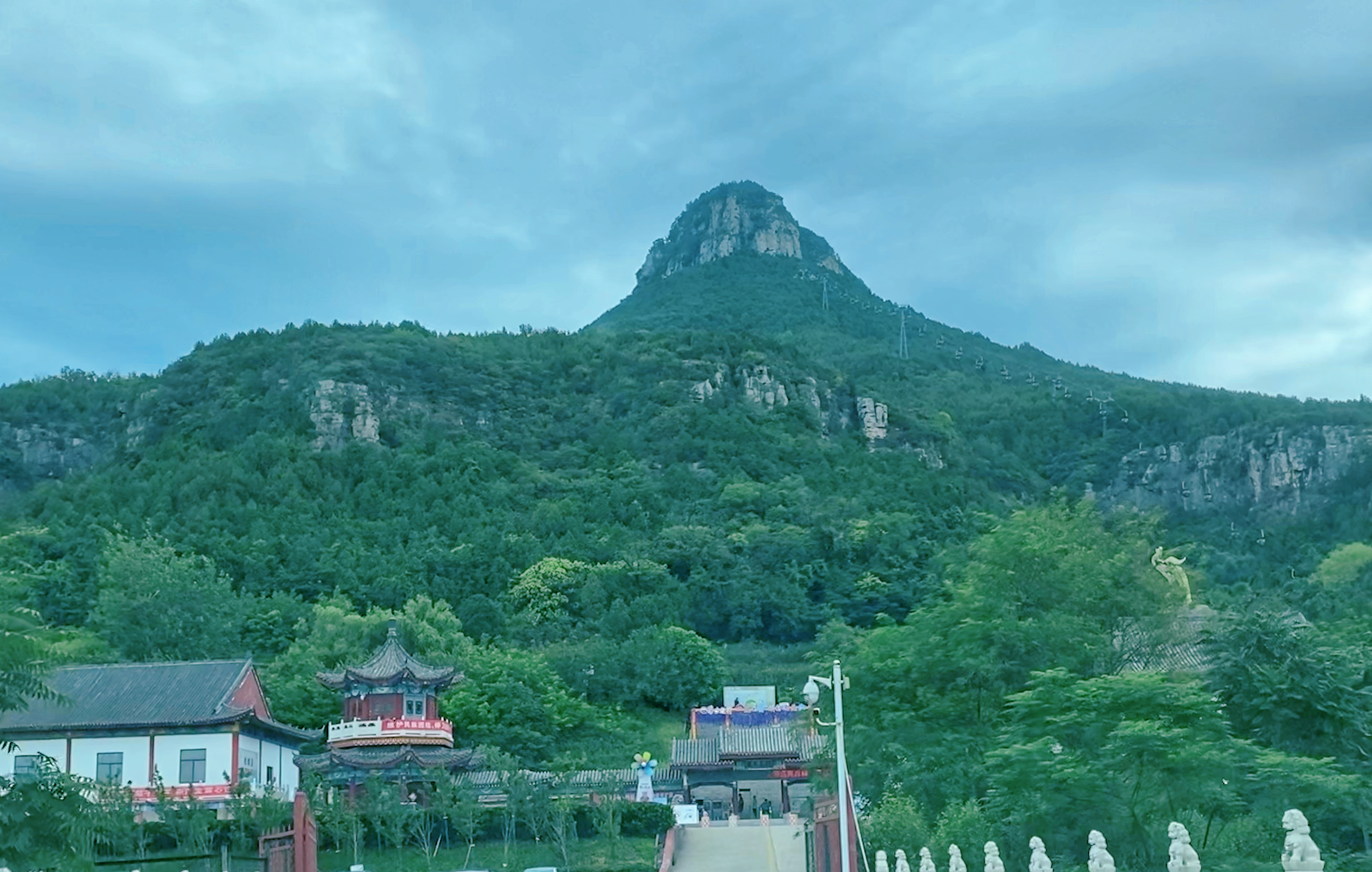
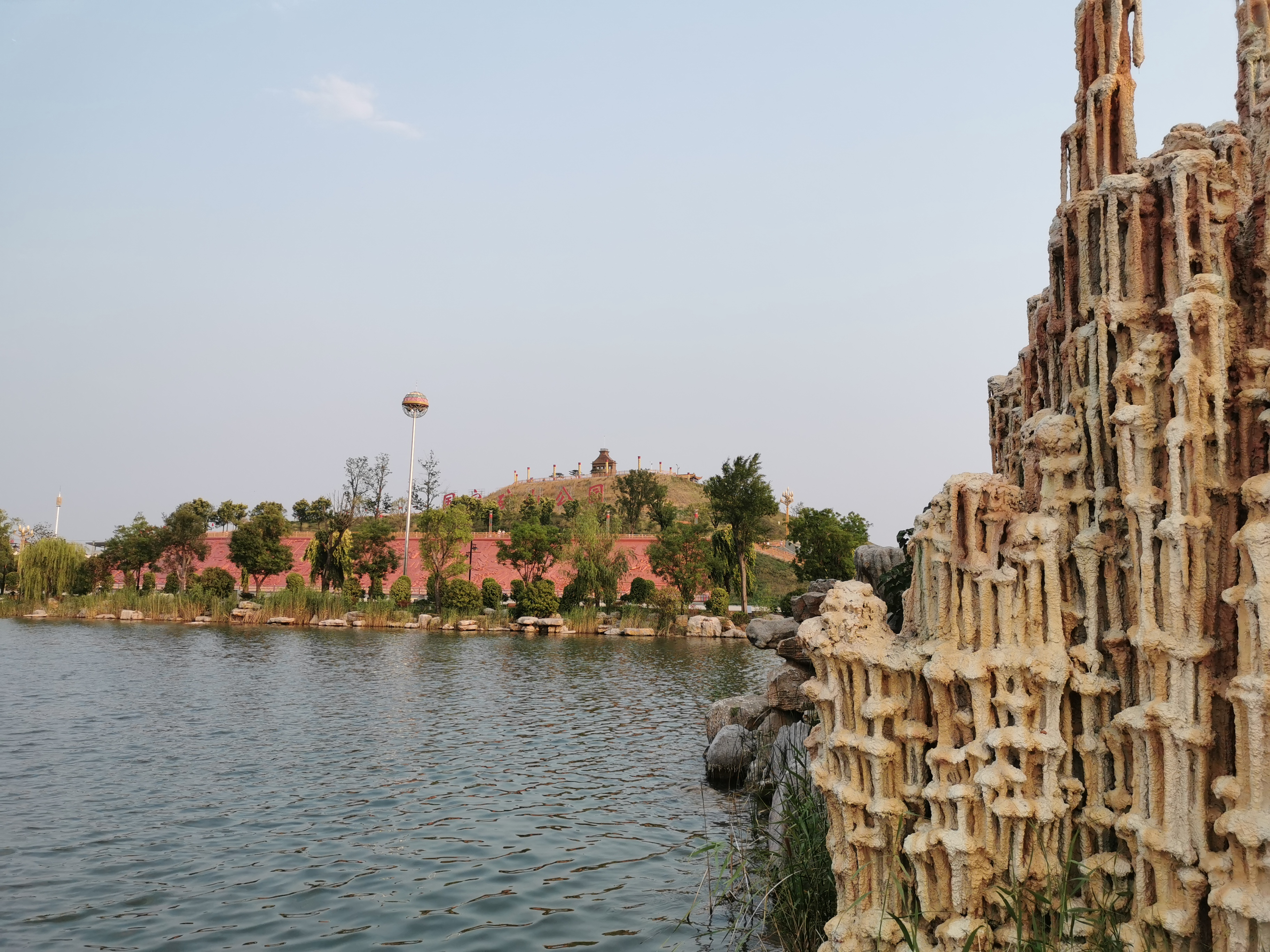
- Qingtan Temple Weishan Lake Lu Ban's Home Xuecheng Baodugu National Forest Park Zhongxing Square

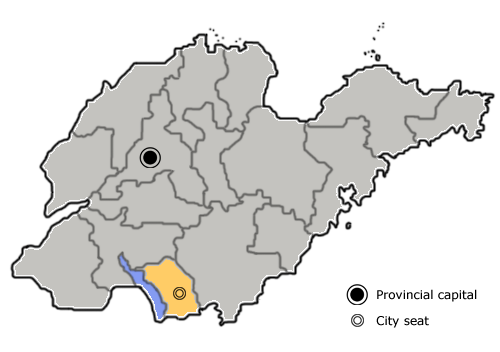
- Location of Zaozhuang in Shandong
- Coordinates (Xuecheng municipal government, Xuecheng District): 34°48′39″N 117°19′26″E
- Country: People's Republic of China
- Province: Shandong
- County-level divisions: 6
- Township-level divisions: 62
- Municipal seat: Xuecheng District

Government
  - Mayor: Zhang Hongwei (张宏伟)

Area
  - Prefecture-level city: 4,563.22 km^{2} (1,761.87 sq mi)
  - Urban: 3,069 km^{2} (1,185 sq mi)
  - Metro: 1,008.9 km^{2} (389.5 sq mi)

Population (2020 census)
  - Prefecture-level city: 3,855,601
  - Density: 844.930/km^{2} (2,188.36/sq mi)
  - Urban: 2,280,953
  - Urban density: 743.2/km^{2} (1,925/sq mi)
  - Metro: 975,539
  - Metro density: 966.93/km^{2} (2,504.3/sq mi)

GDP
  - Prefecture-level city: CN¥ 240 billion US$ 36.3 billion
  - Per capita: CN¥ 61,226; US$ 9,252
- Time zone: UTC+08:00 (China Standard)
- Postal code: 277100
- Area code: 0632
- ISO 3166 code: CN-SD-04
- License Plate Prefix: 鲁D

Zaozhuang
- Traditional Chinese: 棗莊
- Simplified Chinese: 枣庄
- Postal: Tsaochwang
Transcriptions
Standard Mandarin
- Hanyu Pinyin: Zǎozhuāng
- Wade–Giles: Tsao^{3}-chuang^{1}

Zaozhuang (simplified Chinese: 枣庄; traditional Chinese: 棗莊; pinyin: Zǎozhuāng) is a prefecture-level city in the south of Shandong province, People's Republic of China. Since January 2019 (after Laiwu prefecture got incorporated into Jinan prefecture), it has been the smallest prefecture-level city in the province, bordering Jining to the west and north, Linyi to the east, and the province of Jiangsu to the south. The Battle of Taierzhuang occurred in the city during the Second Sino-Japanese War in 1938. The Second Sino-Japanese War (1937–45) had a significant impact on Zaozhuang.

Archaeologists have found evidence of human activities in this region dating back to the Neolithic era. Its culture started from 7300 years ago of ancestor culture, and developed to city-state culture 4300 years ago, then evolved to canal culture 2700 years ago, and finally stepped to industrial culture 130 years ago.

Its population is 3,855,601 at the 2020 census whom 975,539 in the built-up area made of Shizhong and Yicheng districts. As of the end of 2022, the permanent population of Zaozhuang City is 3.8297 million. As of the end of 2023 and the beginning of 2024, the permanent population will be 3.8098 million.

At present, Zaozhuang has gradually grown into one of the important bases of China's lithium battery industry, known as the "Lithium Battery Capital in Northern China".

== History ==
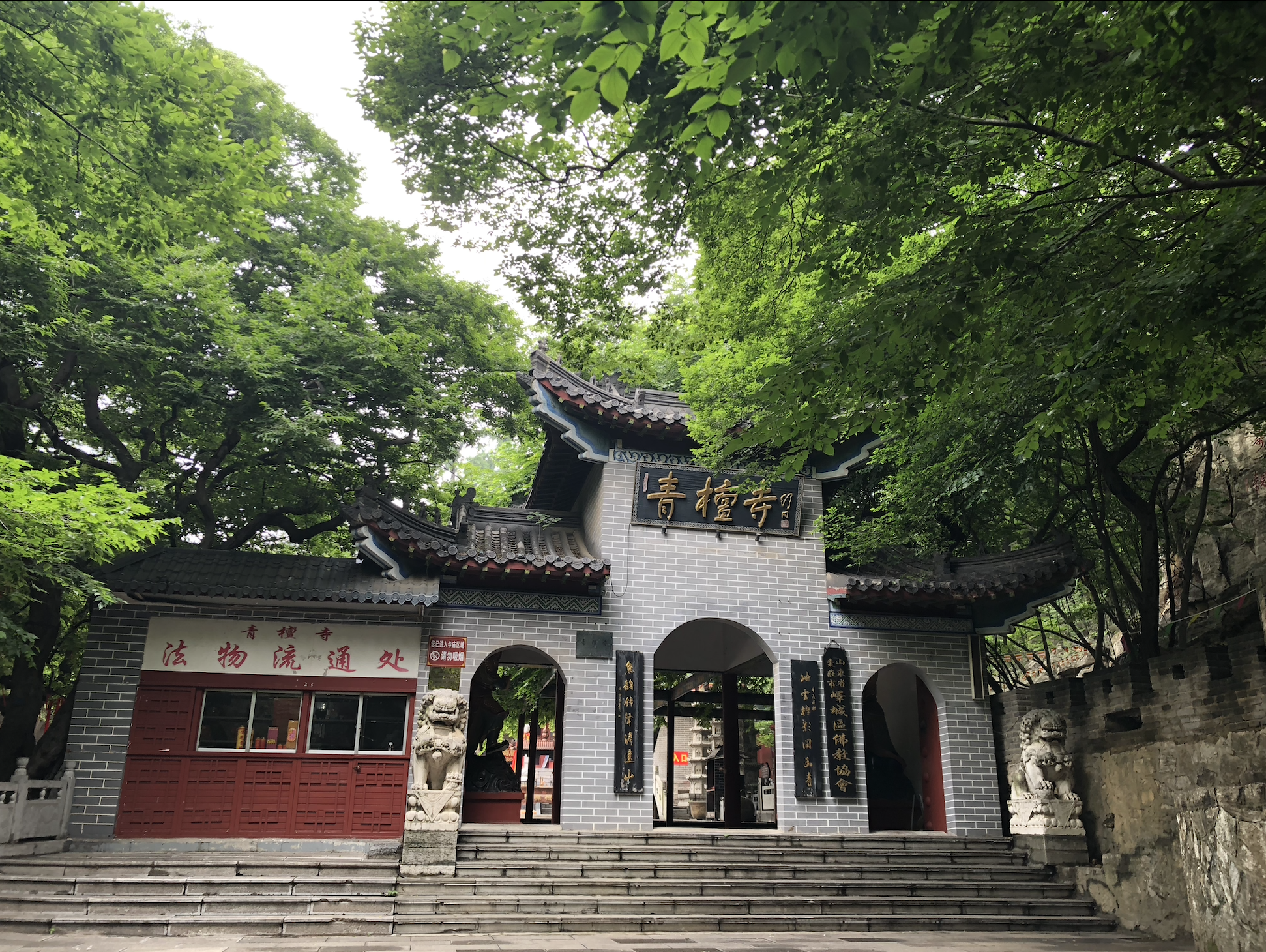
Qingtan Temple, Yicheng, Zaozhuang

During the Xia Dynasty, the south of Zaozhuang was the Kingdom of Zu, and the north and northwest were the Kingdom of Teng and Xue. Later, the name was changed several times. In the Ming Dynasty, Teng County was established in the north and Yizhou was established in the south. Later, Yizhou was reduced to a county.

The history of Zaozhuang is closely linked to the canal. According to archaeological discoveries, the earliest canal in the territory, the Qianyang Canal, was excavated in the Spring and Autumn period. The Zaozhuang section of the Jinghang Canal was excavated in the 32nd year of Ming Wanli (1604), flowing through the city's Taierzhuang, Yucheng, Xuecheng and Tengzhou, with a total length of 93.9 kilometers, from Xiazhen Lijiagang to Zhangzhou. The estuary enters the Yellow River, because the Weihe River is the main supplementary water source. Its opening has changed the situation that the Beijing-Hangzhou Expressway is unreasonable due to the flooding of the Yellow River. For hundreds of years, it has played an important role in the transportation of Nanliangbei, material circulation and cultural exchange. The continuity of the Beijing-Hangzhou Grand Canal also promotes economic prosperity along the canal area. Taierzhuang along the coast has rapidly developed into a "lunan town", and "Yixian County" records: "Taierzhuangtun Canal, merchants are convinced, Tianyibi, and Xuyi is also a city." The gathering of merchants brings cultural blending, Taierzhuang The ancient city has also become a typical representative of the canal culture. It has the most distinctive features of the blending of north and south cultures on the Beijing-Hangzhou Grand Canal and the combination of Chinese and Western cultures.

== Administration ==
The prefecture-level city of Zaozhuang administers six county-level divisions, including five districts and one county-level city. The seat of Zaozhuang is Xuecheng District.

- Shizhong District (市中区)
- Xuecheng District (薛城区)
- Shanting District (山亭区)
- Yicheng District (峄城区)
- Tai'erzhuang District (台儿庄区)
- Tengzhou City (滕州市)

These are further divided into 62 township-level divisions, including 44 towns, two townships and 16 subdistricts.

Map
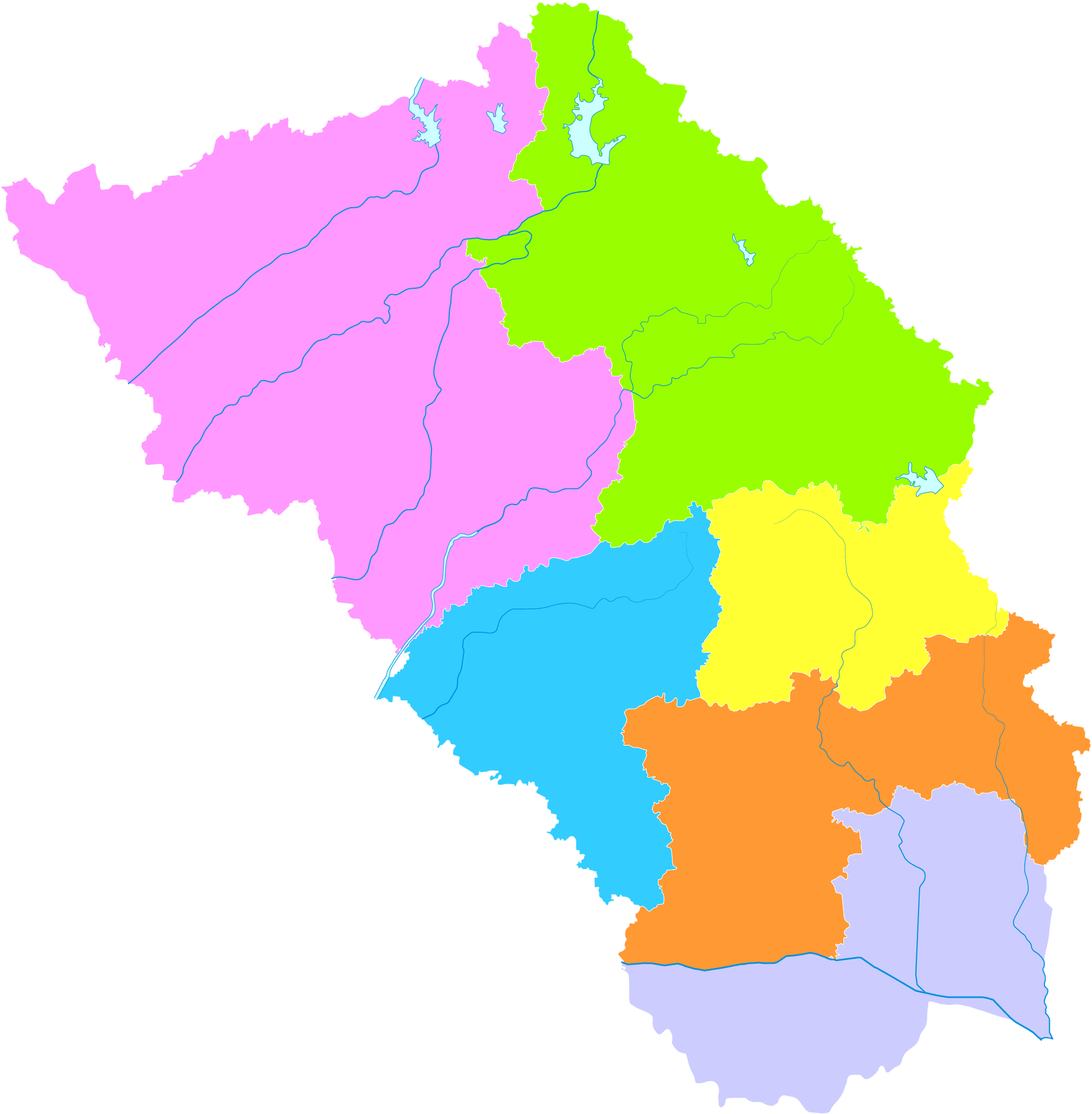

== Coal-Mining History ==
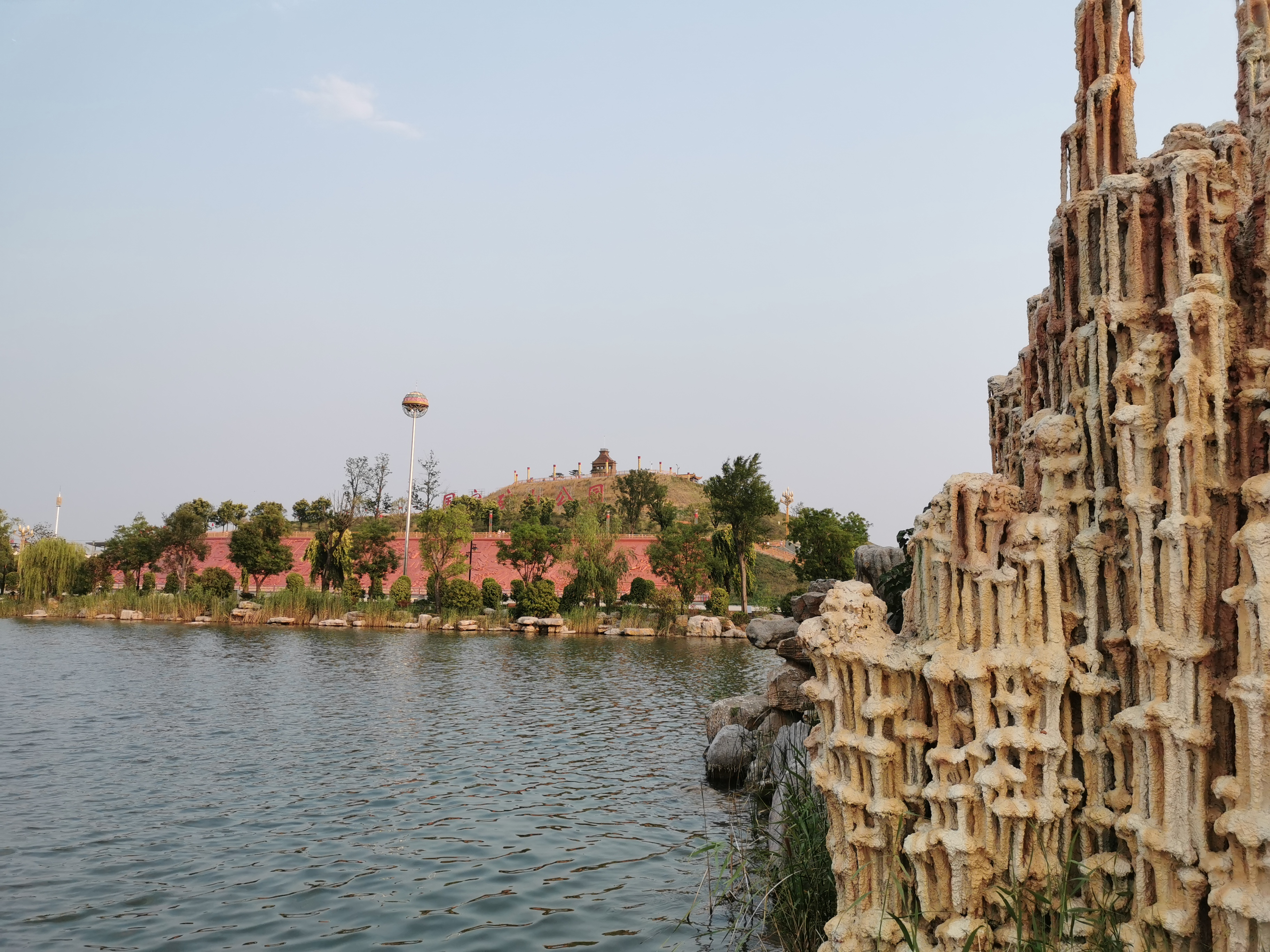
Zhongxing Square in Zaozhuang, which is a quarry lake left after coal ore exhausted

Zaozhuang City plays a significant role in coal mining in China. Coal mining in Zaozhuang dates back to the early Ming dynasty, where villagers dug pits to obtain coal. Although the coal mining industry in Zaozhuang was well-developed prior to World War II, it was severely affected during the Second Sino-Japanese War. In 1954, the coal-mining in Zaozhuang was revived. In the 1980s, 50% of the coal supplied to the Jiangsu-Zhejiang-Shanghai region was sourced from Zaozhuang. After years of economic restructuring and environmental remediation, Zaozhuang is now an eco-friendly city.

== Geography ==
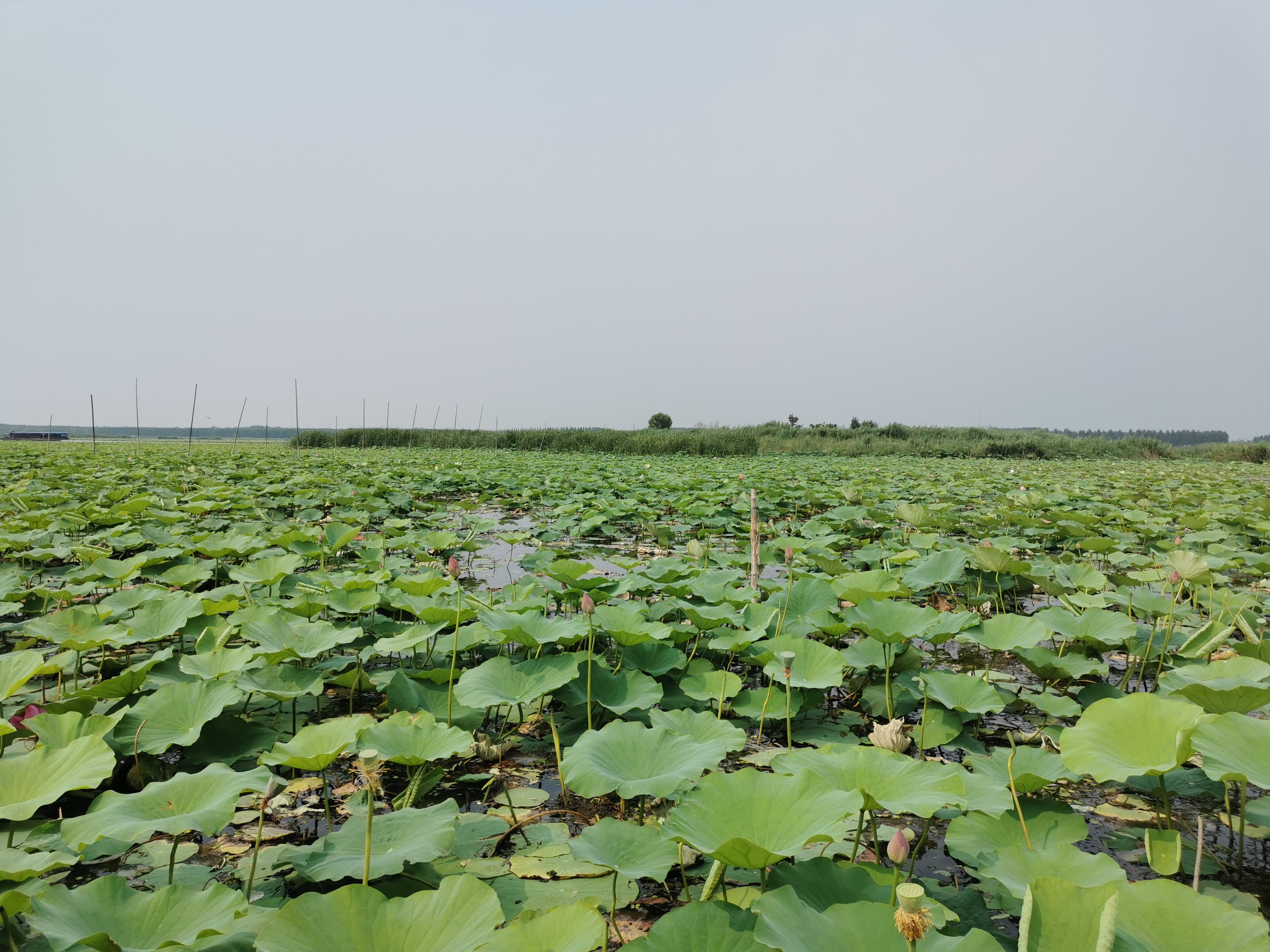
Weishan Lake, which is located at the east of Zaozhuang

Zaozhuang City is located in the southern part of the low hills of Luzhong, and belongs to the Huanghuai Plain. The terrain is high in the north, low in the south, low in the east and low in the west, and it is inclined to the northeast to the southwest. The mountain in the northern Shanting District is 620 meters above sea level, which is the highest point in the city. The mountains, such as the Lianqing Mountain and the Baoji Mountain, are more than 500 meters above sea level, and the mountains are undulating and swaying in the north of the city. Holding 580 meters above sea level, it is called "the first of the seventy-two scorpions." The western lakeside and the coastal zone have the lowest terrain and flat ground, with an altitude of 30–40 meters and a minimum elevation of 24.5 meters. The topography and landforms in the territory are relatively complex, forming many types of landforms such as low mountains, hills, piedmont plains, floodplains, and lakes along the lake. The hills account for 54.6% of the total area, the plains account for 26.6% of the total area, and the depression accounts for 18.8% of the total area.

=== Climate ===
Zaozhuang belongs to the mid latitude warm temperate monsoon continental climate zone, which combines the characteristics of a warm and humid climate in the south and a dry and cold climate in the north. Zaozhuang with four distinct seasons, summers are long and hot and humid and winters are cold and dry, spring and autumn are short and cool and mostly dry, but air humidly is high. The annual average sunshine hours in various parts of the city are generally between 2512.0 and 2768.4 hours, and the daily average throughout the year is between 6.9 and 7.6 hours.

Climate data for Zaozhuang (Shizhong District), elevation 78 m (256 ft), (1991–2020 normals, extremes 1981–present)
Month	Jan	Feb	Mar	Apr	May	Jun	Jul	Aug	Sep	Oct	Nov	Dec	Year
Record high °C (°F)	17.3 (63.1)	23.6 (74.5)	32.1 (89.8)	34.0 (93.2)	37.8 (100.0)	39.1 (102.4)	40.9 (105.6)	36.7 (98.1)	35.5 (95.9)	34.8 (94.6)	25.9 (78.6)	20.1 (68.2)	40.9 (105.6)
Mean daily maximum °C (°F)	5.4 (41.7)	8.7 (47.7)	14.5 (58.1)	21.3 (70.3)	26.7 (80.1)	30.8 (87.4)	31.6 (88.9)	30.7 (87.3)	27.3 (81.1)	21.8 (71.2)	14.1 (57.4)	7.3 (45.1)	20.0 (68.0)
Daily mean °C (°F)	0.5 (32.9)	3.4 (38.1)	8.9 (48.0)	15.5 (59.9)	21.1 (70.0)	25.3 (77.5)	27.2 (81.0)	26.4 (79.5)	22.3 (72.1)	16.3 (61.3)	8.8 (47.8)	2.3 (36.1)	14.8 (58.7)
Mean daily minimum °C (°F)	−3.3 (26.1)	−0.8 (30.6)	3.9 (39.0)	10.1 (50.2)	15.8 (60.4)	20.5 (68.9)	23.6 (74.5)	22.9 (73.2)	18.1 (64.6)	11.7 (53.1)	4.7 (40.5)	−1.5 (29.3)	10.5 (50.9)
Record low °C (°F)	−13.0 (8.6)	−14.4 (6.1)	−8.7 (16.3)	−2.1 (28.2)	4.5 (40.1)	12.5 (54.5)	16.2 (61.2)	12.1 (53.8)	8.4 (47.1)	−1.1 (30.0)	−7.2 (19.0)	−12.7 (9.1)	−14.4 (6.1)
Average precipitation mm (inches)	12.5 (0.49)	16.5 (0.65)	21.4 (0.84)	44.5 (1.75)	69.8 (2.75)	100.4 (3.95)	245.8 (9.68)	206.1 (8.11)	63.4 (2.50)	33.5 (1.32)	31.9 (1.26)	14.9 (0.59)	860.7 (33.89)
Average precipitation days (≥ 0.1 mm)	3.6	4.3	4.9	6.1	7.3	7.5	13.6	11.7	7.5	5.3	5.1	4.1	81
Average snowy days	3.2	2.9	0.9	0.1	0	0	0	0	0	0	0.7	1.6	9.4
Average relative humidity (%)	62	59	56	58	62	65	79	79	71	66	67	64	66
Mean monthly sunshine hours	135.8	141.9	186.8	203.2	211.8	176.7	152.9	155.9	164.1	169.1	142.0	139.3	1,979.5
Percentage possible sunshine	43	46	50	52	49	41	35	38	45	49	46	46	45
Source: China Meteorological Administration all-time January high

== Transportation ==
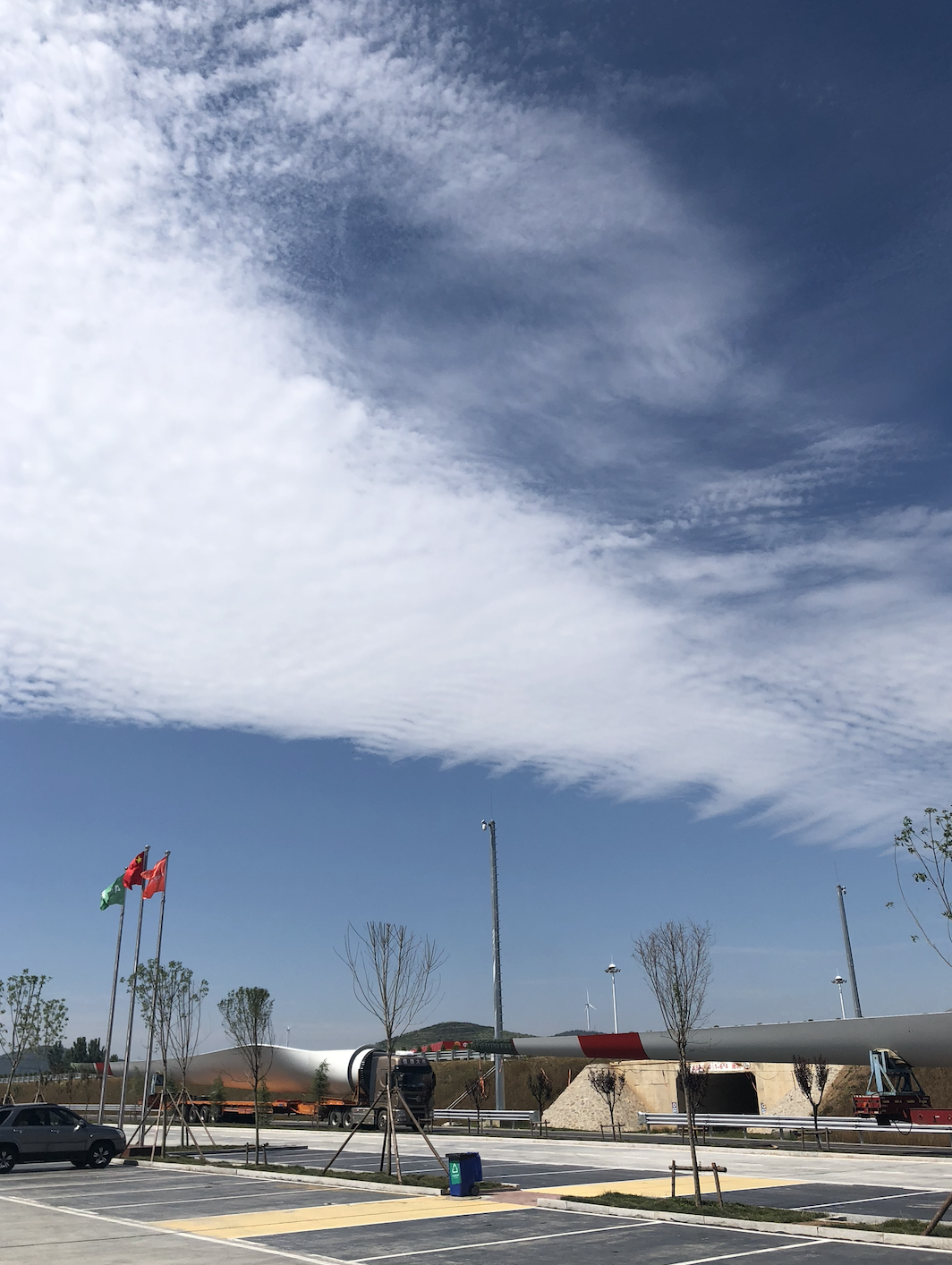
Xintai Expressway in Shanting, Zaozhuang

Zaozhuang and Zaozhuang West are stops on both the Beijing-Shanghai high-speed railway and the Beijing-Shanghai (Jinghu) railway. Since 15 May 2016, the Zaolin railway (from Zaozhuang West to Linyi) has connected the city with the Yanri railway. Based on Shandong Province's planning, Zaozhuang will be linked with Linyi (to east), Heze (to west) and Jinan (to north) by the inter-city rail by 2022.

The Beijing-Fuzhou highway also passes through Zaozhuang from north to south.

Zaozhuang has already augmented whole city's transportation by bus rapid transportation (BRT). Zaozhuang City has officially become a "National Demonstration City for Bus City Construction". As of 2021, Zaozhuang Bus Rapid Transit has 10 BRT lines and 16 transfer lines and has safely operated 98 million kilometers and transported a total of 390 million passengers.

The construction project of Zaozhuang Yiyun Airport has been launched, which is one of the key projects in China's 13th Five Year Plan (2016–2020). Positioned as a domestic 4C level branch airport. Zaozhuang Yiyun Airport is about 180 kilometers away from Jinan Airport and 60 kilometers away from Xuzhou Guanyin International Airport. Xuzhou Guanyin International Airport has opened the urban terminal building in Zaozhuang.

== Culture ==
=== Cuisine ===
Zaozhuang Spicy chicken (辣子鸡)

Zaozhuang Spicy Chicken has been approved as an expansion project of the provincial intangible cultural heritage representative project list in Shandong Province. Traditional Zaozhuang spicy chicken is cooked in a folk pot, using chopped firewood as fuel, and stir-fried to obtain a delicious taste.

Vegetable pancakes (菜煎饼) Vegetable pancakes are one of the three famous dishes in Zaozhuang City (Spicy chicken, Vegetable pancakes, and Mutton soup). The raw materials are prepared in proportion with more than ten types of miscellaneous grains, ground into flour, and then spread and baked. Spread cooking oil, eggs, ham sausages, and various seasonal vegetables on the baked pancakes, heat them until they are ripe, and then cut them into pieces for consumption.

Sa Soup (糁汤)

Sa soup is a must for breakfast in Zaozhuang, served with deep-fried dough sticks, Shaobing (Baked cake in griddle), etc. Sa soup is often made from chicken (or beef or lamb) and wheat kernels, flour, scallions, ginger, salt, pepper, five spice powder, sesame oil, soy sauce, vinegar, and other raw materials through multiple processes.

Mutton soup (羊肉汤)

One of the three famous dishes in Zaozhuang City, including spicy chicken, vegetable pancakes, and lamb soup, is made by boiling lamb bones and adding fresh lamb and lamb offal into a soup pot. After boiling, the lamb soup is poured in and sprinkled with scallions to make the "No.1 Soup in Shandong" - Zaozhuang Lamb Soup.

=== Dialect ===
Zaozhuang dialect belongs to the Northern language family, and a more detailed classification belongs to the Xilu community in the Central Plains Mandarin region. Zaozhuang dialect is not unique in the vast northern dialect area, with similarities and differences.

Zaozhuang dialect can be roughly divided into two schools: new and old. These two dialects are basically consistent in grammar, with slight differences in vocabulary but significant differences in pronunciation. The new dialect is formed by the influence of Mandarin pronunciation on the old Zaozhuang dialect.

== Education ==
- Zaozhuang University is a public full-time undergraduate university in Shandong Province. The school currently has two campuses, Shizhong and Xuecheng. The Shizhong campus covers an area of 1,027 acres.

== Notable people ==
- Lu Ban (c. 507–444 BC), Chinese carpenter, engineer, revered as the Chinese god of builders and contractors.
- Micius (ca. 480 BC – 390 BC), Warring States era philosopher and thinker
- Lord Mengchang (died 279 BC), one of the famed Four Lords of the Warring States period.
- Xi Zhong, China's fabled first wheelmaker, featured in Wumen Huikai's The Gateless Barrier (8th verse), whose wheel is earlier alluded to in the Tao Te Ching (11th verse) and other works. The Xi Zhong Culture Park is in Zaozhuang.

== See also ==
- Chinese frigate Zaozhuang
