= Shandong Vocational College of Industry =

Shandong Vocational College of Industry (山东工业职业学院)
- Motto: 笃实求真 明理出新
- Type: Public
- Established: July,1959
- Affiliations: Shandong Provincial People's Government
- President: Ma Guangting (马光亭)
- Faculty: 509
- Undergraduates: Over 10,000
- Location: Zibo, China
- Campus: Urban
- Colors: College Red; School Blue
- Website: www.sdivc.edu.cn

Shandong Vocational College of Industry (simplified Chinese: 山东工业职业学院; traditional Chinese: 山東工業職業學院; pinyin: Shāndōng Gōngyè Zhíyè Xuéyuàn) is a public full-time institution of higher learning located in Zibo City, Shandong Province, China, which belongs to Shandong Iron and Steel Group.

== Timeline ==
In 1959, Zhangdian Nonferrous Metal Industry School (张店有色金属工业学校), which is the predecessor of the school, was built.

Later it was renamed as Shandong Non-ferrous Metal School (山东省有色金属学校), Shandong Metallurgical Industrial School (山东省冶金工业学校) and Shandong Industrial School (山东省工业学校).

In 2002, Shandong Metallurgical Workers University (山东冶金职工大学) moved into Zibo from Jinan.

In May 2003, Shandong Vocational College of Industry was established on the basis of Shandong Industrial School and Shandong Metallurgical Workers University.

== Departments set up ==
(Information from School Webpages)

Department	Webpage
Institute of metallurgy	冶金学院官方网站
Department of mechanical and electrical engineering	机电工程系官方网站
Department of electrical engineering	电气工程系官方网站
Department of architecture and information engineering	建筑与信息工程系官方网站
Department of business administration	工商管理系官方网站

== Sister Schools ==
- Singapore:Nanyang Technological University
- China:Shandong University of Technology
