= Tangfang =

Tángfāng may refer to the following locations in China:

- Tangfang, Hebei (唐坊镇)
- Tangfang, Heilongjiang (糖坊镇), town in Bin County
- Tangfang, Shandong (唐坊镇), town in Gaoqing County
- Tangfang Township, Jiangxi (塘坊乡), in Guangchang County
- Tangfang Township, Shaanxi (汤坊乡), in Xingping
