= Zhangdian, Zibo =

Coordinates: 36°48′22″N 118°01′05″E

Zhangdian District 张店区
- District
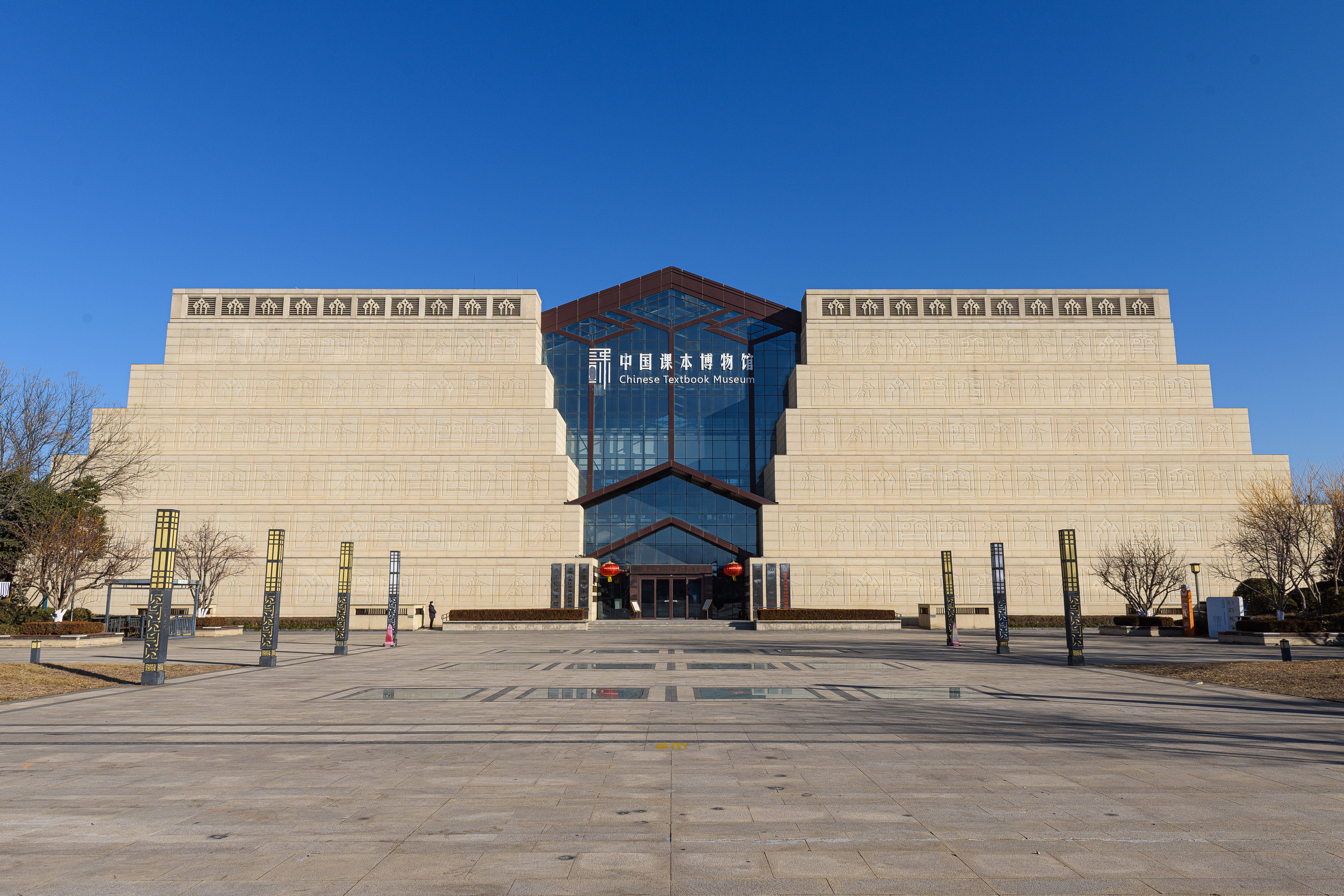
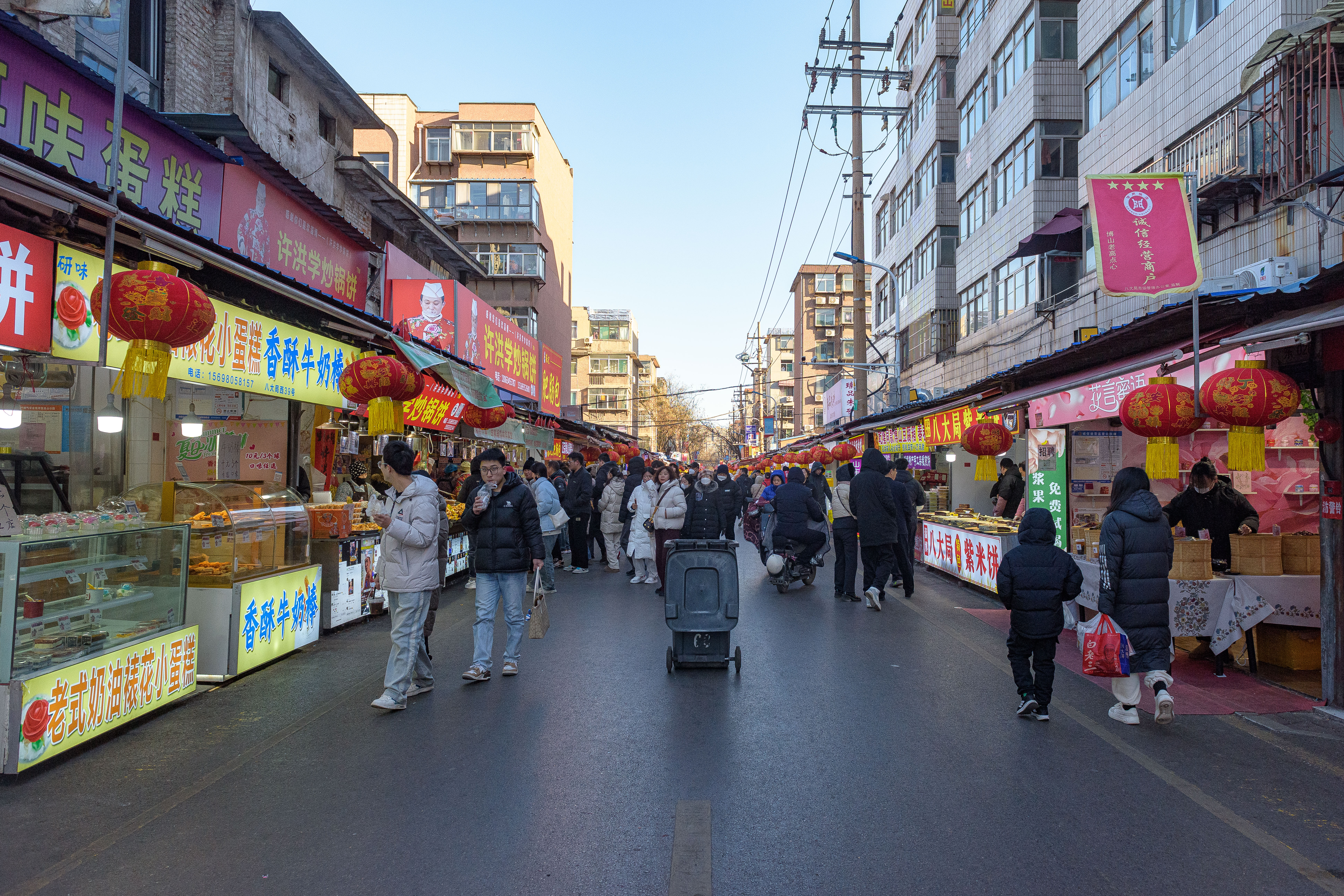
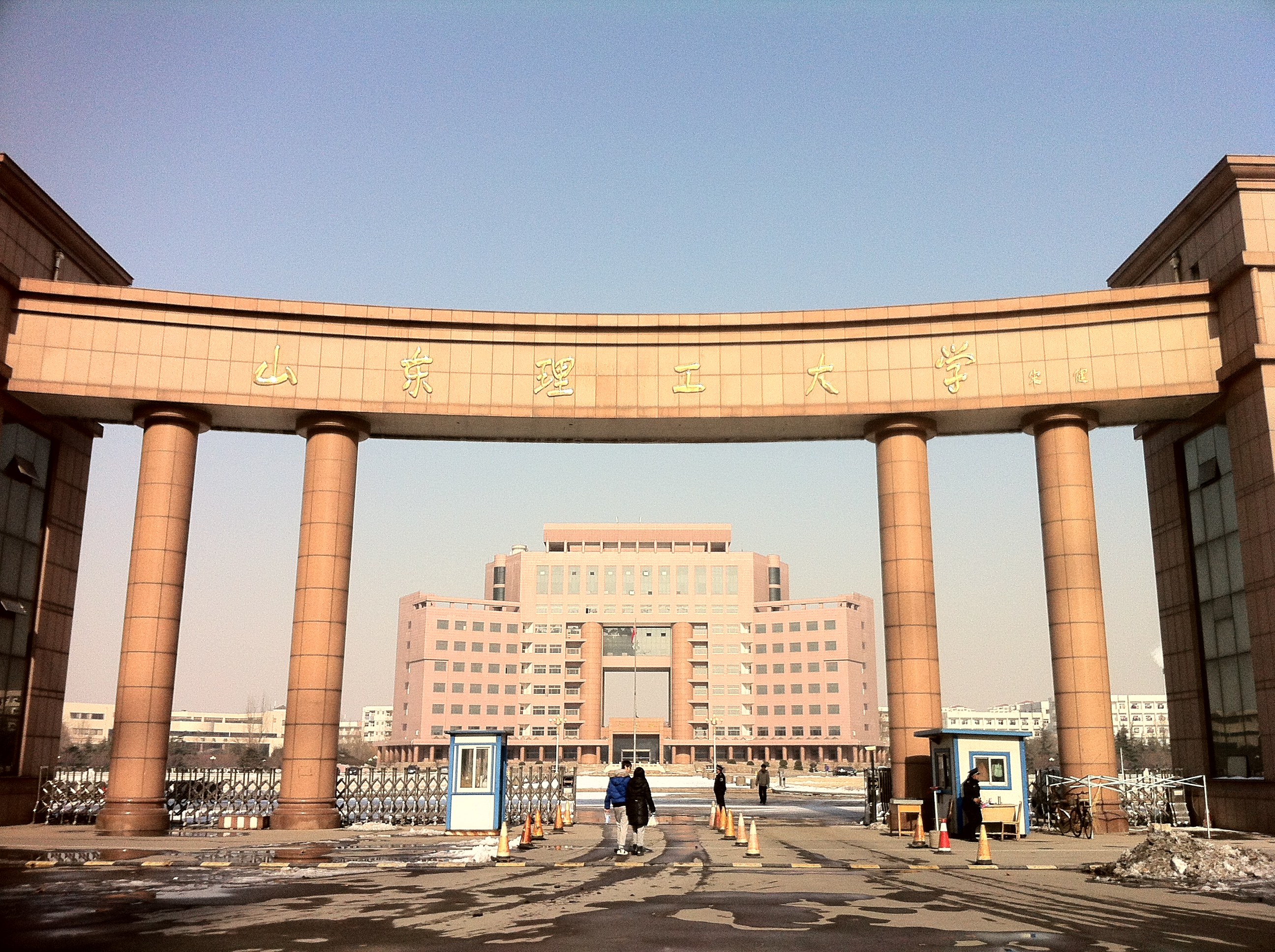
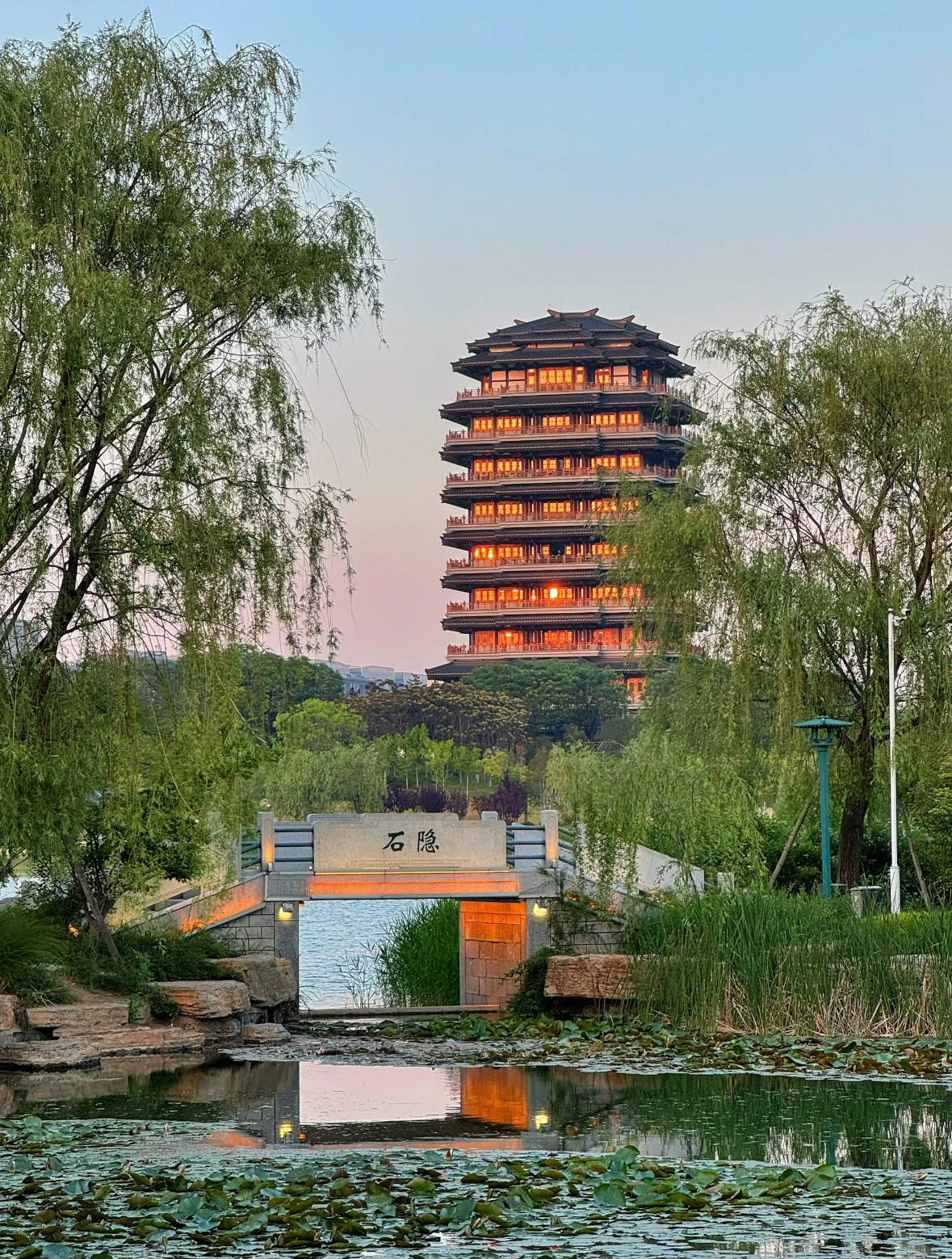
- Textbook Museum of China Badaju Market Shandong University of Technology Haidai Pagoda

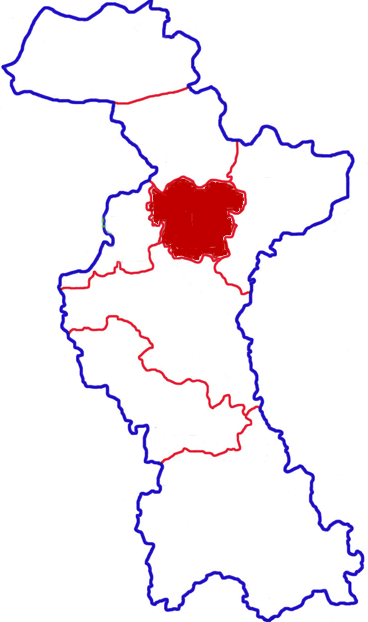
- Location in Zibo

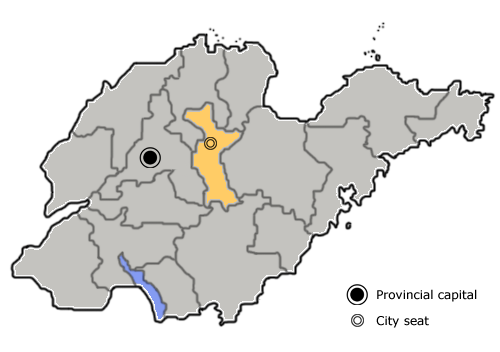
- Zibo in Shandong
- Country: People's Republic of China
- Province: Shandong
- Prefecture-level city: Zibo

Area
  - Total: 244 km^{2} (94 sq mi)

Population (2020 census)
  - Total: 1,272,967
  - Density: 5,220/km^{2} (13,500/sq mi)
- Time zone: UTC+8 (China Standard)
- Postal code: 255022
- Area code: +86 0533
- Website: www.zhangdian.gov.cn

Zhangdian (simplified Chinese: 张店; traditional Chinese: 張店; pinyin: Zhāngdiàn) is the central urban district of Zibo city in Shandong province, China. It covers an area of 244 square kilometres (94 sq mi), including a built-up area of 71 square kilometres (27 sq mi). It governs six towns, six subdistricts, 113 administrative villages, and 90 neighborhood committees. It has a registered population of 1,272,967, including an urban population of 1,205,102.

It contains the administrative offices of Zibo central government, and has major rail and bus stations. The outer area is highly industrialized. The central area is a mixture of high rise office buildings, condos, government offices and shopping malls. The Central Business District is located around People's Park.

== History ==
=== Changguo county ===
The earliest civilization flourished in Zhangdian area four to five thousand years ago, which were categorized as Longshan and Dawenkou culture. In Shang dynasty, it was the fief of Duke of Pang (逄伯), after King Wu of Zhou defeated Shang, he enfeoff Jiang Ziya to this region, and then it was inherited by State of Qi, whose rulers were descents of Jiang Ziya. In 284 BC, Yue Yi, a general of Yan led the army to attack State of Qi and took control of Zhangdian. He then built the city of Changguo (昌國) in this area. After Qin unified China, a county called Changguo was established here, under the Qi Commandery. In 556, Changguo County was abolished and replaced with Pangshan County (逄山縣).

=== Flourished as a trading town ===
At the end of Jin Dynasty and the beginning of Yuan dynasty, Zhangdian became famous as a trading center. It had always been administered under Jinan Prefecture, and was a city of significance for Yuan, Ming and Qing dynasty.

=== Industrialization ===
Large coal deposits in the Zibo region, particularly around Zhangdian, Zhoucun, and Boshan, began to be exploited on a significant scale in the late nineteenth and early twentieth centuries. The emergence of coal mining created one of the earliest industrial concentrations in central Shandong.

Coal extraction brought an influx of miners, merchants, and laborers, stimulating the growth of surrounding support industries such as machinery repair, transport services, and general commerce. The availability of abundant fuel also supported the expansion of local industries, including ceramics, glassmaking, metallurgy, and mechanical manufacturing, especially in neighboring Boshan. Coal thus provided the material foundation for Zhangdian’s transformation into an industrial center.

The opening of the Jiaoji Railway (Jinan-Qingdao) between 1897 and 1904 fundamentally reshaped Zhangdian’s economic position; Jiaoji Railway also operated a branch line Zhang-Bo Railway (張博鐵路) from Boshan to Zhangdian. With its position, Zhangdian quickly developed into a key distribution node for coal and industrial goods.

=== PRC era ===
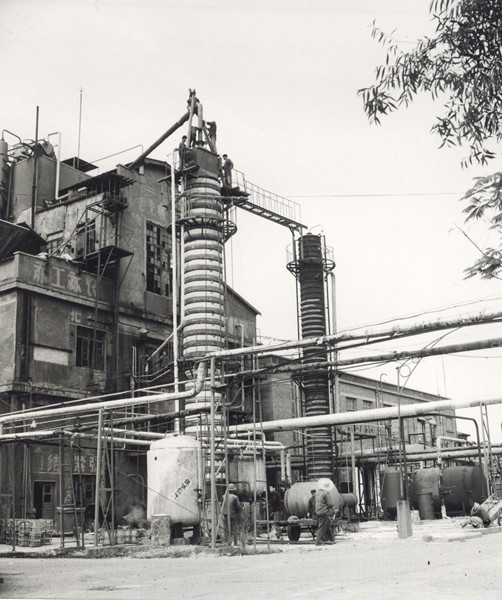
In 1954, Xinhua Pharmaceutical in Zhangdian built and put into operation its first modern chemical synthesis raw material phenacetin workshop in China

On March 1, 1947, during the Second Chinese Civil War, Zhangdian was taken by the People's Liberation Army, and the Zhangdian City government was established, under the jurisdiction of the Bohai Administrative Office. In July 1949, the Central-South Shandong Zibo Special Region merged with the Mining Department of the East China Finance and Economics Office, and they formed the Zibo Industrial and Mining Special Region (淄博工礦特區), by which Zhangdian City became the administrative center of this new region.

In April 1955, Zhangdian was officially established as one of the districts of Zibo city.

== Administrative divisions ==
Zhangdian governs six towns, including Nanding, Fujia, Mashang, Fangzhen, Zhongbu and Fengshui.

It also governs six subdistricts, including Chezhan Subdistrict, Heping Subdistrict, Gongyuan Subdistrict, Keyuan Subdistrict, Tiyuchang Subdistrict and Xingyuan subdistrict.

== Natural Environment ==
=== Landform ===
Zhangdian is on the north east side of the synclinal basin of Zibo. It is located on a transition area from low mountains and hills to Huangfan plain, with its eastern and southern parts higher than its western and northern part. The land is generally plain in Zhangdian, with its plain covering 72.43% of its gross area.

There is a northeast-trending massif in the northeast part of Zhangdian, with Heitie Mountain as its main peak. Heitie Mountain is 254 meters high. It is also the highest mountain in Zhangdian.

=== Soil ===
There are two kinds of soil in Zhangdian, cinnamon soil and Shajiang black soil.

=== River ===
Xiaofu River, Zhulong River, Laozi River and Mansi River are the main rivers in Zhangdian. Their length inside Zhangdian district are respectively 17 kilometers, 21.8 kilometers, 30.6 kilometers and 6.8 kilometers. They are all north-trending except Zhulong River.

=== Climate ===
Zhangdian has a temperate and monsoonal climate, with four clearly distinct seasons.

== Tourist Attraction ==
=== Ceramics City ===
Ceramics City is located on Zhangdian centre cultural square. It exhibits fancy porcelains from the Neolithic Age until now which were produced and discovered in Zibo. The museum hall is divided in seven parts: integrated exhibition area, ancient exhibition area, neoteric exhibition area...

=== Yudaihu scenic area ===
Yudaihu scenic area is an integrated scenic area with the recreation tourism, agricultural ecology and food service.
