= Beijiao =

Beijiao may refer to:

- Beijiao, Foshan (北滘镇), town in Shunde District, Foshan, Guangdong, China
- Beijiao, Zibo (北郊镇), town in Zhoucun District, Zibo, Shandong, China
- Beijiao (island) (北礁), one of the Paracel Islands in the South China Sea
