= People's Park (Zibo) =

Urban public park in Zibo, Shandong, China

- Renmin Park
- Interactive map of People's Park
- Type: Urban park
- Location: Zibo, Shandong, China
- Coordinates: 36°48′31″N 118°2′56″E
- Area: 260,000 m^{2} (2,800,000 sq ft)
- Created: 1960

People's Park (Chinese: 人民公园; pinyin: Rénmín Gōngyuán) is an urban public park in Zibo city, Shandong province, China. It is located in central Zhangdian District of Zibo.

Created in 1960, the park was thoroughly renovated from 2002 to 2003. The renovation project started in October 2002, took eight months and cost 40 million yuan, and the park was reopened on 1 July 2003. Its environment was made more natural, facilities upgraded, and the enclosing walls were demolished. In 2003, the People's Park renovation project won the China Habitat and Environment Award, the highest environmental prize in China.

People's Park covers an area of 260,000 square metres (2,800,000 sq ft), including 38,000 square metres (410,000 sq ft) of lake. There are 148 species of trees in the park. Three public plazas have been built in the east, south, and north sides of the park.
