= Shandong Zibo Experimental High School =

- 山东淄博实验中学

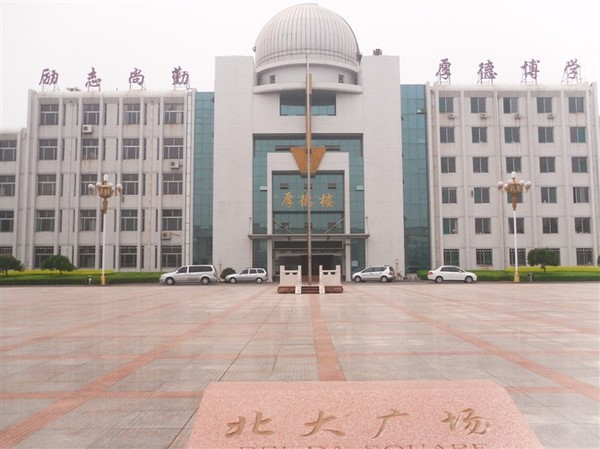
- Shandong Province; Zibo, Shandong Province; China

Information
- School type: Experimental High School
- Motto: 励志、尚勤、厚德、博学
- Established: 1942

Shandong Zibo Experimental High School (Chinese: 山东淄博实验中学; pinyin: Shāndōng Zībó Shíyàn Zhōngxúe) located in Zibo, Shandong, China, is a key school in Shandong Province, China. It was originally named YaoNan Middle School, which was established in 1942 and named after the anti-Japanese martyr Ma Yaonan. In 1955, it was renamed to Zibo No. 5 Middle School. In 1997 September, the high school department of Zibo No. 5 Middle School moved to the present location, which is in the west area of Zhandian District.

The school has international class, where students are educated by the curriculum of the US standard public high school. Alumni from international class are enrolled in various renowned universities in the North America and other countries.

The school was deemed one of Shandong's first key schools.

== Title ==
The calligraphic title Shandong Zibo Shiyan Zhongxue (山东淄博实验中学, literally Shandong Zibo Experimental High School) was inscribed by Ouyang Zhongshi, a Chinese calligrapher.

== Campus ==
Shandong Zibo Experimental High School occupies an area of more than 22 hectares, with a total building area of 100,000 square meters. The school has a stadium which can hold more than 2,000 people.

The Confucius Park is located to the south of Boxue Building, and covers an area of 6,280 square meters. In the park stands a statue of Confucius.
