= Huantai County =

Huantai County 桓台县
- County
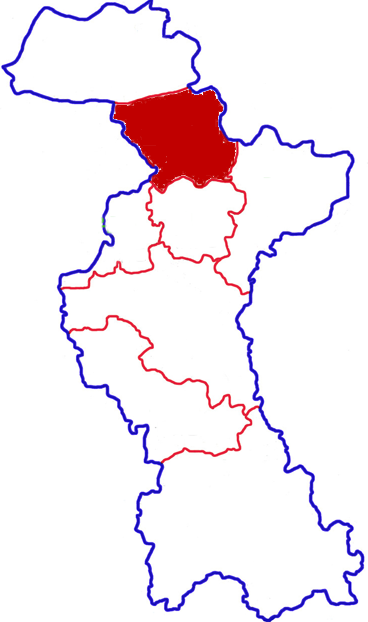
- Location in Zibo

- Location of the seat in Shandong
- Coordinates: 36°58′N 118°06′E
- Country: People's Republic of China
- Province: Shandong
- Prefecture-level city: Zibo

Area
  - Total: 498.25 km^{2} (192.38 sq mi)
- Elevation: 17 m (56 ft)
- Time zone: UTC+8 (China Standard)
- Postal code: 255000
- Area code: +86 0533

Huantai County (simplified Chinese: 桓台县; traditional Chinese: 桓台縣; pinyin: Huántái Xiàn) is a county of Zibo City in north-central Shandong province, People's Republic of China. It is located 17 kilometres (11 mi) north of downtown Zibo.

The population in 1999 was 482,683.

== Administrative divisions ==
As of 2012, this county is divided to 11 towns.

Towns

- Suo (索镇)
- Qifeng (起凤镇)
- Xingjia (邢家镇)
- Tianzhuang (田庄镇)
- Jingjia (荆家镇)
- Maqiao (马桥镇)
- Chenzhuang (陈庄镇)
- Xincheng (新城镇)
- Zhoujia (周家镇)
- Tangshan (唐山镇)
- Guoli (果里镇)

== Climate ==
Climate data for Huantai, elevation 18 m (59 ft), (1991–2020 normals, extremes 1981–present)
Month	Jan	Feb	Mar	Apr	May	Jun	Jul	Aug	Sep	Oct	Nov	Dec	Year
Record high °C (°F)	20.1 (68.2)	22.0 (71.6)	32.2 (90.0)	33.5 (92.3)	37.6 (99.7)	41.5 (106.7)	40.5 (104.9)	38.1 (100.6)	39.7 (103.5)	32.0 (89.6)	26.7 (80.1)	19.8 (67.6)	41.5 (106.7)
Mean daily maximum °C (°F)	3.9 (39.0)	7.9 (46.2)	15.0 (59.0)	21.5 (70.7)	27.5 (81.5)	32.0 (89.6)	32.4 (90.3)	31.0 (87.8)	27.6 (81.7)	21.4 (70.5)	12.9 (55.2)	5.6 (42.1)	19.9 (67.8)
Daily mean °C (°F)	−1.2 (29.8)	2.2 (36.0)	8.9 (48.0)	15.3 (59.5)	21.6 (70.9)	26.2 (79.2)	27.7 (81.9)	26.4 (79.5)	22.2 (72.0)	15.7 (60.3)	7.7 (45.9)	0.7 (33.3)	14.4 (58.0)
Mean daily minimum °C (°F)	−5.2 (22.6)	−2.3 (27.9)	3.6 (38.5)	9.7 (49.5)	16.0 (60.8)	20.9 (69.6)	23.5 (74.3)	22.5 (72.5)	17.6 (63.7)	11.0 (51.8)	3.3 (37.9)	−3.2 (26.2)	9.8 (49.6)
Record low °C (°F)	−19.5 (−3.1)	−17.9 (−0.2)	−11.3 (11.7)	−5.8 (21.6)	0.6 (33.1)	9.7 (49.5)	15.9 (60.6)	11.3 (52.3)	5.5 (41.9)	−2.6 (27.3)	−12.6 (9.3)	−21.8 (−7.2)	−21.8 (−7.2)
Average precipitation mm (inches)	6.9 (0.27)	11.5 (0.45)	10.2 (0.40)	27.2 (1.07)	61.0 (2.40)	77.4 (3.05)	143.3 (5.64)	160.2 (6.31)	44.4 (1.75)	23.9 (0.94)	23.4 (0.92)	7.7 (0.30)	597.1 (23.5)
Average precipitation days (≥ 0.1 mm)	2.7	3.5	3.2	5.3	6.7	8.0	12.0	11.0	7.1	5.6	4.5	3.3	72.9
Average snowy days	3.3	3.1	1.3	0.1	0	0	0	0	0	0	0.6	2.0	10.4
Average relative humidity (%)	57	54	47	51	55	57	71	75	67	61	61	60	60
Mean monthly sunshine hours	152.2	161.9	218.8	237.5	269.4	231.9	201.8	201.8	185.5	185.7	159.1	145.6	2,351.2
Percentage possible sunshine	49	53	59	60	61	53	46	49	50	54	53	49	53
Source: China Meteorological Administrationall-time August record
