= Zichuan, Zibo =

Zichuan District 淄川区
- District
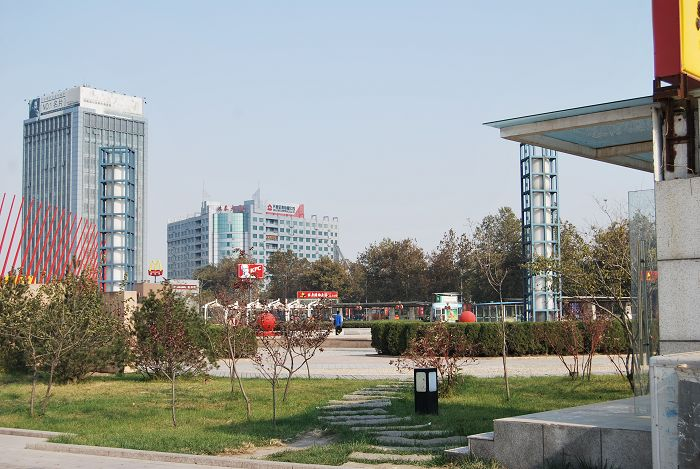
- Liuquan Square in downtown Zichuan

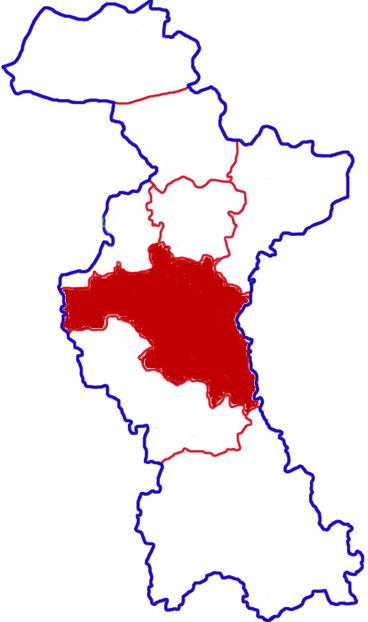
- Location in Zibo

- Location in Shandong
- Coordinates: 36°38′37″N 117°58′01″E
- Country: People's Republic of China
- Province: Shandong
- Prefecture-level city: Zibo

Area
  - Total: 960 km^{2} (370 sq mi)

Population (2017)
  - Total: 640,700
  - Density: 670/km^{2} (1,700/sq mi)
- Time zone: UTC+8 (China Standard)
- Postal code: 255100
- Area code: +86 0533
- Website: www.zichuan.gov.cn

The Zichuan District (Chinese: 淄川区; pinyin: Zīchuān Qū) is one of eight divisions within the city of Zibo in the Chinese province of Shandong. As the largest district of Zibo, it is composed of an urban area of over 23 square kilometers, and 17 towns that administer vast rural areas, almost 1,000 square kilometers in total. Zichuan is an important industrial center of Shandong.

Although administratively not a city, downtown Zichuan is known to locals as the "Zichuan City". The urban area has an estimated population of 20,000 while the total population of Zichuan District is over 670,000 in 2013. Southern Zichuan extends into the Shandong Hills, while the northern part of the district, located on plains, is more densely populated. Zichuan is the hometown of Chinese writer Pu Songling, who wrote his most famous work Liaozhai Zhiyi here.

== History ==
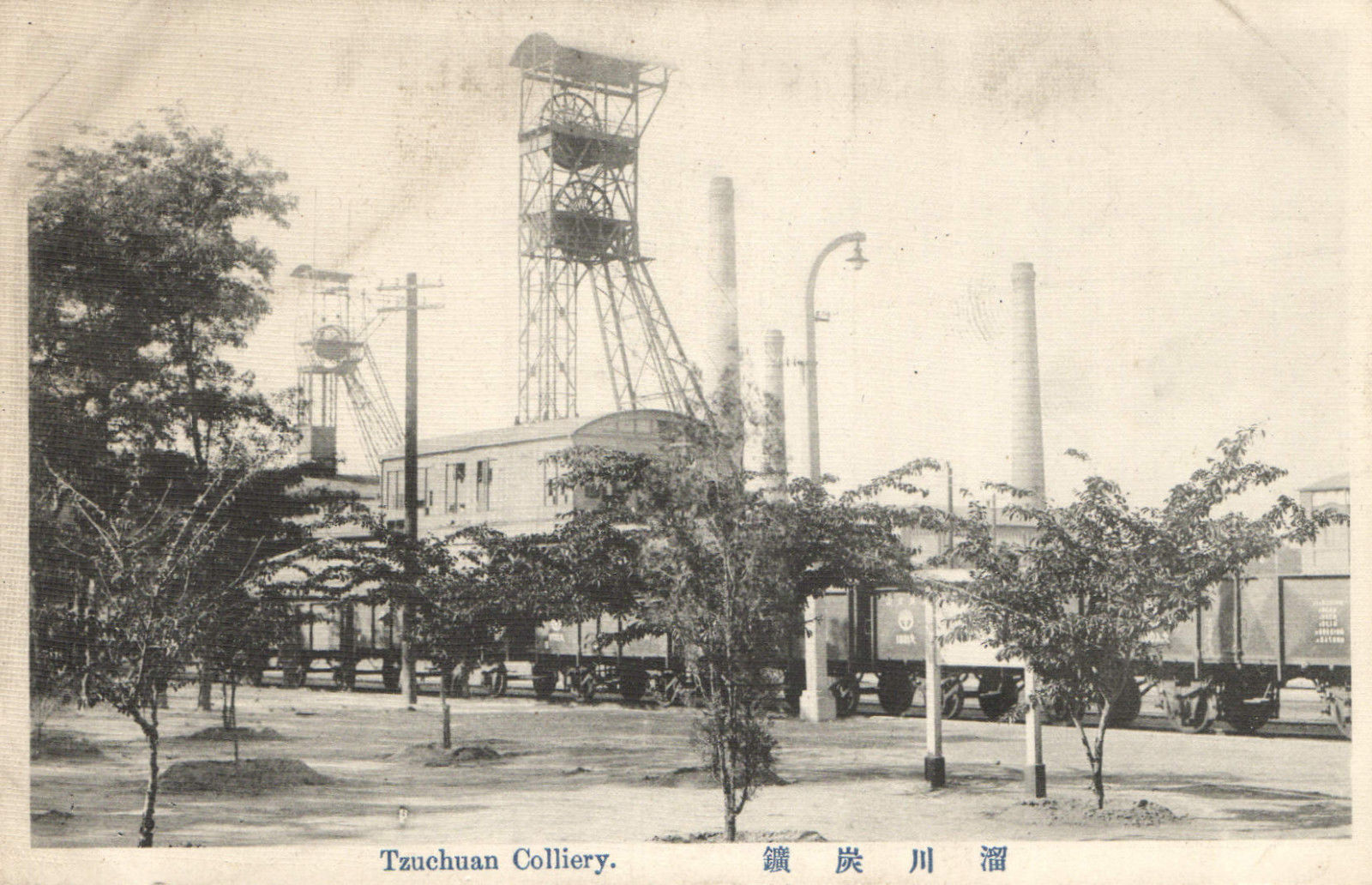
Zichuan coal mine in the 1940s

During the first years of West Han dynasty, Zichuan was set up with its Panyang as its first name as a county. Panyang means south of River Pan. Zichuan City was once a stone-walled city with four big gates in the Ming dynasty and extended to its present scale mainly in the recent decades. Zichuan is also a name connected to river. Zi is a might river miles away to the west, and Chuan is river in Chinese.
After thousands of years slow development relying on agriculture, Zichuan had undergone an economic breakthrough since the discovery of its coal resource. The years when China was under colonial invasion a century ago the 1800s, it was the German who start dig coals first. Following the foundation of new China, or the People's Republic of China, in 1956, Zichuan was set up as a district and is one of the few two districts of Zibo within the next limited years.

== Administrative divisions ==
As of 2012, this county is divided to 4 subdistricts, 15 towns and 2 townships.

Subdistricts

- Banyanglu Subdistrict (般阳路街道)
- Songlinglu Subdistrict (松龄路街道)
- Shangchenglu Subdistrict (商城路街道)
- Zhonglou Subdistrict (钟楼街道)

Towns

- Chengnan (城南镇)
- Kunlun (昆仑镇)
- Cicun (磁村镇)
- Lingzi (岭子镇)
- Shangjia (商家镇)
- Heiwang (黑旺镇)
- Zihe (淄河镇)
- Dongping (东坪镇)
- Xihe (西河镇)
- Longquan (龙泉镇)
- Zhaili (寨里镇)
- Luocun (罗村镇)
- Hongshan (洪山镇)
- Shuangyang (双杨镇)
- Taihe (太河镇)

Townships

- Ezhuang Township (峨庄乡)
- Zhangzhuang Township (张庄乡)

== Climate ==
Climate data for Zichuan, elevation 95 m (312 ft), (1991–2020 normals, extremes 1981–2010)
Month	Jan	Feb	Mar	Apr	May	Jun	Jul	Aug	Sep	Oct	Nov	Dec	Year
Record high °C (°F)	19.1 (66.4)	25.6 (78.1)	30.8 (87.4)	35.9 (96.6)	38.1 (100.6)	41.0 (105.8)	40.8 (105.4)	37.7 (99.9)	37.7 (99.9)	34.5 (94.1)	26.5 (79.7)	19.5 (67.1)	41.0 (105.8)
Mean daily maximum °C (°F)	4.2 (39.6)	8.0 (46.4)	14.8 (58.6)	21.8 (71.2)	27.5 (81.5)	31.7 (89.1)	32.4 (90.3)	31.0 (87.8)	27.4 (81.3)	21.4 (70.5)	13.3 (55.9)	6.1 (43.0)	20.0 (67.9)
Daily mean °C (°F)	−1.1 (30.0)	2.4 (36.3)	8.8 (47.8)	15.7 (60.3)	21.7 (71.1)	26.0 (78.8)	27.6 (81.7)	26.1 (79.0)	21.6 (70.9)	15.3 (59.5)	7.6 (45.7)	0.9 (33.6)	14.4 (57.9)
Mean daily minimum °C (°F)	−5.1 (22.8)	−2.1 (28.2)	3.7 (38.7)	10.1 (50.2)	16.0 (60.8)	20.8 (69.4)	23.4 (74.1)	22.1 (71.8)	16.9 (62.4)	10.3 (50.5)	3.1 (37.6)	−3.0 (26.6)	9.7 (49.4)
Record low °C (°F)	−19.2 (−2.6)	−15.9 (3.4)	−10.0 (14.0)	−2.5 (27.5)	1.8 (35.2)	9.7 (49.5)	14.9 (58.8)	11.9 (53.4)	5.0 (41.0)	−1.7 (28.9)	−13.9 (7.0)	−21.8 (−7.2)	−21.8 (−7.2)
Average precipitation mm (inches)	6.9 (0.27)	14.1 (0.56)	14.5 (0.57)	31.4 (1.24)	63.9 (2.52)	80.2 (3.16)	161.8 (6.37)	195.0 (7.68)	64.1 (2.52)	32.0 (1.26)	27.1 (1.07)	10.0 (0.39)	701 (27.61)
Average precipitation days (≥ 0.1 mm)	2.9	3.7	3.8	5.6	7.2	8.8	12.5	12.7	7.4	5.5	4.6	3.7	78.4
Average snowy days	4.0	3.4	1.4	0.2	0	0	0	0	0	0	0.8	2.6	12.4
Average relative humidity (%)	57	53	47	50	53	57	72	77	70	64	62	59	60
Mean monthly sunshine hours	146.5	149.6	202.8	226.1	254.0	220.8	183.5	177.7	179.9	180.8	157.1	146.5	2,225.3
Percentage possible sunshine	47	48	54	57	58	50	41	43	49	52	52	49	50
Source: China Meteorological Administration

== Cityscape ==
Under the jurisdiction of Zichuan City, four street offices are set to take charge of the citizens' daily affairs such as education, sanitation and community services. Like many Chinese localities, there is hardly any strict division between different facilities or functional components. All neighborhoods, schools, hospitals, businesses, and shops are spread throughout the city without definition. Usually, the "city" is divided into these areas: Nanguan, Beiguan, Dongguan, Xiguan, Hongshan, Chengnan, Huangjiapu, etc.
Well-known landmarks of Zichuan City include Middle Streets, Liuquan Square, Lake Liuxian, Zichuan Garments Town, Liaozhai Town and Beishan Park.

== Economy ==
Zichuan has a typical economic structure of heavily industrialized zones. In 2008, Proportion of the first industry, the second industry and third industry is 1.88:63.63:34.49. Total GDP the year is 25.85 billion Yuan. The large concentration of architectural ceramics of Zichuan make 60% of the total output of Zibo's ceramics industry. They also count for 30% of the GDP in Zichuan. Zichuan also boasts for Zichuan Garments Town-one of China's biggest cloths markets. An annual Domestic trading expo of quite large scale is held within the market.
The cost living of Zichuan and the whole Zibo area is among the lowest in East China-the most prosperous region in China. Housing costs are still on a reasonable level along of the development of the economy. Housing prices of it is the third or fourth-highest of the five districts in Zibo.
