= Shandong University of Technology =

Public university in Zibo, China

Coordinates: 36°40′36″N 117°10′45″E

- 山东理工大学 (Chinese)
- Type: Public
- Established: 1956
- President: Yuxia Li
- Faculty: 2,292
- Students: 39,300
- Location: Zibo, Shandong, China
- Website: www.sdut.edu.cn

Chinese name
- Simplified Chinese: 山东理工大学
- Traditional Chinese: 山東理工大學
Transcriptions
Standard Mandarin
- Hanyu Pinyin: Shāndōng Lǐgōng Dàxué

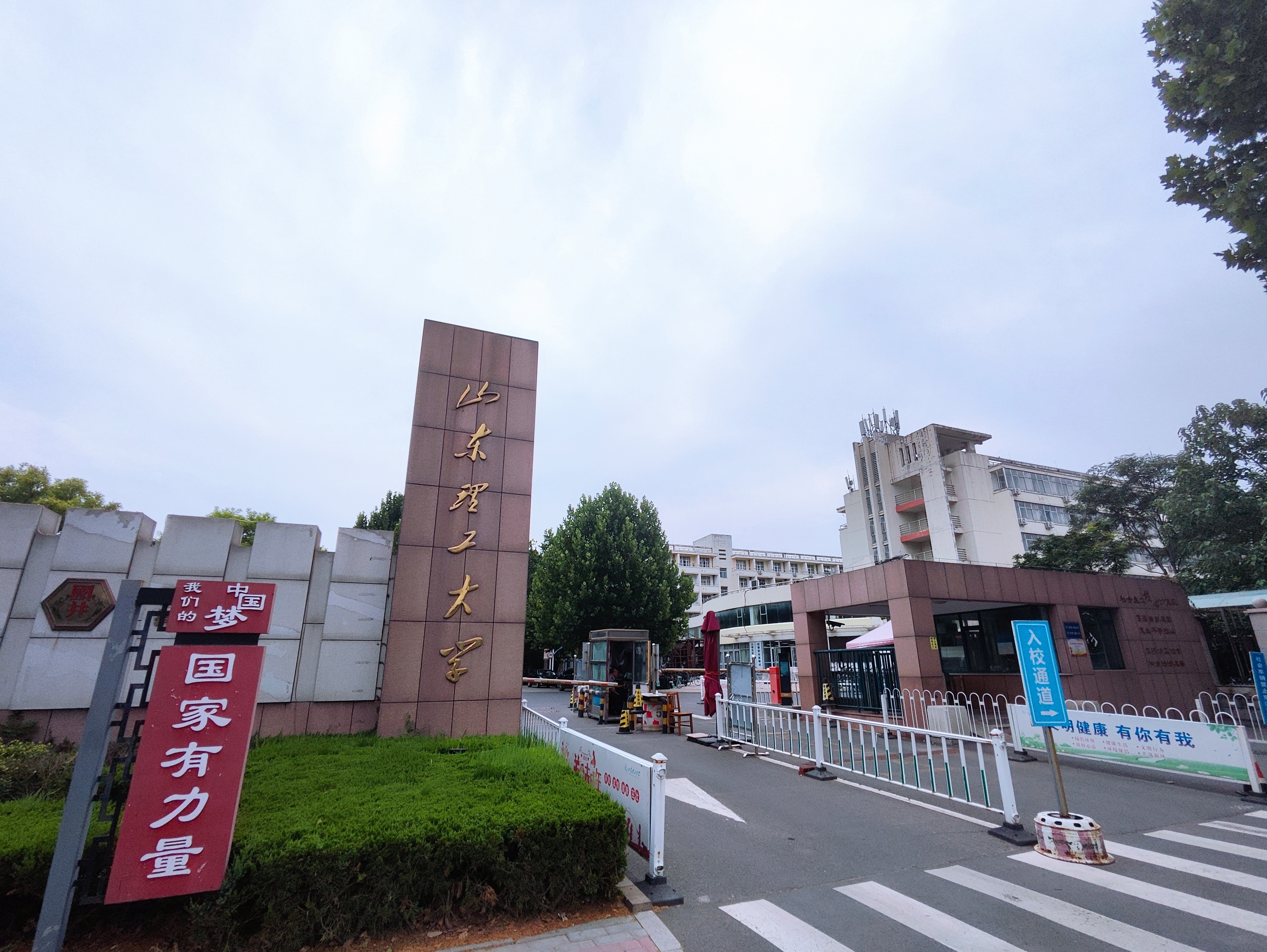
North Gate of West Campus of Shandong University of Technology

The Shandong University of Technology (SDUT; Chinese: 山东理工大学) is a university located in Zibo, Shandong, China. The university was founded in 1956 and has a focus on engineering sciences.

== History ==
The school was founded as the Shandong Institute of Technology (山东工程学院) in June 1956. During the Cultural Revolution, it was one of only 13 undergraduate institutions of higher learning in Shandong. It expanded into a wider institution of polytechnic learning in 1990. Finally in 2001, it merged with several other colleges into a full university under its current name.

== Campus ==
SDUT occupies two campuses, both located in the Zhangdian District of Zibo. Together, they cover an area of approximately 2.4 million square meters, with a building area of 1.3 million square meters. The campus features 268 lecture halls with multi-media facilities and 21 laboratories.

The headquarters for the Shandong Research Institute of Engineering and Technology is also located on the SDUT campus.

== Students ==
There are 34,000 full-time undergraduate students and 5,300 postgraduate students enrolled at SDUT. Undergraduate students can elect to study 21 different subjects spanning nine categories: engineering, science, economics, management, literature, law, history, pedagogy, and art.

Masters' students have the choice of 14 subjects for engineering, five subjects in agricultural extension, as well as the subjects for a Master of Business Administration (MBA) and a Master of Finance (MF).

== Academic Schools ==
School of Transportation & Vehicle Engineering

School of Agricultural Engineering& food science

School of Electrical & Electronic Engineering

School of Computer Science & Technology

School of Chemical Engineering

School of Architectural Engineering

School of Resources & Environment Engineering

School of Materials Science & Engineering

School of Life Science

School of Science

School of Business

MBA Education Centre

School of Literature & Media Dissemination

School of Foreign Languages

School of Laws

School Of Marxism

School of Fine Arts

School of Music

School of Physical Education

Lutai textile college

School of Innovation and Entrepreneurship

== Programme List ==
The Shandong University of Technology offers Bachelor's, Masters, and Doctoral Degrees for international students wishing to study in China. Undergraduate and Postgraduate courses range from studying the Arts to Mechanical Engineering, Chinese Philology to Economy.

SDUT has 12 Doctoral Degrees that specialize in different areas of Engineering and Technology.
