= Gaoqing County =

Gaoqing County 高青县
- County
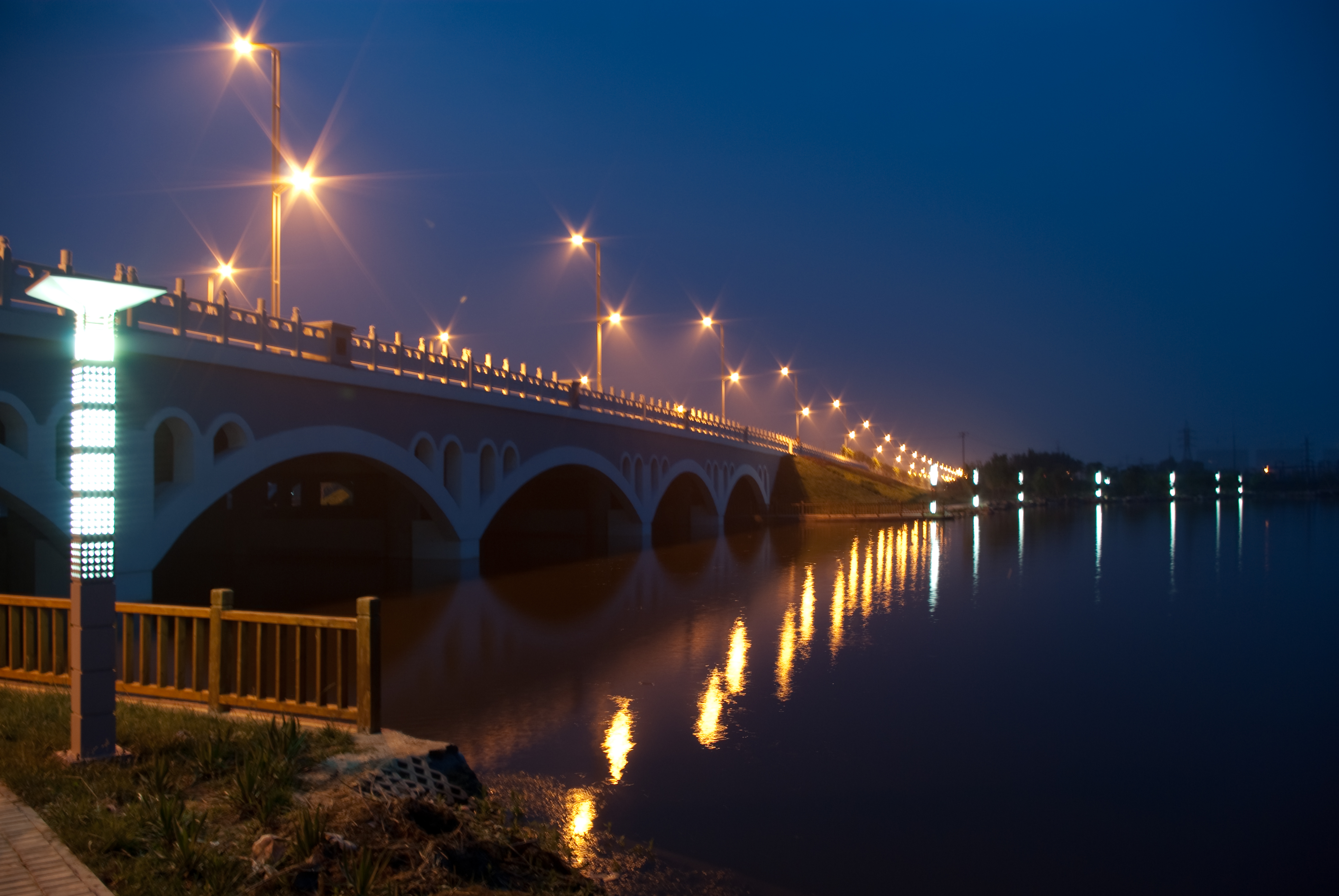
- Night Scene of Gaoqing County

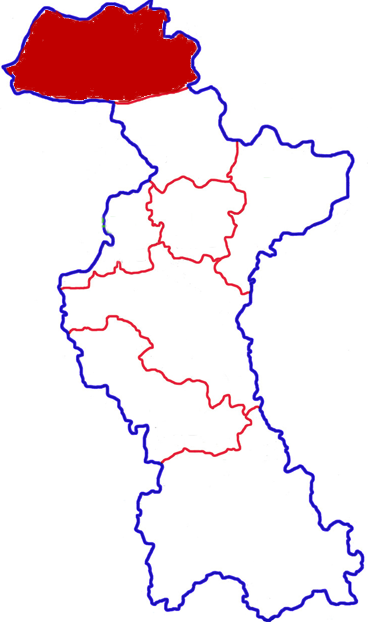
- Location in Zibo

- Location in Shandong
- Coordinates: 37°10′N 117°50′E
- Country: People's Republic of China
- Province: Shandong
- Prefecture-level city: Zibo

Area
  - Total: 831 km^{2} (321 sq mi)
- Elevation: 11 m (36 ft)
- Time zone: UTC+8 (China Standard)
- Area code: +86 0533

Gaoqing County (simplified Chinese: 高青县; traditional Chinese: 高青縣; pinyin: Gāoqīng Xiàn) is a county of northern Shandong province, People's Republic of China. It is the northernmost division of Zibo City.

The population in 1999 was 355405.

== Administrative divisions ==
As of 2012, this County is divided to 9 towns.

Towns

- Tian (田镇)
- Qingcheng (青城镇)
- Gaocheng (高城镇)
- Heilizhai (黑里寨镇)
- Tangfang (唐坊镇)
- Changjia (常家镇)
- Huagou (花沟镇)
- Zhaodian (赵店镇)
- Muli (木李镇)

== Climate ==
Climate data for Gaoqing, elevation 12 m (39 ft), (1991–2020 normals, extremes 1981–present)
Month	Jan	Feb	Mar	Apr	May	Jun	Jul	Aug	Sep	Oct	Nov	Dec	Year
Record high °C (°F)	19.8 (67.6)	24.3 (75.7)	31.6 (88.9)	35.0 (95.0)	39.8 (103.6)	41.8 (107.2)	40.3 (104.5)	38.0 (100.4)	37.1 (98.8)	32.3 (90.1)	27.3 (81.1)	21.0 (69.8)	41.8 (107.2)
Mean daily maximum °C (°F)	3.6 (38.5)	7.6 (45.7)	14.2 (57.6)	21.3 (70.3)	27.0 (80.6)	31.5 (88.7)	32.2 (90.0)	30.6 (87.1)	27.2 (81.0)	21.1 (70.0)	12.7 (54.9)	5.4 (41.7)	19.5 (67.2)
Daily mean °C (°F)	−2.2 (28.0)	1.1 (34.0)	7.5 (45.5)	14.7 (58.5)	20.7 (69.3)	25.3 (77.5)	27.2 (81.0)	25.8 (78.4)	21.2 (70.2)	14.5 (58.1)	6.5 (43.7)	−0.2 (31.6)	13.5 (56.3)
Mean daily minimum °C (°F)	−6.5 (20.3)	−3.7 (25.3)	1.9 (35.4)	8.6 (47.5)	14.5 (58.1)	19.6 (67.3)	22.9 (73.2)	21.9 (71.4)	16.4 (61.5)	9.2 (48.6)	1.8 (35.2)	−4.3 (24.3)	8.5 (47.3)
Record low °C (°F)	−19.2 (−2.6)	−16.3 (2.7)	−10.0 (14.0)	−1.3 (29.7)	3.6 (38.5)	10.7 (51.3)	16.4 (61.5)	13.3 (55.9)	5.0 (41.0)	−3.0 (26.6)	−11.7 (10.9)	−19.0 (−2.2)	−19.2 (−2.6)
Average precipitation mm (inches)	4.8 (0.19)	9.5 (0.37)	10.0 (0.39)	26.5 (1.04)	54.2 (2.13)	84.3 (3.32)	153.0 (6.02)	157.3 (6.19)	44.8 (1.76)	27.2 (1.07)	22.2 (0.87)	5.7 (0.22)	599.5 (23.57)
Average precipitation days (≥ 0.1 mm)	2.0	3.0	3.0	5.0	6.5	7.9	11.1	10.4	6.1	5.5	4.2	2.6	67.3
Average snowy days	2.9	2.7	1.2	0.1	0	0	0	0	0	0	0.9	2.3	10.1
Average relative humidity (%)	61	57	52	54	59	63	76	80	73	68	66	64	64
Mean monthly sunshine hours	153.7	155.6	208.8	228.6	257.6	220.8	184.9	190.8	194.3	189.3	158.0	147.0	2,289.4
Percentage possible sunshine	50	51	56	58	59	50	42	46	53	55	52	50	52
Source: China Meteorological Administrationall-time August record
