= Tangfang Township, Shaanxi =

Tangfang Township 汤坊乡
- Township
- Location within China
- Coordinates: 34°14′19″N 108°21′52″E
- Country: China
- Province: Shaanxi
- Prefecture-level city: Xianyang
- County-level city: Xingping
- Elevation: 422 m (1,385 ft)
- Time zone: UTC+8 (China Standard)
- Postal code: 610481

Tangfang Township (simplified Chinese: 汤坊乡; traditional Chinese: 湯坊鄉; pinyin: Tāngfāng Xiāng) is a township in west-central Shaanxi province, Northwest China, located more than 50 kilometres (31 mi) west of the provincial capital of Xi'an. It is under the administration of Xingping, 13 kilometres (8.1 mi) to the east-northeast.

Situated along a major east–west road connecting the provincial capital, Xi'an, to Baoji, Tangfang has regular transport links into Fufeng County.

It lies north of the Wei River yet is not on the floodplain.

== Economy ==
The main staple of the people in Tangfang is agriculture and farming. There is also a brick works / storage site in the village.
