= Zibo =

Zibo 淄博市 Tsibo
- Prefecture-level city
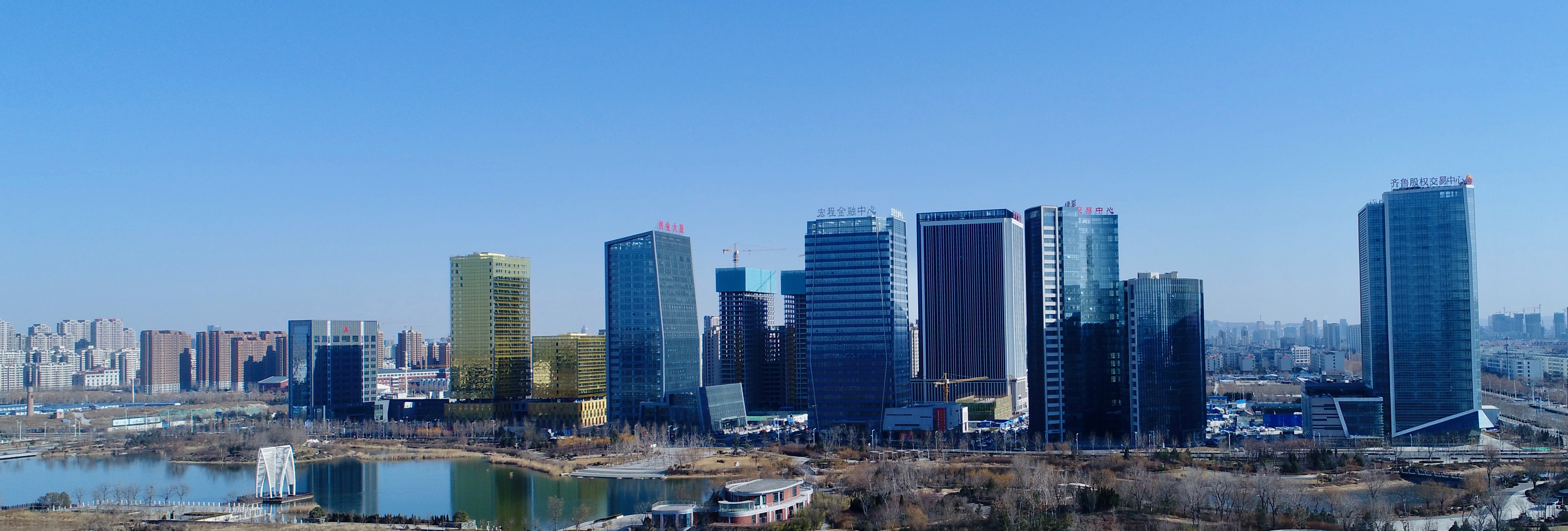
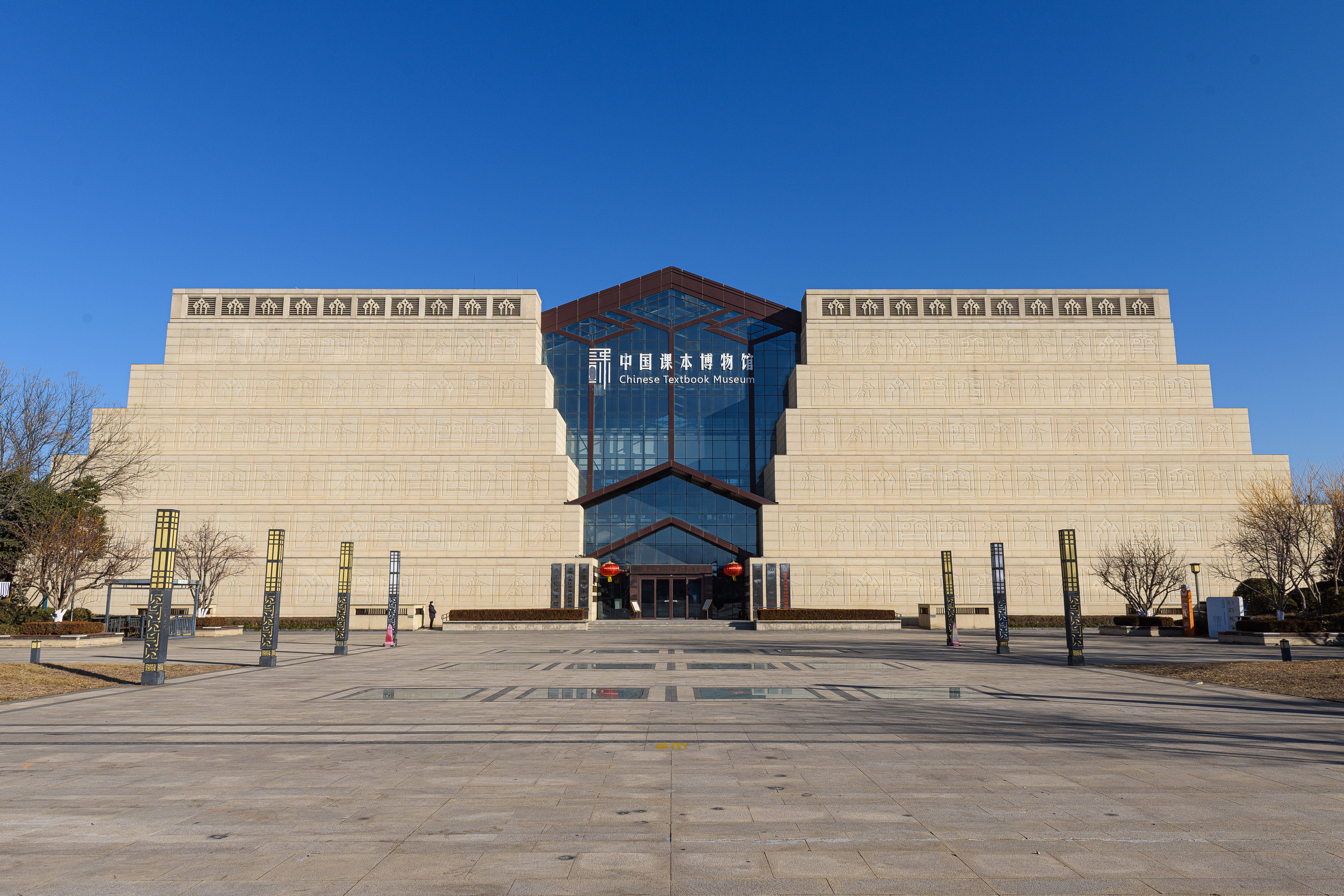
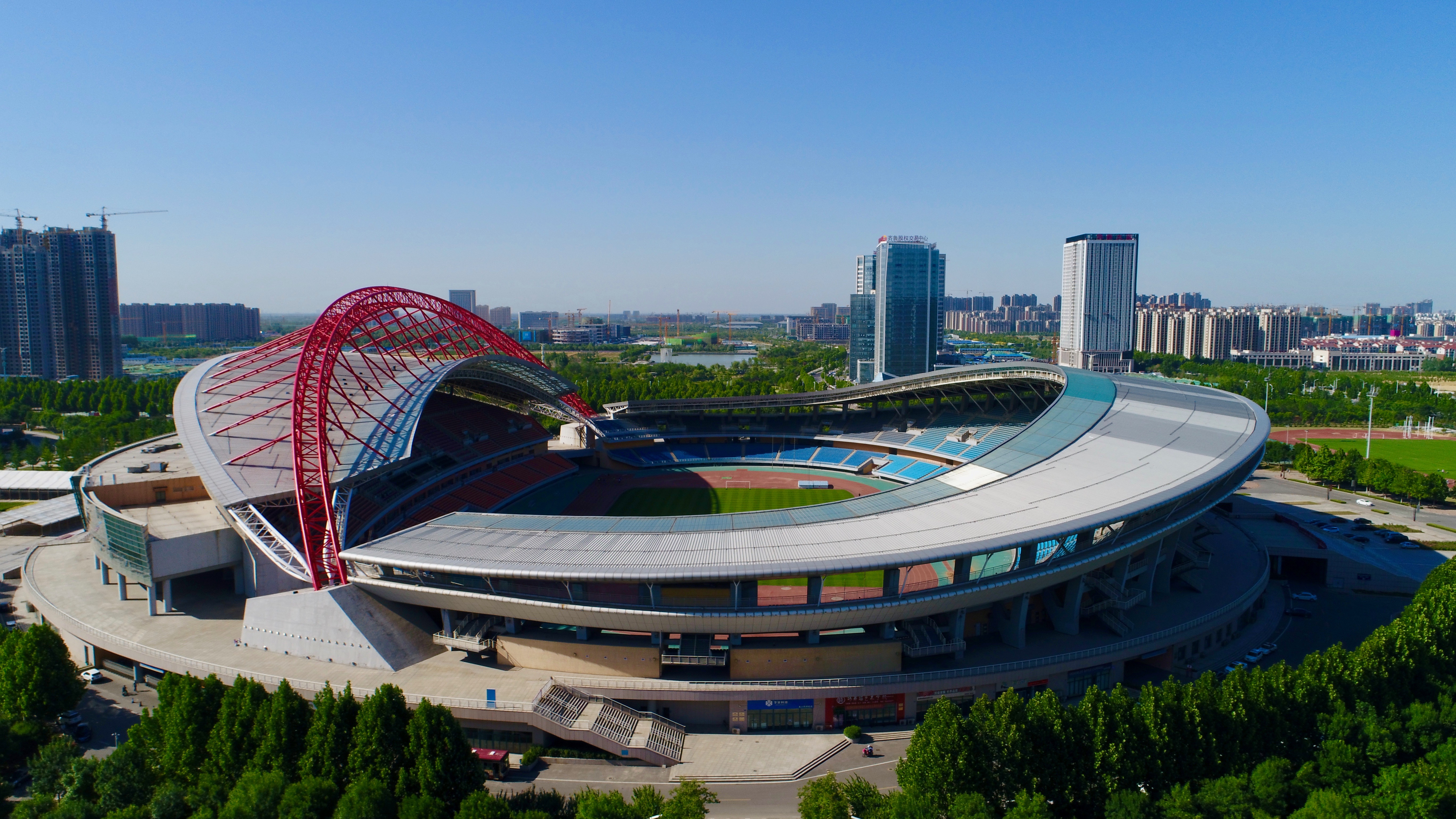
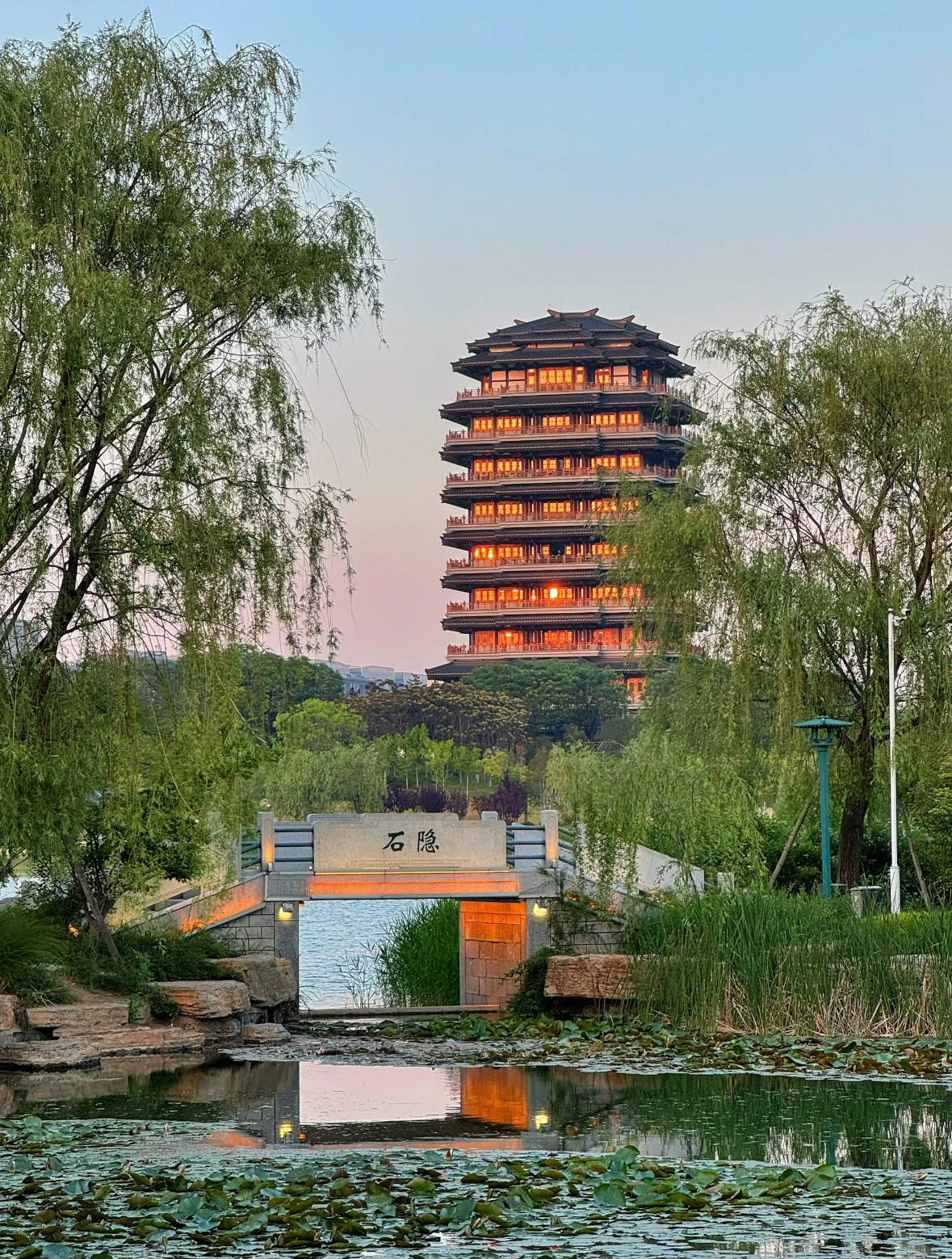
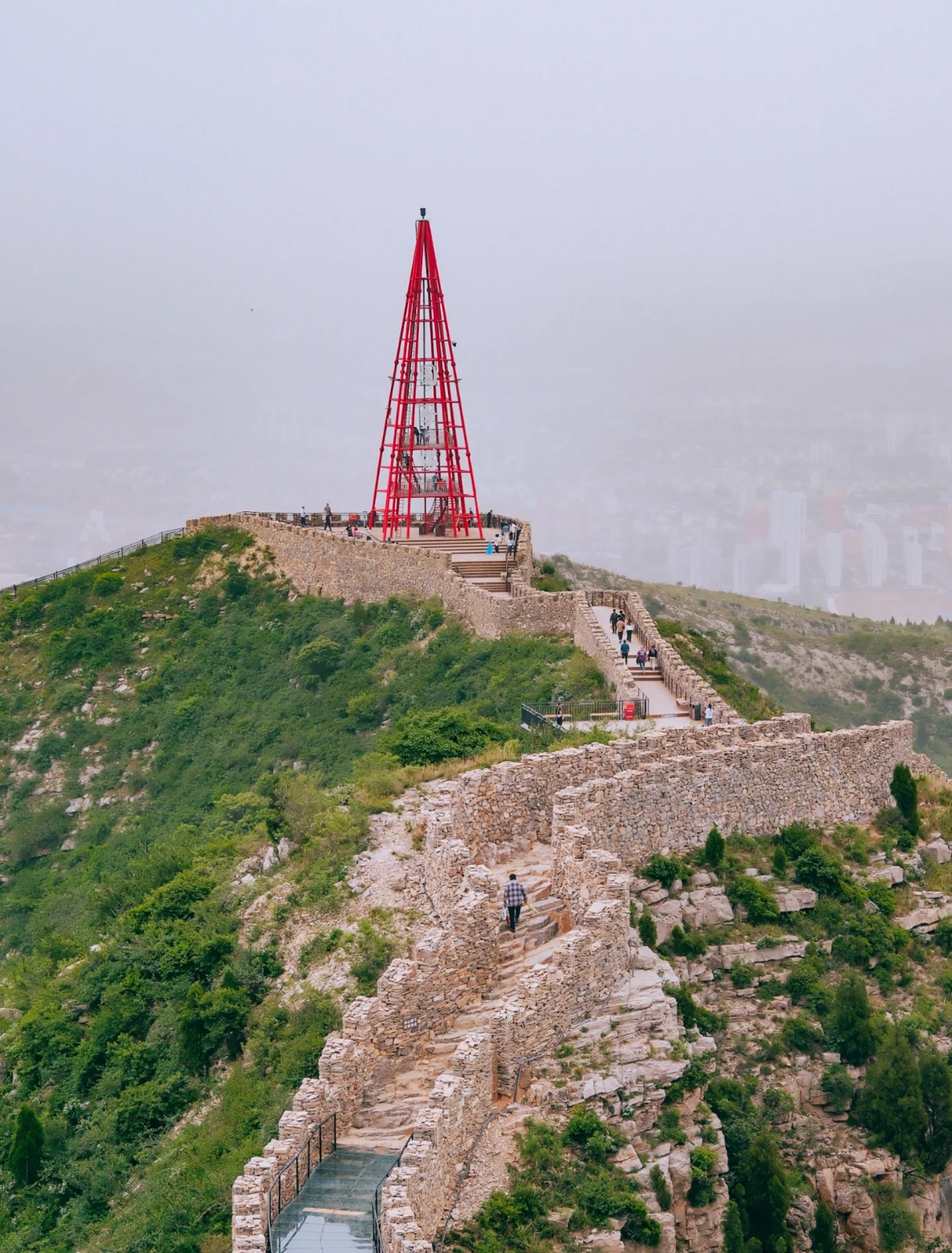
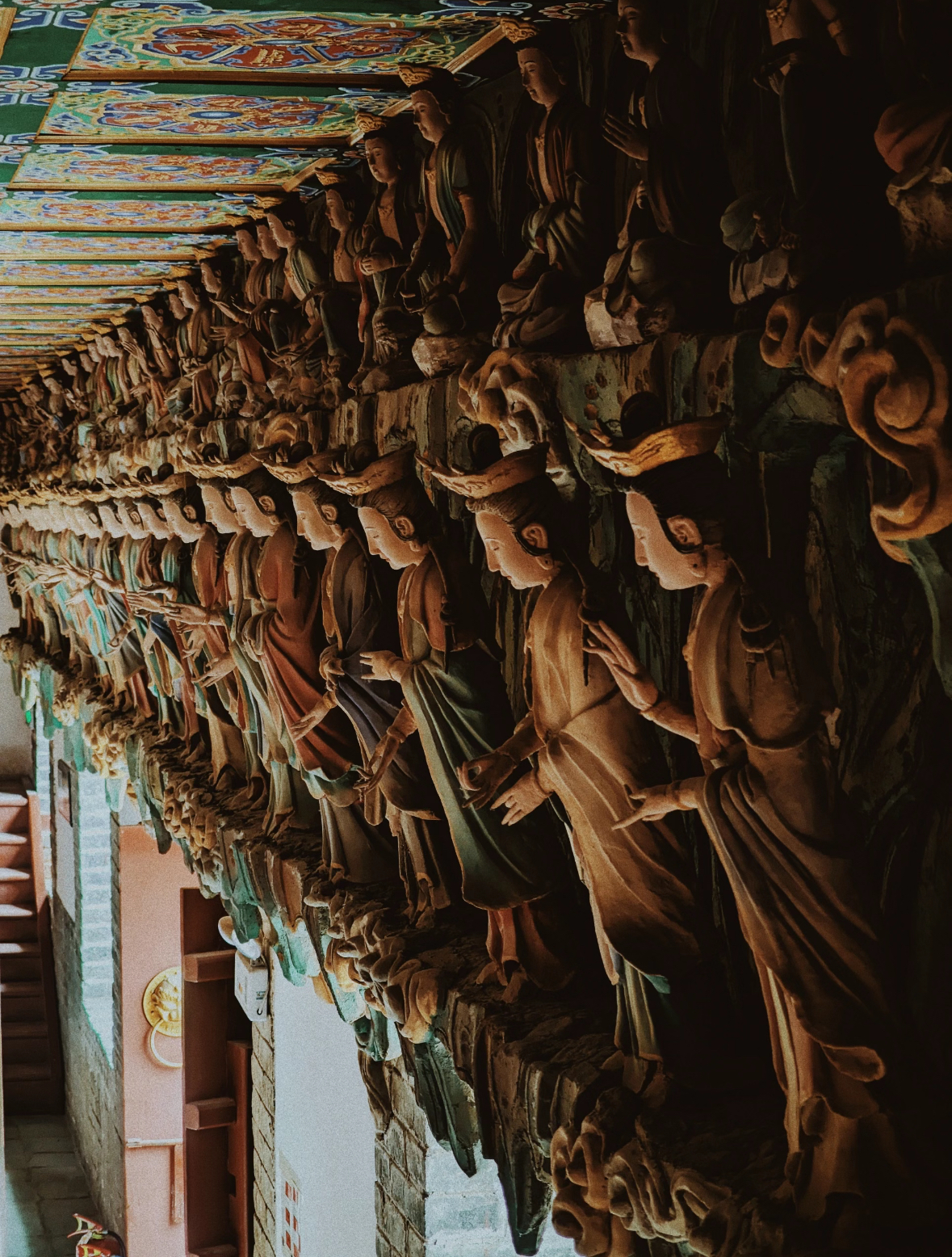
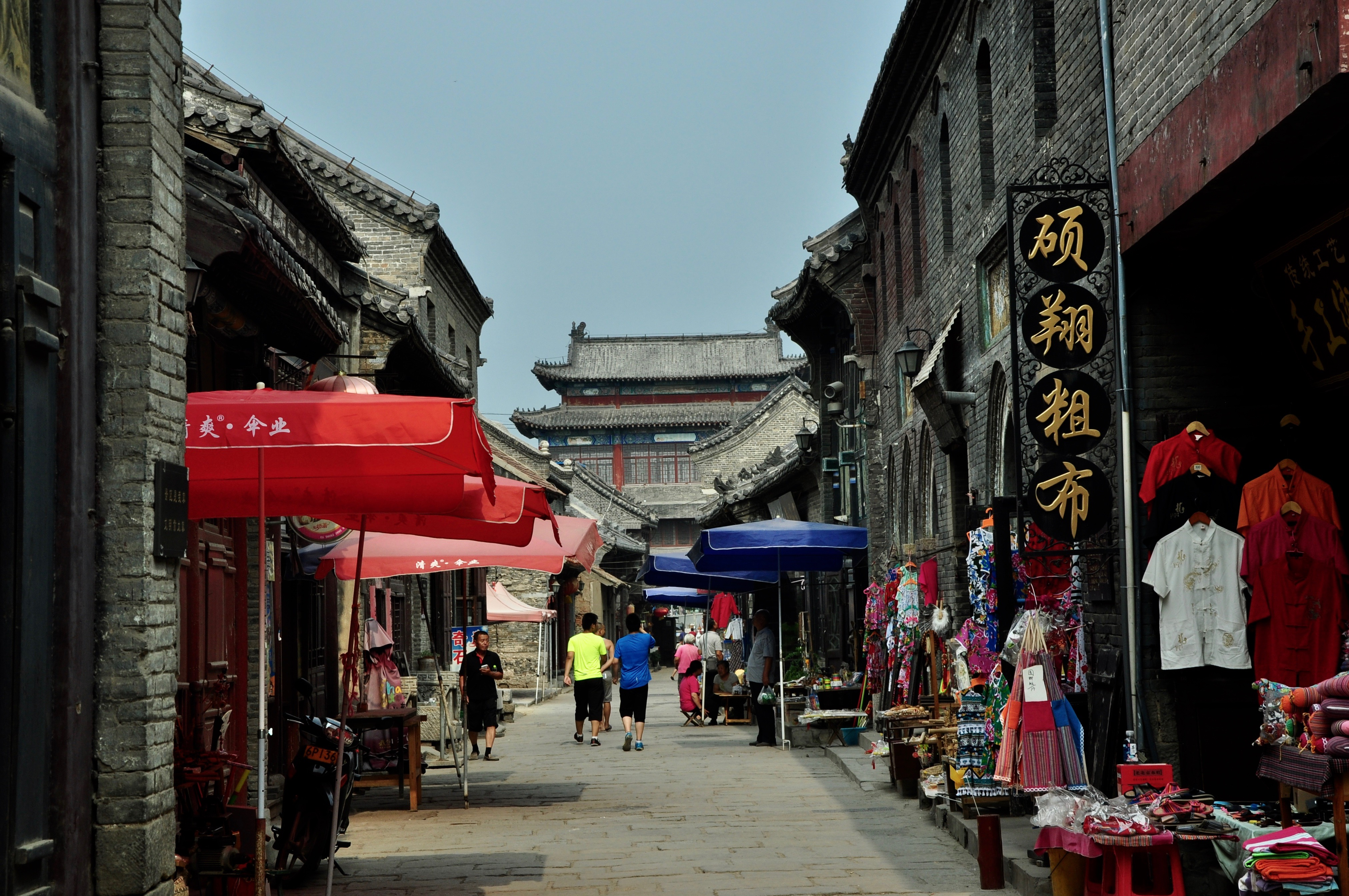
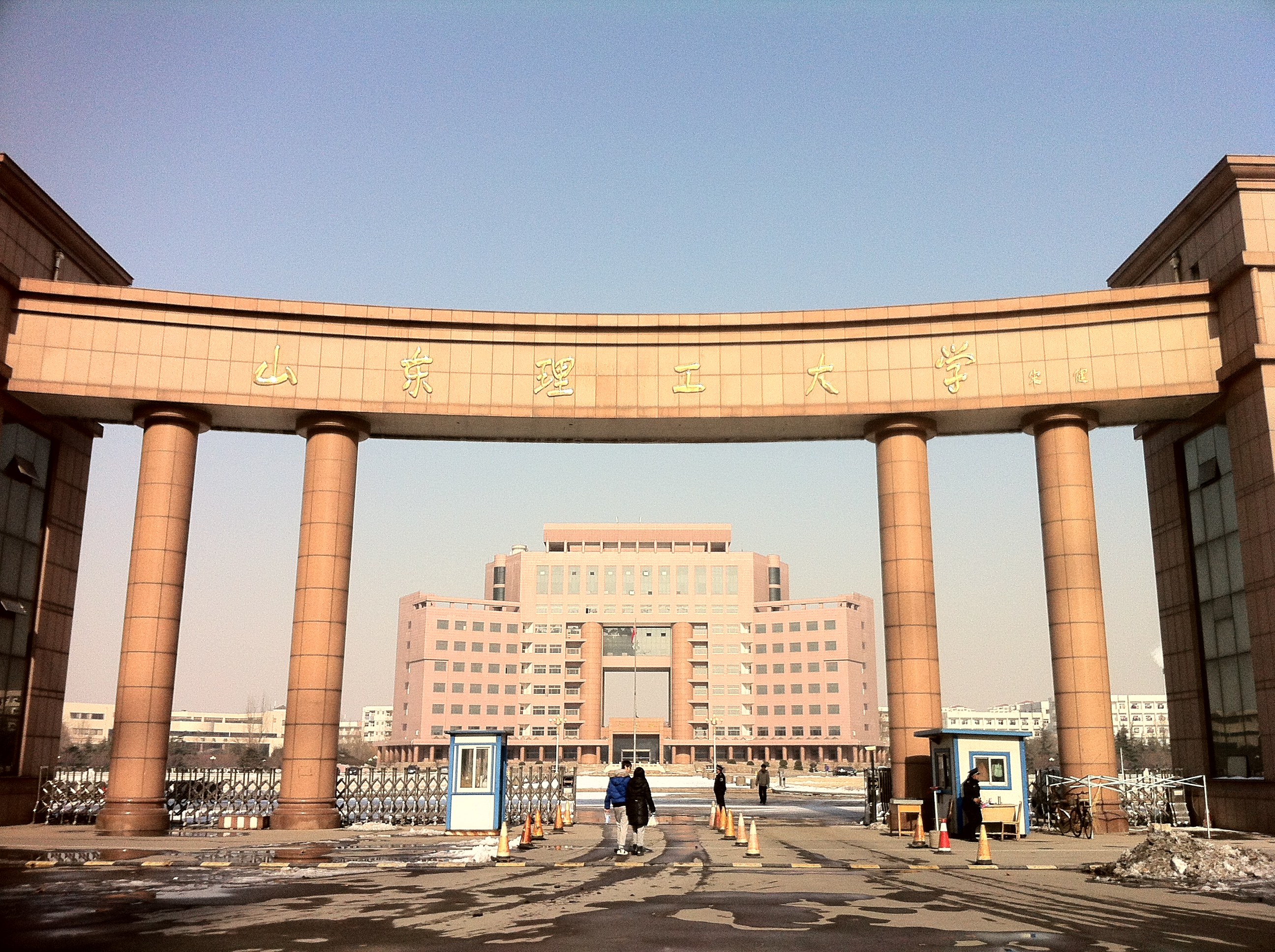
- Skyline of Zibo CBD Textbook Museum of China Zibo Stadium Haidai Tower Red Persimmon Rock Thousand Buddha Temple Zhoucun Ancient Town Shandong University of Technology

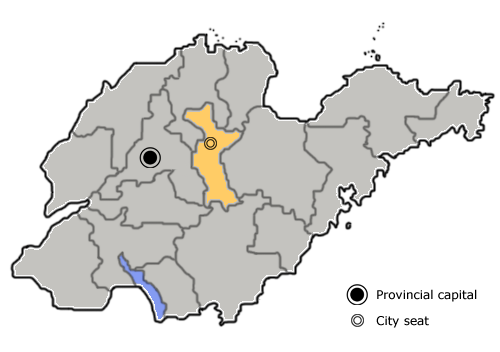
- Location of Zibo in Shandong

- Location in the North China Plain Zibo (China)
- Coordinates (Zibo municipal government): 36°48′50″N 118°03′18″E
- Country: People's Republic of China
- Province: Shandong
- County-level divisions: 8
- Township divisions: 106
- Municipal seat: Zhangdian District

Government
  - Mayor: Yu Haitian (于海田)

Area
  - Prefecture-level city: 5,965 km^{2} (2,303 sq mi)
  - Urban: 2,989 km^{2} (1,154 sq mi)
  - Metro: 4,748 km^{2} (1,833 sq mi)
- Highest elevation: 1,108.3 m (3,636 ft)
- Lowest elevation: 7 m (23 ft)

Population (2020 census)
  - Prefecture-level city: 4,704,138
  - Density: 788.6/km^{2} (2,043/sq mi)
  - Urban: 3,493,664
  - Urban density: 1,169/km^{2} (3,027/sq mi)
  - Metro: 4,412,026
  - Metro density: 929.2/km^{2} (2,407/sq mi)

GDP
  - Prefecture-level city: CN¥ 507 billion US$ 76.6 billion
  - Per capita: CN¥ 107,720; US$ 16,278
- Time zone: UTC+08:00 (China Standard)
- Postal Code: 255100
- Area code: 0533
- ISO 3166 code: CN-SD-03
- License Plate Prefix: 鲁C
- Website: www.zibo.gov.cn

Zibo
- "Zibo" in regular Chinese characters
- Chinese: 淄博
Transcriptions
Standard Mandarin
- Hanyu Pinyin: Zībó
- Wade–Giles: Tzu^{1}-po^{2}
- IPA: [tsɨ́.pwǒ]
Yue: Cantonese
- Yale Romanization: Jī-bok
- Jyutping: Zi^{1}-bok^{3}
- IPA: [tsi˥ pɔk̚˧]
Southern Min
- Tâi-lô: Tshî-phok

Zibo (Chinese: 淄博; pinyin: Zībó) is a prefecture-level city in central Shandong province, China. It borders the provincial capital Jinan to the west, Tai'an to the southwest, Linyi to the south, Weifang to the east, Dongying to the northeast, and Binzhou to the north.

Zibo spans 5,938 square kilometres (2,293 sq mi). As of the 2020 census, Zibo's population was 4,704,138, of which 4.41 million lived in the metro area comprising five urban districts—Zhangdian, Zichuan, Boshan, Zhoucun and Linzi–and parts of neighboring counties Huantai, Gaoqing, and Yiyuan.

The Zibo area was the centre of the ancient State of Qi, whose capital Linzi was the most populous city in China at its peak. Pu Songling, a well-known writer of the Qing dynasty, is one of the most famous people from Zibo. As the birthplace of Qi culture, Zibo is a notable tourist city.

Manufacturingholds an important place in the city’s economy, particularly ceramics manufacturing.

Other key industries include the petrochemical industry, pharmaceuticals, metallurgy, construction materials, machinery and textiles. New industries and high-technology industries, such new materials, fine chemicals, electronics, IT, and biopharmaceutics are also developing rapidly.

According to the 2007-08 Global City Competitiveness Report released by the Chinese Academy of Social Sciences, Zibo was among the top 20 cities in the world in terms of fast economic growth between 2001 and 2005. According to the Oriental Outlook Magazine, Zibo ranks No. 1 on the list of cities that have reasonable real estate prices in China, also ranking No. 2 on the list of cities with good public security in China in 2008. In 2009, the city received the award of "Best 10 Harmonious Cities that enjoy Sustainable Development in China".

== History ==
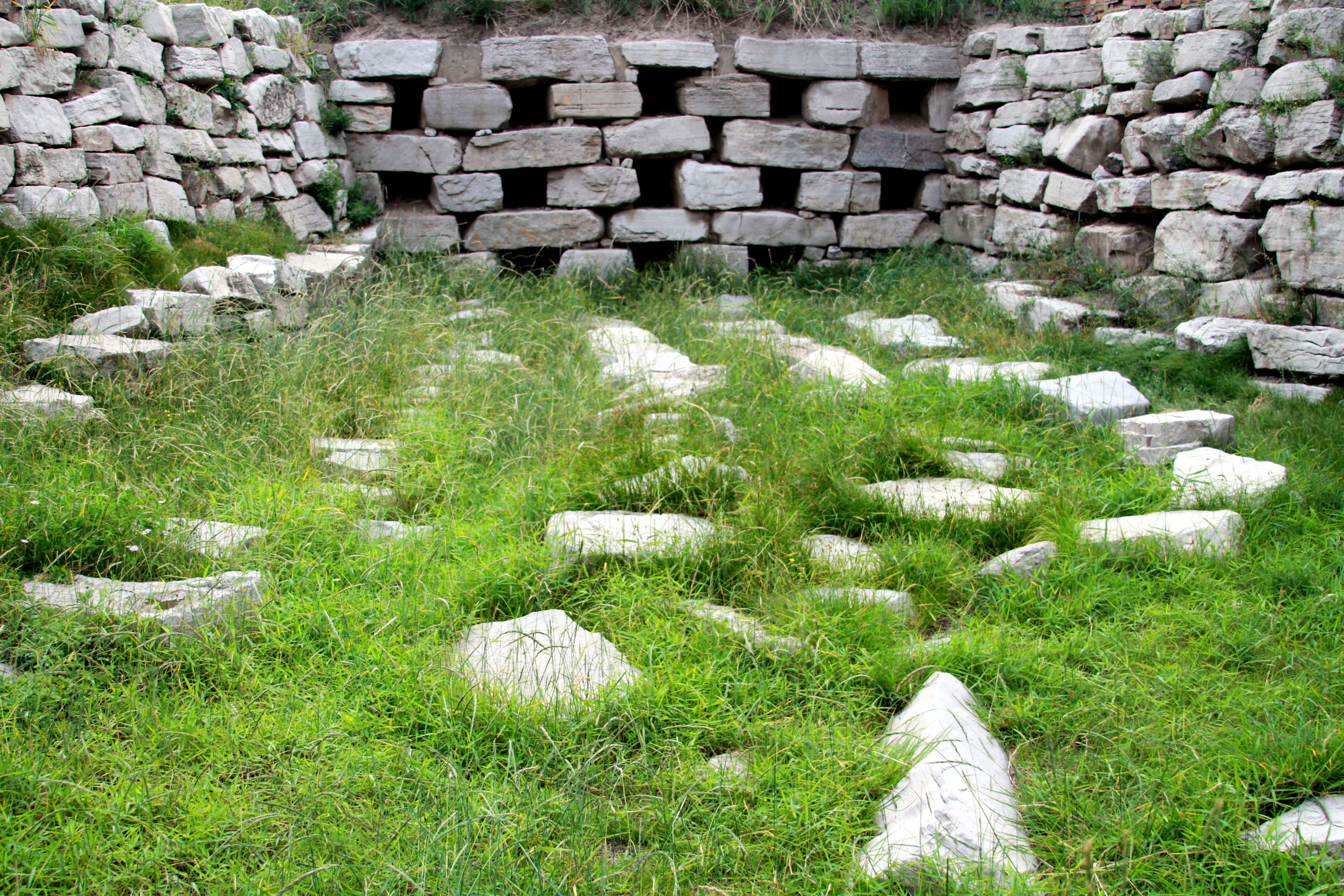
Remains of city sewer passing underneath the former city wall

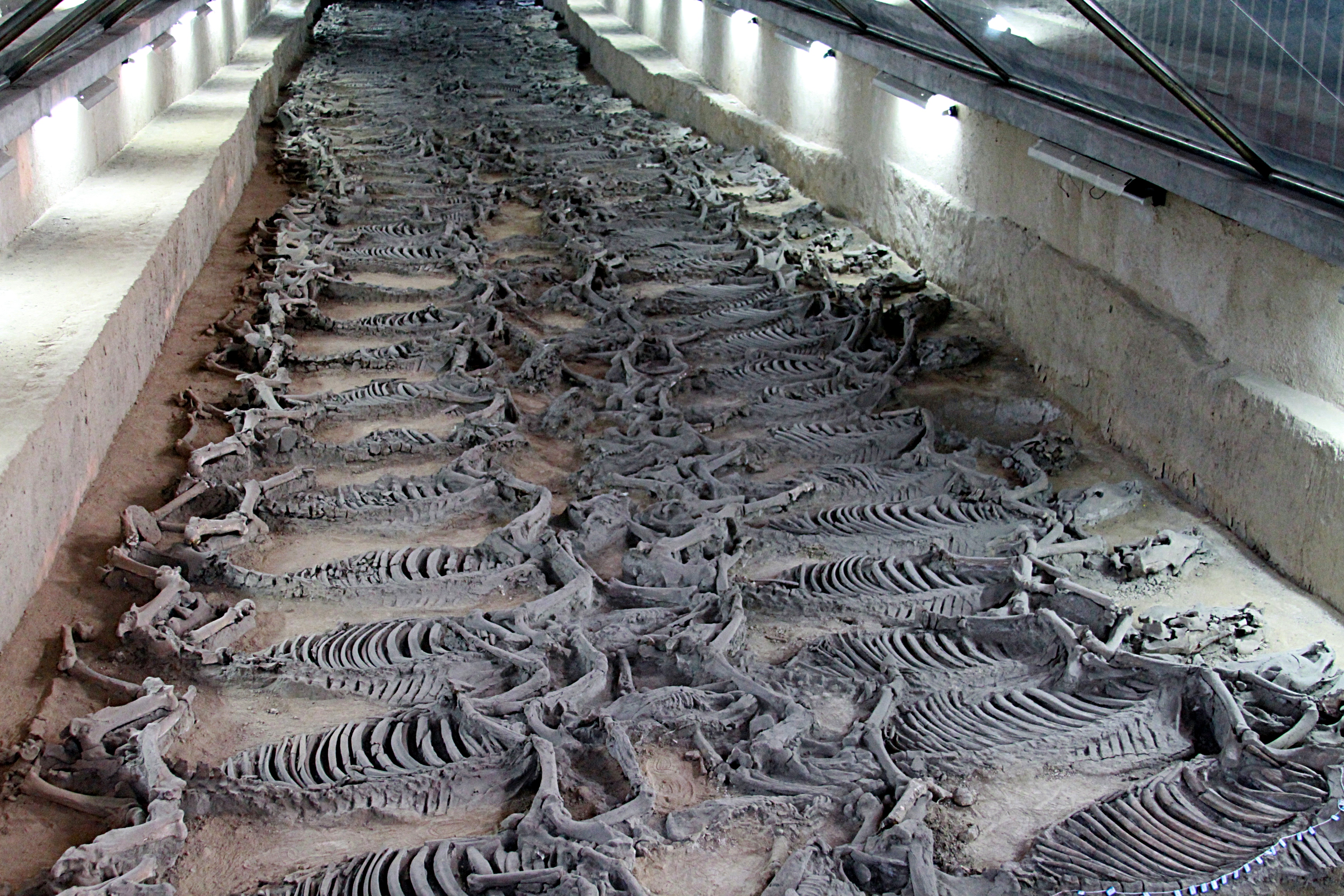
Sacrificial horses in the tomb of Duke Jing of Qi, discovered in Linzi

The remains of three major Neolithic cultures in ancient China, Beixin culture, Dawenkou culture, and Longshan culture have been found in Zibo. Ancient Linzi, located in present-day Zibo, was the capital of the ancient State of Qi, a powerful state during the Spring and Autumn and the Warring States periods, over 2,000 years ago. In 7th century BC, Duke Huan of Qi, ruler of Qi, appointed Guan Zhong, thinker and economist, as his prime minister, and adopted Guan's thoughts and policies to administer his country, develop the economy and develop relations with other states. The measures greatly strengthened the country, making its capital one of the most prosperous in ancient China. Zibo is rich in cultural and historical sites, and is referred to as the "Underground Museum". In Linzi, the ruins of the ancient Qi city, as well as other famous cultural relics and historic sites, have been discovered and unearthed. The ancient city of Qi was one of the first places in China that was assigned to be a "cultural relics site" and protected.

Zibo made significant contributions to the formation and prosperity of the Silk Road. Zibo was one of the biggest suppliers of silk products. Zhoucun, one of the townships in Zibo, was considered one of the four 'dry ports' alongside Foshan, Jingdezhen, and Zhuxian. The major trade streets, such as ‘Dajie’, ‘Sishijie’, and ‘Yinzije’, are well preserved to this day.

In 2004, FIFA president Sepp Blatter visited Zibo to celebrate FIFA's 100th anniversary. A 2nd Century BC military manual from the area mentions the game Cuju, which is the earliest known reference to a football-like game worldwide.

Zibo City was established in 1954. The name came from a combination of the prefecture's two major urban areas, Zichuan and Boshan.

== Administrative divisions ==
The prefecture-level city of Zibo administers eight county-level divisions, including five districts and three counties.

Map	Subdivision	Chinese	Pinyin	Population (2020)
	Zichuan District	淄川区	Zīchuān Qū	646,685
	Zhangdian District	张店区	Zhāngdiàn Qū	1,272,967
	Boshan District	博山区	Bóshān Qū	410,643
	Linzi District	临淄区	Línzī Qū	649,160
	Zhoucun District	周村区	Zhōucūn Qū	407,016
	Huantai County	桓台县	Huántái Xiàn	489,479
	Gaoqing County	高青县	Gāoqīng Xiàn	313,130
	Yiyuan County	沂源县	Yíyuán Xiàn	515,058

== Geography ==
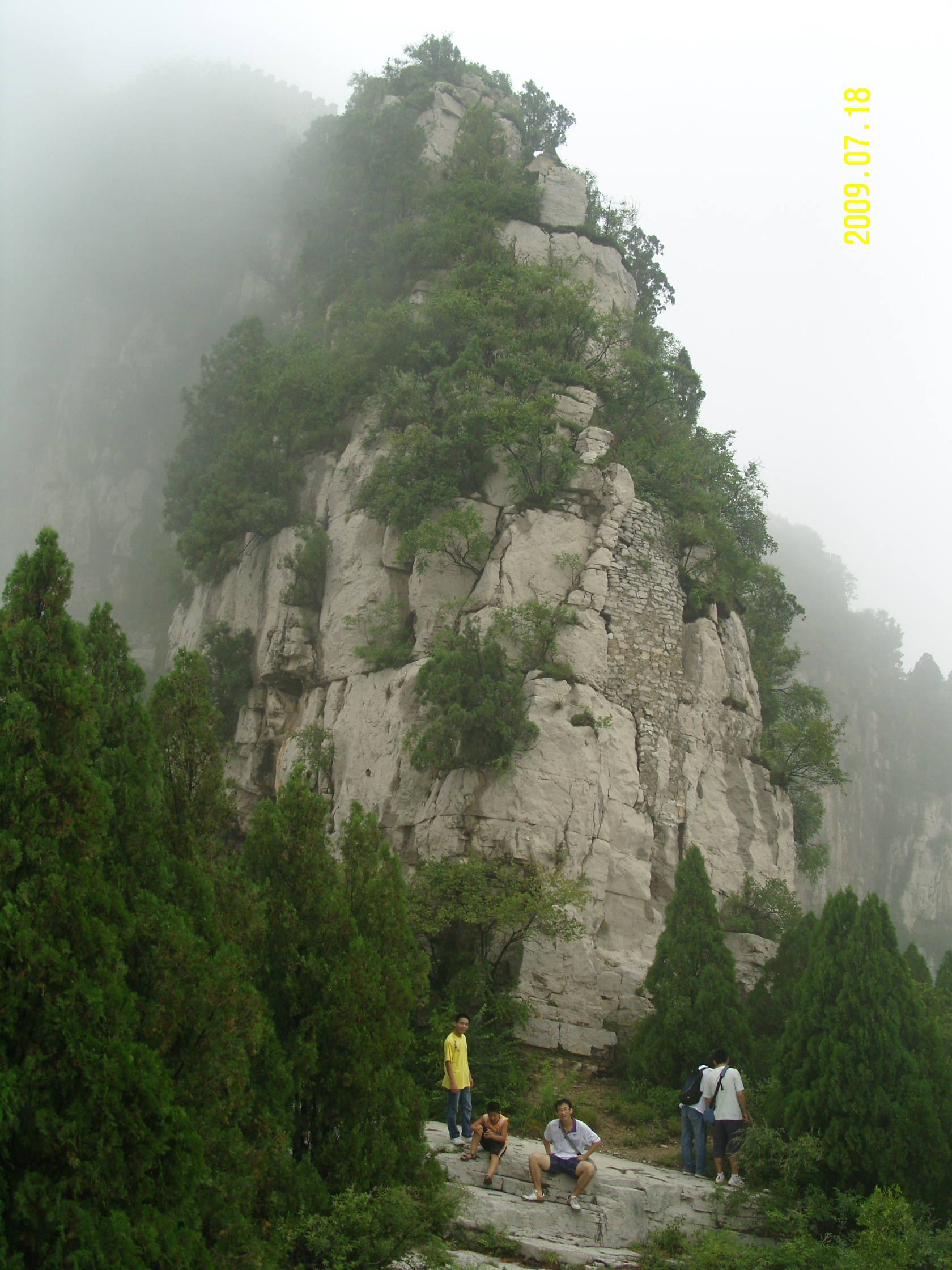
Saddle Mountain, one of the highest mountains in Zibo

Zibo is located near the center of Shandong Province, neighboring Mt. Tai in the south and backing the Yellow River in the north. Toward the east are the coastal cities of Qingdao, Yantai, and Weihai. The capital of Shandong, Jinan is to its west. Zibo is located in the transition zone between the mountainous area in central Shandong and the North China Plain. Its southern area is covered with mid-sized mountains, while the center is hilly. The city's northern territory descends into plains. The ratio among mountains, hills and plains are 42%, 29.9% and 28.1%, respectively. With the Yihe River originating itself in the southern mountain area, and Yellow River flowing across the northern area, the city has comparatively abundant water resources. The workable reserve of ground water is 1.24 tons/day.

=== Climate ===
Zibo is located in a warm, temperate zone, and bears a semi-humid and semi-dry continental climate. Like other cities in the province, Zibo has four distinct seasons. January and July are, respectively, the coldest and hottest months during the year. Zibo enjoys a growing season of 180 to 220 days and the average annual hours of sunshine are 2542.6 to 2832.6. The annual average precipitation of Zibo is 25.2 inches (640.5 mm).

Climate data for Zibo, elevation 34 m (112 ft), (1991–2020 normals, extremes 1981–2010)
Month	Jan	Feb	Mar	Apr	May	Jun	Jul	Aug	Sep	Oct	Nov	Dec	Year
Record high °C (°F)	20.7 (69.3)	26.3 (79.3)	30.2 (86.4)	35.0 (95.0)	38.1 (100.6)	41.6 (106.9)	40.4 (104.7)	37.7 (99.9)	39.6 (103.3)	35.2 (95.4)	27.4 (81.3)	19.5 (67.1)	41.6 (106.9)
Mean daily maximum °C (°F)	4.2 (39.6)	7.8 (46.0)	15.2 (59.4)	21.2 (70.2)	27.5 (81.5)	31.8 (89.2)	32.6 (90.7)	31.0 (87.8)	27.4 (81.3)	21.5 (70.7)	12.8 (55.0)	5.8 (42.4)	19.9 (67.8)
Daily mean °C (°F)	−1.8 (28.8)	1.6 (34.9)	8.5 (47.3)	14.7 (58.5)	21.1 (70.0)	25.7 (78.3)	27.4 (81.3)	25.9 (78.6)	21.3 (70.3)	14.7 (58.5)	6.9 (44.4)	0.0 (32.0)	13.8 (56.9)
Mean daily minimum °C (°F)	−6.4 (20.5)	−3.2 (26.2)	2.5 (36.5)	8.4 (47.1)	14.7 (58.5)	19.8 (67.6)	22.8 (73.0)	21.8 (71.2)	16.4 (61.5)	9.3 (48.7)	2.1 (35.8)	−4.4 (24.1)	8.6 (47.6)
Record low °C (°F)	−18.0 (−0.4)	−14.7 (5.5)	−9.6 (14.7)	−2.1 (28.2)	2.2 (36.0)	10.4 (50.7)	15.6 (60.1)	11.1 (52.0)	6.5 (43.7)	−0.9 (30.4)	−11.7 (10.9)	−18.9 (−2.0)	−18.9 (−2.0)
Average precipitation mm (inches)	5.8 (0.23)	12.8 (0.50)	12.7 (0.50)	28.1 (1.11)	60.3 (2.37)	75.3 (2.96)	140.5 (5.53)	163.6 (6.44)	53.7 (2.11)	28.1 (1.11)	26.3 (1.04)	8.9 (0.35)	616.1 (24.25)
Average precipitation days (≥ 0.1 mm)	2.5	3.3	4.1	5.6	6.9	7.9	12.1	11.6	6.7	5.6	4.7	3.6	74.6
Average snowy days	3.5	3.0	1.2	0.2	0	0	0	0	0	0	0.7	2.3	10.9
Average relative humidity (%)	58	54	49	52	56	58	72	76	68	64	63	61	61
Mean monthly sunshine hours	152.5	156.9	208.9	231.7	262.1	226.4	190.4	189.8	186.4	185.5	157.5	151.0	2,299.1
Percentage possible sunshine	49	51	56	59	60	52	43	46	51	54	52	51	52
Source: China Meteorological Administration

== Demographics ==
According to the seventh census, as of 00:00 on November 1, 2020, the resident population of Zibo was 4,704,138 people, of which 2,102,819 were male and 2,078,441 were female. The sex male to female ratio was 101.17, death rate was 5.92%, and birth rate was 8.81%. The natural growth rate of the population that year was 2.90%. The area had a population density of 704.15 per square kilometer.

The fourth nationwide census showed that over 99 percent of the total population are Han Chinese. In addition, there are 44 minority nationalities, including Hui, Manchus, Mongols and Koreans. Mongols and Manchus are the only two minority groups that have more than 1,000 people. The town of Jinling Hui, which is located at the junction of Zhangdian and Linzi, in one of only four towns named by an ethnic minority in Shandong Province.

In 2008, the per capita disposable income of urban residents was 17,629 yuan, up by 11.2% from the year before; the per capita disposable income of rural residents was 7,364 yuan, up by 13.9%. The Engel's coefficients, which reflect the consumption structure and level of China's urban and rural residents, were 32.1% and 35.6%, respectively.

== Culture ==
=== Dialect ===
The Zibo dialect has classical features of Northern Chinese but also has specific characteristics of its own. In Zibo dialect, points of articulation of low vowel is particularly deep in the mouth, and most areas do not have a retroflex consonant except in parts of Linzi District. The Zibo dialect does not have many features that distinguish it from mandarin when it comes to sentence composition, while subtle differences may be found when people ask questions and their expressions to probability of actions. The Zibo dialect may be divided into three major sections according to the administrative districts: Huantai-Zhangdian-Zhoucun, being areas on the transport corridor between Jinan and Weifeng, have a mild mandarin accent closely resembling somewhere between Beijing, Jinan, Qingdao and Zichuan accents. Boshan has its own accent which is derived from the traditional center of the Zibo prefecture. Lastly, the Zichuan district has its own distinct accent with many colloquialisms.

=== Cuisine ===
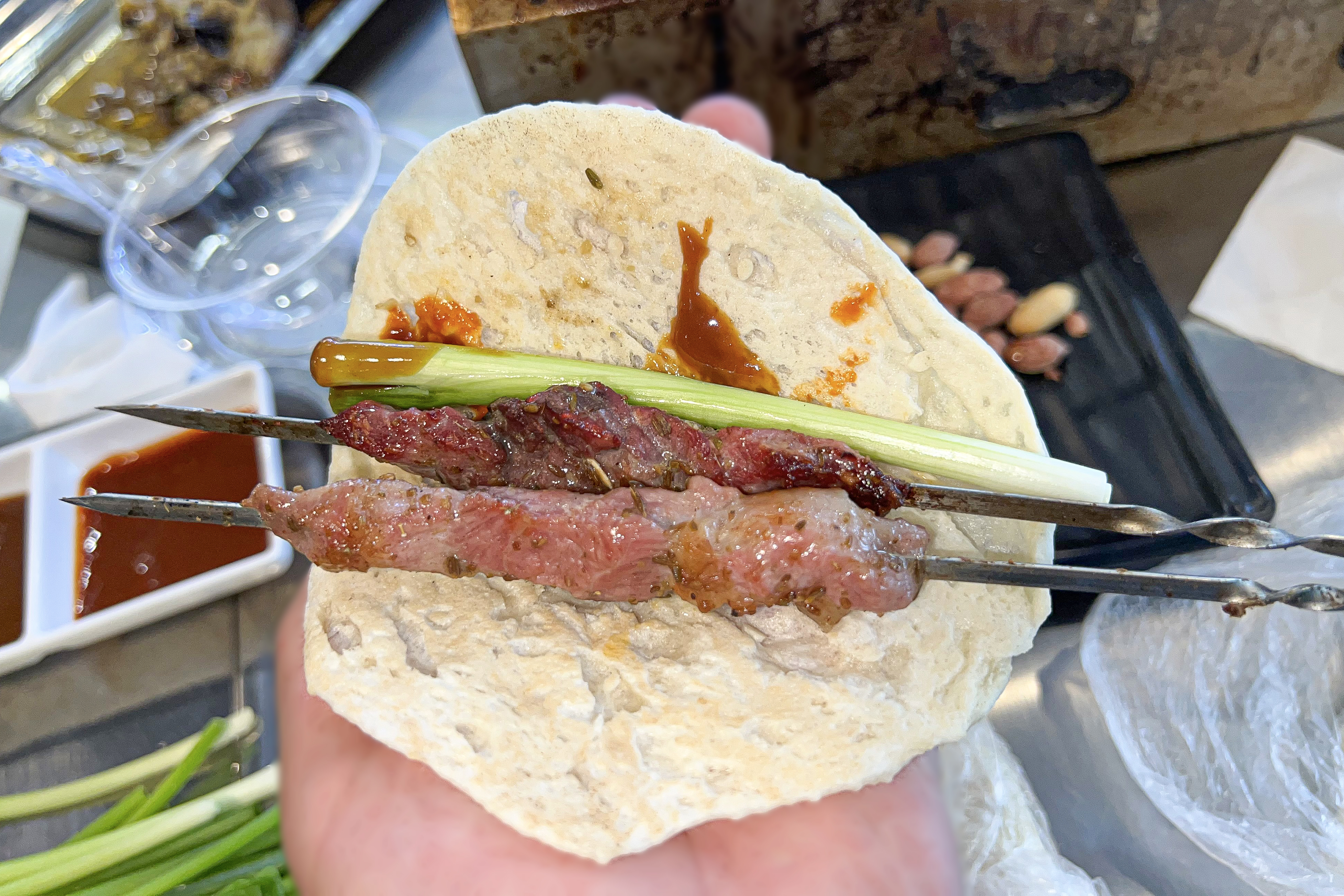
Zibo-style barbecue

Traditional Zibo cuisine is part of Shandong cuisine although Zibo cuisine is, in fact, not a real branch of the Lu Cuisine (Shandong cuisine), whilst Boshan Cuisine is. Boshan cuisine restaurants can only be found in Zibo, and nearby places. Featured local snacks, include Zhou Cun Pancake, Shi Ha Ma Dumpling, Vegetable Pancake, Sauced Mutton, pork feet stew with kelp lotus root and Chinese cabbage, pork intestine hotpot with fried beancurd, and Bean-curd Case (fried bean-curd stuffed with vegetables and meat).

In early 2023 Zibo's outdoor BBQ restaurants went viral on social media, attracting millions of visitors.

=== Traditional drama ===
The "Five-Voiced Drama" is a unique kind of local drama that originated in central Shandong and was once popular among the folks here. This form of art got its name because the show is often performed by 4-5 people, and the performance is featured by gorgeous singing tunes and vivid lyrics. The straight performance and the local style also help it to be distinguished from other Chinese dramas. The plays that are acknowledged to many people include Wang Xiao Gan Jiao (Salesboy), Wang Erjie Si Fu (Lonely lady) and so on. Zibo Five-voiced Drama Troupe is the only theatrical troupe all around the country that professionally perform this drama. By far, Five-Voiced Drama has been listed as a "National Intangible Cultural Heritage".

=== Artware ===
Boshan colored glaze is a traditional craft originating in Shandong Province. The production of colored glaze in Boshan has a long history. During the Hongwu era of the Ming dynasty, imperial officials established the "Out Factory" to produce colored-glass items for the imperial family, including blue and green curtains. By the end of the Ming dynasty, the production of colored glaze for the general public had also expanded. During the Jingtai era, four large kilns on Xiyejie Street produced enamel materials. Around the Jiajing era, Boshan craftsmen produced colored-glass items such as pearl-glazed ornaments, bed curtains, and mosquito-net hooks, contributing to the development of the local colored-glass industry. In 1617 (the 46th year of the Wanli era), a group led by Sun Yanshou initiated the establishment of a colored-glass guild, the first such organization in Yanshan Town. Colored-glass products were sold locally and transported to Beijing and southern China for distribution.

=== Honors earned ===
- National Hygienic City (2006)--- National Patriotic (Public) Health Campaign Commission of P.R. China
- National Garden City (2005)---Ministry of Construction of P.R. China
- Best Tourism City in China (2001)---National Tourism Administration of P.R. China
- Historical and Cultural City (1994)---State Council of P.R. China

=== Tourism ===
Zibo enjoys abundant historical and cultural sites of interest. The Linzi Museum of Ancient Chariots, the Museum of the History of the State of Qi, the Zibo City Museum, the Zibo Museum of Ceramics, the Zhoucun Ancient Commercial Town, and the Thousand Buddha Temple in Zhoucun are the most recommendable places for tourists who want to learn about Zibo's long history and about the Qi Culture. Yuanshan National Forest Park, situated southwest of Baoshan District in Zibo, is a spot worth visiting. It consists of the Great Wall of the Qi State, the grass skiing field, Dinosaur Valley and a folk garden. The Great Wall of Qi was built by the Qi State during the Spring-and-Autumn and Warring States Periods over 2,500 years ago.

In 2023, Zibo became a popular tourist destination during the May Day holiday for its barbecue, which had gained popularity on the internet. A study of travel vlogs found that Zibo was portrayed as an affordable, hospitable, and tranquil tourist destination.

== Economy ==
The Silk Road, prosperous from the Han to the Tang dynasty, is famous for economic and cultural exchanges between the East and the West. The Shandong area, particularly Zibo, was a major center of silk supply. At present, Zibo remains an important a producer of silk and light textile products in China. The city's products enjoy a great reputation at home and abroad.

More than 50 types of mineral reserves have been found in the city. Zibo is a main source of coal, iron, bauxite, coal clay, chemical limestone, pottery clay, etc. in Shandong because of their large reserves, high quality, and wide distribution. Northern Zibo is also rich in petroleum and natural gas. The city initially developed as a mining city, and is currently undergoing technological upgradation and industrial transformation.

Since 2002, the city has been steadily taking measures to improve the environment. Small, polluting coal mines and chemical factories were closed, while all major plants were required to install sewage disposal to get control the emission of air and soil pollutants. Currently, Zibo has three municipal sewage treatment plants that comply with China's Grade-A1 Integrated wastewater discharge standard (GB 8978–1996).

In 2008, the total industrial output of Zibo reached 532 billion RMB. In the same year, its GDP was 231.7 billion yuan RMB, ranking just below Qingdao, Yantai, Jinan and Weifang within the province. The percentages of GDP in the agriculture, industry and service sectors were 3.5%, 64.8%, 31.7%, respectively.

In 2017, Zibo's GDP reached 478.13 billion yuan RMB, ranking just below Qingdao, Yantai, Jinan and Weifang within the province. The percentages of GDP in the agriculture, industry and service sectors were 3.1%, 52.1%, 44.8%, respectively.

In 2023, Zibo's successful policy of encouraging street food vendors became a role model for such cities as Beijing, Moscow, Ottawa and Shenzhen.

== Transportation ==
An important traffic hub of Shandong province, Zibo enjoys convenient transportation. The Jiaoji Railway, Zhangbo Railway, Zidong Railway and Xintai Railway intersect in Zibo. Jiqing Expressway and Binlai Expressway pass through the city, connecting every county and district. The center of Zibo is only 70 km (43 mi) away from the Jinan Yaoqiang International Airport, 210 km (130 mi) away from the Qingdao Liuting International Airport and 260 km (160 mi) away from the Qingdao Seaport.

=== Railway ===
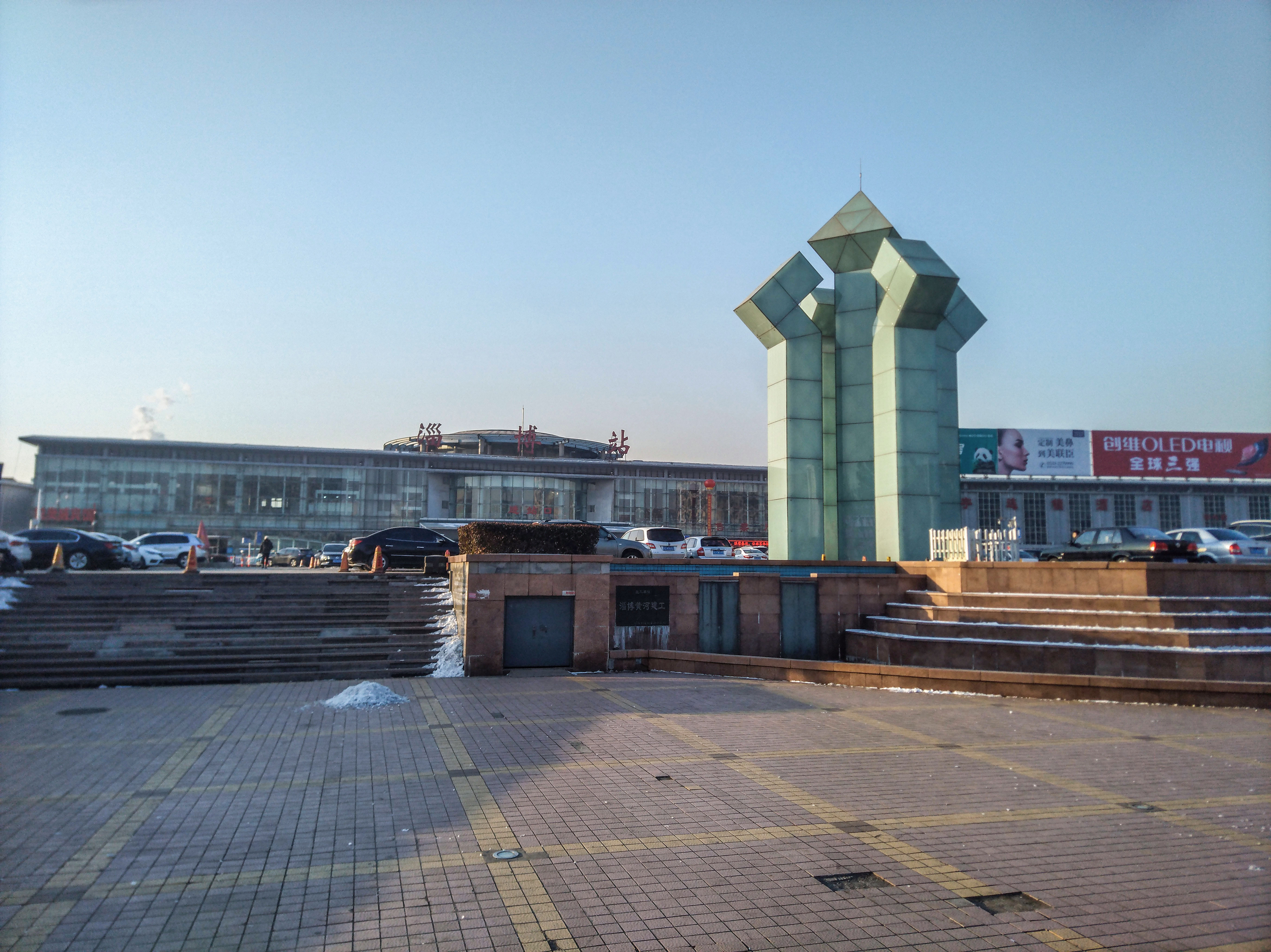
Zibo Railway Station

37 railway stations in large and small sizes are in service nowadays. Zibo Railway Station, lying on the Jiaozhou–Jinan and Zibo–Dongying Railways, is among the busiest railway stations in Shandong province. As of 1 July 2009, Zibo Railway Station has 103 trains stopping daily. If you catch a multiple unit train at Zibo Railway Station, it will only take you 1 hour to Jinan, 2 hours to Qingdao and 4 hours to Beijing.

=== Freeways and highways ===
- Jiqing Expressway runs west from Jinan through Zibo to Qingdao.
- Binlai Expressway begins from Binzhou. It intersects Jiqing Expressway northwest of downtown Zhangdian and runs south to Laiwu.
- National Highway 309 starts at Rongcheng within Shandong and ends in Lanzhou, Gansu Province, routing through six provinces. It has a total length of 2,208 kilometers.
- National Highway 205 starts at Shanhaiguan, Hebei province and has a terminal at Shenzhen, which has a length of 3160 kilometers. It passes through eight provinces.

=== Mass transit ===
Mass transit in the region is provided by bus services. More than 2,500 large and medium-sized diesel buses, CNG buses are serving over 250 routes. With a "Qikatong" card traveling by bus in the downtown area, passengers could get a discount of 10% to 40%. Now Zibo is undergoing restructuring of its public transit system, aiming at intensive management of higher efficiency and more professional service. Full-electric buses and taxis are now incorporated into daily operations.

== Education ==
Zibo is a national "advanced city invigorating itself through science and technology", "cultural model city" and "technology-intensive area". Within the city's boundaries, 443,000 (data of 2008) students from Grade 1 to Grade 9 are taught in 379 primary schools and 169 middle schools respectively under the compulsory education system, which belongs to a bigger education system of the nation. School districts are divided according to both neighborhoods and administrative districts. The number of high schools is 42, among which is the Shandong Zibo Experimental High School.

There are 14 institutions of higher education. Among them the Shandong University of Technology and Wanjie Medical College are able to offer the bachelor's degree, the rest being vocational universities. There are also postgraduate education and PhD programs in Shandong University of Technology. The education system of Zibo offers more than 30 key majors, including mechanics, electronics and informatics, biological pharmacological science, textile and clothes and logistics, and can provide local enterprises with 30,000 specialized technical personnel every year.

== Sister cities ==
- Erie, Pennsylvania, United States
- Arequipa, Peru
- Kamo, Japan
- Novgorod, Russia
- (Georgia (country)) Batumi, Georgia
- Mandaue, Philippines
- Gwangju, South Korea
- Bratsk, Russia
- Bournemouth, England, United Kingdom
- São José dos Pinhais, Brazil
- La Roche-sur-Yon, France
