= Zhoucun, Zibo =

Zhoucun District 周村区
- District
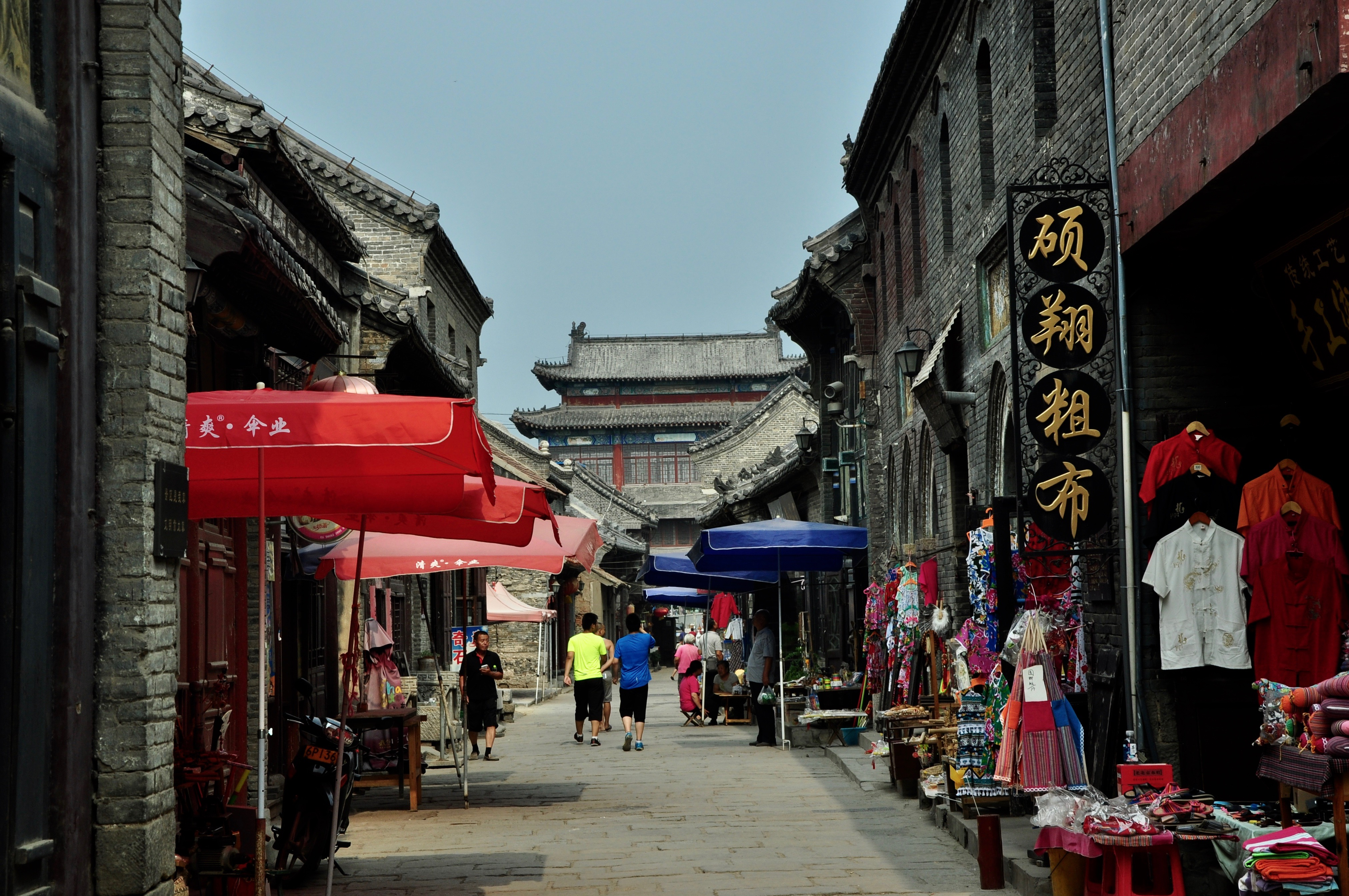
- Zhoucun ancient town

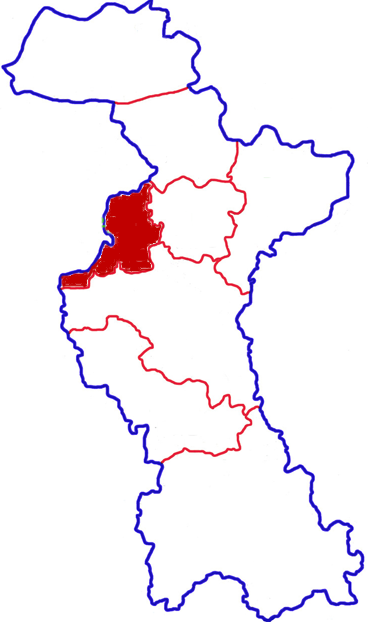
- Location in Zibo

- Location in Shandong
- Coordinates: 36°48′14″N 117°52′05″E
- Country: People's Republic of China
- Province: Shandong
- Prefecture-level city: Zibo

Area
  - Total: 307 km^{2} (119 sq mi)

Population (2018)
  - Total: 287,494
  - Density: 936/km^{2} (2,430/sq mi)
- Time zone: UTC+8 (China Standard)
- Postal code: 255300
- Area code: +86 0533

Zhoucun district (Chinese: 周村区; pinyin: Zhōucūn Qū) is a district in Zibo, Shandong Province, China. The district covers 307 km^{2} (119 sq mi) and had an estimated population of 288,440 in 2013. Its main industry is textiles and furniture manufacture. The center of the commercial district has a recently refurbished area with traditional buildings. Some of the filming for Zhang Yimou's film To Live was done in the district.

== Historical anecdote ==
In the 17th century, the textile industry was flourishing in Zhoucun, while the local government was corrupted to a point that it set up a department called "二公衙门" for extorting money. The department hired parasitic scumbags to levy various high taxes. It was not long before the merchants disappointed and began to leave.

Meanwhile, the Ministry of Justice of the Qing Government, Huahsi Lee, came back to Zhoucun to see his family. He was outraged by the state of the economy of his hometown, and reported to Emperor Shunzhi. It would have been embarrassing for Shunzhi not to show his mercy, but inadequate to take ease on his taxes. He compromised: Zhoucun shall take only one day off the tax.

This kind of stingy "mercy" was really some gigantic excrement drained upon Huahsi's head, but he thought of a way around it. Huahsi gave orders to build a monument with "今日无税" ("No Tax Today") carvings ambiguously under the command of the emperor, so merchants are able to do business tax-free all the time.

Later on Huahsi felt guilty about tax evasion and undertook the taxes himself. Huahsi even promised that whoever got robbed within 200 Li(about 115 km) around Zhoucun shall get reparation from his family. Such act maintained for seven generations, about 200 years.

The economically preposterous and doubtful monument is still at the center of the relics called "周村大街", but it was long invalid.

== Administrative divisions ==
Zhoucun district is divided to 5 subdistricts and 4 towns.

Subdistricts

- Sichoulu Subdistrict (丝绸路街道)
- Dajie Subdistrict (大街街道)
- Qingnianlu Subdistrict (青年路街道)
- Yong'an Subdistrict (永安街道)
- Chengbeilu Subdistrict (城北路街道)

Towns

- Beijiao (北郊镇)
- Nanjiao (南郊镇)
- Wangcun (王村镇)
- Mengshui (萌水镇)

== Climate ==
Climate data for Zhoucun, elevation 45 m (148 ft), (1991–2020 normals, extremes 1981–present)
Month	Jan	Feb	Mar	Apr	May	Jun	Jul	Aug	Sep	Oct	Nov	Dec	Year
Record high °C (°F)	20.4 (68.7)	22.3 (72.1)	31.4 (88.5)	35.3 (95.5)	40.0 (104.0)	41.8 (107.2)	40.9 (105.6)	38.2 (100.8)	40.1 (104.2)	32.3 (90.1)	27.1 (80.8)	22.0 (71.6)	41.8 (107.2)
Mean daily maximum °C (°F)	4.0 (39.2)	7.9 (46.2)	15.1 (59.2)	21.4 (70.5)	27.6 (81.7)	31.8 (89.2)	32.2 (90.0)	30.7 (87.3)	27.2 (81.0)	21.6 (70.9)	13.1 (55.6)	5.9 (42.6)	19.9 (67.8)
Daily mean °C (°F)	−1.7 (28.9)	1.7 (35.1)	8.6 (47.5)	14.9 (58.8)	21.4 (70.5)	25.9 (78.6)	27.2 (81.0)	25.6 (78.1)	21.1 (70.0)	15.2 (59.4)	7.2 (45.0)	0.2 (32.4)	13.9 (57.1)
Mean daily minimum °C (°F)	−6.4 (20.5)	−3.2 (26.2)	2.4 (36.3)	8.5 (47.3)	15.0 (59.0)	20.2 (68.4)	22.7 (72.9)	21.5 (70.7)	16.0 (60.8)	9.7 (49.5)	2.2 (36.0)	−4.4 (24.1)	8.7 (47.6)
Record low °C (°F)	−19.7 (−3.5)	−14.5 (5.9)	−8.7 (16.3)	−3.3 (26.1)	2.4 (36.3)	10.2 (50.4)	15.6 (60.1)	11.1 (52.0)	6.3 (43.3)	−2.7 (27.1)	−12.1 (10.2)	−18.7 (−1.7)	−19.7 (−3.5)
Average precipitation mm (inches)	6.9 (0.27)	12.2 (0.48)	11.0 (0.43)	30.1 (1.19)	60.6 (2.39)	80.6 (3.17)	158.0 (6.22)	172.6 (6.80)	61.4 (2.42)	27.1 (1.07)	27.3 (1.07)	8.9 (0.35)	656.7 (25.86)
Average precipitation days (≥ 0.1 mm)	2.6	3.6	3.7	5.6	7.0	8.0	12.2	12.1	7.3	5.9	4.7	3.7	76.4
Average snowy days	3.9	3.6	1.5	0.2	0	0	0	0	0	0	0.8	2.4	12.4
Average relative humidity (%)	58	55	48	52	56	59	75	80	73	65	64	60	62
Mean monthly sunshine hours	146.4	156.8	214.4	230.6	260.6	217.5	177.8	184.5	177.6	184.5	160.3	155.7	2,266.7
Percentage possible sunshine	47	51	58	58	59	50	40	44	48	54	53	52	51
Source: China Meteorological Administrationall-time August high
