= List of sites in Jinan =

Significant places in Jinan, Shandong, China

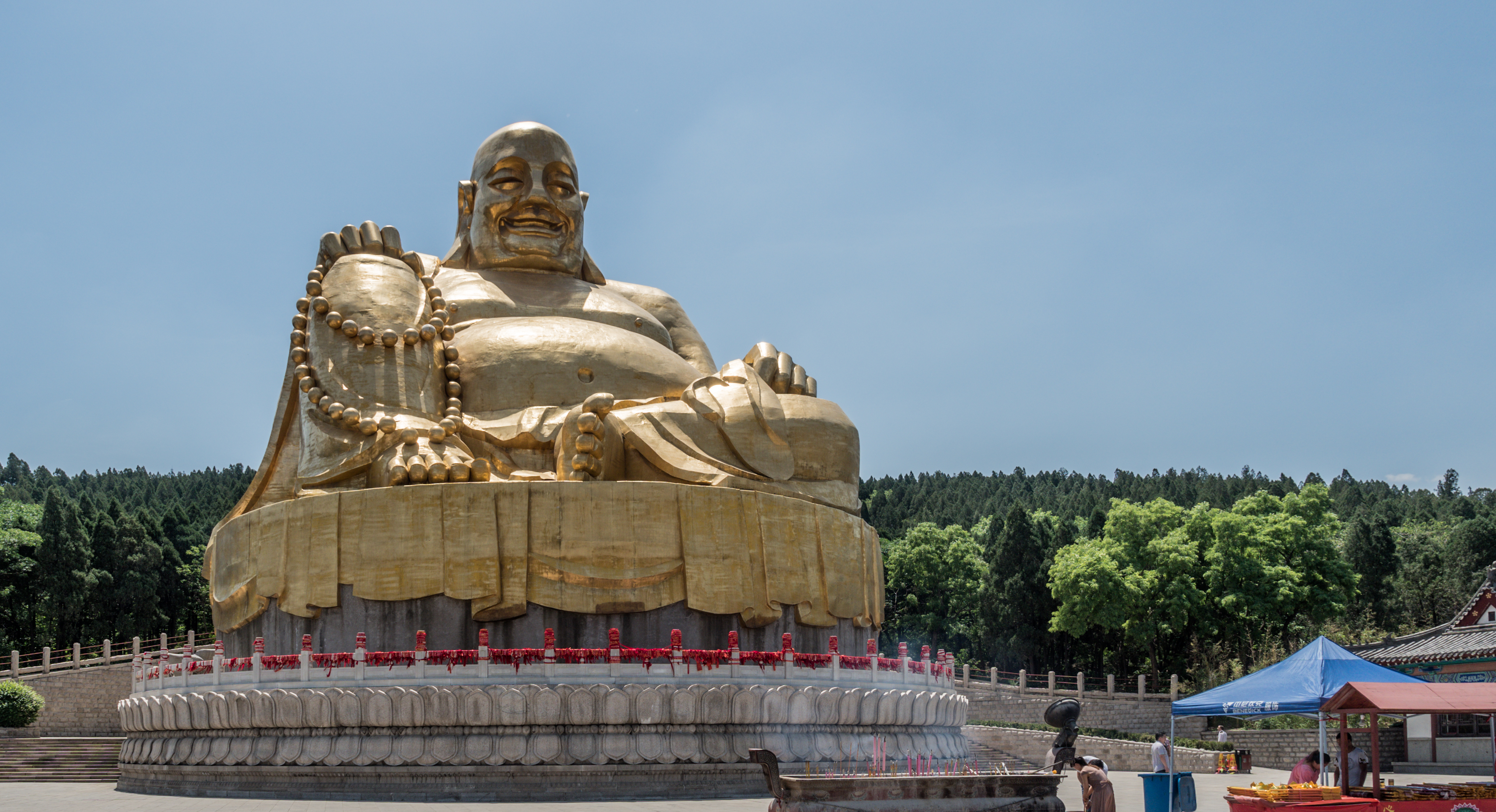
The Maitreya Statue in Thousand Buddha Mountain

The following is a list of sites in Jinan. It contains sites of natural, cultural, economic, political, or historical significance in the City of Jinan, Shandong, China. The geographical area covered by this list includes all counties and districts that are under the administration of Jinan City.

== Springs ==
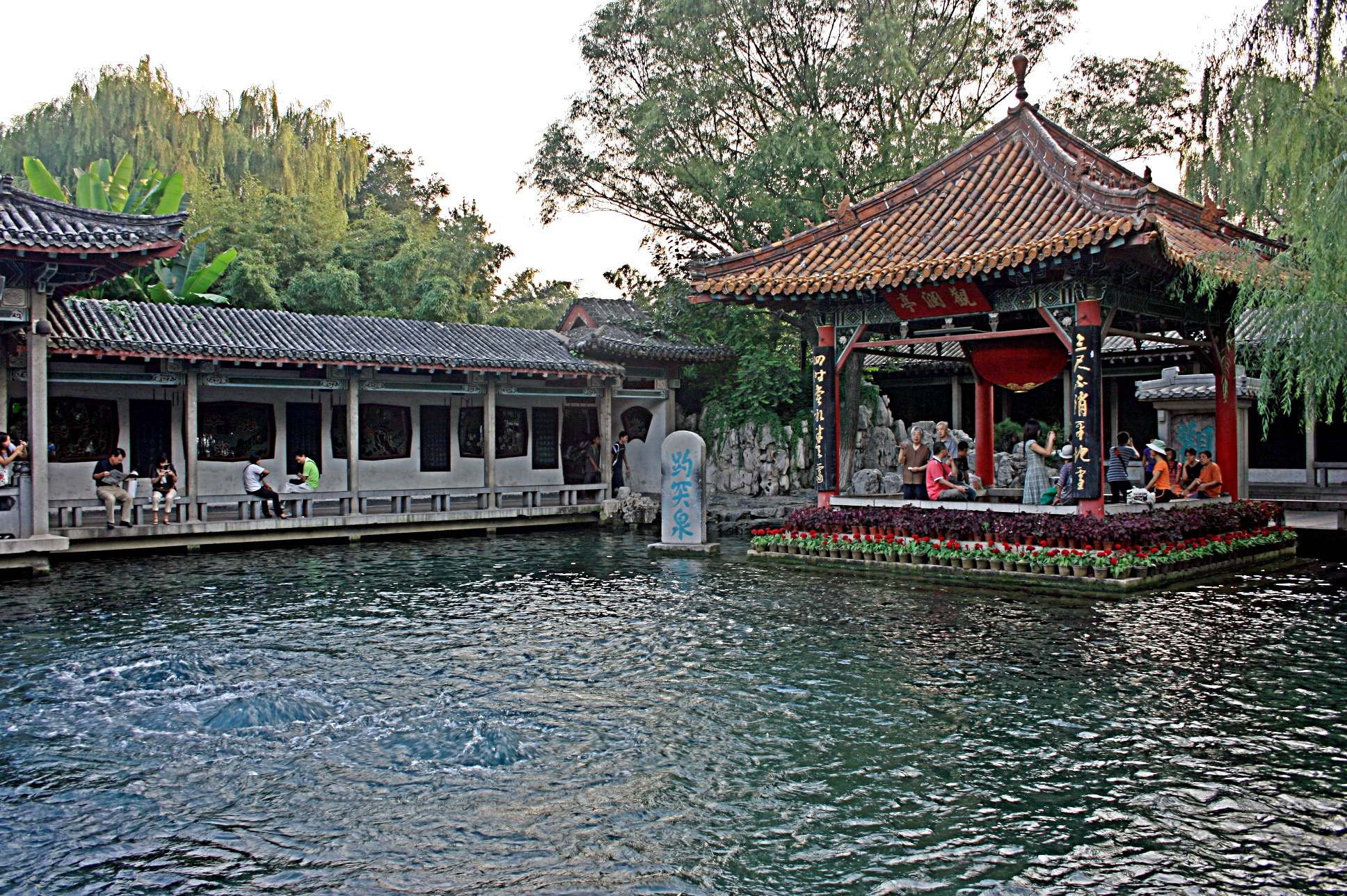
Baotu Spring

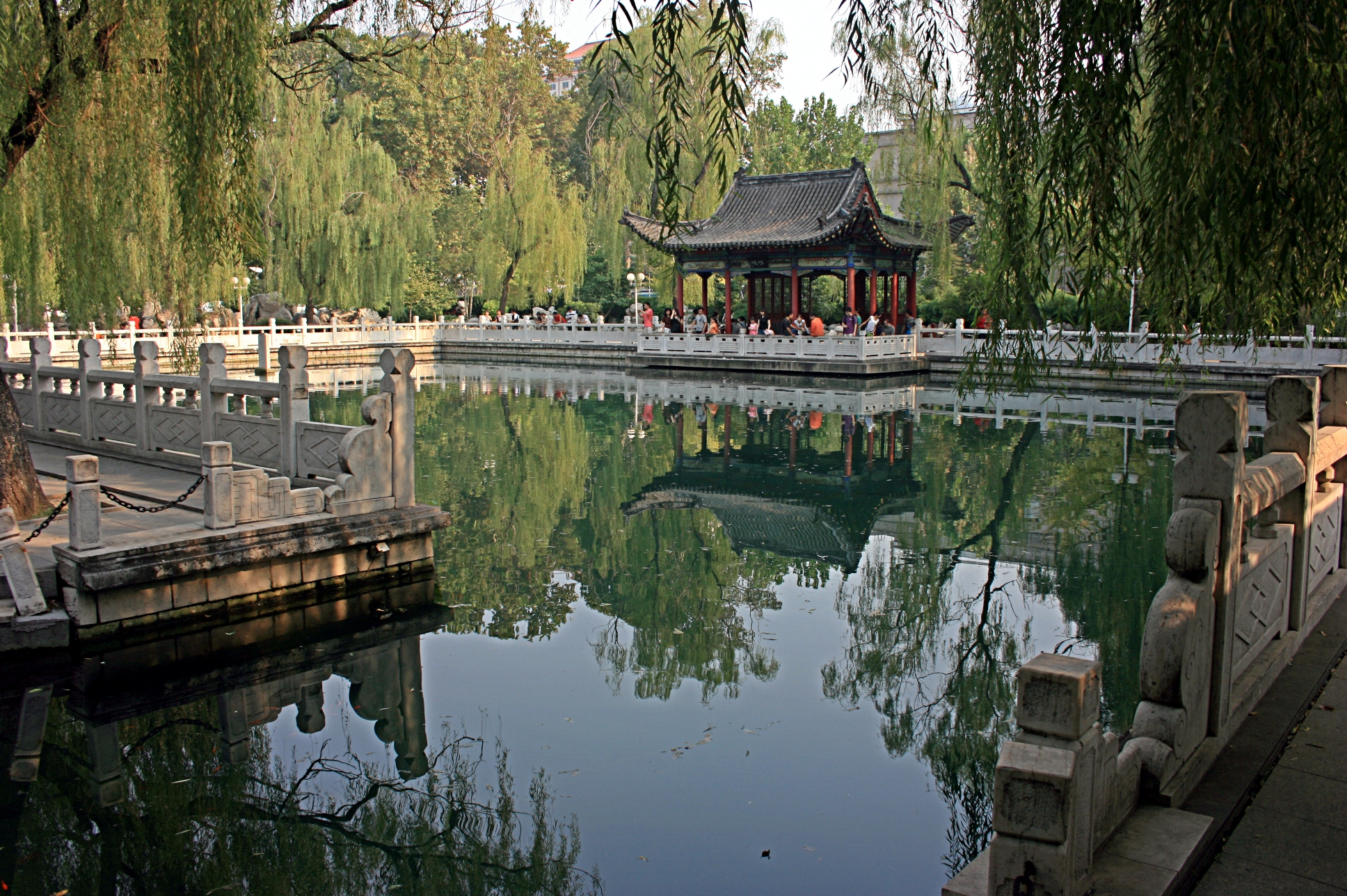
Pearl Spring

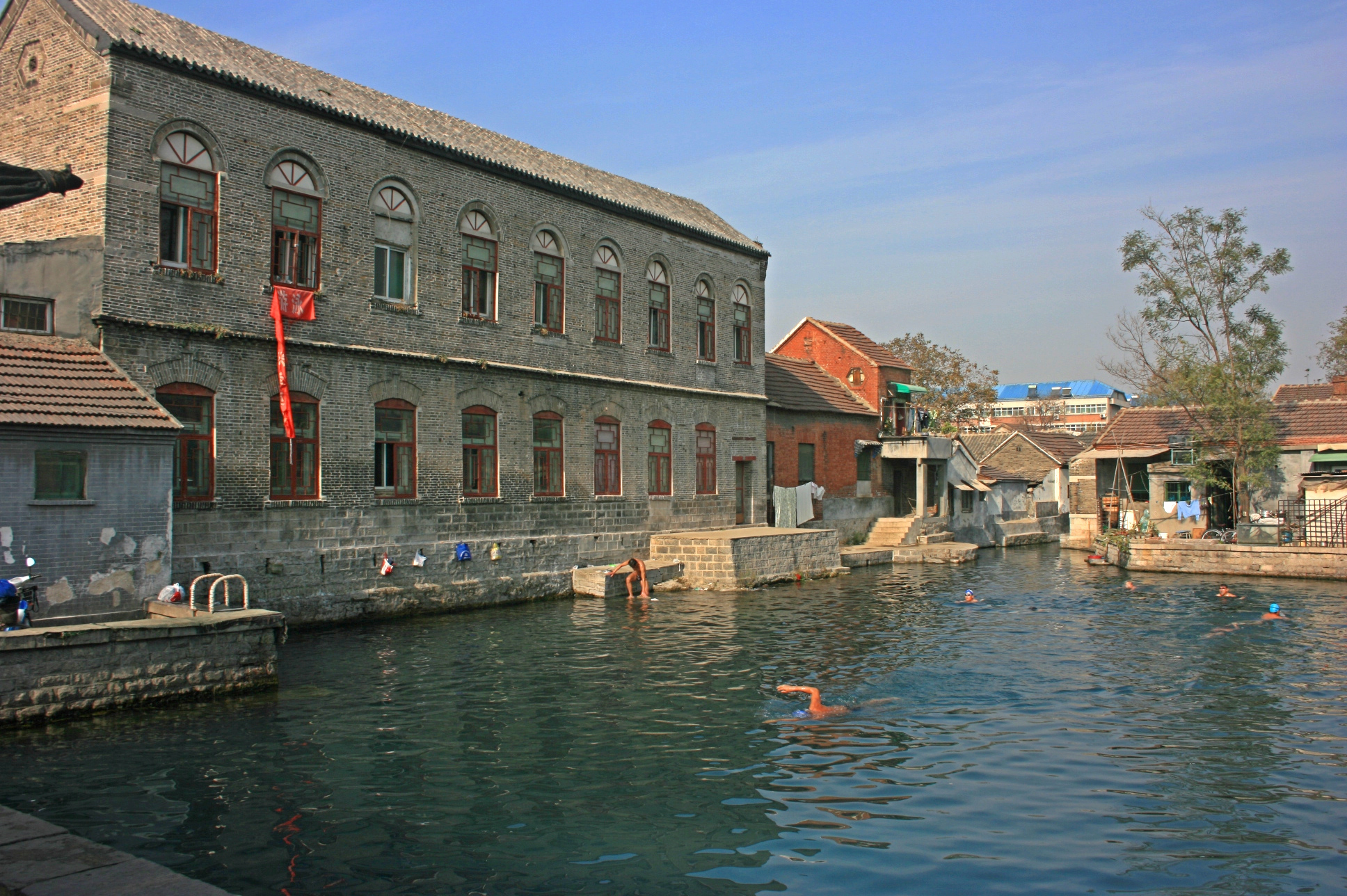
Zhuoying Spring

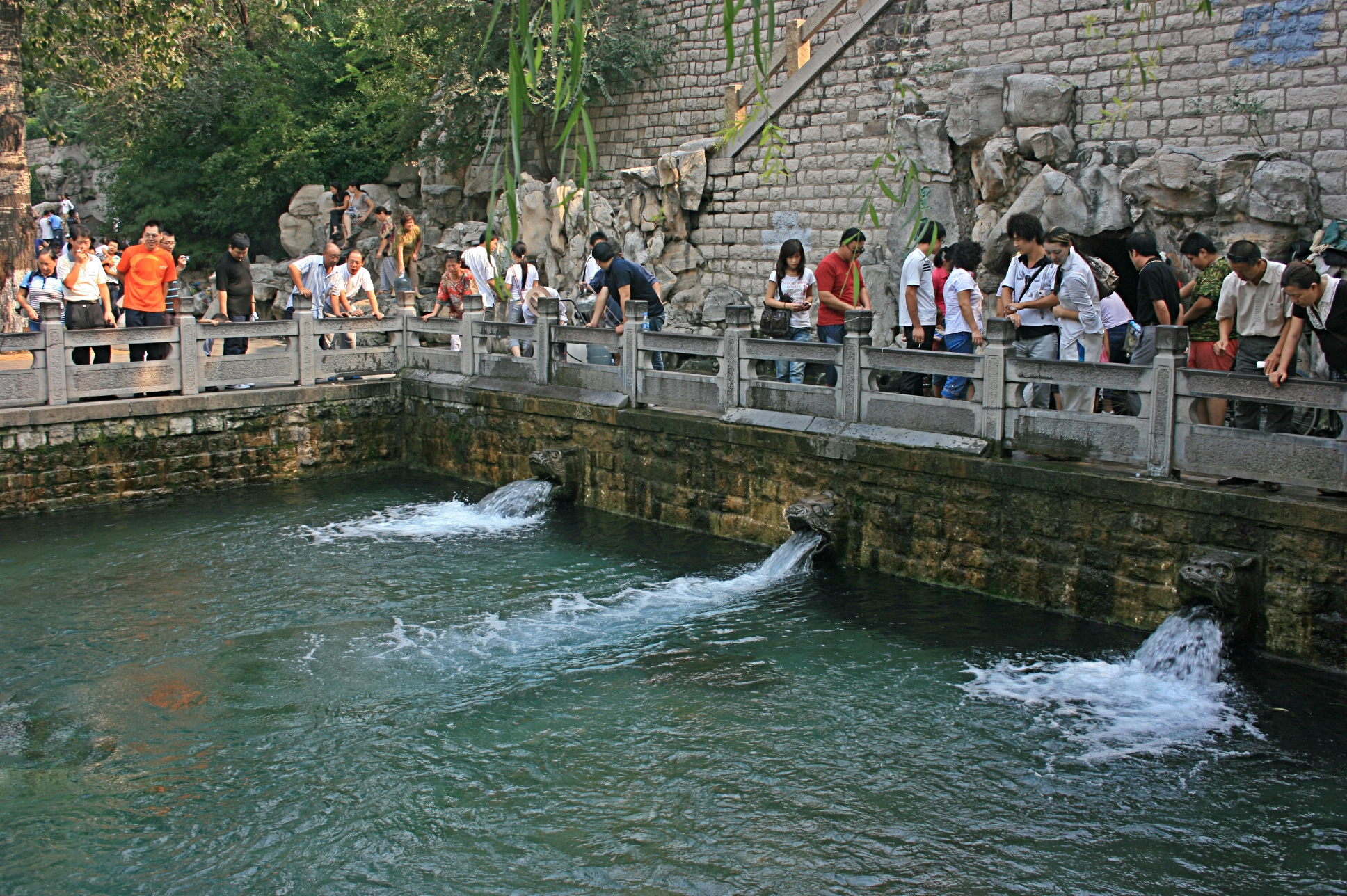
Black Tiger Spring

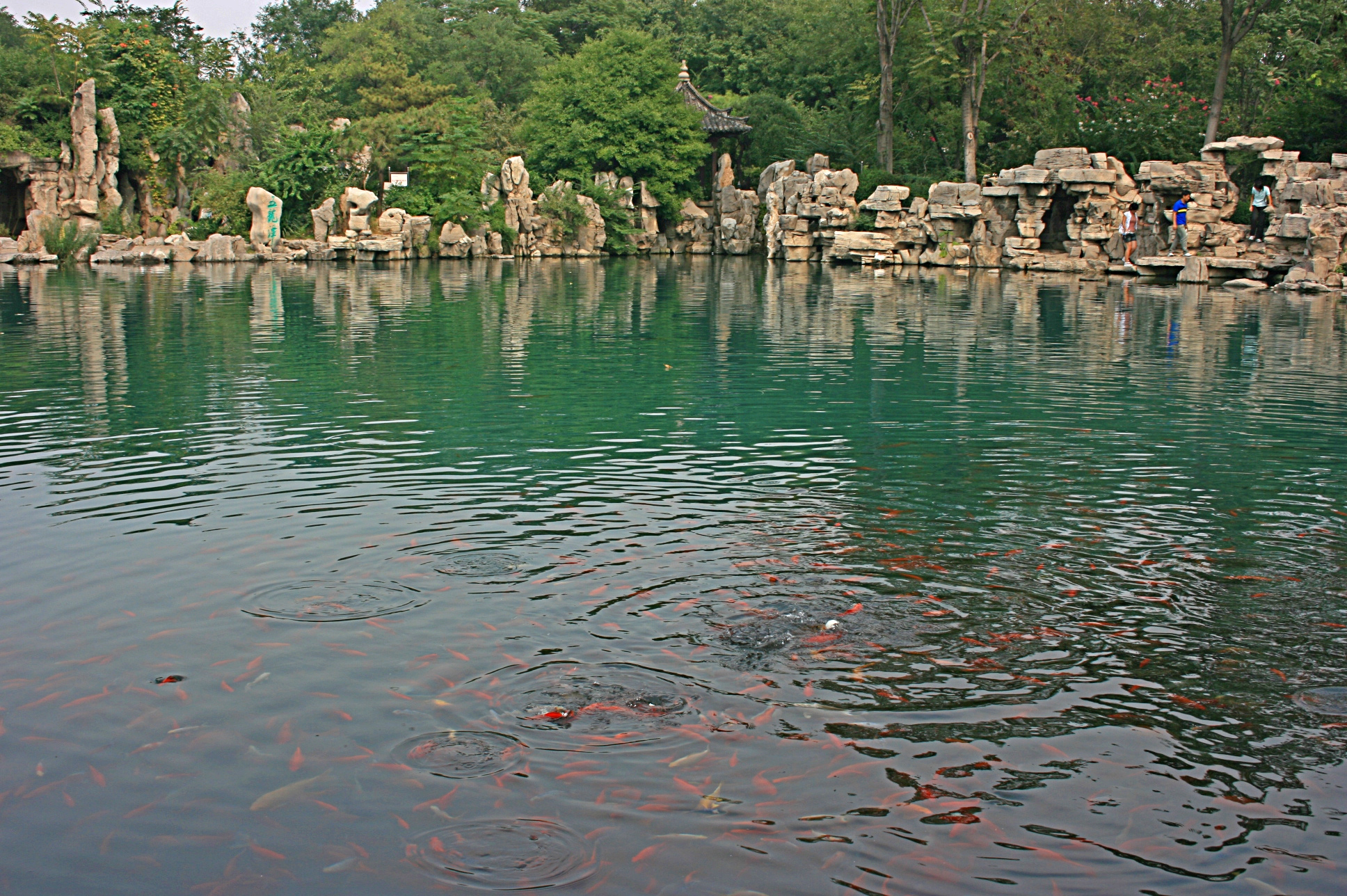
Five Dragon Pool

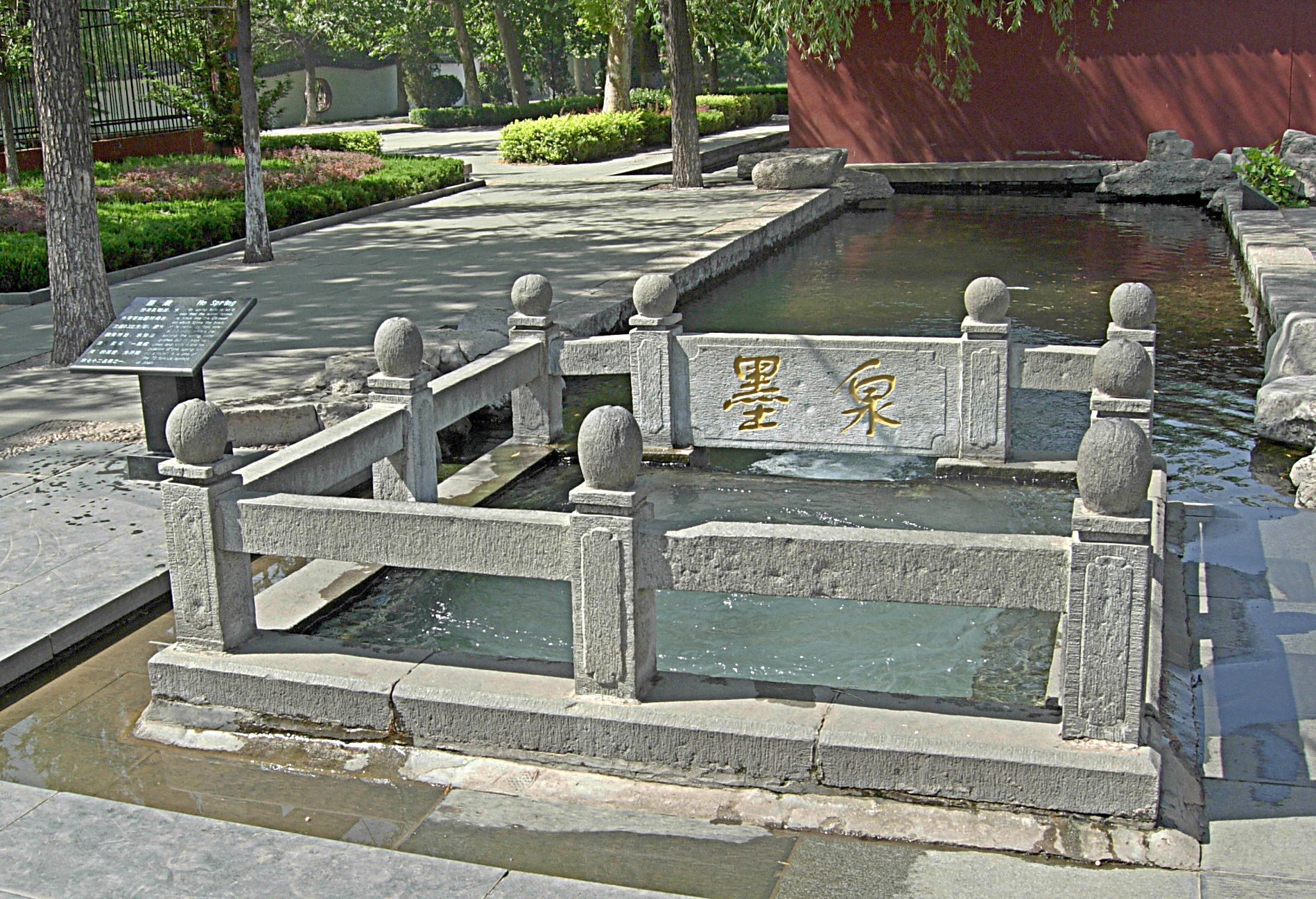
Mo Spring (Baimai Springs)

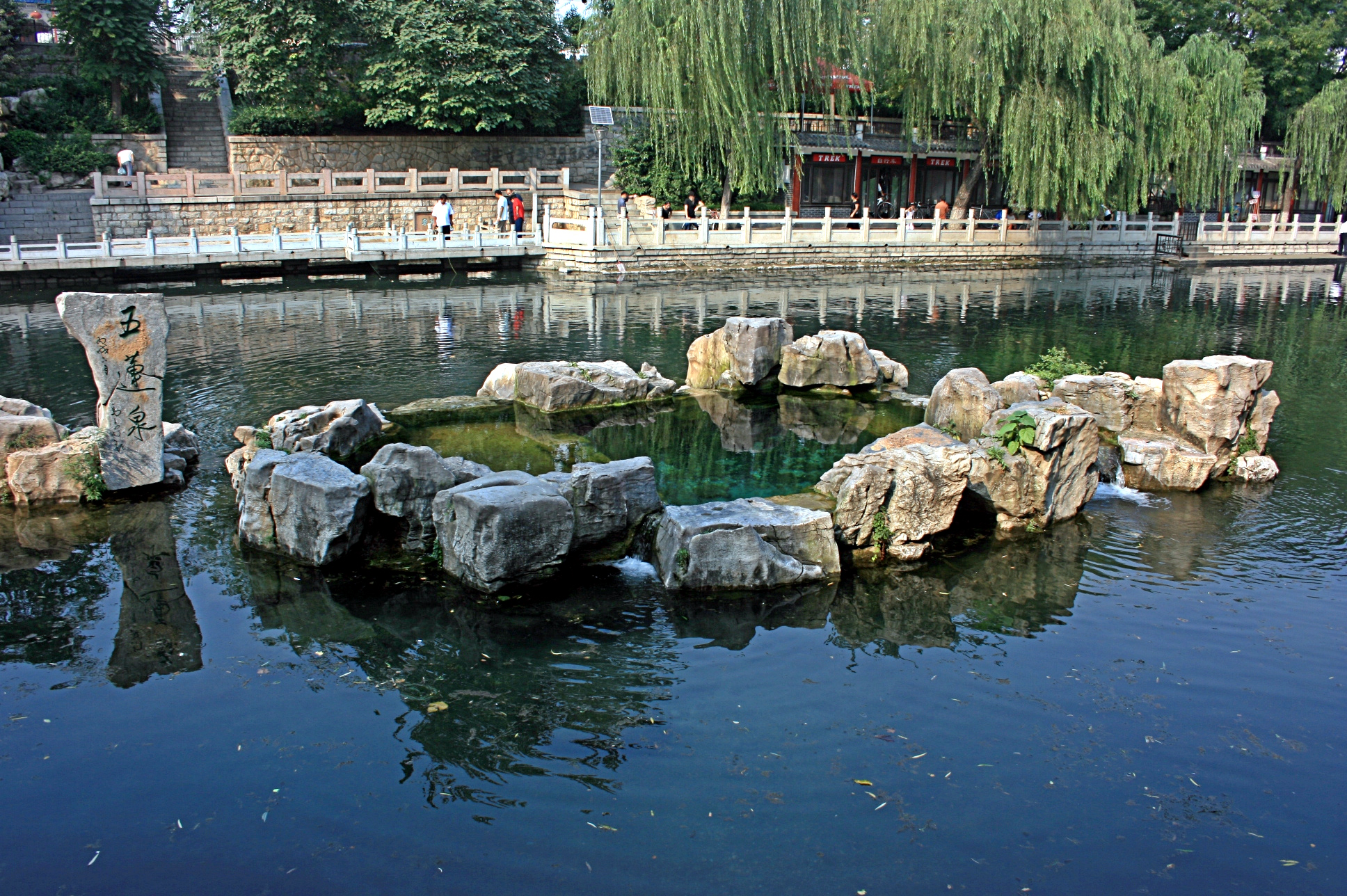
Five Lotus Spring

The most renowned springs in Jinan are included in the list of the "seventy-two famous springs" (Chinese: 七十二名泉; pinyin: Qīshí'èr Míng Quán). This list has been kept and updated since the times of the Jin, Ming, and Qing dynasties. The following sites are on the current list (Chinese: 新七十二名泉; pinyin: Xīn Qīshí'èr Míng Quán) of the 72 famous springs:

1. Baotu Spring (Chinese: 趵突泉; pinyin: Bàotū Quán, also "Jet Spring" or "Spurting Spring", west of the city center, 36°39′38.52″N 117°0′33.84″E)
2. Jinxian Spring (Chinese: 金线泉; pinyin: Jīnxiàn Quán, in Baotu Spring Park)
3. Huanghua Spring (Chinese: 皇华泉; pinyin: Huánghuá Quán, in Baotu Spring Park)
4. Liuxu Spring (Chinese: 柳絮泉; pinyin: Liǔxù Quán, in Baotu Spring Park)
5. Woniu Spring (Chinese: 卧牛泉; pinyin: Wòniú Quán, literally "lying cattle spring", in Baotu Spring Park)
6. Shuyu Spring (Chinese: 漱玉泉; pinyin: Shùyù Quán, in Baotu Spring Park)
7. Mapao Spring (Chinese: 马跑泉; pinyin: Mǎpáo Quán, in Baotu Spring Park)
8. Wuyou Spring (Chinese: 无忧泉; pinyin: Wúyōu Quán, literally "carefree spring", in Baotu Spring Park)
9. Shiwan Spring (Chinese: 石湾泉; pinyin: Shíwān Quán, in Baotu Spring Park)
10. Zhanlu Spring (Chinese: 湛露泉; pinyin: Zhànlù Quán, in Baotu Spring Park)
11. Manjing Spring (Chinese: 满井泉; pinyin: Mǎnjǐng Quán, in Baotu Spring Park)
12. Dengzhou Spring (Chinese: 登州泉; pinyin: Dēngzhōu Quán, in Baotu Spring Park)
13. Dukang Spring (Chinese: 杜康泉; pinyin: Dùkāng Quán, in Baotu Spring Park)
14. Wangshui Spring (Chinese: 望水泉; pinyin: Wàngshuǐ Quán, in Baotu Spring Park)
15. Pearl Spring (Chinese: 珍珠泉; pinyin: Zhēnzhū Quán, namesake of a spring group, in the city center, 36°40′1.6″N 117°1′8″E)
16. Sanshui Spring (Chinese: 散水泉; pinyin: Sǎnshuǐ Quán, in Pearl Spring group)
17. Brook Pavilion Spring (Chinese: 溪亭泉; pinyin: Xītíng Quán, in Pearl Spring group)
18. Chu Spring (Chinese: 濋泉; pinyin: Chǔ Quán, in Pearl Spring group)
19. Zhuoying Spring (Chinese: 濯缨泉; pinyin: Zhuóyīng Quán, also known as the Palace Pool, Chinese: 王府池子; pinyin: Wángfǔ Chízǐ, 36°40′2.20″N 117°1′3.87″E)
20. Jade Ring Spring (Chinese: 玉环泉; pinyin: Yùhuán Quán, on Shengfuqian Street, in the historical city center)
21. Water Lily Spring (Chinese: 芙蓉泉; pinyin: Fúróng Quán, address: No. 69 Water Lily Street, Chinese: 芙蓉街; pinyin: Fúróng Jiē, in the historical city center)
22. Shunjing Spring (Chinese: 舜井泉; pinyin: Shùnjǐng Quán, on Shunjing Street)
23. Flying Dragon Spring (Chinese: 腾蛟泉; pinyin: Téngjiāo Quán, at northern end of Wangfu Chizi Road)
24. Double Loyalty Spring (Chinese: 双忠泉; pinyin: Shuāngzhōng Quán, on Shuangzhongci Street)
25. Black Tiger Spring (Chinese: 黑虎泉; pinyin: Hēi Hǔ Quán, on the south moat, 36°39′43.8″N 117°1′38″E)
26. Pipa Spring (Chinese: 琵琶泉; pinyin: Pípá Quán, next to the southern moat in Huancheng Park, 36°39′43.57″N 117°1′34.43″E)
27. Manao Spring (Chinese: 玛瑙泉; pinyin: Mǎnǎo Quán, south of Liberation Pavilion in Huancheng Park)
28. Hundred Rocks Spring (Chinese: 白石泉; pinyin: Báishí Quán, at the foot of Liberation Pavilion in Huancheng Park)
29. Nine Women Spring (Chinese: 九女泉; pinyin: Jiǔnǚ Quán, at the foot of the Liberation Pavilion in Huancheng Park)
30. Five Dragon Pool (Chinese: 五龙潭; pinyin: Wǔ Lóng Tán, namesake of a spring group, west of the city center, 36°39′54.36″N 117°0′30.96″E)
31. Gu Wen Spring (Chinese: 古温泉; pinyin: Gǔ Wēn Quán, in the Five Dragon Pool spring group)
32. Xianqing Spring (Chinese: 贤清泉; pinyin: Xiánqīng Quán, in the Five Dragon Pool spring group)
33. Tianjing Spring (Chinese: 天镜泉; pinyin: Tiānjìng Quán, in the Five Dragon Pool spring group)
34. Yueya Spring (Chinese: 月牙泉; pinyin: Yuèyá Quán, in the Five Dragon Pool spring group)
35. Ximizhi Spring (Chinese: 西蜜脂泉; pinyin: Xīmìzhī Quán, in the Five Dragon Pool spring group)
36. Guanjiachi Spring (Chinese: 官家泉; pinyin: Guānjiā Quán, in the Five Dragon Pool spring group)
37. Huima Spring (Chinese: 回马泉; pinyin: Huímǎ Quán, in the Five Dragon Pool spring group)
38. Qiuxi Spring (Chinese: 虬溪泉; pinyin: Qiúxī Quán, in the Five Dragon Pool spring group)
39. Jade Spring (Chinese: 玉泉; pinyin: Yù Quán, in the Five Dragon Pool spring group)
40. Lian Spring (Chinese: 濂泉; pinyin: Lián Quán, in the Five Dragon Pool spring group)
41. Hua Spring (Chinese: 华泉; pinyin: Huá Quán, on the foot of Hua Hill,36°43′28.02″N 117°3′51.37″E)
42. Jiangshui Spring (Chinese: 浆水泉; pinyin: Jiāngshuǐ Quán, in Jiangshui Spring Village)
43. Inkstone Spring (Chinese: 砚池泉; pinyin: Yànchí Quán, at the foot of Yanchi Mountain, Yaojia County)
44. Ganlu Spring (Chinese: 甘露泉; pinyin: Gānlù Quán; lit. 'Sweet Dew Spring', on the site of the Kaiyuan Temple, Fohui Mountain)
45. Linji Spring (Chinese: 林汲泉; pinyin: Línjí Quán, in the Dragon Cave area)
46. Doumu Spring (Chinese: 斗母泉; pinyin: Dòumǔ Quán, in Doumuquan Village)
47. Wuying Pool (Chinese: 无影潭; pinyin: Wúyǐng Tán, literally "Shadeless Pool", Wuyingshan Road, Tianqiao District)
48. Bai Spring (Chinese: 白泉; pinyin: Bái Quán, in Zhifang Village, Wangsheren County)
49. Yong Spring (Chinese: 涌泉; pinyin: Yǒng Quán, in Liubu National Forest Park)
50. Kuju Spring (Chinese: 苦苣泉; pinyin: Kǔjù Quán, in Yuanhong Valley, Liubu County)
51. Summer Vacation Spring (Chinese: 避暑泉; pinyin: Bìshǔ Quán, in Yuanhong Valley, Liubu County)
52. Tu Spring (Chinese: 突泉; pinyin: Tū Quán, in Tu Spring Village, Liubu County)
53. Niyu Spring (Chinese: 泥淤泉; pinyin: Níyū Quán, in Niyu Spring Village, Liubu County)
54. Great Spring (Chinese: 大泉; pinyin: Dà Quán, in Jinxiuchuan Village)
55. Sacred Water Spring (Chinese: 圣水泉; pinyin: Shèngshuǐ Quán, in the Red Leaves Valley)
56. Duanhua Spring (Chinese: 缎华泉; pinyin: Duànhuá Quán, in the "Jiuding Pagoda Park of Minority Customs")
57. Jade River Spring (Chinese: 玉河泉; pinyin: Yùhé Quán, formerly "Yuke Spring", in Yuhequan Village, Licheng District)
58. Baimai Spring (Chinese: 百脉泉; pinyin: Bǎimài Quán, namesake of a spring group, 36°43′1.73″N 117°31′57.96″E)
59. East Mawan Spring (Chinese: 东麻湾泉; pinyin: Dōngmáwān Quán, in Baimai Springs Park)
60. West Mawan Spring (Chinese: 西麻湾泉; pinyin: Xīmáwān Quán, on Huiquan Road, Zhangqiu City)
61. Mo Spring (Chinese: 墨泉; pinyin: Mò Quán, in Baimai Springs Park)
62. Plum Blossom Spring (Chinese: 梅花泉; pinyin: Méihuā Quán, in Baimai Springs Park)
63. Jingming Spring (Chinese: 净明泉; pinyin: Jìngmíng Quán, also called Mingshui Spring, in Zhangqiu City)
64. Cassock Spring (Chinese: 袈裟泉; pinyin: Jiāshā Quán, also called Dugu Spring, at the Lingyan Temple)
65. Zhuoxi Spring (Chinese: 卓锡泉; pinyin: Zhuóxī Quán, at the Lingyan Temple)
66. Qingling Spring (Chinese: 清泠泉; pinyin: Qīnglíng Quán, on Wufeng Mountain)
67. Tanbao Spring (Chinese: 檀抱泉; pinyin: Tánbào Quán, at the Lingyan Temple)
68. Xiaolu Spring (Chinese: 晓露泉; pinyin: Xiǎolù Quán, in Changqing District)
69. Hongfan Pond (Chinese: 洪范池; pinyin: Hóngfàn Chí, namesake of a spring group, in Pingyin County, 36°5′57.12″N 116°16′54.66″E)
70. Academy Spring (Chinese: 书院泉; pinyin: Shūyuàn Quán, also called "Dongliu Spring", Hongfan Pond Village, Pingyin County)
71. Hu Spring (Chinese: 扈泉; pinyin: Hù Quán, below th north cliff of Cuishan Mountain, Pingyin County)
72. Livelihood Spring (Chinese: 日月泉; pinyin: Rìyuè Quán, on Yuncui Mountain, Pingyin County)

Not included in the "Seventy-two famous springs":

- Five Lotus Spring (Chinese: 五莲泉; pinyin: Wǔ Lián Quán, on the south moat, 36°39′43.75″N 117°1′30.94″E)

== Hills ==
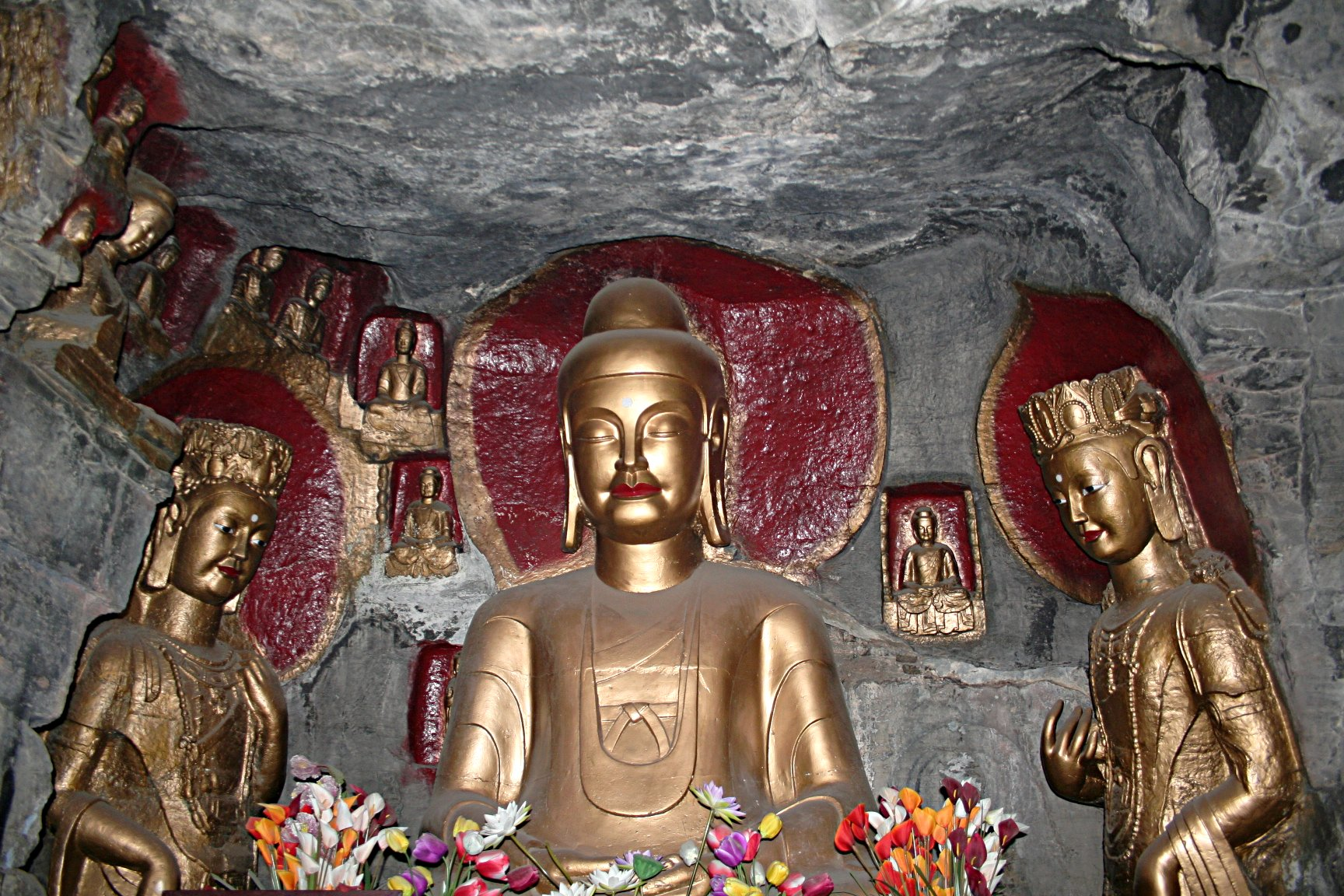
Buddha statues on the Thousand Buddha Mountain

- Bao Hill (Chinese: 鲍山; pinyin: Bào Shān)
- Five Peaks Mountain (Chinese: 五峰山; pinyin: Wǔ Fēng Shān)
- Heroes Hill (Chinese: 英雄山; pinyin: Yīngxióng Shān, 36°38′30.69″N 116°59′46.08″E)
- Thousand Buddha Mountain (Chinese: 千佛山; pinyin: Qiān Fó Shān, 36°38′43″N 117°01′37″E)
- Qinglong Hill (Chinese: 青龙山; pinyin: Qīnglóng Shān, 36°37′23.67″N 116°57′46.12″E)

=== Nine Solitary Hills ===
The "Nine Solitary Hills" (Chinese: 九座孤山; pinyin: Jiǔ Zuògū Shān) are a group of small solitary hills in the Yellow River valley within and to the north of Jinan City known for their scenic beauty:

- Hua Hill (Chinese: 华山; pinyin: Huá Shān, literally "Flower Hill", 36°43′42.96″N 117°3′49.86″E)

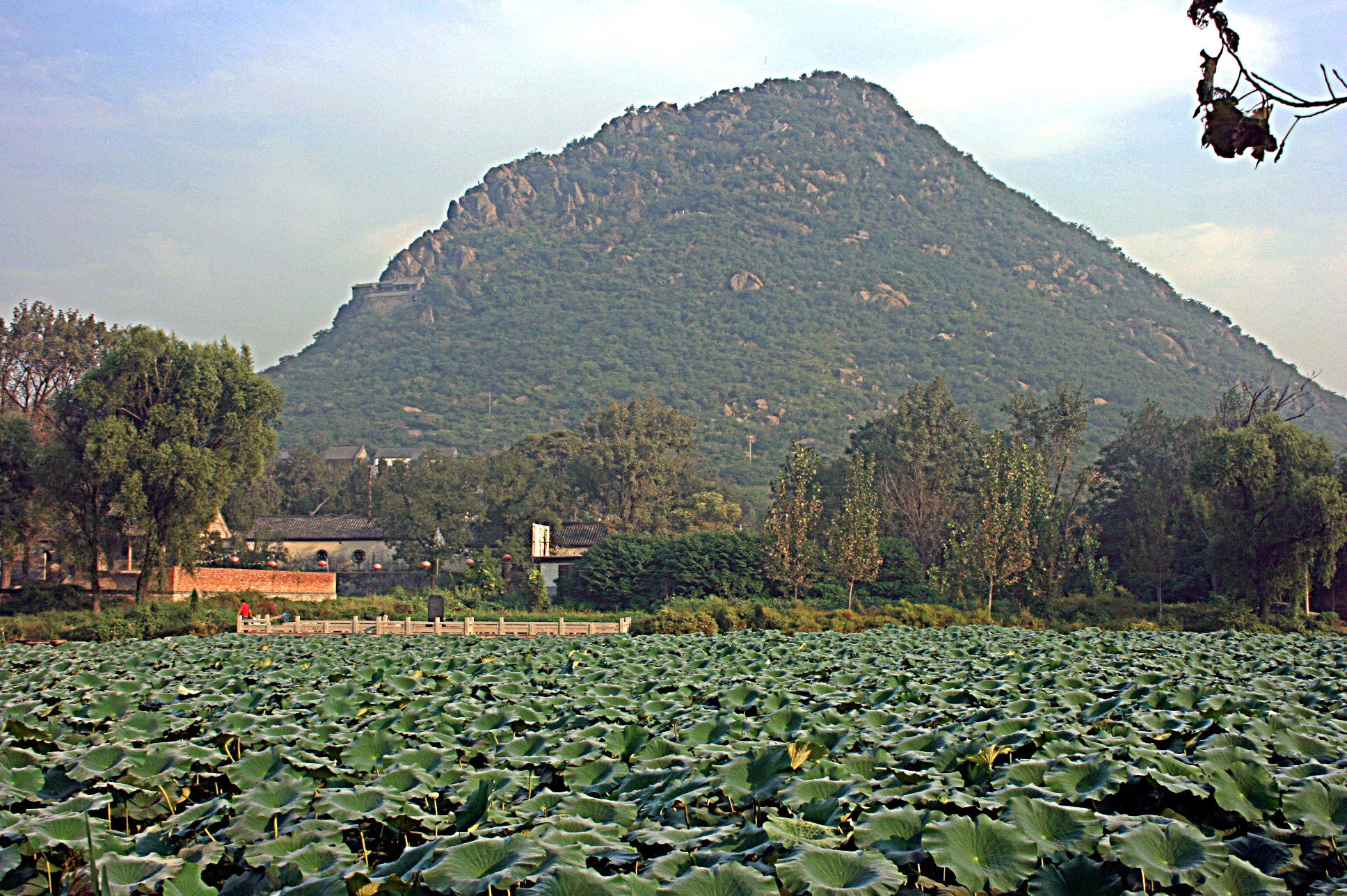
Hua Hill

- Woniu Hill (Chinese: 卧牛山; pinyin: Wòniú Shān, literally "Lying Cow Hill", 36°44′32.24″N 117°5′7.74″E)
- Que Hill (Chinese: 鹊山; pinyin: Què Shān, literally "Magpie Hill", 36°44′20.40″N 117°0′2.88″E)
- Biao Hill (Chinese: 标山; pinyin: Biāo Shān, "Landmark Hill", 36°41′47.76″N 116°59′49.56″E)
- Fenghuang Hill (Chinese: 凤凰山; pinyin: Fènghuáng Shān, Fenghuang is the "Chinese Phoenix", 36°41′47.19″N 116°59′49.90″E)
- Northern Maan Hill (Chinese: 北马鞍山; pinyin: Běi Mǎ'ān Shān, literally "Northern Horseshoe Hill", 36°42′3.45″N 116°57′52.06″E)
- Su Hill (Chinese: 粟山; pinyin: Sù Shān, literally "Grain Hill",36°42′1.97″N 116°57′18.81″E)
- Kuang Hill (Chinese: 匡山; pinyin: Kuāng Shān, literally "Basket Hill", 36°41′10″N 116°56′33″E)
- Yao Hill (Chinese: 药山; pinyin: Yào Shān, literally "Medicine Hill", 36°42′44.17″N 116°57′32.59″E)

== Rivers, Streams, and Lakes ==
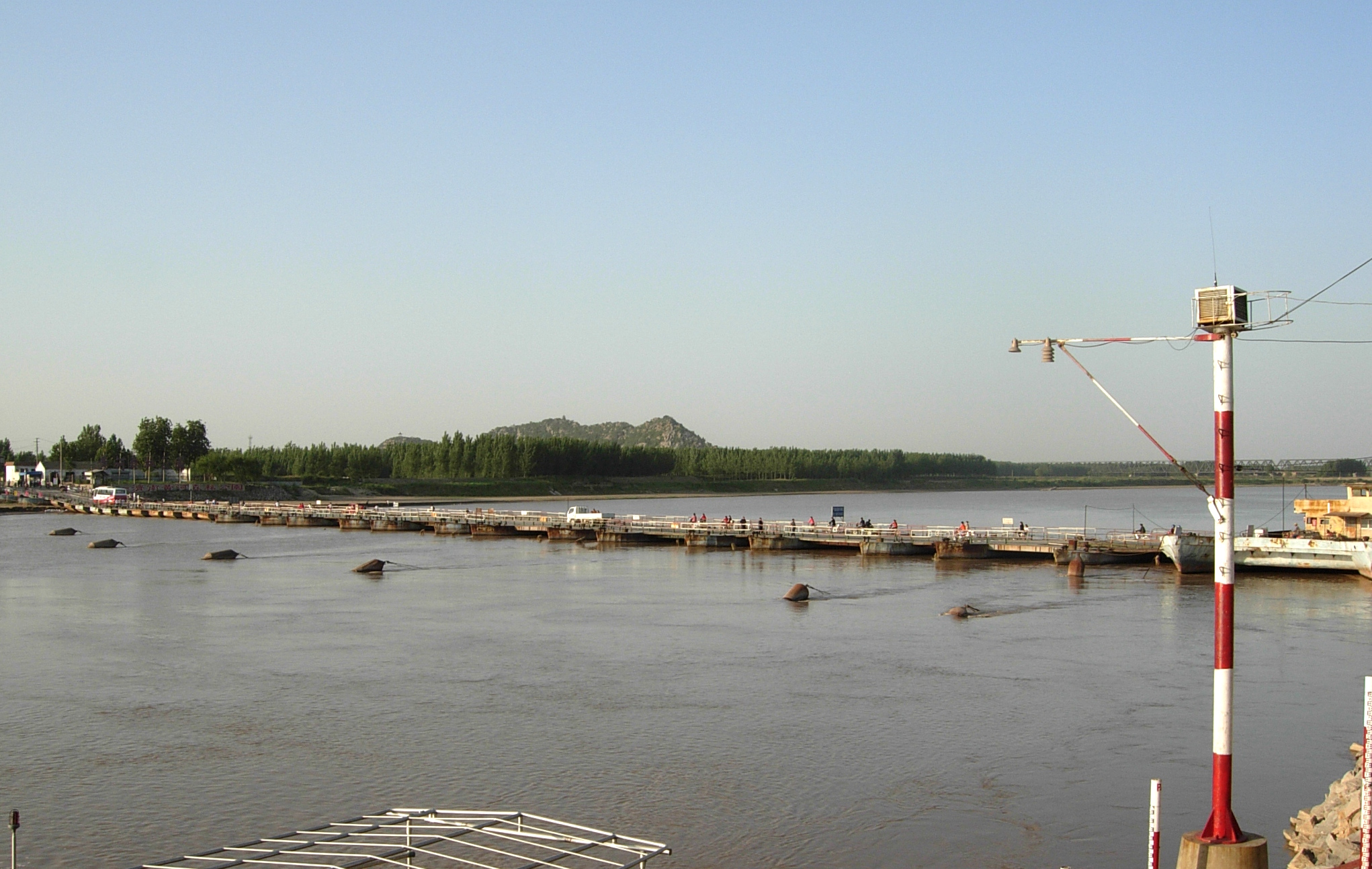
Yellow River with Que Hill in the background

- Yellow River (Chinese: 黃河; pinyin: Huáng Hé)
- Daming Lake (Chinese: 大明湖; pinyin: Dàmíng Hú, 36°40′29.46″N 117°1′3.18″E)
- White Cloud Lake (Chinese: 白云湖; pinyin: Bái Yún Hú, in Zhangqiu City, 36°51′19.13″N 117°23′17.01″E)
- Xiaoqing River (Chinese: 小清河; pinyin: Xiǎoqīng Hé)
- Luo River (Chinese: 泺河; pinyin: Luò Hé)
- Hundred Flower Pond (Chinese: 百花洲; pinyin: Bǎihuā Zhōu, 36°40′15.20″N 117°1′6.67″E)
- Jinan East Lake (Chinese: 济南东湖; pinyin: Jǐnán Dōnghú, 36°40′34.44″N 117°2′0.18″E)

== Parks and Nature Reserves ==
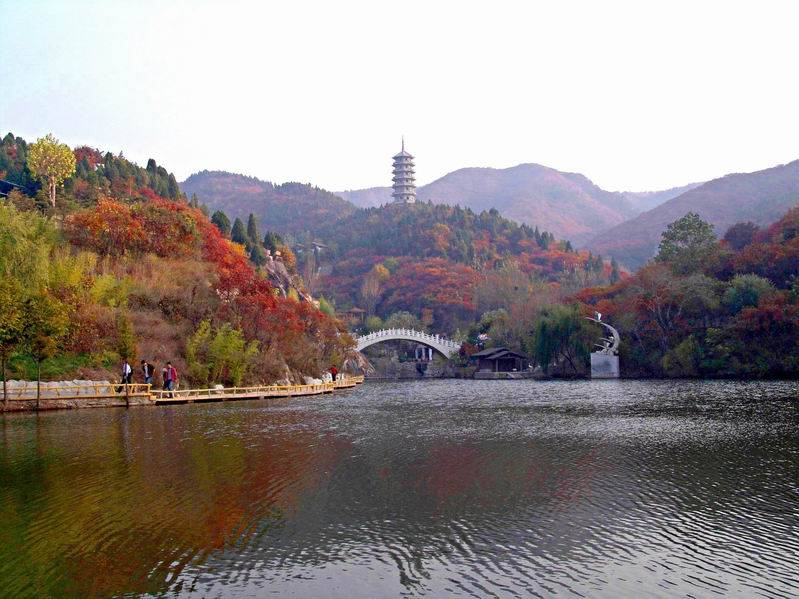
Red Leaves Valley

- Huang Tai Park Chinese: 黄台公园; pinyin: Huáng Tái Gōngyuán)
- Jinan Baihua Park (Chinese: 济南市百花公园; pinyin: Jǐnán Shì Bǎihuā Gōngyuán, 36°40′31.30″N 117°3′48.96″E)
- Jinan Botanical Garden (Chinese: 济南植物园; pinyin: Jǐnán Zhíwùyuán, 36°38′46.91″N 117°0′55.20″E)
- Jinan Zoo (Chinese: 济南动物园; pinyin: Jǐnán Dòngwùyuán, 36°42′4.97″N 116°58′55.29″E)
- Jinan Hundred Miles Yellow River Scenic Area (Chinese: 济南百里黄河风景区; pinyin: Jǐnán Bǎilǐ Huánghé Fēngjǐngqū, 36°43′56.83″N 116°57′28.5″E)
- Three Officials Temple Scenic Area (Chinese: 三官庙景区; pinyin: Sānguānmiào Jǐngqū, 36°43′19.31″N 117°01′27.35″E)
- Yellow River Forest Park (Chinese: 黄河森林公园; pinyin: Huánghé Sēnlín Gōngyuán, 36°43′44.01″N 116°59′27.53″E)
- Red Leaves Valley (Chinese: 红叶谷; pinyin: Hóng Yè Gǔ, 36°29′1.86″N 117°9′46.62″E)
- Coiling Dragon Hill Forest Park (Chinese: 蟠龙山森林公园; pinyin: Pán Lóngshān Sēnlín Gōngyuán)
- Yaoxiang National Forest Park (Chinese: 药乡国家森林公园; pinyin: Yàoxiāng Guójiā Sēnlín Gōngyuán)
- Waterscreen Canyon Scenic Area (Chinese: 水帘峡风景区; pinyin: Shuǐ Lián Xiá Fēngjǐngqū)
- Jinan Tang King Pingyuan Forest Park (Chinese: 济南唐王平原森林公园; pinyin: Jǐnán Táng Wáng Píngyuán Sēnlín Gōngyuán)
- Zhufeng Hill Scenic Area (Chinese: 朱凤山旅游风景区; pinyin: Zhūfèng Shān Lǚyóu Fēngjǐngqū)

== Museums and Libraries ==
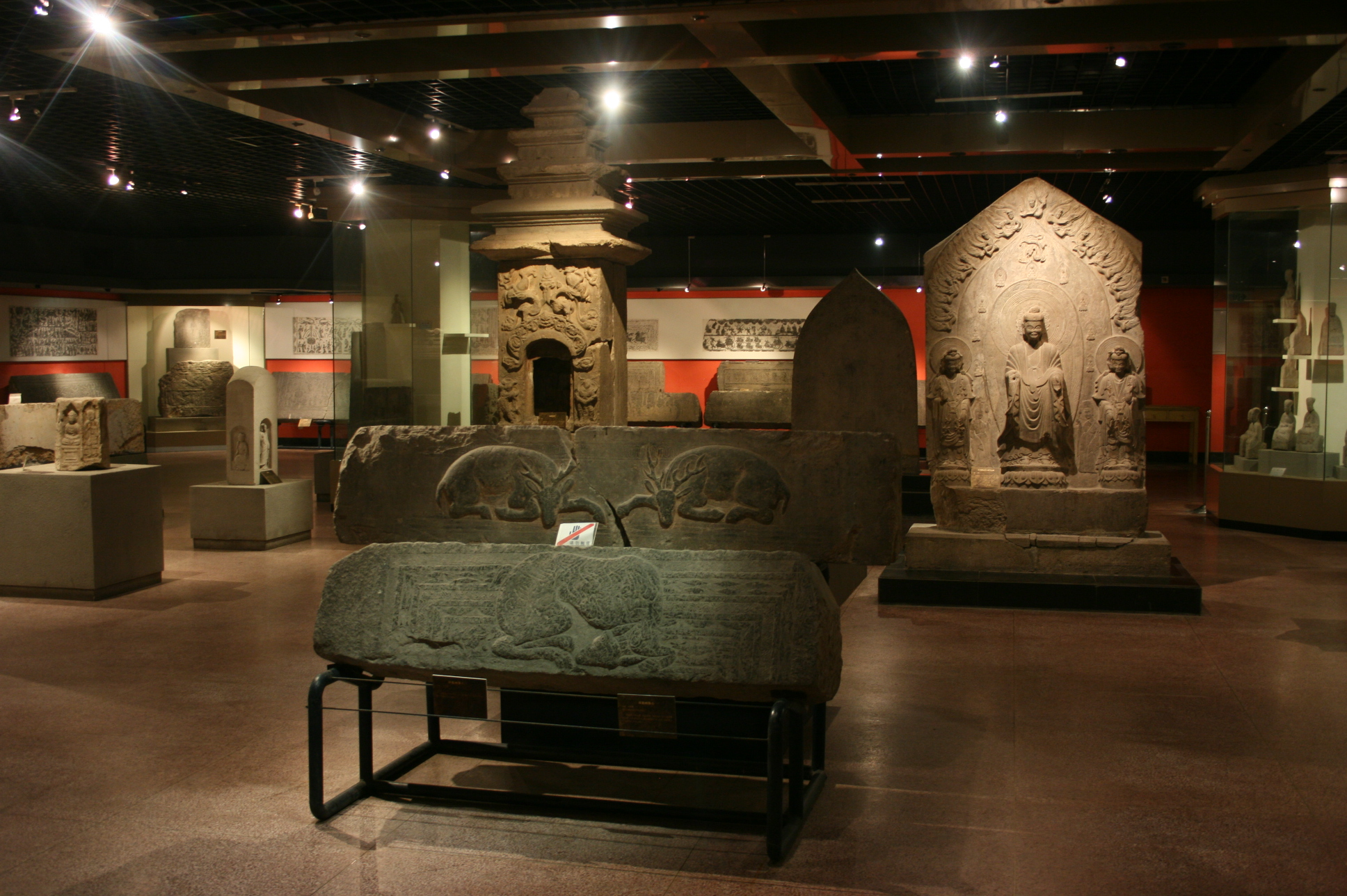
Shandong Provincial Museum

- Shandong Provincial Museum (Chinese: 山东省博物馆; pinyin: Shāndōng Shěng Bówùguǎn, 36°38′41.28″N 117°1′49.08″E)
- Jinan Municipal Museum (Chinese: 济南市博物馆; pinyin: Jǐnán Shì Bówùguǎn, address: Jing Shiyi Road No. 30, Chinese: 经十一路30号; pinyin: Jīng Shíyī Lù 30 hào, 36°38′41.79″N 117°1′14.93″E)
- Shandong Science and Technology Museum (Chinese: 山东省科技馆; pinyin: Shāndōng Shěng Kējì Guǎn)
- Shandong Provincial Library (Chinese: 山东省图书馆; pinyin: Shāndōng Shěng Túshūguǎn)
- Jinan Municipal Library (Chinese: 济南市图书馆; pinyin: Jǐnán Shì Túshūguǎn, 36°39′41.38″N 116°59′16.75″E)
- Guangzhi Yuan (Old Museum, Chinese: 广智院; pinyin: Guǎngzhì Yuàn,36°39′22.25″N 117°0′46.91″E)
- Zhangqiu Municipal Museum (Chinese: 章丘市博物馆; pinyin: Zhāngqiū Shì Bówùguǎn, address: Zhao-Qing Road No. 135, Zhangqiu City)
- Memorial Hall for the Battle of Jinan (Chinese: 济南战役纪念馆; pinyin: Jǐnán Zhànyì Jìniàn Guǎn,36°38′22.5″N 116°59′47″E)

== Archaeological Sites ==
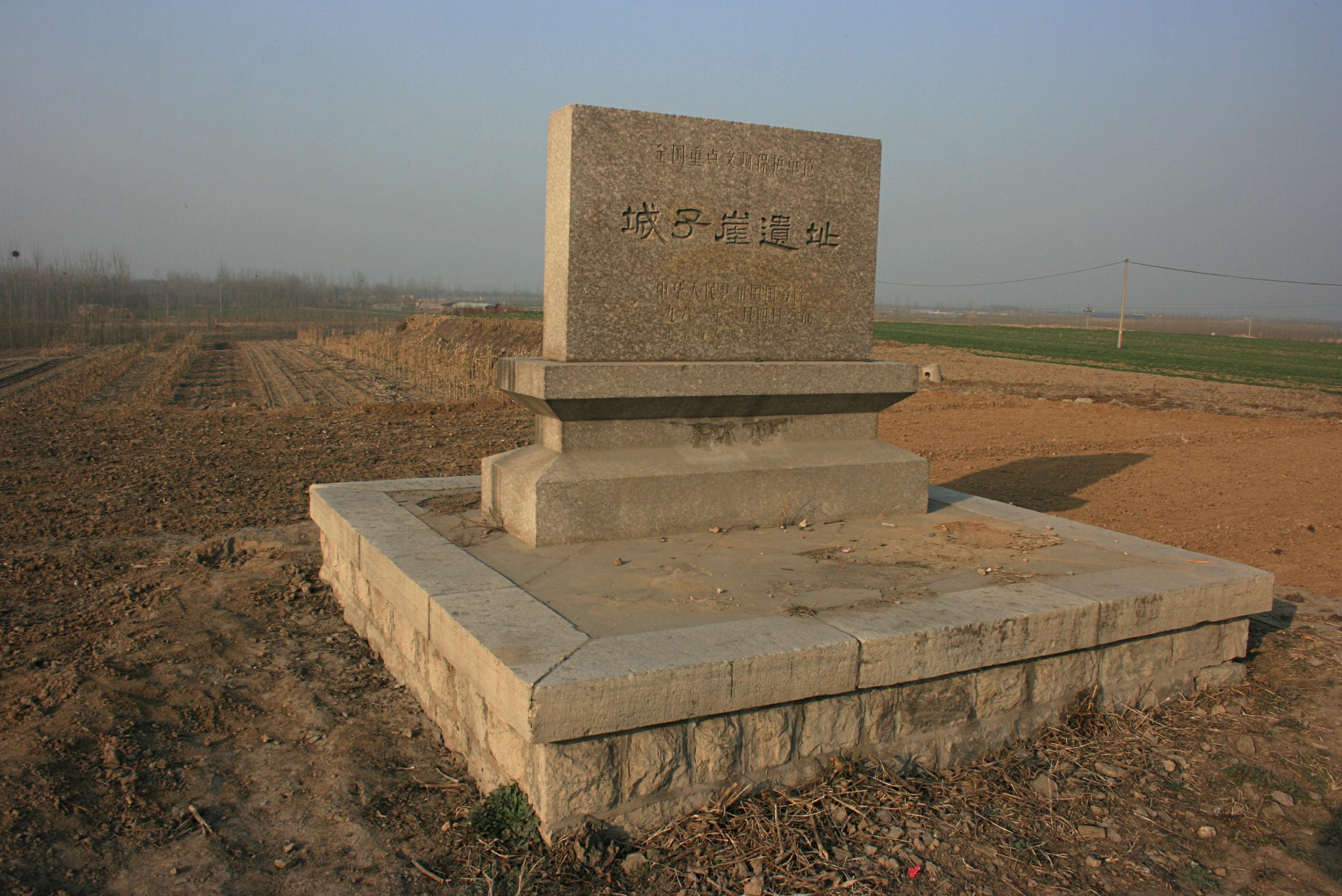
Marker at the Chengziya Archaeological Site

- Chengziya Archaeological Site (Chinese: 城子崖遗址博物馆; pinyin: Chéngzǐyá Yízhǐ Bówùguǎn, "Chengziya Ruins Museum", 36°44′8.88″N 117°21′14.94″E)
- Daxinzhuang Shang Period Archaeological Site (Chinese: 大辛庄商代遗址; pinyin: Dàxīnzhuāng Shāngdài Yízhǐ, in Wangsheren Town Chinese: 王舍人镇; pinyin: Wángshèrén Zhèn, Licheng District, to the northeast of the city center of Jinan)
- Luozhuang Han Tomb (Chinese: 洛庄汉墓; pinyin: Luòzhuāng Hàn Mù, 36°44′51.11″N 117°28′23.99″E)
- Shuangshan Han Tomb (Chinese: 双山汉墓; pinyin: Shuāngshān Hàn Mù, 36°28′43.14″N 116°39′30.38″E)
- Weishan Han Tomb (Chinese: 危山汉墓; pinyin: Wēishān Hàn Mù, south of Shèngjǐng Zhèn, Zhangqiu City)
- Tomb of the Jibei King (simplified Chinese: 汉济北王墓; traditional Chinese: 漢濟北王墓; pinyin: Hàn Jìběi Wáng Mù)

== Religious Sites ==
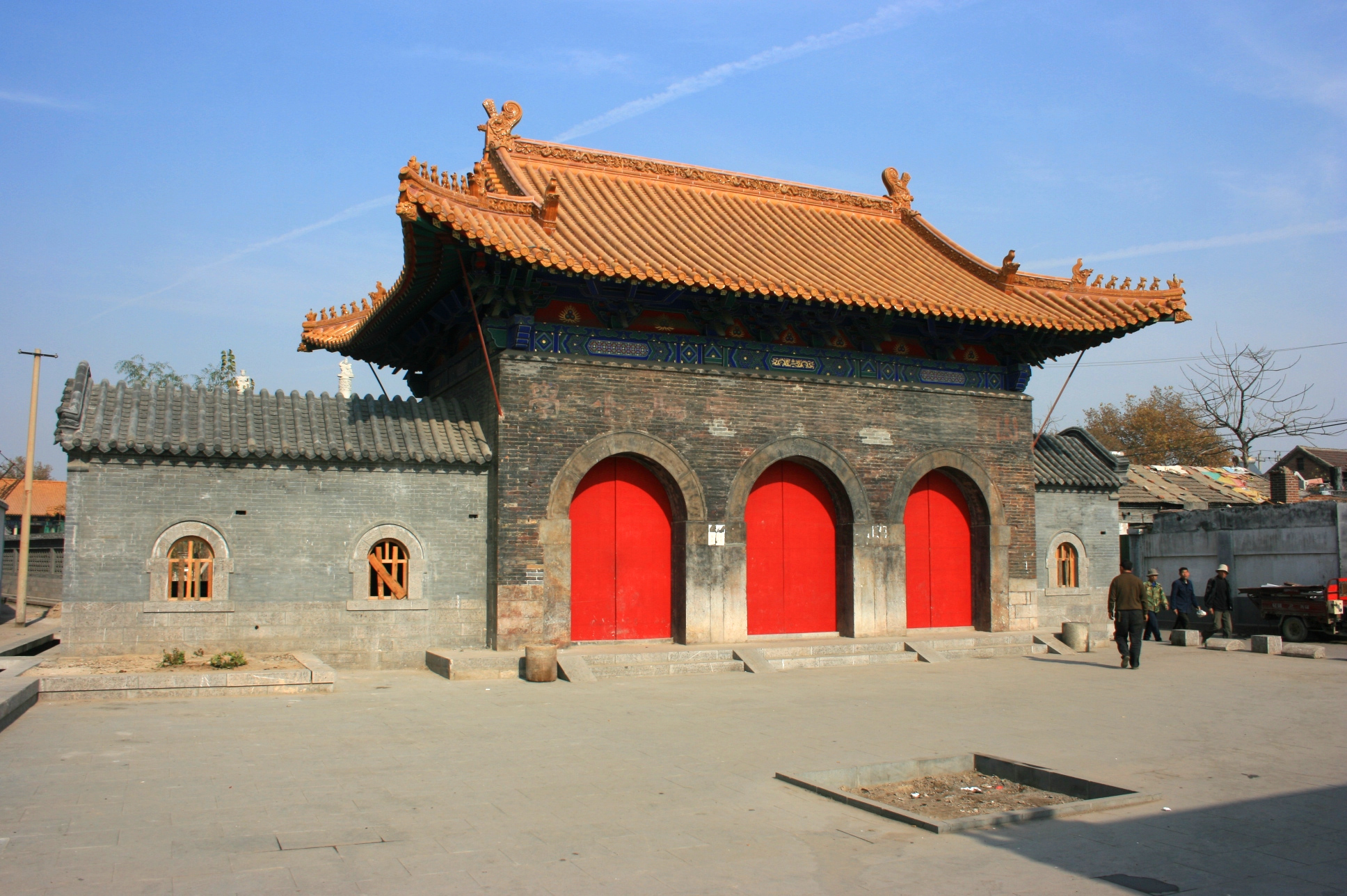
Confucian Temple in November 2008

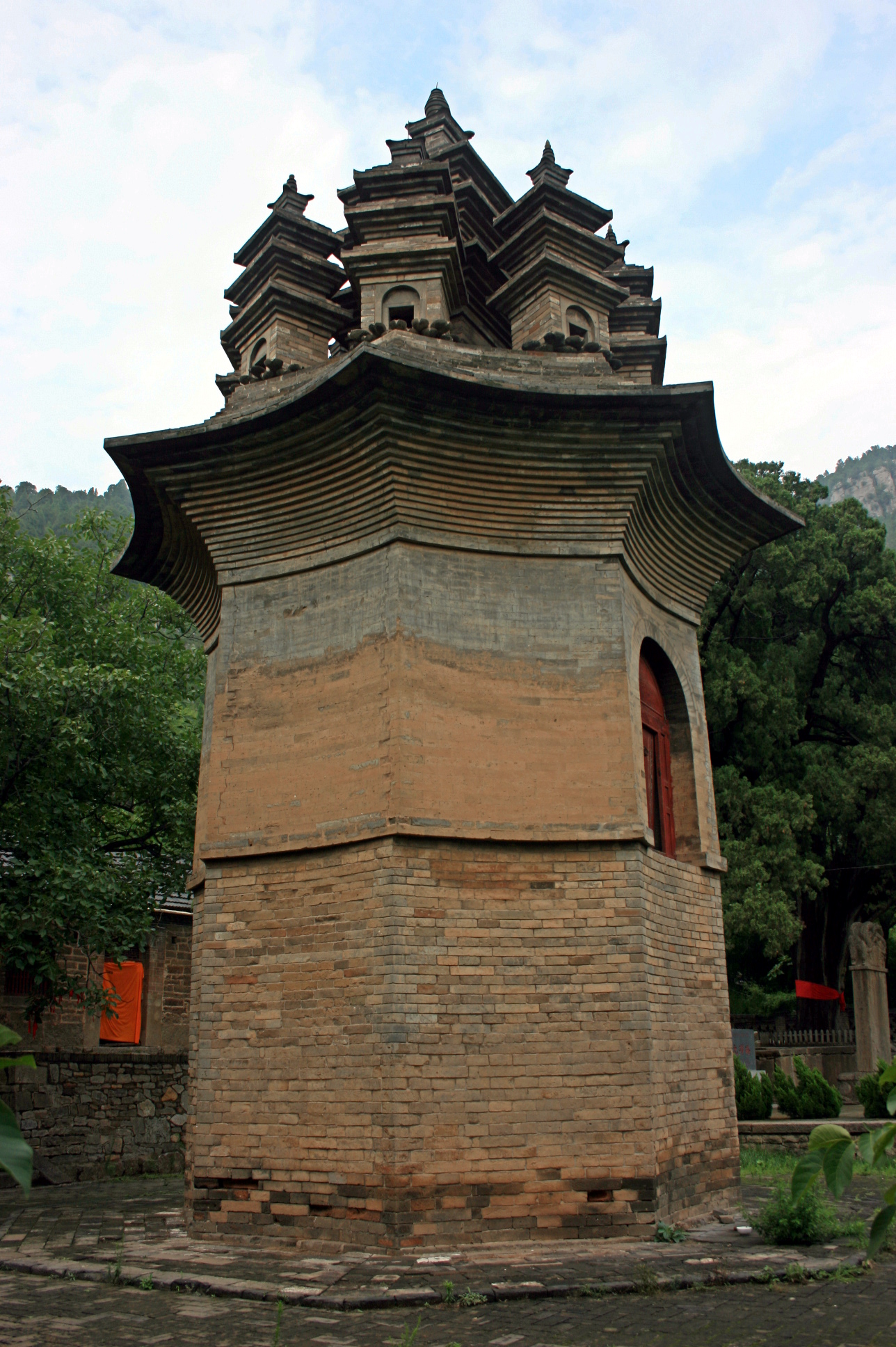
Nine Pinnacle Pagoda

- Fuxue Confucian Temple (Chinese: 府学文庙; pinyin: Fǔxué Wén Miào)
- Chenjialou Saint Joseph Church (Chinese: 陈家楼天主教堂; pinyin: Chénjiālóu Tiānzhǔ Jiàotáng, built in 1909, address: Qian Chenjialou 63, 36°40′27.13″N 116°59′51.64″E)
- Dragon Cave (Chinese: 龙洞; pinyin: Lóng Dòng, 36°35′54.31″N 117°7′17.97″E)
- Xiaotang Mountain Han Shrine (Chinese: 孝堂山郭氏墓石祠; pinyin: Xiàotángshān Guō Shì Mù Shí Cí, literally "Xiaotang Mountain Guo Family Tomb Stone Ancestral Hall", 36°24′35.46″N 116°36′56.52″E)
- Great Southern Mosque (Chinese: 济南清真南大寺; pinyin: Jǐnán Qīngzhēn Nán Dà Sì, 36°39′30.54″N 117°0′13.21″E)
- Great Northern Mosque (Chinese: 济南清真北大寺; pinyin: Jǐnán Qīngzhēn Běi Dà Sì, 36°39′39.28″N 117°0′13.93″E)
- Dahuaishu Mosque (Chinese: 大槐树清真寺; pinyin: Dàhuáishù Qīngzhēn Sì, address: North Dahuaishu Street, Huaiyin District; Chinese: 槐荫区北大槐树街; pinyin: Huáiyìn Qū Běi Dàhuáishù Jiē)
- Nanguan Mosque (Chinese: 济南南关清真寺; pinyin: Jǐnán Nánguān Qīngzhēn Sì, address: Zhengjue Temple Street; Chinese: 正觉寺街; pinyin: Zhèngjué Sì Jiē)
- Liuxing Mosque (Chinese: 柳行清真寺; pinyin: Liǔxíng Qīngzhēn Sì, address: Liuxing East Street, Shizhong District; Chinese: 市中区柳行东街; pinyin: Shìzhōng Qū Liǔxíng Dōng Jiē)
- Dikou Mosque (Chinese: 堤口清真寺; pinyin: Dīkǒu Qīngzhēn Sì, address: Cuijiadikou, Dikou Village; Chinese: 堤口庄崔家堤口; pinyin: Dīkǒu Zhuāng Cuījiādīkǒu)
- Luokou Mosque (Chinese: 洛口清真寺; pinyin: Luòkǒu Qīngzhēn Sì, address: Tianqiao District; Chinese: 天桥区; pinyin: Tiānqiáo Qū)
- Xiaozhai Village Mosque (Chinese: 小寨村清真寺; pinyin: Xiǎozhài Cūn Qīngzhēn Sì, 36°44′0.60″N 116°46′12″E)
- Guandi Temple (Water Lily Street) (Chinese: 芙蓉街关帝庙; pinyin: Fúróng Jiē Guāndì Miào,36°40′5.42″N 117°1′23.09″E)
- Guandi Temple (Communist Youth League Street) (Chinese: 共青团路关帝庙; pinyin: Gòngqīngtuán Lù Guāndì Miào, 36°39′51.42″N 117°0′48.38″E)
- Kaiyuan Temple Ruins (Chinese: 开元寺遗址; pinyin: Kāiyuán Sì Yízhǐ, 36°37′43.33″N 117°2′50.41″E)
- Lingyan Temple (simplified Chinese: 灵岩寺; traditional Chinese: 靈巖寺; pinyin: Língyán Sì)
- Sacred Heart Cathedral (Chinese: 洪家楼耶稣圣心主教座堂; pinyin: Hóngjiālóu Yēsū Shèngxīn Zhǔjiào Zuòtáng; lit. 'Hongjia Lou Jesus Sacred Heart Cathedral', 36°41′8.79″N 117°3′34.38″E)
- Huzhuang Church (Chinese: 胡庄教堂; pinyin: Húzhuāng Jiàotáng, 36°14′26.22″N 116°25′51.96″E)
- Shentong Temple Ruins (Chinese: 神通寺遗址; pinyin: Shéntōng Sì Yízhǐ)
- Three Emperor Temple Ruins (Chinese: 三皇庙遗址; pinyin: Sān Huáng Miào Yízhǐ)
- Great Buddha Head (Chinese: 大佛头; pinyin: Dà Fó Tóu, 36°37′39.10″N 117°2′54.68″E)
- Four Gates Pagoda (Chinese: 四门塔; pinyin: Sì Mén Tǎ,36°27′3.24″N 117°7′47.28″E )
- Dragon-and-Tiger Pagoda (Chinese: 龙虎塔; pinyin: Lóng Hǔ Tǎ)
- Thousand-Buddha Cliff (Chinese: 千佛崖; pinyin: Qiānfó Yá)
- Nine Pinnacle Pagoda (Chinese: 九顶塔; pinyin: Jiǔ Dǐng Tǎ, also "Nine Roof Pagoda", 36°25′15.62″N 117°7′49.73″E)
- Jingsi Road Christian Church (Chinese: 经四路基督教堂; pinyin: Jīngsì Lù Jīdūjiào Táng, 36°39′36.36″N 116°58′49.62″E)

== Monuments ==
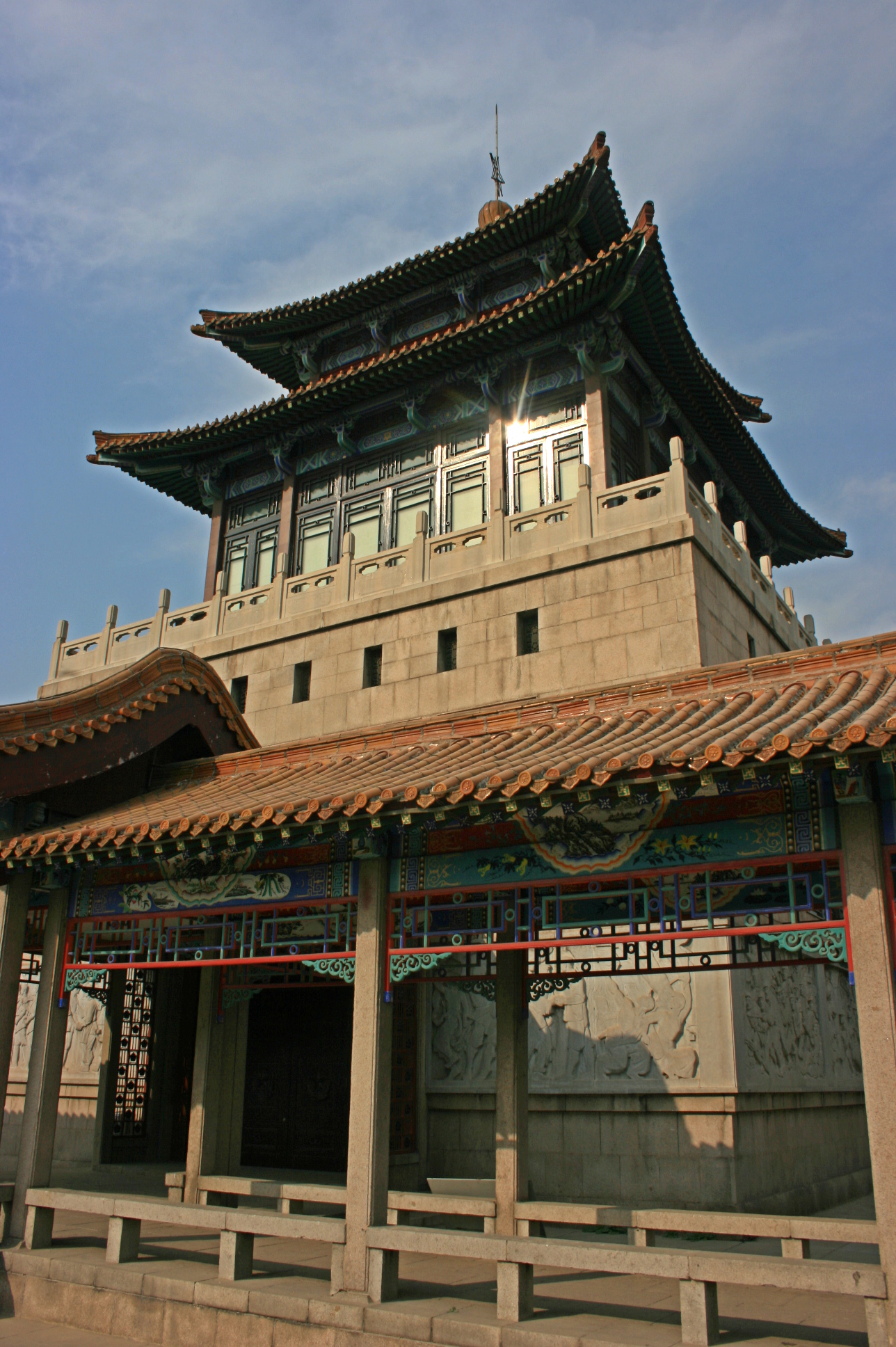
Liberation Pavilion

- Jinan Campaign Memorial (Chinese: 济南战役纪念馆; pinyin: Jǐnán Zhànyì Jǐniàn Guǎn, 36.639653°N 116.996756°E)
- Liberation Pavilion (Chinese: 解放阁; pinyin: Jiěfàng Gé, 36°39′46.08″N 117°1′40.01″E)
- Jinan Massacre Monument (Chinese: 济南惨案纪念碑; pinyin: Jǐnán Cǎn'àn Jìniàn Bēi, 36°39′45.36″N 117°0′39.84″E)
- May 3rd Massacre Memorial Garden (in the Baotu Spring Park, close to Jinan Massacre Monument)
- Tomb of Bian Que (Chinese: 扁鹊墓; pinyin: Biǎn Que Mù)
- Tomb of Min Ziqian (Chinese: 闵子骞墓; pinyin: Mǐn Zǐqiān Mù, 36°40′33.67″N 117°3′38.05″E)
- Tomb of Zhang Yanghao (Chinese: 张养浩墓; pinyin: Zhāng Yǎnghào Mù, 36°42′19.37″N 117°2′35.79″E)
- Heroes Pavilion (Chinese: 英雄亭; pinyin: Yīngxióng Tíng)

== Historical Buildings ==
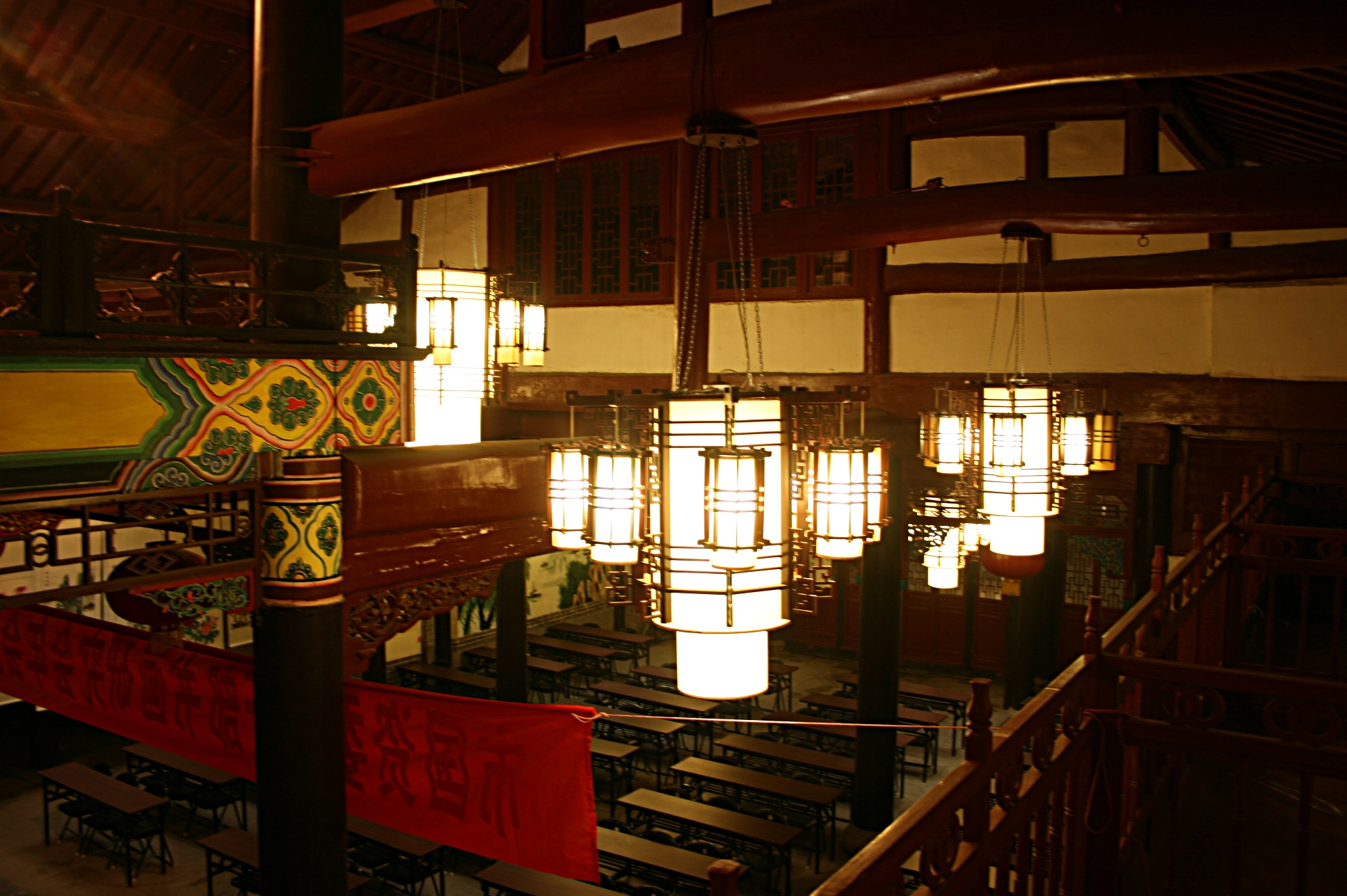
Interior of Zhejiang Fujian Meeting Hall

- Former Shandong Nationalist Government Foreign Affairs Office (Chinese: 国民政府山东交涉公署旧址; pinyin: Guómín Zhèngfǔ Shāndōng Jiāoshè Gōngshǔ Jiùzhǐ, site of the murder of Cai Gongshi, Jingsi Road Number 370, Chinese: 经四路370号; pinyin: Jīngsì Lù 370 hào, 36°39′33.96″N 116°58′50.04″E)
- Chaoran Tower (Chinese: 超然楼; pinyin: Chāorán Lóu; lit. 'Tower of Transcendence', reconstruction of a historical tower near Daming Lake, 36°40′29″N 117°1′33″E).
- Dao Yuan, (Chinese: 济南道院; pinyin: Jǐnán Dàoyuàn, built 1934–1942, formerly a compound of the Red Swastika Society, 36°39′19.83″N 117°0′27.56″E)
- Great Wall of Qi (simplified Chinese: 齐长城; traditional Chinese: 齊長城; pinyin: Qí Chángchéng)
- Jin Family Home (Chinese: 金家大院; pinyin: Jīnjiā Dàyuàn, Kuanhousuo Street Number 55, Chinese: 宽厚所街55号; pinyin: Kuānhòusuǒ Jiē 55 hào,)
- Jinan Campaign Kuomintang Garrison Temporary Headquarters (Chinese: 济南战役国民党守军临时指挥部; pinyin: Jǐnán Zhànyì Guómíndǎng Shǒujūn Línshí Zhǐhuībù, in Daming Lake Park, north of the lake)
- Jinan German-Chinese Bank Building (Chinese: 济南德华银行旧址; pinyin: Jǐnán Déhuá Yínháng Jiùzhǐ, 36°39′55.80″N 116°59′25.80″E)
- Jinan Former Japanese Military Police Headquarters (Chinese: 济南日本宪兵司令部旧址; pinyin: Jǐnán Rìběn Xiànbīng Sīlìngbù Jiùzhǐ, 36°40′4.42″N 116°59′14.76″E)
- Jinan Jiao-Ji Railway Station (Chinese: 胶济铁路火车站; pinyin: Jiāojǐ Tiělù Huǒchēzhàn, 36°40′4.03″N 116°59′20.87″E)
- Jinan Nanjiao Hotel (Chinese: 济南南郊宾馆; pinyin: Jǐnán Nánjiāo Bīnguǎn, address: No. 2 Maanshan Road, Jinan, 36°38′28.24″N 117°0′46.14″E)
- Republican Building (Chinese: 共和楼; pinyin: Gònghé Lóu, 36°39′24.05″N 117°0′40.85″E)
- Rui Fu Xiang Silk Clothing Store (Chinese: 瑞蚨祥绸布店; pinyin: Ruì Fú Xiáng Chóu Bù Diàn, Jinger Road Number 215, Chinese: 经二路215号; pinyin: Jīng'èr Lù 215 hào)
- Shandong Province Minsheng Bank Building (Chinese: 山东省民生银行旧址; pinyin: Shāndōng Shěng Mínshēng Yínháng Jiùzhǐ)
- Shen Family Home (Chinese: 沈家大院; pinyin: Shěnjiā Dàyuàn, Kuanhousuo Street Number 47, Chinese: 宽厚所街47号; pinyin: Kuānhòusuǒ Jiē 47 hào,)
- Wei Family Home (Chinese: 魏家大院; pinyin: Wèijiā Dàyuàn, Kuanhousuo Street Numbers 16 and 18, Chinese: 宽厚所街16和18号; pinyin: Kuānhòusuǒ Jiē 16 hé 18 hào,)
- Zhejiang Fujian Meeting Hall (Chinese: 浙闽会馆; pinyin: Zhèmǐn Huìguǎn, 36°39′45.72″N 117°1′30.00″E)
- Zhu Home Valley (Chinese: 朱家峪; pinyin: Zhūjiā Yù, Zhangqiu City, 36°40′13.62″N 117°33′30.68″E,)

== Transportation ==
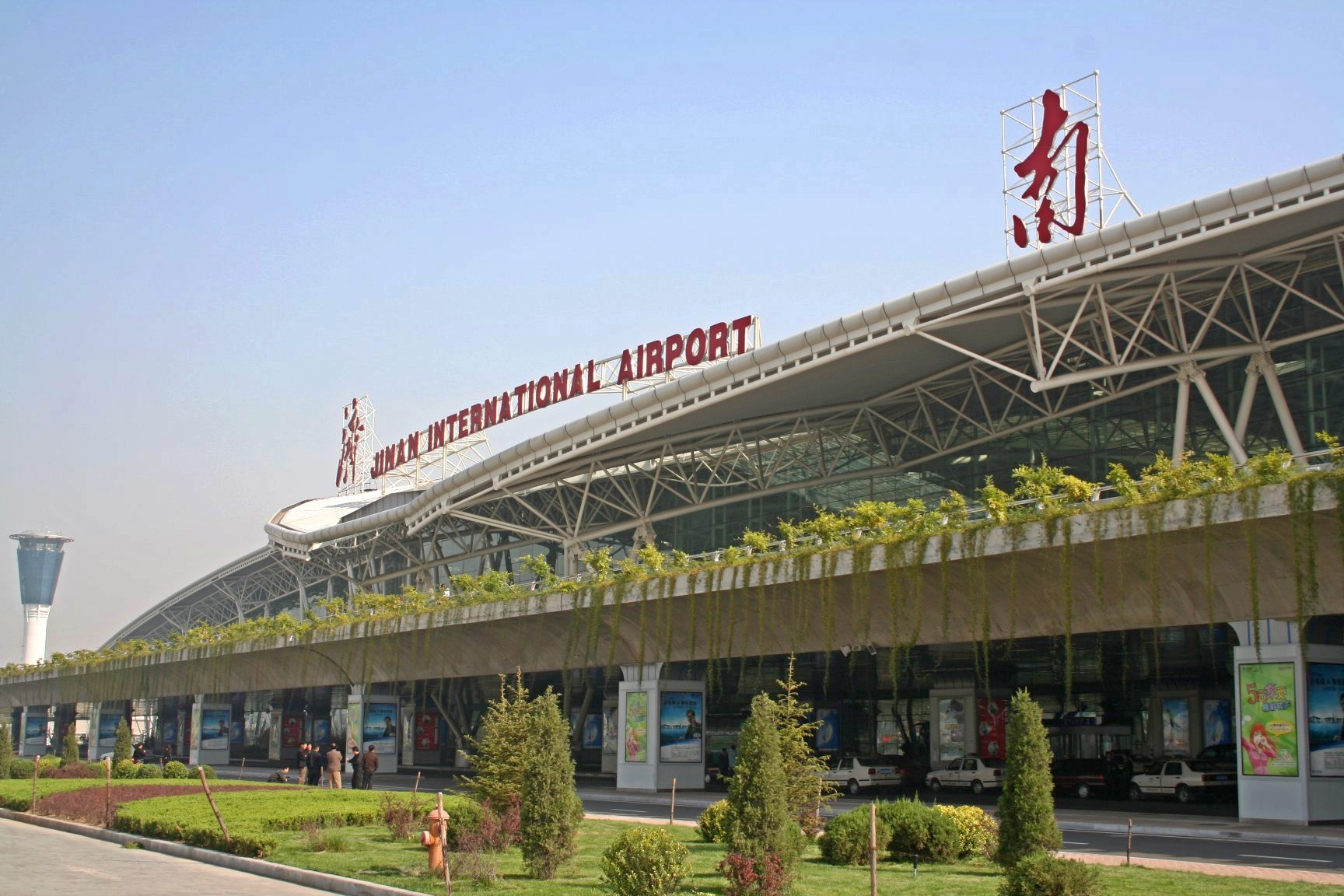
Jinan Yaoqiang International Airport

- Huangtai railway station (Chinese: 黄台火车站; pinyin: Huángtāi Huǒchēzhān)
- Jinan Yaoqiang International Airport (Chinese: 济南遥墙国际机场; pinyin: Jǐnán Yáoqiáng Guójì Jīcháng, 36°51′26″N 117°12′58″E)
- Jinan Railway Station (Chinese: 济南火车站; pinyin: Jǐnán Huǒchēzhàn, 36°40′12.26″N 116°59′7.84″E)
- Luokou Yellow River Railway Bridge (Chinese: 泺口黄河铁路桥; pinyin: Luòkǒu Huánghé Tiělù Qiáo)
- Jinan Yellow River Bridge (Chinese: 济南黄河大桥; pinyin: Jǐnán Huánghé Dà Qiáo, 36°45′23.49″N 117°1′54.54″E)

== Universities and colleges ==
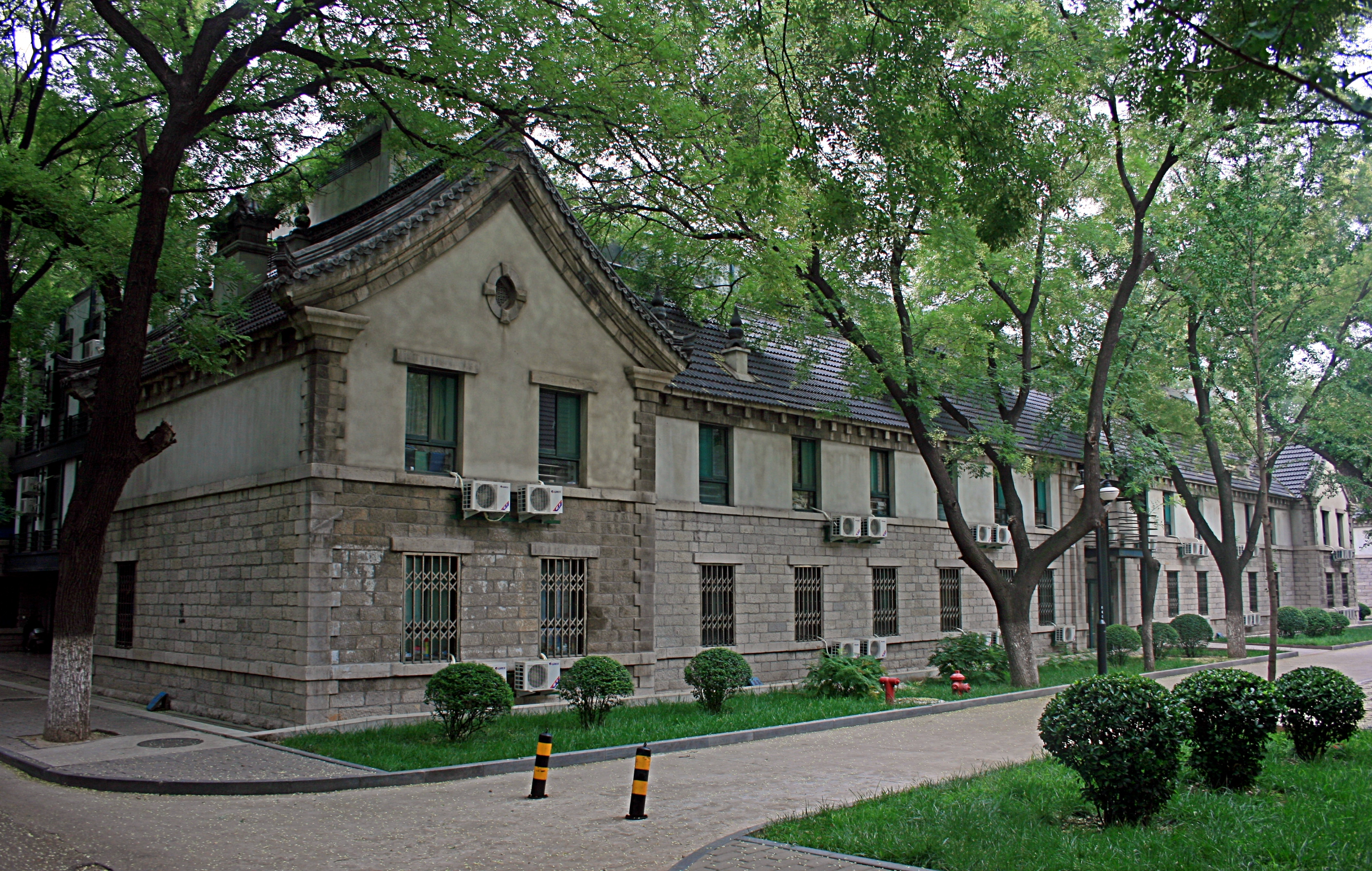
Shandong University

- Shandong University (Chinese: 山东大学; pinyin: Shāndōng Dàxué)
- University of Jinan (Chinese: 济南大学; pinyin: Jǐnán Dàxué)
- Shandong Normal University (Chinese: 山东师范大学; pinyin: Shāndōng Shīfàn Dàxué)
- Shandong Jianzhu University (Chinese: 山东建筑大学; pinyin: Shāndōng Jiànzhù Dàxué)
- Shandong Jiaotong University (Chinese: 山东交通学院; pinyin: Shāndōng Jiāotōng Xuéyuàn)
- Shandong University of Finance and Economics (Chinese: 山东财经大学; pinyin: Shāndōng Cáijīng Dàxué)
- Shandong University of Chinese Traditional Medicine (Chinese: 山东中医药大学; pinyin: Shāndōng Zhōngyīyào Dàxué)
- Shandong University of Arts (Chinese: 山东艺术学院; pinyin: Shāndōng Yìshù Xuéyuàn)
- Shandong College of Arts and Design (Chinese: 山东工艺美术学院; pinyin: Shāndōng Gōngyìměishù Xuéyuàn)
- Shandong Physical Education Institute (Chinese: 山东体育学院; pinyin: Shāndōng Tǐyù Xuéyuàn)
- Jinan Railway Polytechnic (Chinese: 济南铁道职业技术学院; pinyin: Jǐnán Tiědào Zhíyèjìshù Xuéyuàn)

== Cultural Venues ==
- Shandong Dance Theater (Chinese: 山东歌舞剧院; pinyin: Shāndōng Gēwǔ Jùyuàn, address: Culture Road West number 123; Chinese: 文化西路123号; pinyin: Wénhuà Xī Lù 123 hào, 36°39′23.15″N 117°0′39.46″E)
- Shandong Province Peking Opera Theater (Chinese: 山东省京剧院; pinyin: Shāndōng Shěng Jīng Jùyuàn, address: Lishan Road number 36-2; Chinese: 历山路36-2号; pinyin: Lìshān Lù 36-2 hào, 36°40′42.18″N 117°2′59.05″E)
- Shandong Theater (Chinese: 山东剧院; pinyin: Shāndōng Jùyuàn, address: Culture Road West number 117; Chinese: 文化西路117号; pinyin: Wénhuà Xī Lù 117 hào, 36°39′21.29″N 117°0′45.68″E)
- Ming Hu Ju (Chinese: 明湖居; pinyin: Míng Hú Jū, address: Daminghu Road number 29, Lixia, Jinan 250011, Chinese: 大明湖路29号; pinyin: Dàmínghú Lù 29 hào, 36°40′23.5″N 117°01′40.8″E)

== Sports Venues ==
- Jinan China National Games Sports Center (Chinese: 济南奥体中心; pinyin: Jǐnán Àotǐ Zhōngxīn, 36°39′29.62″N 117°6′36.81″E)
- Shandong Provincial Stadium (Chinese: 山东省体育场; pinyin: Shāndōng Shěng Tǐyù Cháng, 36°38′48.04″N 117°0′20.80″E)

== Public Roads and Squares ==
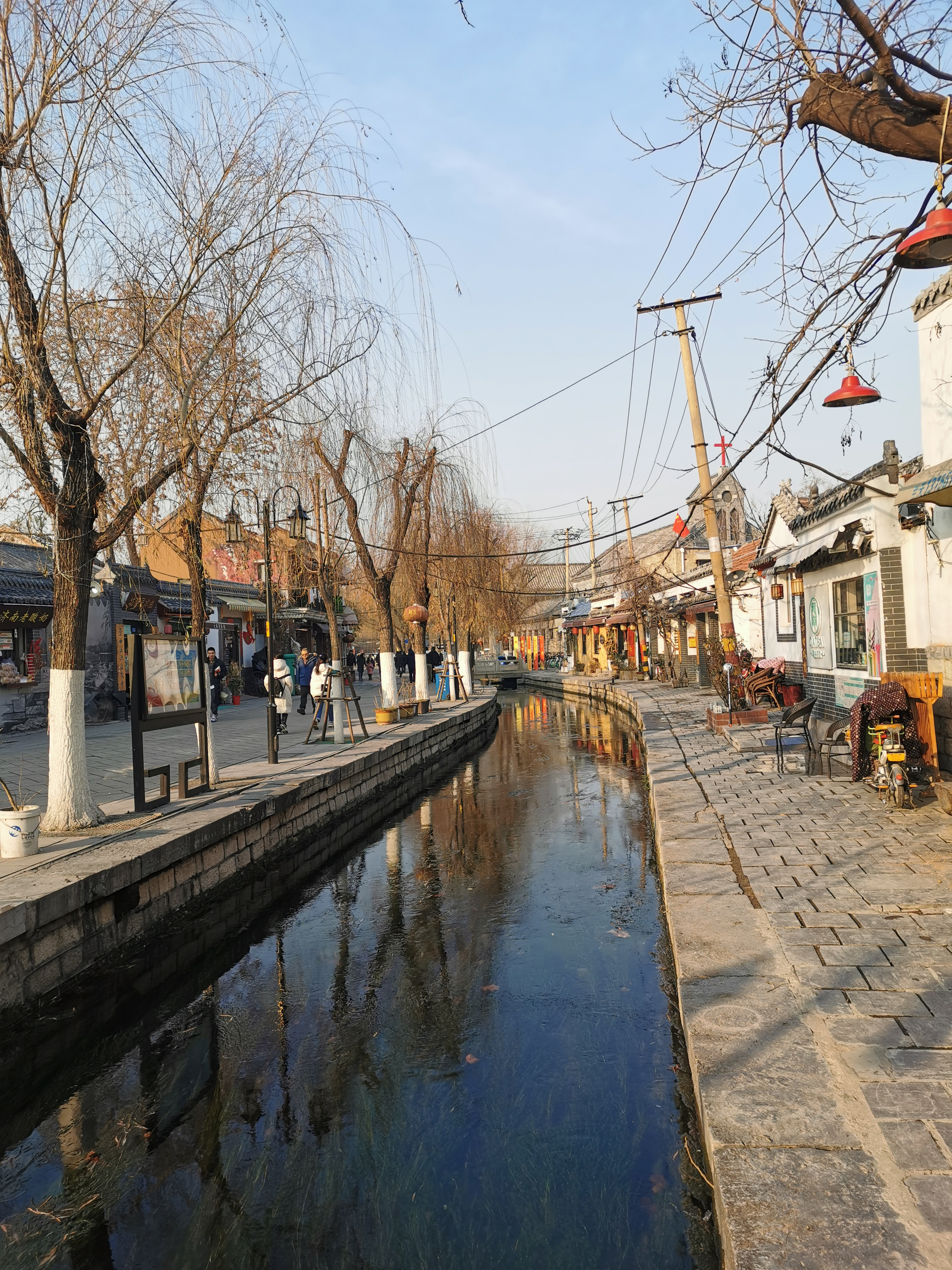
Qushuiting Street in November 2008

- Hongjialou Square (Chinese: 洪家楼广场; pinyin: Hóngjiālóu Guǎngcháng, 36°41′4.6″N 117°3′35.7″E)
- Qushuiting Street (Chinese: 曲水亭街; pinyin: Qūshuǐtíng Jiē; lit. 'Winding water pavilion street', 36°40′10.56″N 117°1′6.42″E)
- Shengfuqian Street (Chinese: 省府前街; pinyin: Shěngfǔqián Jiē; lit. 'Street in front of the provincial government', 36.668479°N 117.0146°E)
- Spring City Road (Chinese: 泉城路; pinyin: Quán Chéng Lù)
- Spring City Square (Chinese: 泉城广场; pinyin: Quán Chéng Guǎngcháng, 36°39′40.53″N 117°0′55.08″E)
- Water Lily Street (Chinese: 芙蓉街; pinyin: Fúróng Jiē, 36°39′53.73″N 117°1′2.09″E)

== Eight Sceneries of Jinan ==
Historically, eight sceneries in Jinan have been renowned for their beauty; they are known as the "Eight Sceneries of Jinan" (Chinese: 济南八景; pinyin: Jìnán Bā Jǐng). The eight sceneries are defined not only by location, but also other factors such as season and weather:

1. Early spring at Jingping Cliff (Chinese: 锦屏春晓; pinyin: Jǐnpíng chūnxiǎo; lit. 'Brocade screen [cliff] spring dawn')
2. Baotu Spring gushing into the air (Chinese: 趵突腾空; pinyin: Bàotū téngkōng)
3. Appreciating chrysanthemums at Buddha Hill (Fohui Hill, not the nearby Thousand Buddha Mountain, Chinese: 佛山赏菊; pinyin: Fóshān shǎngjú)
4. Mist at Que and Hua Hills (Chinese: 鹊华烟雨; pinyin: Què huá yān yǔ)
5. Sunset at Huibo Building (at Daming Lake, Chinese: 汇波晚照; pinyin: Huìbō wǎnzhào, also Chinese: 会波晚照; pinyin: Huìbō wǎnzhào)
6. Boating on Daming Lake (Chinese: 明湖泛舟; pinyin: Míng hú fàn zhōu)
7. Snow reflections at the White Clouds Building (next to the Pearl Spring, Chinese: 白云雪霁; pinyin: Bái yún xuě jì)
8. Autumn wind at Lixia Pavilion (on an island in Daming Lake, Chinese: 历下秋风; pinyin: Lìxià qiū fēng)

== See also ==
- Major historical and cultural sites protected by Shandong Province
