= Zhejiang Fujian Meeting Hall =

Historic building in Jinan, Shandong, China

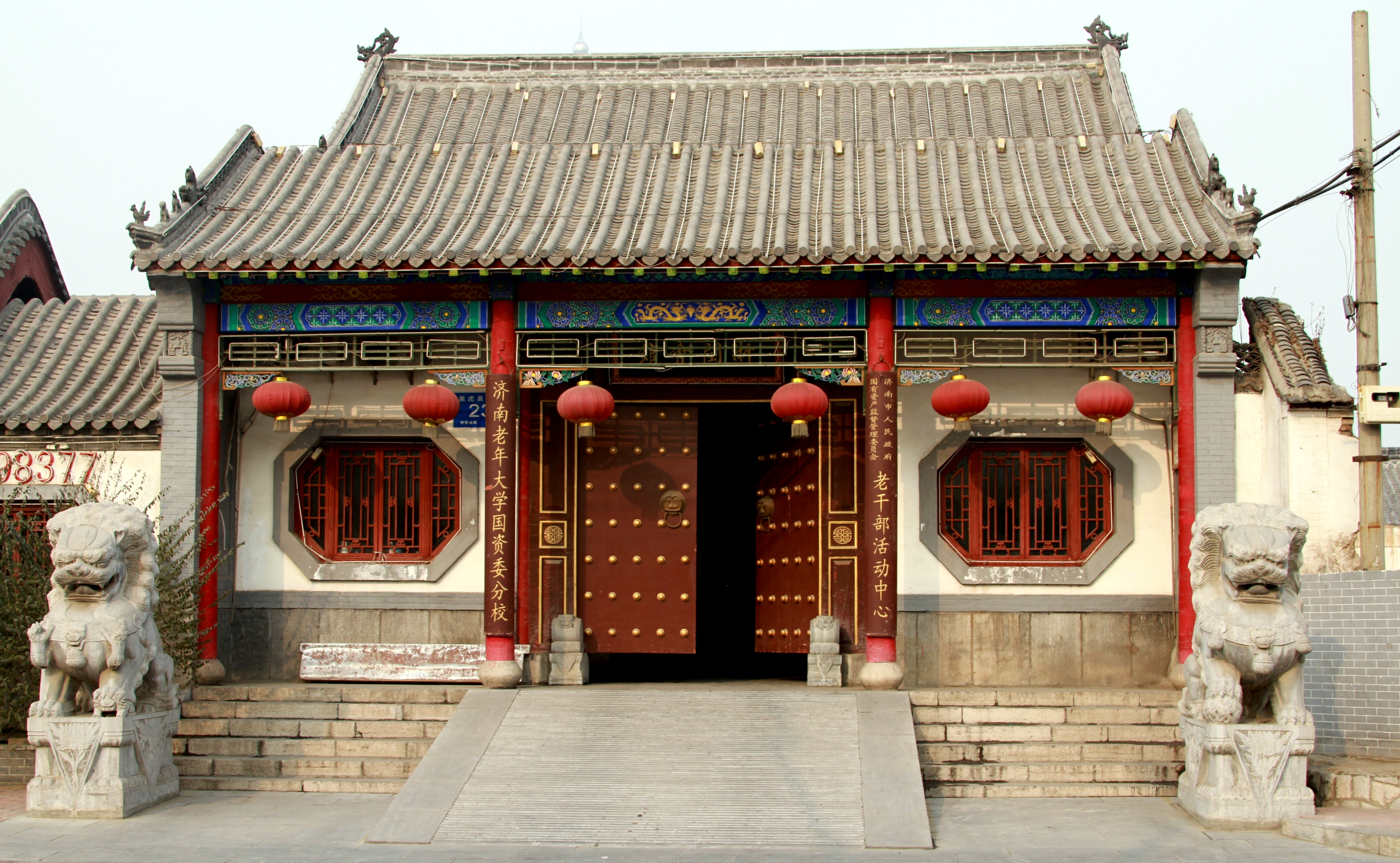
Main entrance of the meeting hall

The Zhejiang and Fujian Meeting Hall (Chinese: 浙闽会馆; pinyin: Zhèmǐn Huìguǎn) is a historical Qing- Dynasty building in the City of Jinan, Shandong Province, China. It served as a meeting hall for traders form Zhejiang and Fujian living in Jinan and is the last remaining structure of its kind in the city. It illustrates the importance of Jinan as a trading center in the second half of the 19th century.

== Historical background ==
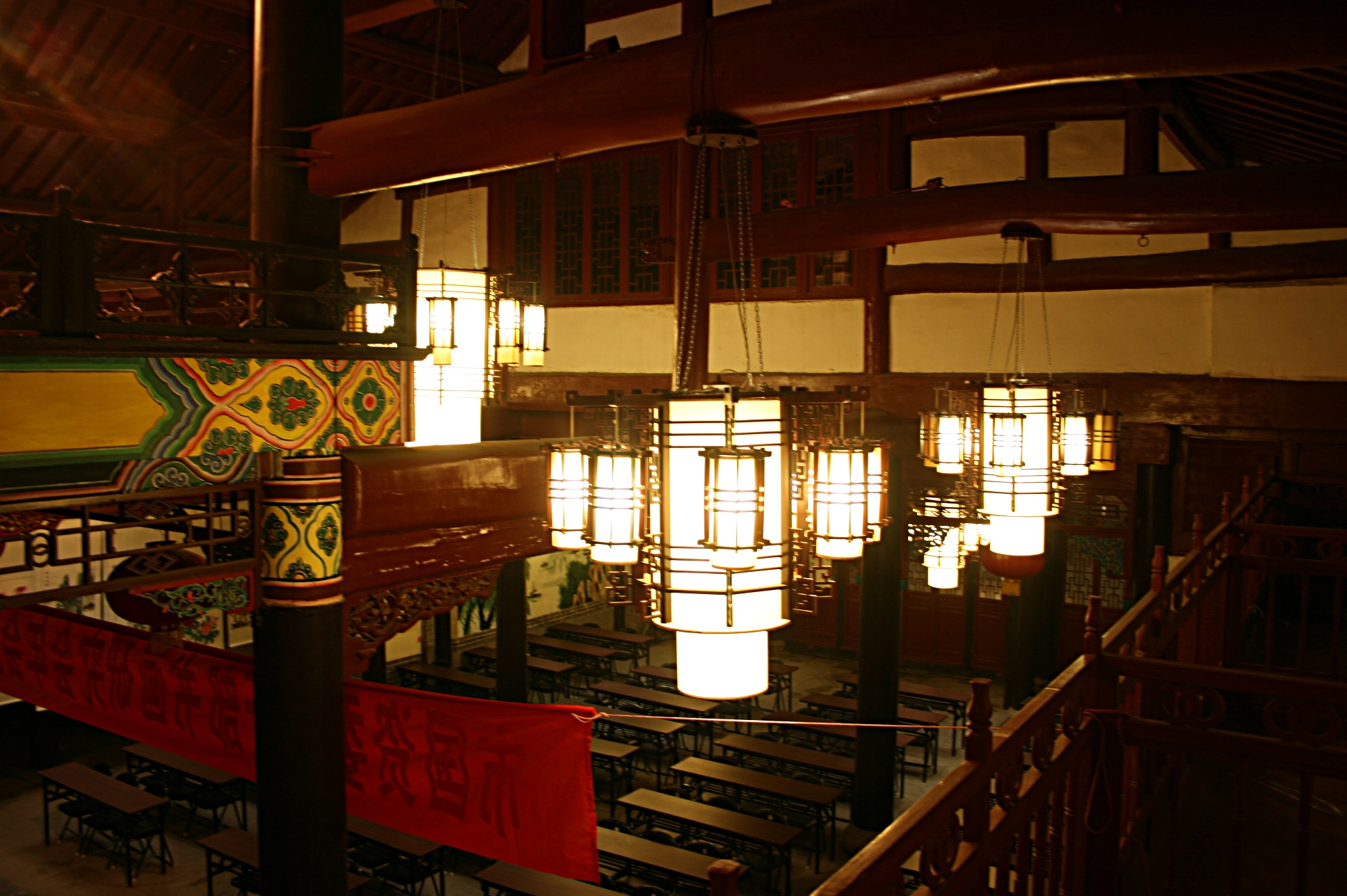
View of the theater hall from the balcony

The city of Jinan has been one of the major transportation and trading centers in the north of China for long time, particularly so after the Yellow River shifted its bed to the immediate north of the city in 1852. As a consequence, traders from other regions of China came to Jinan and established their businesses there. Groups of traders from the same home region set up meeting halls in order to make themselves feel at home, provide a convenient location for their business activities, foster collaboration among themselves, and protect their common business interests. In total, Jinan had more than 10 meeting halls for traders from regions over the country. Over the years most of these buildings were either converted to serve other purposes, deteriorated, or were torn down. The meeting hall of the traders from Zhejiang (abbreviated as "Zhe" (浙) in the hall's Chinese name) and Fujian (abbreviated as "Min" (闽) in the hall's Chinese name) is the last existing meeting hall in Jinan. It was established in 1873 during the late Qing Dynasty by a trader from Fujian who also held a government office. Since losing its function as a meeting hall, the building has been used as a boarding house, a morgue, as storage for old books (1960's) and as a factory building (1970's). The building was declared a key historical site by the City of Jinan in 1979. On October 16, 2007, the renovated hall was reopen as a center where senior citizens can practice arts such as calligraphy and painting.

== Architectural layout ==
The meeting hall served as a gathering place on every major festival. On these occasions, the traders from Fujian and Zhejiang would use it for religious observances, to discuss business, to dine, and to attend theater performances.

The meeting hall has a wooden framework supported by large wooden pillars. Overall the building complex is about 80 meters deep and 30 meters wide. Its roof is covered with small green tiles. Originally, the hall had two gates, a north gate leading to the Kuan Hou Suo Alley and a south gate leading to the Southern Ma Dao Jie (now renamed to "Black Tiger Spring West Road"). The north gate has been closed off in 1956, since then, since then only the south gate is being used. The meeting hall has two main halls, one located directly behind the gate house of the southern entrance gate and the theater hall right to the north of it. The two halls are separated by a wooden screen that can be opened to create one big hall to accommodate large functions. The theater hall is supported by six pillars and consists of five half-open rooms. The stage (approximately 6 meters wide and 4 meters deep) is located to the north of the hall with seating areas arranged along the east, west, and south sides of the hall. Wooden staircases lead up to the first floor on the east and west sides of the hall. Behind the stage lies a small changing room for the actors.

== Location ==
The Zhejiang and Fujian Traders Meeting Hall is located in Lixia District, within the historical city center of Jinan, north of the southern city moat. It geographical coordinates are 36°39′45.72″N 117°1′30.00″E and its postal address is: Black Tiger Spring West Road Number 23 (Chinese: 黑虎泉西路23号; pinyin: Hēihǔ Quán Xīlù 23 hào), Lixia District, Jinan.

== See also ==
- List of sites in Jinan
