= Three Officials Temple Scenic Area =

Park in Jinan, Shandong, China

Coordinates: 36°43′19.31″N 117°01′27.35″E

The Three Officials Temple Scenic Area (Chinese: 三官庙景区; pinyin: Sānguānmiào Jǐngqū) is a public park located on the southern bank of the Yellow River near the city center of Jinan, Shandong, China. Within the park is the site of a former temple dedicated to three legendary rulers in ancient China. Two of the rulers, Yao and Shun belonged to the five emperors of the Three Sovereigns and Five Emperors. The third ruler commemorated by the temple was Yu the Great, who is venerated for having introduced flood control in China. The temple's foundation was triggered by flood damage to nearby Gaijiagou Village in 1882. The villagers collected money and by 1911, the temple had become a site of worship. It was destroyed in 1958 by a fire. Rebuilding of the site started in 1999, once again with donations from the inhabitants of Gaijiagou Village.

== See also ==
- Yellow River Forest Park
- Jinan Hundred Miles Yellow River Scenic Area
- List of sites in Jinan
