= Ming Hu Ju =

Theatre in Shandong, China

Coordinates: 36°40′23.5″N 117°01′40.8″E

The Ming Hu Ju (Chinese: 明湖居; pinyin: Míng Hú Jū; lit. '(Da)Ming Lake House') is a theater that features primarily traditional performing arts from Shandong. It is located on the southern shore of the Daming Lake and to the north of the historical center of the city of Jinan, Shandong, China. The theater has been in operation since the late Qing dynasty. It was established in 1890 and its founding is attributed to the local artist Guo Dani (郭大妮). Besides the theater proper, the Ming Hu Ju also functions as a tea house and a restaurant. The Ming Hu Ju is featured as a setting in the novel The Travels of Lao Can by Liu E.

== See also ==
- List of sites in Jinan
