= Zhuoying Spring =

Karst spring in Jinan, Shandong, China

Coordinates: 36°40′2.20″N 117°1′3.87″E

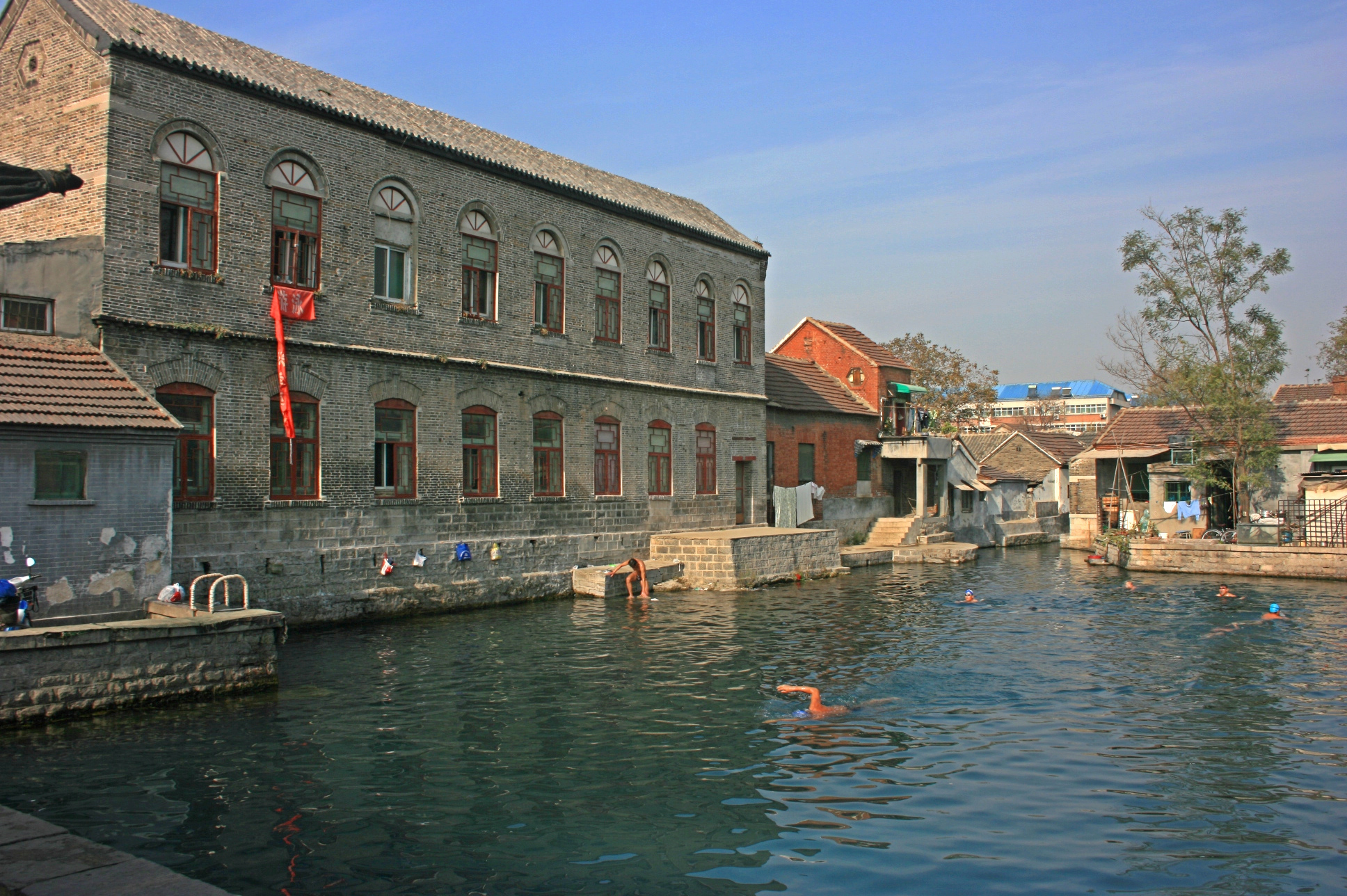
Palace Pool in November 2008

The Zhuoying Spring (Chinese: 濯缨泉; pinyin: Zhuóyīng Quán, literally "washing out the tassel spring") is a culturally significant artesian karst spring located in historical center of the city of Jinan, Shandong Province, China. It is listed among the 72 famous springs (Chinese: 七十二名泉; pinyin: Qīshí'èr Míng Quán) of Jinan (as number 19.). The spring forms a large spring pool, the Palace Pool (Chinese: 王府池子; pinyin: Wángfǔ Chízǐ), that is used as a public outdoor swimming pool.

The name "Zhuoying Spring" comes from a poem from Mencius, "Li Lou Shang" (Chinese: 离娄上; pinyin: Lí Lóu Shàng), that contains the phrase "wash out the tassel" (Chinese: 濯缨; pinyin: zhuó yīng).

When the army of the Jin dynasty invaded Jinan moving southward into the territory of the Southern Song dynasty, the local garrison commander, Guan Sheng (Chinese: 关胜; pinyin: Guān Shèng), refused to surrender. A bloody battle ensued and the soldiers washed the textile decorations of their lancets in the Palace Pool.

The name "Palace Pool" dates back to the time of the Ming dynasty, when the De Wang Palace (Chinese: 德王; pinyin: Dé Wáng) was constructed at the site and the spring pool was included into its grounds. Today, the pool lies in a historical residential neighborhood with private residences on the water edge.

== See also ==
- List of sites in Jinan
