= Five Lotus Spring =

Artesian karst spring located in the city of Jinan, Shandong Province, China

Coordinates: 36°39′43.75″N 117°1′30.94″E

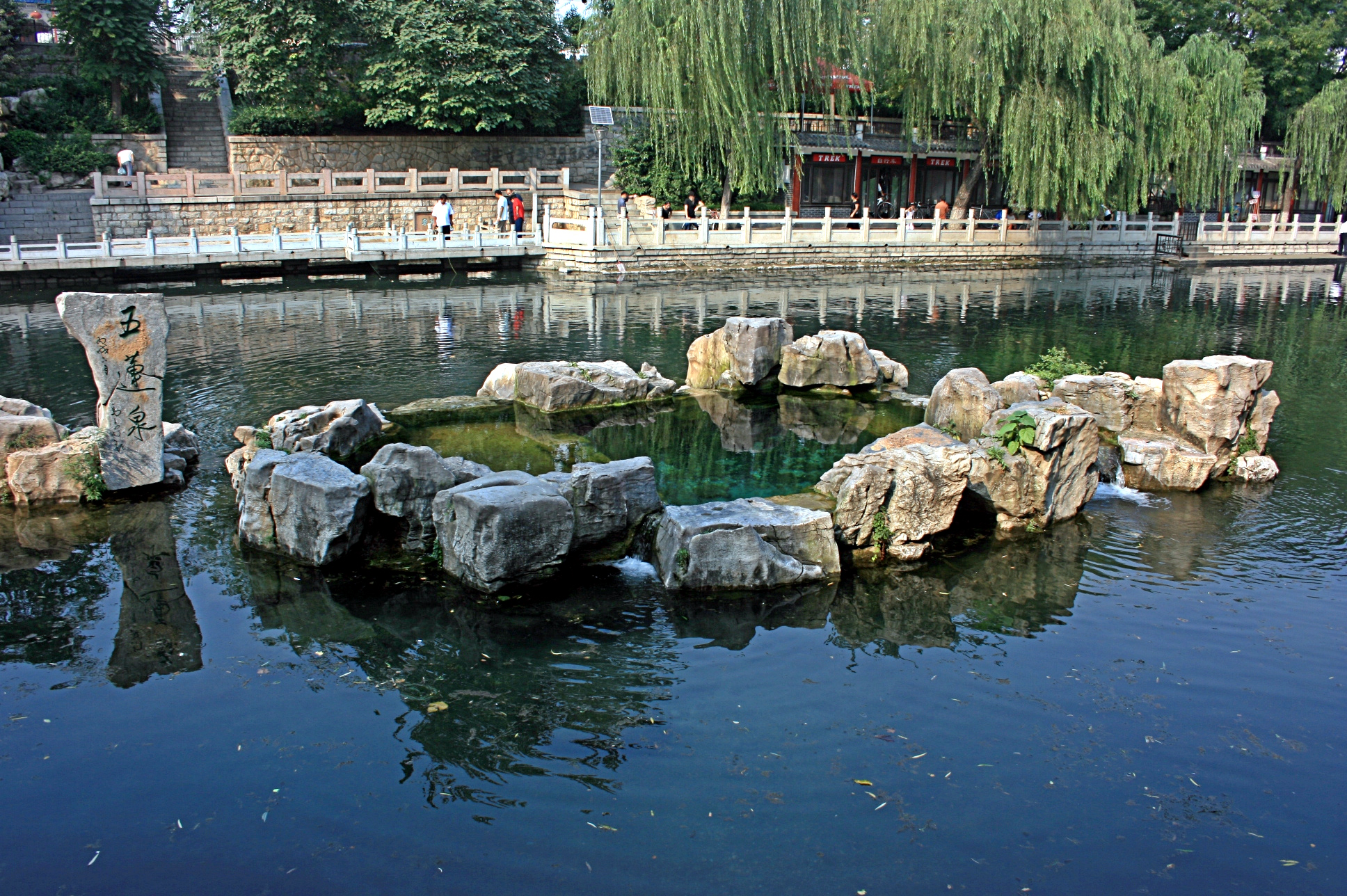
Five Lotus Spring

The Five Lotus Spring (Chinese: 五莲泉; pinyin: Wǔ Lián Quán) is an artesian karst spring located in the city of Jinan, Shandong Province, China. The spring is located in the old city moat to the southeast of the historical city centre. A spring pool with a water level above that of the moat is formed by an arrangement of natural rocks.

== See also ==
- List of sites in Jinan
