= White Cloud Lake =

Lake in Shandong, China

- Location within Shandong
- Location: Jinan, Shandong
- Coordinates: 36°51′19.13″N 117°23′17.01″E
- Basin countries: China
- Surface area: 17.4 km^{2} (6.7 sq mi)
- Average depth: 1 m (3 ft 3 in)

White Cloud Lake (Chinese: 白云湖; pinyin: Bái Yún Hú) is a lake in the county-level City of Zhangqiu, City of Jinan, Shandong Province, China. It is located about 35 kilometers to the east of the city center of Jinan proper, about halfway between Jinan and the City of Zibo, right to north of the Jiqing (Jinan -Qingdao) Expressway. White Cloud Lake is the third largest lake in Shandong Province.

== See also ==
- List of sites in Jinan
