= Jinan Hundred Miles Yellow River Scenic Area =

Park in Jinan, Shandong, China

Coordinates: 36°43′56.83″N 116°57′28.5″E

The Jinan Hundred Miles Yellow River Scenic Area (Chinese: 济南百里黄河风景区; pinyin: Jǐnán Bǎilǐ Huánghé Fēngjǐngqū) is a public park located on the southern bank of the Yellow River in the city of Jinan, Shandong, China. It covers an elongated strip of land between the second northern ring road around the city and the bank of the Yellow River. From within the park, the Yellow River can be crossed via the Luokou pontoon bridge. On the opposite bank of the river lies the Yellow River Forest Park.

== See also ==
- Yellow River Forest Park
- Three Officials Temple Scenic Area
- List of sites in Jinan
