= Church of the Immaculate Conception, Huzhuang =

Catholic church in Shandong, China

Coordinates: 36°14′26.22″N 116°25′51.96″E

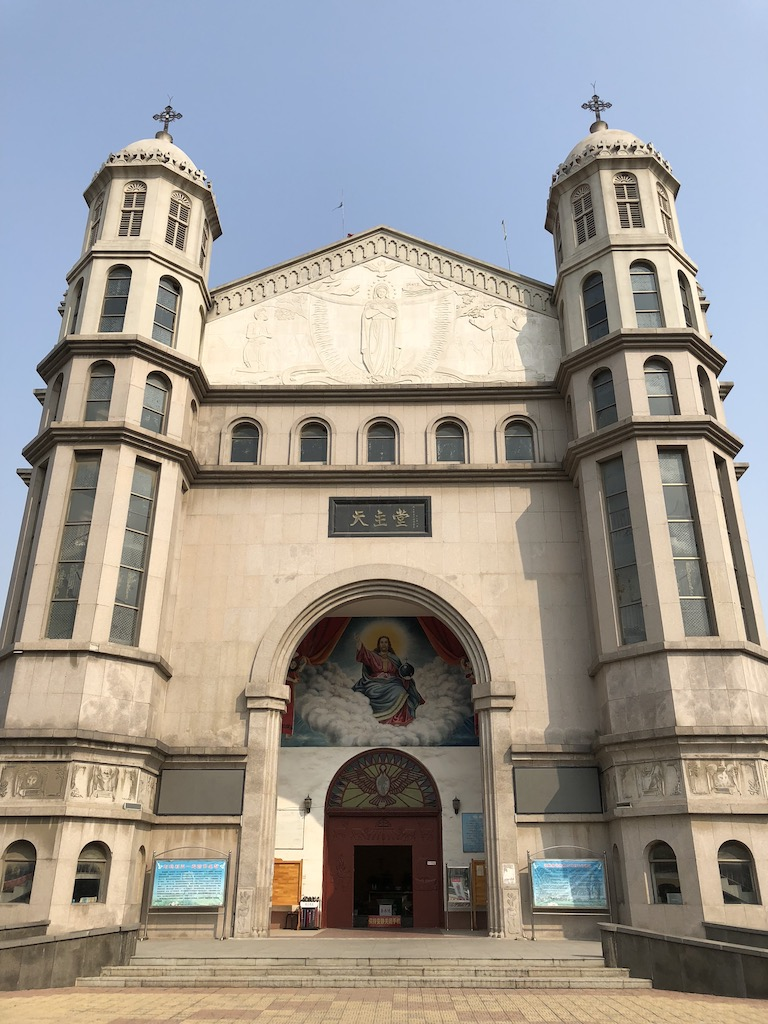
Huzhuang Church

The Church of the Immaculate Conception (Chinese: 无染原罪堂; pinyin: Wúrǎn Yuánzuì táng), in Huzhuang village, Pingyin county of Jinan, Shandong province, is a Catholic church registered with the Catholic Patriotic Association. It is popularly known as the Huzhuang Church (Chinese: 胡庄教堂; pinyin: Húzhuāng Jiàotáng) or Huzhuang Catholic Church (Chinese: 胡庄天主教堂; pinyin: Húzhuāng Tiānzhǔ Jiàotáng).

The church was designed in 1909 by a German priest, but was destroyed on Christmas Day in 1965. The current building was rebuilt in 1998. Along with the Church of Our Lady of Lourdes, atop a nearby hill, the Huzhuang Church receives about 100,000 pilgrims each year. The church is known for its Chinese Catholic folk music.

== See also ==
- List of sites in Jinan
