= Yellow River Forest Park (Jinan) =

Park in Jinan, Shandong, China

Coordinates: 36°43′44.01″N 116°59′27.53″E

The Yellow River Forest Park (Chinese: 黄河森林公园; pinyin: Huánghé Sēnlín Gōngyuán) is a public park located on the northern bank of the Yellow River in the city of Jinan, Shandong, China. It is connected to the southern bank of the Yellow River and hence the urban center of Jinan via the Luokou pontoon bridge. On the opposite bank of the river lie the Jinan Hundred Miles Yellow River Scenic Area and downstream the Three Officials Temple Scenic Area.

== See also ==
- Jinan Hundred Miles Yellow River Scenic Area
- Three Officials Temple Scenic Area
- List of sites in Jinan
