= Jinan Yellow River Bridge =

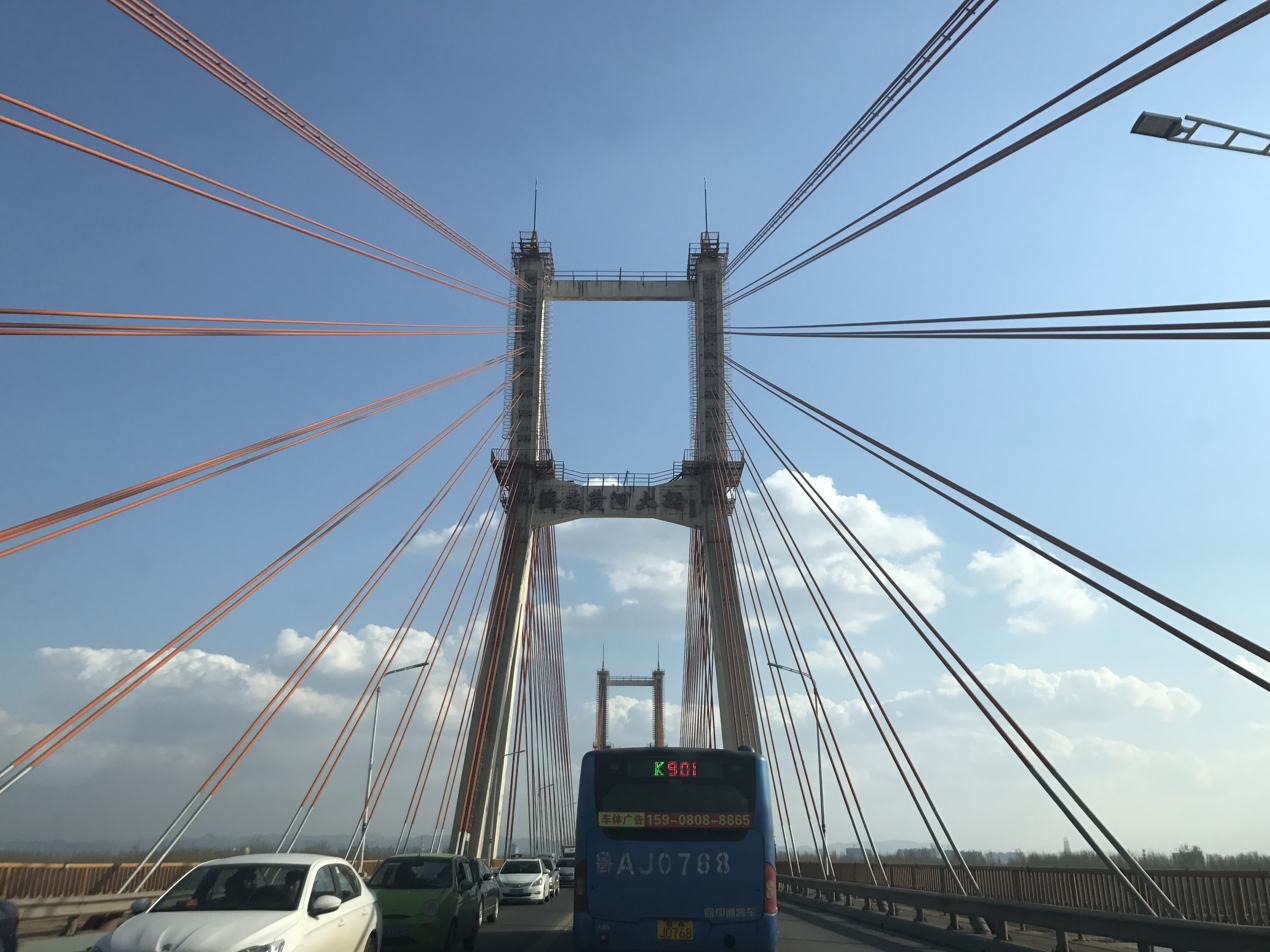
- Bridge in February 2017
- Coordinates: 36°45′23.49″N 117°1′54.54″E
- Carries: road and Beijing–Shanghai High-Speed Railway
- Crosses: Yellow River
- Locale: Jinan, Shandong
- Official name: Chinese: 济南黄河大桥; pinyin: Jǐnán Huánghé Dà Qiáo

Characteristics
- Design: cable-stayed, semi-fan arrangement, H-pylons
- Material: Pylons: reinforced concrete, cables: steel
- Total length: 488 metres (1,601 ft)
- Width: total: 19.5 metres (64 ft), deck: 17.2 metres (56 ft)
- Height: 68.4 metres (224 ft) (pylons)
- Longest span: 220 metres (720 ft)
- No. of spans: 5
- Piers in water: 4

History
- Designer: Li Shou and Wan Shanshan, Communication Planning and Design Institute of Shandong Province
- Construction start: December 15th, 1978
- Construction end: June 30th, 1982
- Opened: July 14th, 1982

Statistics
- Daily traffic: 14,179 vehicles (1990)
- Toll: expressway toll

Location
- Interactive map of Jinan Yellow River Bridge

The Jinan Yellow River Bridge (Chinese: 济南黄河大桥; pinyin: Jǐnán Huánghé Dà Qiáo), also known as the Jinan Yellow River Highway Bridge (Chinese: 济南黄河公路桥; pinyin: Jǐnán Huánghé Gōnglù Qiáo), is a cable-stayed road bridge across the Yellow River in the city of Jinan, Shandong Province, China.

The national State Planning Commission authorized the plan to construct the Jinan Yellow River bridge on December 10, 1977. In February 1978, engineers Li Shou (Chinese: 李守; pinyin: Lǐ Shǒu) and Wan Shanshan (Chinese: 万珊珊; pinyin: Wàn Shānshān) from the Communication Planning and Design Institute of Shandong Province started to work on the design. In September of the same year, the preliminary design was approved by the Shandong Province construction committee. Test boring at the construction site commenced in July 1978. Work on the bridge proper started officially on December 15, 1978, the bridge assembly was in place by December 1981, and construction was completed on June 30, 1982. Work was carried out by the Communication Engineering Company of Shandong Province. It was supervised by assistant directors Song Ren and Wang Liang as well as assistant commissioner Du Henggan from the department of transportation. The bridge was opened to traffic on July 14, 1982. It was one of the first long-span cable-stayed road bridges in China. The total construction cost was 35,180,000 Yuan RMB. By 1990, the daily average traffic volume had reached 14,179 vehicles (for a 24 hour period).

The bridge design has a semi-fan arrangement with steel cables and reinforced concrete H-pylons. The bridge has a total of five spans with the lengths: 40 metres (130 ft) - 94 metres (308 ft) - 220 metres (720 ft) - 94 metres (308 ft) - 20 metres (66 ft). The deck is 17.2 metres (56 ft) wide and 2.75 metres (9 ft 0 in) deep. The pylons are 68.4 metres (224 ft) tall. Together with the access ramps, the bridge has a total length of 2,022.8 metres (6,636 ft).

== See also ==
- List of sites in Jinan
