= Tomb of Zhang Yanghao =

Coordinates: 36°42′19.37″N 117°2′35.79″E

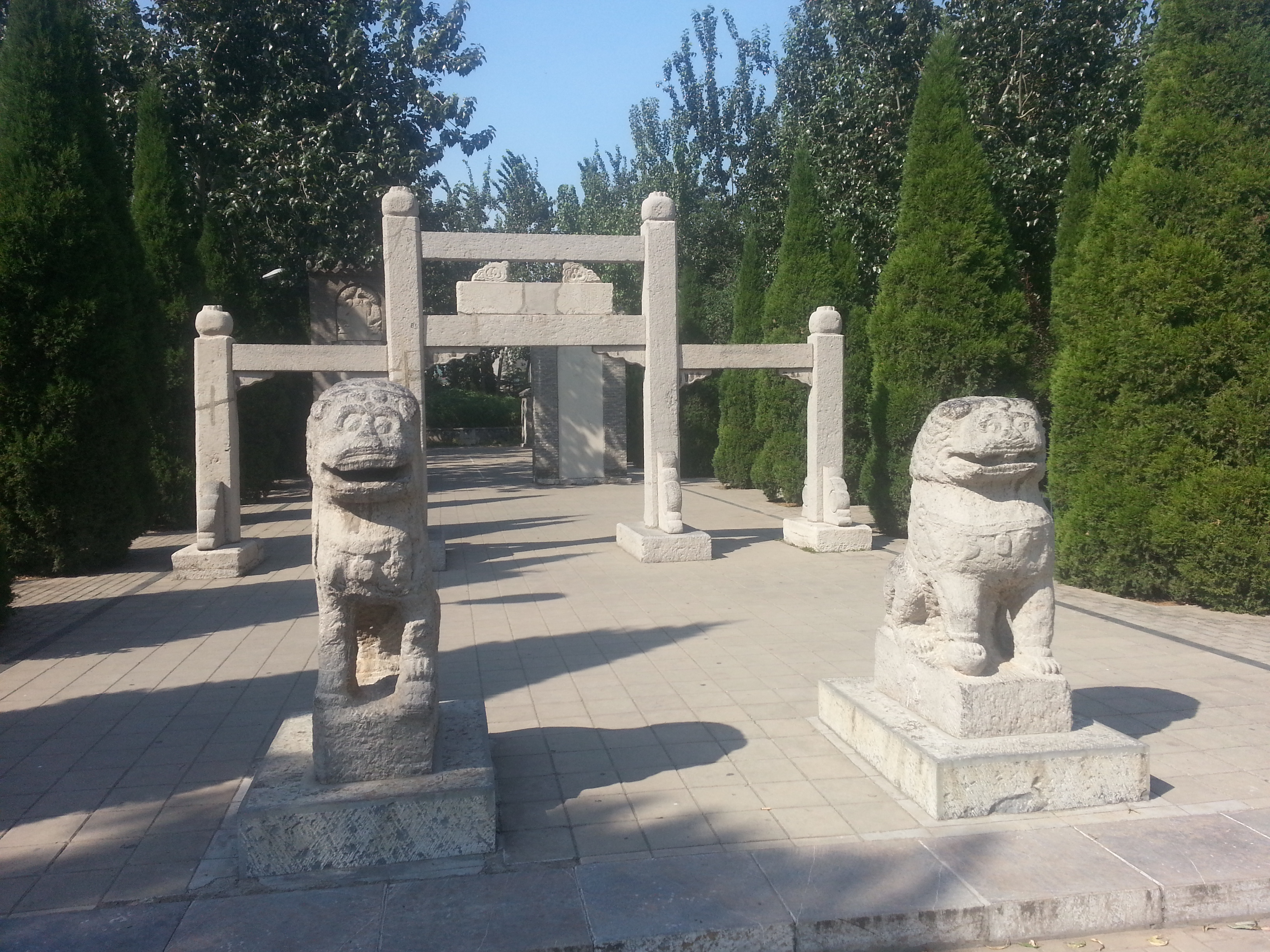
Spirit way of the tomb.

The Tomb of Zhang Yanghao (Chinese: 张养浩墓; pinyin: Zhāng Yǎnghào Mù) also known as the Grave of Lord Zhang (Chinese: 张公坟; pinyin: Zhāng Gōng Fén) is a monument to the Yuan-Dynasty Sanqu poet Zhang Yanghao. It is located in a public park in Liu Yun Village (柳云村) within the urban area of Tianqiao District in the city of Jinan, Shandong, China.

The tomb's park covers an area of about 2,000 square meters and is planted with pines and willows. In addition to the tomb of Zhang Yanghao himself, it also contains the tombs of four of Zhang's relatives. The tomb of Zhang Yanghao consists of an earth mound that is 1.9 meters tall and surrounded by masonry walls. In front of the mound stand a stone altar and incense set. A spirit way with stone gates, lions, and turtles leads to the tomb.

The tomb has been inscribed into the list of protected cultural sites in Shandong (Chinese: 山东省文物保护单位; pinyin: Shāndōng shěng wénwù bǎohù dānwèi) since June 1992 (number 2-246).

== See also ==
- List of sites in Jinan
- Major historical and cultural sites protected by Shandong Province
