= Zhujiayu =

Zhujiayu 朱家峪村
- Village
- Location in Shandong
- Coordinates: 36°39′39″N 117°35′29″E
- Country: People's Republic of China
- Province: Shandong
- Sub-provincial city: Jinan
- District: Zhangqiu
- Subdistrict: Guanzhuang

Zhujiayu (Chinese: 朱家峪; pinyin: Zhūjiā Yù; lit. 'Zhu Home Valley') is a village in Guanzhuang Subdistrict (官庄街道), Zhangqiu, Jinan, Shandong Province, China that is renowned for the preservation of its historical buildings dating to the Ming and Qing Dynasties. The village is located about 45 km to the east of the provincial capital Jinan and falls under the administration of the county-level city of Zhangqiu.
