= List of Major National Historical and Cultural Sites in Shandong =

This list is of Major Sites Protected for their Historical and Cultural Value at the National Level in Shandong Province, China.

Site	Chinese name	Location	Designation	Image
Xiaotang Mountain Han Shrine	Xiaotangshan Guoshi mu shici 孝堂山郭氏墓石祠	Jinan	1-54	Upload file
Stone Carvings of the Wu Family Tombs	Jiaxiang Wu shi muqun shike 嘉祥武氏墓群石刻	Jiaxiang County	1-55	Upload file
Four Gates Pagoda	Simen ta 四门塔	36°27′03″N 117°07′47″E Jinan	1-62	Upload file
Qufu Temple of Confucius and Kong Family Mansion	Qufu Kongmiao ji Kongfu 曲阜孔庙及孔府	35°35′48″N 116°59′03″E Qufu	1-99	Upload file
Chengziya	Chengziya yizhi 城子崖遗址	36°44′09″N 117°21′15″E Zhangqiu	1-140	Upload file
Linzi, Capital of the Qi State	Linzi Qiguo gucheng 临淄齐国故城	Zibo	1-144	Upload file
Capital of the Lu State in Qufu	Qufu Luguo gucheng 曲阜鲁国故城	Qufu	1-145	Upload file
Cemetery of Confucius	Konglin 孔林	35°37′07″N 116°59′11″E Qufu	1-163	Upload file
Lingyan Temple	Lingyan si 灵岩寺	36°21′53″N 116°58′47″E Jinan	2-21	Upload file
Penglai Water City and Penglai Pavilion	Penglai shuicheng ji Penglai ge 蓬莱水城及蓬莱阁	Penglai	2-37	Upload file
Dawenkou site	Dawenkou yizhi 大汶口遗址	Tai'an	2-48	Upload file
Liugong Island memorial of the First Sino-Japanese War	Liugongdao Jiawu zhanzheng jinian di 刘公岛甲午战争纪念地	Weihai	3-9	Upload file
Tomb of Feng Yuxiang	Feng Yuxiang mu 冯玉祥墓	Tai'an	3-39	Upload file
Tuoshan Caves	Tuoshan shiku 驼山石窟	36°38′55″N 118°27′28″E Qingzhou	3-46	Upload file
Thousand-Buddha Cliff Rock Sculptures (including Dragon-and-Tiger Pagoda and Nine Pinnacle Pagoda)	Qianfo ya zaoxiang 千佛崖造像 (包括龙虎塔、九顶塔)	Jinan	3-48	Upload file
Guangyue Lou	Guangyue lou 光岳楼	Liaocheng	3-65	Upload file
Shanshan Assembly Hall in Liaocheng	Liaocheng Shanshan huiguan 聊城山陕会馆	Liaocheng	3-77	Upload file
Mencius Temple, Mencius Residence, Mencius Forest	Mengmiao, Mengfu he Menglin 孟庙、孟府和孟林	35°28′42″N 117°02′56″E Zoucheng	3-83	Upload file
Mou Family Estate	Mou shi zhuangyuan 牟氏庄园	Qixia	3-92	Upload file
Shihu Garden	Shihu yuan 十笏园	Weifang	3-95	Upload file
Dai Miao	Dai miao 岱庙	36°15′21″N 117°06′27″E Tai'an	3-125	Upload file
Iron Pagoda of Chongjue Temple	Chongjue si tieta 崇觉寺铁塔	Jining	3-146	Upload file
Rock Carvings of Yunfengshan and Tianzhushan	Yunfeng shan, Tianzhu shan moya shike 云峰山、天柱山摩崖石刻	Laizhou	3-170	Upload file
Rock Carvings of Tieshan and Gangshan	Tieshan, Gangshan moya shike 铁山、岗山摩崖石刻	Zoucheng	3-171	Upload file
Xuecheng Site	Xuecheng yizhi 薛城遗址	Tengzhou	3-202	Upload file
Tian Qi Mausoleums	Tian Qi wang ling 田齐王陵	Zibo	3-232	Upload file
Tomb of the King of Sulu	Sulu wang mu 苏禄王墓	Dezhou	3-252	Upload file
Beizhuang Site	Beizhuang yizhi 北庄遗址	Changdao County	4-10	Upload file
Dantu site	Dantu yizhi 丹土遗址	Wulian County	4-11	Upload file
Tomb of Cao Zhi	Cao Zhi mu 曹植墓	Dong'e County	4-67	Upload file
Main Hall of Guangrao Guandi Temple	Guangrao Guandi miao dadian 广饶关帝庙大殿	Guangrao County	4-106	Upload file
Wei Family Residence	Wei shi zhuangyuan 魏氏庄园	Huimin County	4-173	Upload file
Ding Family Residence	Ding shi guzhai 丁氏故宅	Longkou	4-174	Upload file
Fujian Guildhall in Yantai	Yantai Fujian huiguan 烟台福建会馆	Yantai	4-205	Upload file
German Architecture of Qingdao	Qingdao Deguo zhujian 青岛德国建筑	Qingdao	4-206	Upload file
Headquarters of the 115th Division of the Eight Route Army	Balujun yiyiwu shisi lingbu jiuzhi 八路军一一五师司令部旧址	Junan County	4-244	Upload file
Xihe site	Xihe yizhi 西河遗址	Zhangqiu	5-58	Upload file
Tonglin site	Tonglin yizhi 桐林遗址	Zibo	5-59	Upload file
Dinggong site	Dinggong yizhi 丁公遗址	Zouping County	5-60	Upload file
Jingyanggang site	Jingyanggang yizhi 景阳岗遗址	Yanggu County	5-61	Upload file
Gudui Site in Anqiu	Anqiu Gudui yizhi 安邱堌堆遗址	Heze	5-62	Upload file
Jimo ruins	Jimo gucheng yizhi 即墨故城遗址	Pingdu	5-63	Upload file
Tomb of the Jibei King	Han Jibei wang mu 汉济北王墓	Jinan	5-168	Upload file
Beizhai Tombs	Beizhai muqun 北寨墓群	Yinan County	5-169	Upload file
Tombs of Han dynasty Kings of Lu	Han Lu wang mu 汉鲁王墓	Qufu	5-170	Upload file
Yan Temple	Yan miao 颜庙	35°36′03″N 116°59′19″E Qufu	5-336	Upload file
Linqing Customs Office	Linqing yunhe chaoguan 临清运河钞关	Linqing	5-337	Upload file
Great Wall of Qi	Qi changcheng yizhi 齐长城遗址	36°20′40″N 116°37′51″E Jinan, Zhangqiu, Feicheng, Tai'an, Laiwu, Zibo, Yiyuan County, Linqu County, Anqiu, Zhucheng, Yishui County, Ju County, Wulian County, Jiaonan, Qingdao	5-442(1)	Upload file
Stone Carvings of Taishan	Taishan shike 泰山石刻	36°15′21″N 117°06′27″E Tai'an	5-454	Upload file
Baifoshan Grottoes	Baifoshan shiku zaoxiang 白佛山石窟造像	Dongping County	5-455	Upload file
Badaguan	Qingdao Badaguan jindai jianzhu 青岛八大关近代建筑	Qingdao	5-492	Upload file
Yiyuan Man site	Yiyuan yuanren yizhi 沂源猿人遗址	Yiyuan County	6-104	Upload file
Beixin site	Beixin yizhi 北辛遗址	Tengzhou	6-105	Upload file
Wangyin site	Wangyin yizhi 王因遗址	Yanzhou	6-106	Upload file
Jiabai site	Jiabai yizhi 贾柏遗址	Wenshang County	6-107	Upload file
Xiaojingshan site	Xiaojingshan yizhi 小荆山遗址	Zhangqiu	6-108	Upload file
Dongyueshi site	Dongyueshi yizhi 东岳石遗址	Pingdu	6-109	Upload file
Baishicun site	Baishi cun yizhi 白石村遗址	Yantai	6-110	Upload file
Liangchengzhen site	Liangchengzhen yizhi 两城镇遗址	Rizhao	6-111	Upload file
Yaowangcheng site	Yaowangcheng yizhi 尧王城遗址	Rizhao	6-112	Upload file
Donghaiyu site	Donghaiyu yizhi 东海峪遗址	Rizhao	6-113	Upload file
Houli site	Houli yizhi 后李遗址	Zibo	6-114	Upload file
Sanlihe site	Sanlihe yizhi 三里河遗址	Jiaozhou	6-115	Upload file
Fujia site	Fujia yizhi 傅家遗址	Guangrao County	6-116	Upload file
Jiaochangpu site	Jiaochangpu yizhi 教场铺遗址	Chiping County	6-117	Upload file
Guicheng site	Guicheng chengzhi 归城城址	Longkou	6-118	Upload file
Tan State ruins	Tanguo gucheng 郯国故城	Tancheng County	6-119	Upload file
Zhu State ruins	Zhuguo gucheng 邾国故城	Zoucheng	6-120	Upload file
Biyang State ruins	Biyang gucheng 偪阳故城	Zaozhuang	6-121	Upload file
Dongpingling ruins	Dongpingling gucheng 东平陵故城	Zhangqiu	6-122	Upload file
Zhongchenhao kiln site	Zhongchenhao yao zhi 中陈郝窑址	Zaozhuang	6-123	Upload file
Longhua Temple ruins	Longhua si yizhi 龙华寺遗址	Boxing County	6-124	Upload file
Zhaili Kiln site	Zhaili yao zhi 寨里窑址	Zibo	6-125	Upload file
Zuiziqian Tombs	Zuiziqian muqun 嘴子前墓群	Haiyang	6-256	Upload file
Xiaowangzhuang Tombs	Xiaowangzhuang muqun 萧王庄墓群	Jining	6-257	Upload file
Xiyanchi Tombs	Xiyanchi muqun 洗砚池墓群	Linyi	6-258	Upload file
Tomb of Cui Fen	Cui Fen mu 崔芬墓	Linqu County	6-259	Upload file
Han Family Cemetery	Hanshi jiazu mudi 韩氏家族墓地	Shen County	6-260	Upload file
Tombs of Ming Princes of Lu	Ming Lu wang mu 明鲁王墓	Zoucheng	6-261	Upload file
Bian Bridge	Bianqiao 卞桥	Sishui County	6-613	Upload file
Iron Pagoda of Longxing Temple	Longxing si tieta 隆兴寺铁塔	Liaocheng	6-614	Upload file
Yan Wenjiang Temple	Yan Wenjiang ci 颜文姜祠	Zibo	6-615	Upload file
Old Architecture of Mount Tai	Taishan gu jianzhu qun 泰山古建筑群	36°15′21″N 117°06′27″E Tai'an	6-616	Upload file
Zeng Temple	Zeng miao 曾庙	Jiaxiang County	6-617	Upload file
Mount Ni Confucian Temple and Academy	Nishan Kongmiao he shuyuan 尼山孔庙和书院	35°30′11″N 117°13′02″E Qufu	6-618	Upload file
Dongda Temple, Jining	Jining Dongda si 济宁东大寺	Jining	6-619	Upload file
Former Residence of Pu Songling	Pu Songling guzhai 蒲松龄故宅	Zibo	6-620	Upload file
Xitian Temple sculptures	Xitian si zaoxiang 西天寺造像	Zibo	6-832	Upload file
Hongdingshan Cliffs	Hongdingshan moya 洪顶山摩崖	Dongping County	6-833	Upload file
Shengjingshan Cliffs	Shengjingshan moya 圣经山摩崖	Wendeng	6-834	Upload file
Sacred Heart Cathedral	Hongjialou tianzhu jiaotang 洪家楼天主教堂	36°41′09″N 117°03′34″E Jinan	6-976	Upload file
Tsingtao Brewery	Qingdao pijiuchang zaoqi jianzhu 青岛啤酒厂早期建筑	Qingdao 青岛市	6-977	Upload file
Former Residence of Wang Jinmei	Wang Jinmei guju 王尽美故居	Zhucheng	6-978	Upload file
Architecture of Yantaishan	Yantai shan jindai jianzhu qun 烟台山近代建筑群	Yantai	6-979	Upload file
Red Swastika Society site	Wanzihui jiuzhi 万字会旧址	Jinan	6-980	Upload file
Battlefield of the Battle of Taierzhuang	Tai'erzhuang dazhan jiuzhi 台儿庄大战旧址	34°33′26″N 117°43′51″E Zaozhuang	6-981	Upload file

== See also ==
- Major historical and cultural sites protected by Shandong Province
- Principles for the Conservation of Heritage Sites in China
