= Xiaotang Mountain Han Shrine =

Shrine in Shandong, China

Coordinates: 36°24′35.46″N 116°36′56.52″E

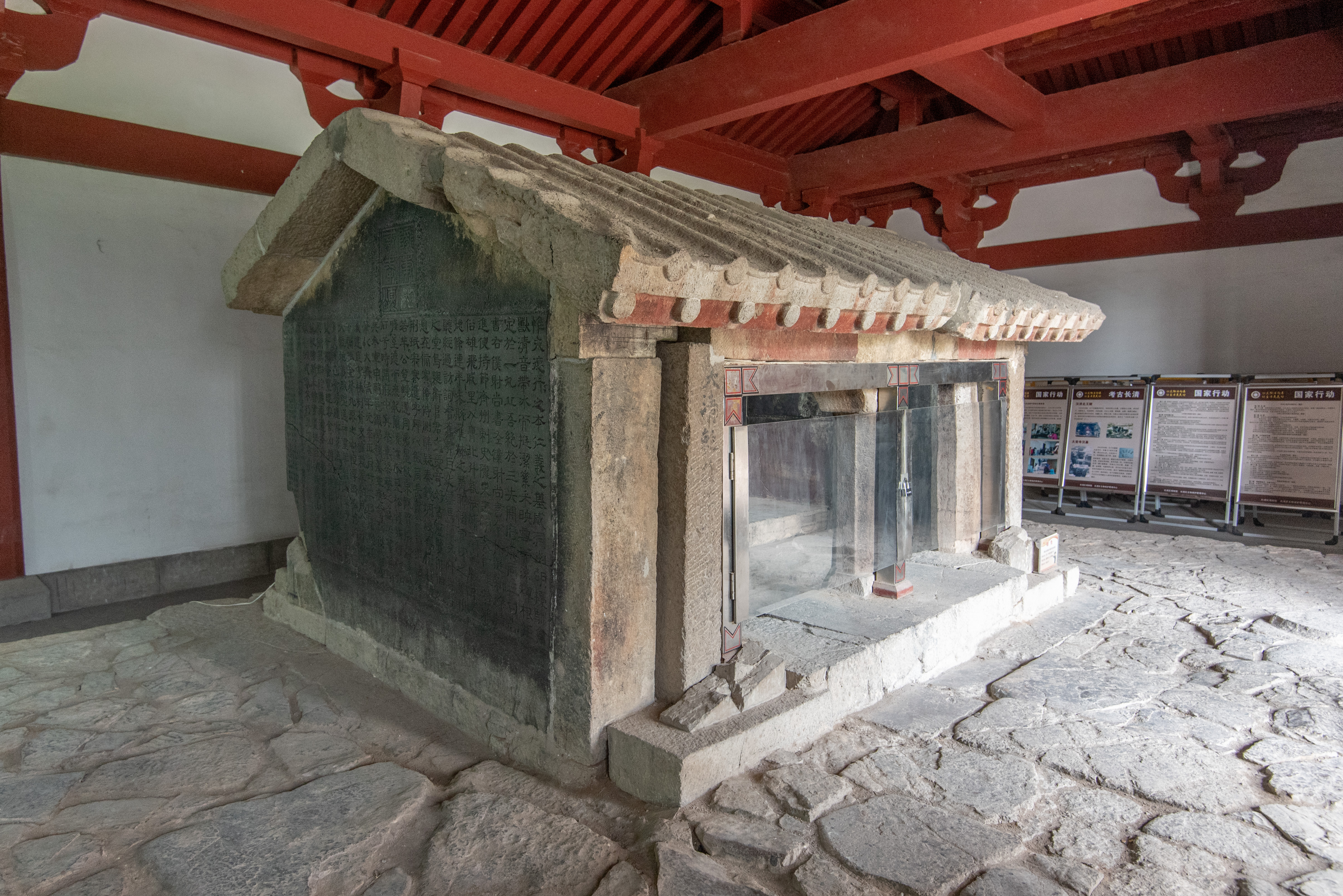
The Xiaotang Mountain Han Shrine

The Xiaotang Mountain Han Shrine (Chinese: 孝堂山汉墓祠; pinyin: Xiàotáng Shān Hàn Mù Cí) also known as the Guo Family Ancestral Hall (Chinese: 孝堂山郭氏墓石祠; pinyin: Xiàotángshān Guō Shì Mù Shí Cí, literally "Xiaotang Mountain Guo Family Tomb Stone Ancestral Hall") is a funerary stone shrine from the early Eastern Han dynasty (25–220 AD) situated on slopes of the Yellow River valley in the western part of Shandong Province, China. It is the only known offering shrine from this period known to be still standing in its original form. The Xiaotang Mountain Shrine has been identified with as the Guo family shrine by some studies, linking it to the story of Guo Ju, the 13th of the Confucian Twenty-four Filial Exemplars.

== History ==
Funerary shrines have been built on top of the tombs of members of the upper nobility and feudal lords since the Warring States period (475–221 BC). Erecting such shrines as well as monumental towers became popular during the times of the Han dynasty (207 BC – 220 AD) and in particular in the era of the Eastern Han dynasty (25–220 AD). The Xiaotang Mountain Han Shrine dates to the early Eastern Han dynasty, but the exact date remains unknown. Historical inscriptions that were added to the shrine suggest that it dates back before the year 129 AD (the 4th year of the reign of the Eastern Han Emperor Shun of Han), to which the earliest inscription on the shrine is dated. The second oldest inscription date is the year when Emperor Huan of Han of the Eastern Han changed his era name to "Yongkang" (Chinese: 永康; pinyin: Yǒngkāng, in 167 AD). The shrine is mentioned in the Commentary to the River Classic by the Northern Wei dynasty scholar Li Daoyuan (died 527 AD). The shrine is also recorded in the Catalogue of Inscriptions on Stone and Bone by Zhao Mingcheng (1081–1129 AD), a scholar-official and epigraphist in the Song dynasty also known for being the husband to poet Li Qingzhao. The shrine was among the first 180 sites to be included in the List of Major National Historical and Cultural Sites on April 3, 1961.

== Shrine ==
The Xiaotang Mountain Han Shrine is a free-standing masonry construction topped by a single-eaved and hanging hill-shaped roof. It that stands 4.14 metres (13.6 ft) long, 2.5 metres (8 ft 2 in) wide, and 2.64 metres (8 ft 8 in) tall. The walls are made from black stones and are 20 centimetres (7.9 in) thick. An 86 centimetres (34 in)-tall octagonal stone pillar has been placed in the center of the shrine. The shrine is decorated with sunken images cut away from a surface as well as bas-relief images. The stone walls and the triangular stone girders are engraved with depictions of legendary tales, historic events, time keeping and astrology, royal audiences, travel, guest receptions, war campaigns, hunting, cooking, and recreation. Other architectural components of the shrine carry simpler decorations with motives such as lowered curtains and water chestnut. An inscription of particular cultural history and calligraphic value is the Odes to Moving Filial Piety (隴東王感孝頌) written by King of Longdong in the Northern Qi dynasty (550–577 AD) and engraved on the outside gable of the shrine.

== Filial piety ==
The shrine has been identified with the story of Guo Ju (Chinese: 郭巨; pinyin: Guō Jù), the 13th of the Twenty-four Filial Exemplars. Guo Ju is said to have lived during the time of the Han dynasty. He prepared to bury his own infant son during a period of food shortage in order to preserve enough food to save his aging mother. When he dug the grave for his son, he found a treasure (inscribed as a gift to him) that allowed him to save his entire family.

== Location ==
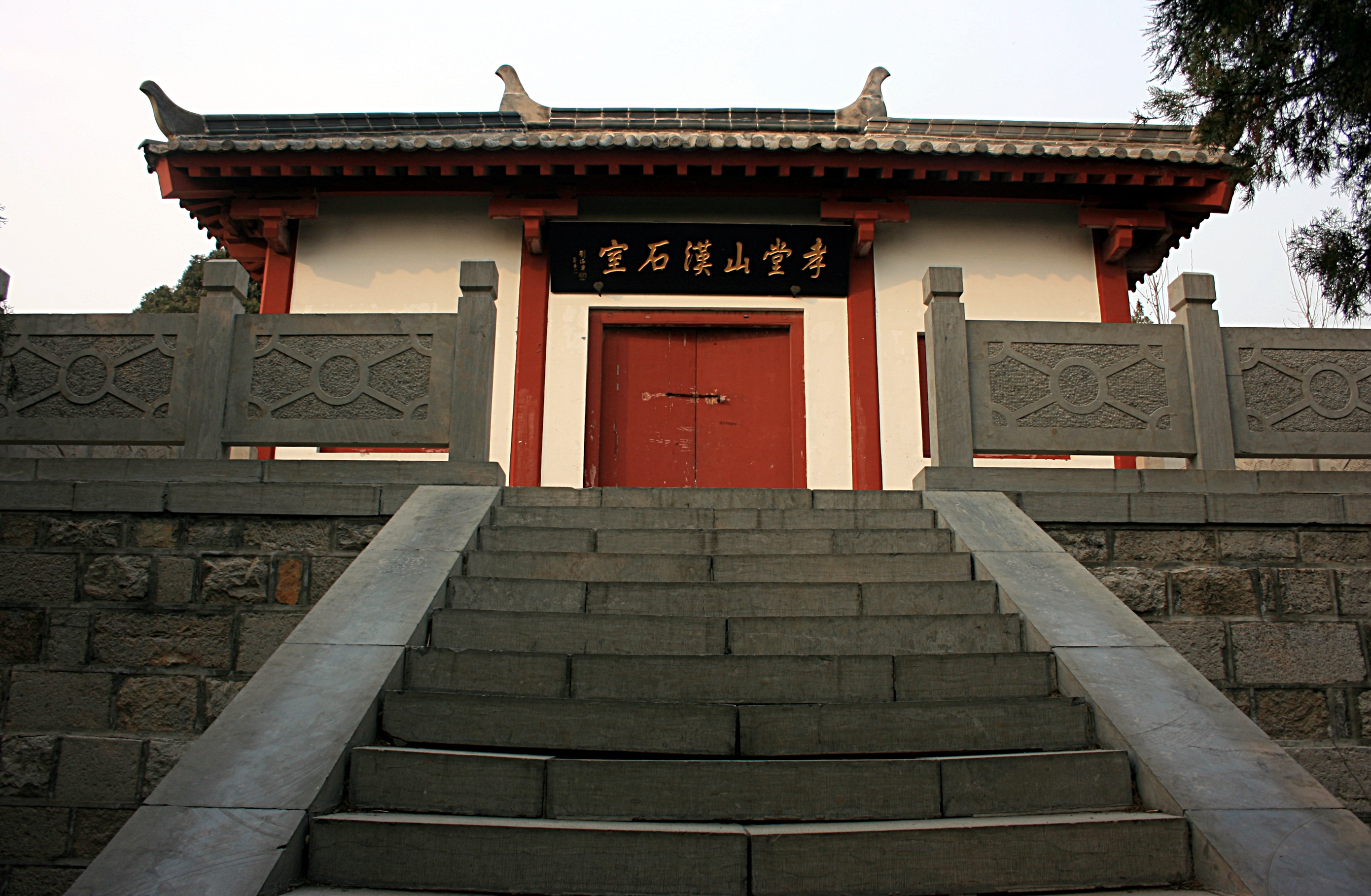
Entrance gate building of the shrine complex

The Xiaotang Mountain Han Shrine is located on Xiaotang Mountain (Chinese: 孝堂山; pinyin: Xiàotáng Shān, literally "Filial Piety Hall Mountain"). Other names of the mountain are "Guishan" (Chinese: 亀山; pinyin: Guīshān, literally "Tortoise Mountain") and "Wushan" (Chinese: 巫山; pinyin: Wūshān, literally "Witch Mountain"). The mountain is located south of the village of Xiaolipu (Chinese: 孝里铺; pinyin: Xiàolǐpù), in Changqing District of Jinan, about 20 kilometres (12 mi) southwest of the city center of Jinan. It is located about 500 metres (1,600 ft) to the east of the Yellow River and about 2 kilometres (1.2 mi) west of road G220.

== See also ==
- List of sites in Jinan
