= Nine Pinnacle Pagoda =

Location in Shandong, China

Twin Pagodas
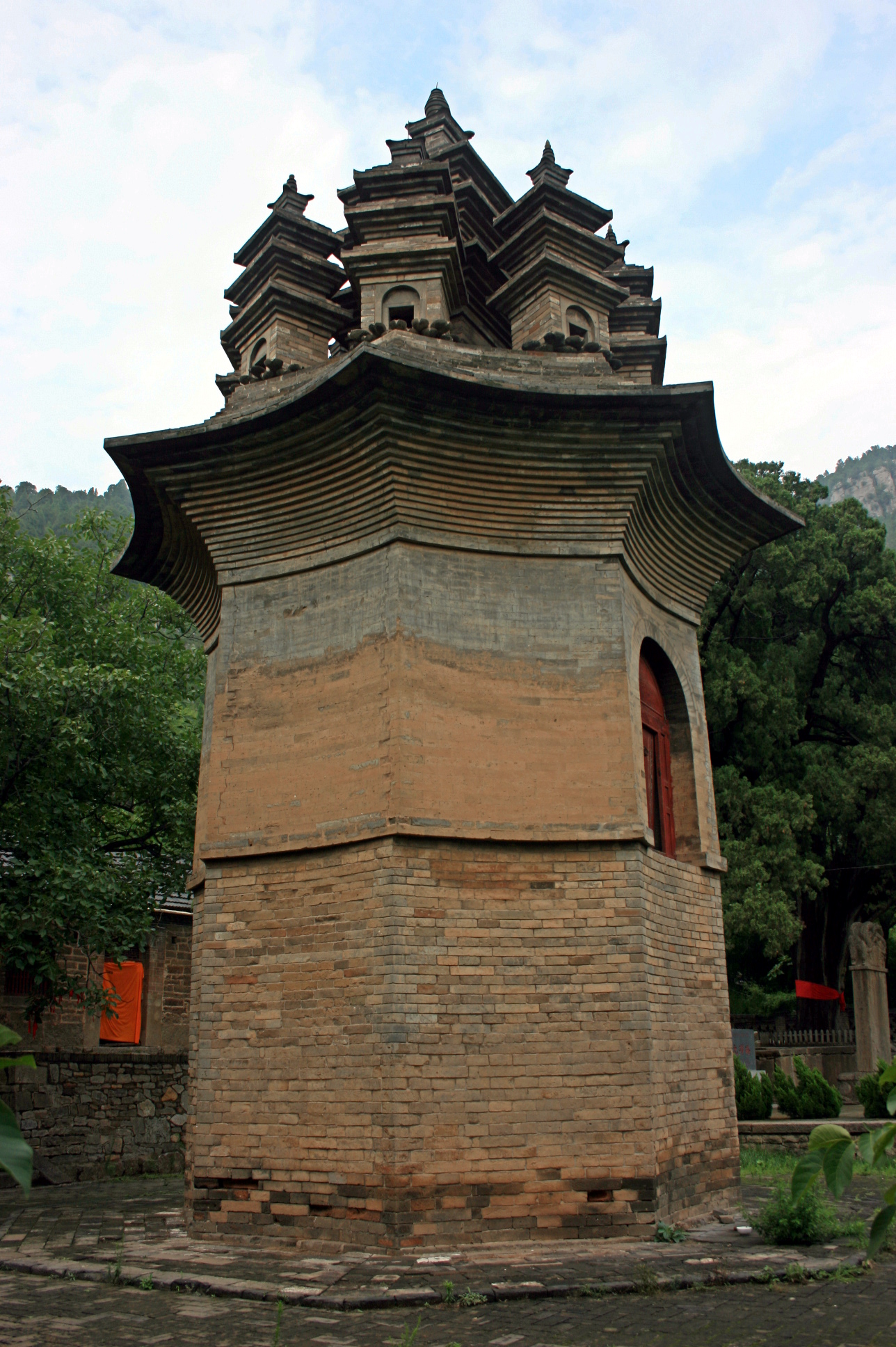
- Nine Pinnacle Pagoda

- Location in Shandong Nine Pinnacle Pagoda (China)

Religion
- Affiliation: Buddhism

Location
- Location: Qinjiazhuang Village, Liubu Town, in Licheng District, Shandong Province, China
- Country: China
- Coordinates: 36°25′15.62″N 117°7′49.73″E

The Nine Pinnacle Pagoda or Jiuding Pagoda (Chinese: 九顶塔; pinyin: Jiǔdǐng Tǎ, sometimes translated as "Nine Roof Pagoda") is an 8th-century pavilion-style brick pagoda located in central Shandong Province, China. It is noted for its unique roof design featuring nine small pagodas.

== Location ==
The Nine Pinnacle Pagoda is located near Qinjiazhuang Village, Liubu Town, in Licheng District, under the administration of Jinan City, about 33 kilometers southeast of the city of Jinan proper.

== History ==
The pagoda was erected during the Tang dynasty between the years 742 and 756 AD. The pagoda is made entirely from bricks laid tightly with joint gaps of about one centimeter. The pagoda's floor plan is an equilateral octagon in which all of the eight side walls are curved inwards. These concave walls are another distinguishing feature not found in other pagodas of the period. The main body of the pagoda contains only a single storey and the most elaborate feature of the structure are nine small pagodas that decorate the roof. This design may have been chosen to reflect the Chinese saying derived from a story of the Warring States period which reads: One word, nine ding vessels (Chinese: 一言, 九鼎; pinyin: yī yán, jiǔ dǐng). The saying means that a promise given carries a lot of weight (like the literal weight of the nine heavy ding vessels).

The name of the pagoda (Chinese: 九顶; pinyin: Jiǔdǐng) has the same pronunciation as the second half of the saying, although the characters for "ding" meaning "pinnacle" (顶) and "ding" meaning "ding vessel" (鼎) are not the same. Each of the roof pagodas has a square cross-section, three eaved storeys, and features a small door. Eight of the nine roof pagodas are positioned over the eight corners of the main body's octagon with their doors oriented outwards.

The height of these roof pagodas is 2.84 meters each. The ninth pagoda occupies the center of the roof. It is almost twice as large as its peers (5.33 meters) and its single door faces south. Including these roof decorations, the total height of the pagoda is 13.36 meters. The eaves of the pagoda are made from 17 layers of brick as is characteristic for the period. The pagoda stands on the grounds of the Nine Pagoda (Chinese: 九塔; pinyin: Jiǔ Tǎ) Temple. A change in the appearance of the walls of the pagoda near the middle of the main body (at 3.6 meters above ground) is seen as an indication that the lower half of the pagoda may have been formerly surrounded by another structure. The arched entrance door to the pagoda's main storey is located right above this transition. It leads to a chamber which houses a 1.2-meter tall Buddha statue made from stone and executed the style of the Tang dynasty. There are also statues of two monks. On the wall of the chamber a few traces of Buddhist murals remain.

The Nine Pinnacle Pagoda has been integrated into the grounds of the "Jiuding Pagoda Park of Folk Customs" (Chinese: 九顶塔民族风情园; pinyin: Jiǔdǐngtǎ Mínzú Fēngqíng Yuán).

== Image gallery ==
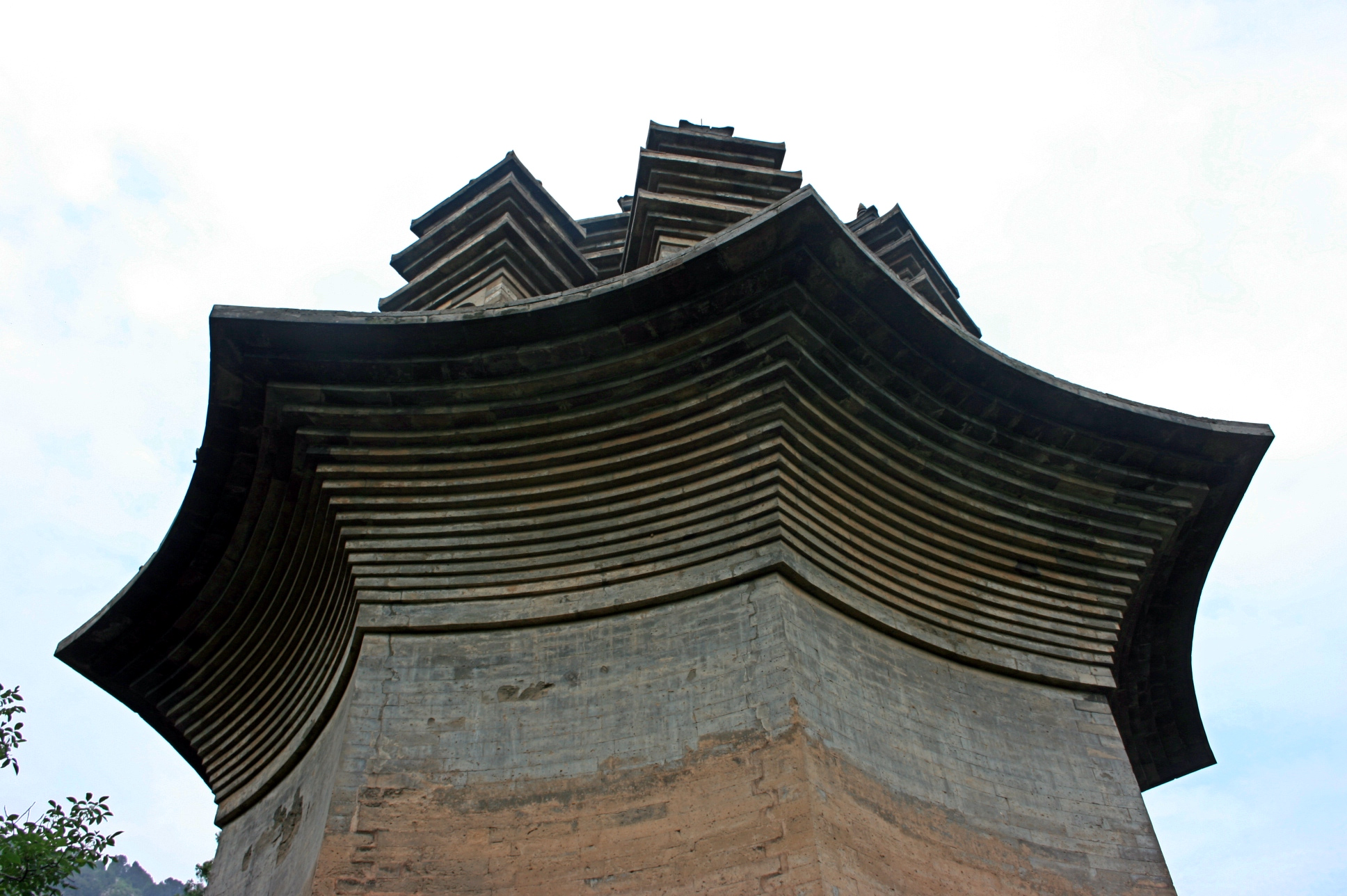
17-layer brick eaves

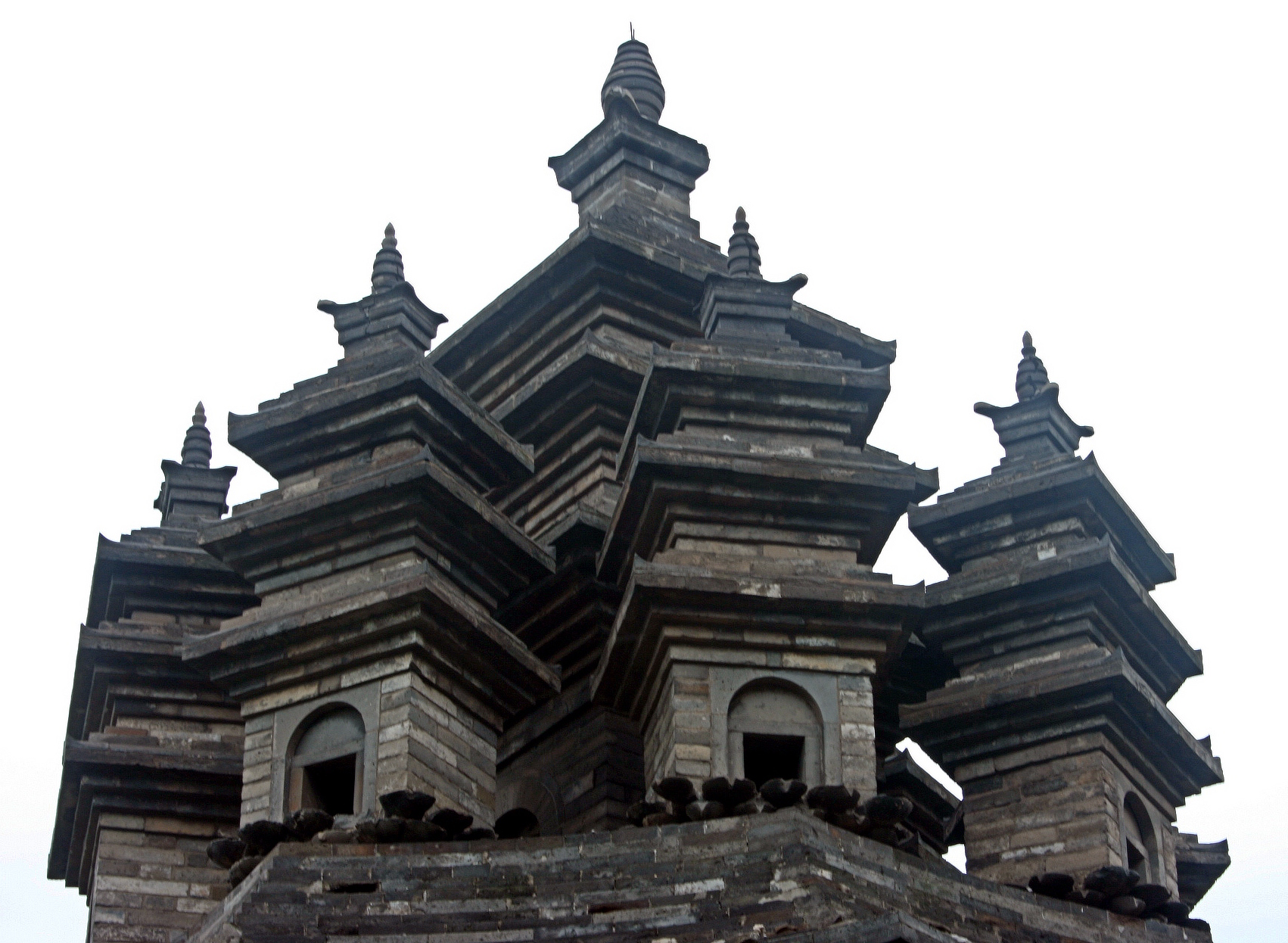
Roof pagodas

== See also ==
- Four Gates Pagoda (nearby)
- Dragon-and-Tiger Pagoda (nearby)
- Thousand-Buddha Cliff (nearby)
- List of sites in Jinan
- Chinese pagoda

== References and external links ==
- online article from the China Internet Information Center
- Jiuding Pagoda Park of Minority Customs - Jinan Tourism Administration
