= Beilun, Ningbo =

Beilun 北仑区
- District
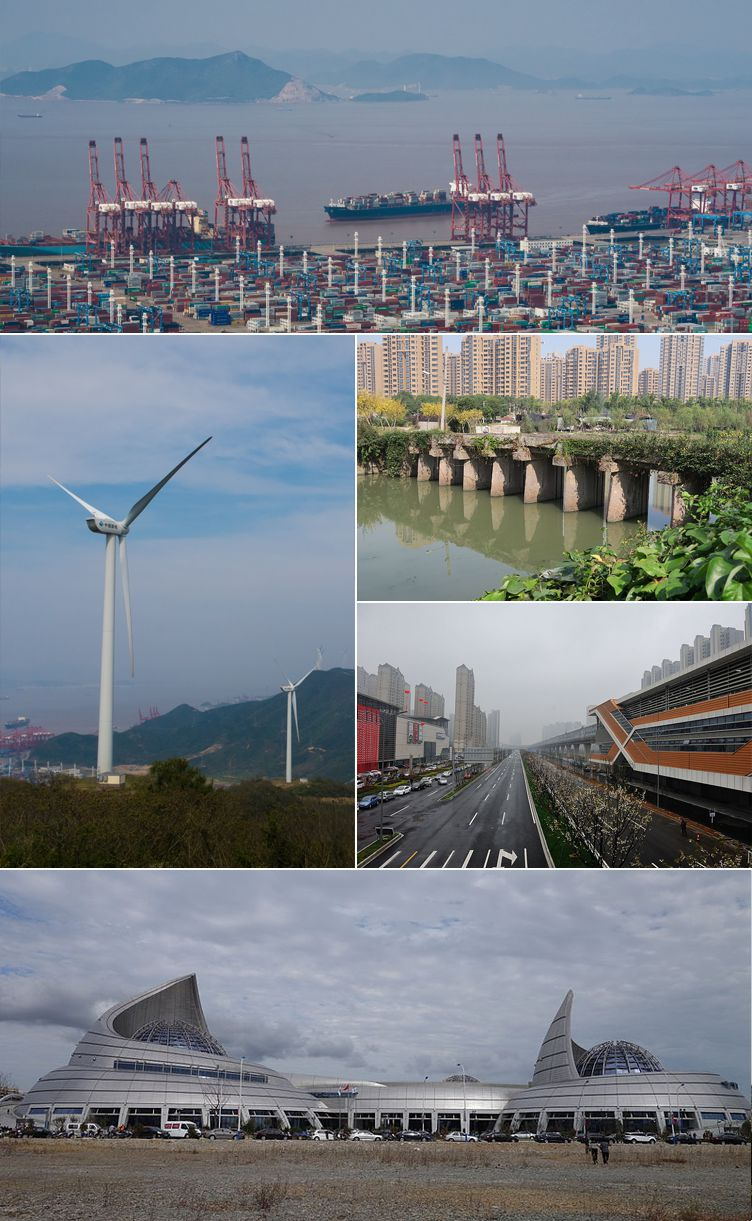
- Clockwise from the top: Port of Ningbo, Yanshan Dyke, Zhonghe Road Station, China Port Museum, Chuanshan Wind Power Plant

- Beilun District in Ningbo Municipality

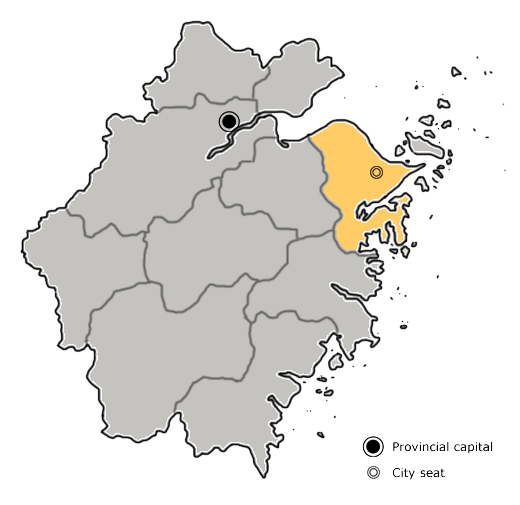
- Ningbo in Zhejiang province
- Coordinates: 29.9236°N 121.834°E
- Country: People's Republic of China
- Provinces of China: Zhejiang
- Sub-provincial city: Ningbo

Area
  - Total: 599.03 km^{2} (231.29 sq mi)

Population (2008)
  - Total: 380,100
  - Density: 634.5/km^{2} (1,643/sq mi)
- Time zone: UTC+8 (China Standard)
- Postal code: 315800
- Area code: 0574
- Website: www.bl.gov.cn

Beilun (Note: Chinese: 北仑区, [peɪ̯²¹⁴⁻²¹ lu̯ən³⁵]) (simplified Chinese: 北仑区; traditional Chinese: 北侖區; pinyin: Běilún Qū; Wu: Poh-len Chiu) is a district of Ningbo in Zhejiang province, China. It is dominated by Beilun port, an international port of the easternmost edge of the southern coast of Hangzhou Bay. It primarily services the regional city of Ningbo. Beilun district has 380,000 permanent residents and 850,000 residents. Beilun district has a land area of 615 square kilometers, a sea area of 258 square kilometers and a coastline of 150 kilometers. It is the largest sea area and the longest coastline area within the jurisdiction of Ningbo city.

== Beilun port ==
Originally a small fishing town, the presence of a deep sea lane with year-round minimum depth of 17 meters stretching along the coast of Beilun motivated the Chinese Government to build one of the nation's largest deep sea port here. The port is further protected from storms by the mountainous islets of Zhoushan just off the coast of Beilun.

14.31 billion yuan has been invested in the Beilun port. With the completion of the Hangzhou Bay Bridge in 2008, Beilun is set to receive increased volumes of international freight and be more closely tied to the metropolis of Shanghai. It has been proposed that Beilun port be managed by the Shanghai port authority. Swift and dangerous undersea currents in Shanghai contribute to an inefficient port that costs the city a great deal to keep open, and even then it is often only usable during high tide. Beilun is also home to a small free trade zone that has a concentration of manufacturers focused on vacuum formed packaging and an older plant that manufactured window air conditioners for Fedders.

Guodian Beilun Power Station, one of the world's largest coal power stations, is installed in Beilun's Xinqi town, and managed by the national SOE China Guodian Corporation. Built in two phases, starting in 1988 with a loan from the World Bank, with main equipment imported from France and Japan.

== Geology ==
Beilun district is one of the six municipal districts in Ningbo city. Beilun district stands on the coast of the east China sea. Approximately 62 CPC central committee and state leaders have visited the district for inspection and guidance.

About 7000 years ago the area that now makes up the Beilun district was underwater with only the Tiantai mountains such as Taibai mountain and Lingfeng mountain visible. As the tides ebbed the land was gradually revealed and the peoples living in the area built ponds to block the tide and enclosed the sea area to set up land and improve the landscape. The regional landform of Beilun district is mainly characterized by hills and plains in the northwest and the middle, and hills in the southeast. It was separated by the Lingfeng mountain, thus, west of the mountain is the Changshan plain and east of the mountain is the Chaiqiao plain.

The area is intertwined with water sources such as the Xiaolijiang, Yan, Tai, and Lujiang rivers, which originate from the southwest Shan 'ao, a piece of flat land in a mountain range, and flow through two plains. Beilun district belongs to a subtropical Marine climate, which is mild and humid, four distinct seasons, fog days less and frost-free period. It has abundant rainfall, the average annual precipitation is about 1310 mm and the average annual temperature is about 16.7 °C.

== Administrative divisions ==
Subdistricts:

- Xinqi Subdistrict (新碶街道), Chaiqiao Subdistrict (柴桥街道), Daqi Subdistrict (大碶街道), Daxie Subdistrict (大榭街道), Qijiashan Subdistrict (戚家山街道), Xiaogang Subdistrict (小港街道), Xiapu Subdistrict (霞浦街道)

Towns:

- Baifeng (白峰镇), Chunxiao (春晓镇)

The only township is Meishan Township (梅山乡)

== Climate ==
Climate data for Beilun, elevation 5 m (16 ft), (1991–2020 normals, extremes 1981–present)
Month	Jan	Feb	Mar	Apr	May	Jun	Jul	Aug	Sep	Oct	Nov	Dec	Year
Record high °C (°F)	26.4 (79.5)	29.5 (85.1)	32.5 (90.5)	33.7 (92.7)	34.9 (94.8)	37.9 (100.2)	40.5 (104.9)	40.8 (105.4)	37.5 (99.5)	35.4 (95.7)	30.0 (86.0)	25.9 (78.6)	40.8 (105.4)
Mean daily maximum °C (°F)	9.2 (48.6)	10.9 (51.6)	14.7 (58.5)	20.2 (68.4)	24.8 (76.6)	28.0 (82.4)	32.8 (91.0)	32.3 (90.1)	28.0 (82.4)	23.3 (73.9)	18.1 (64.6)	12.0 (53.6)	21.2 (70.1)
Daily mean °C (°F)	5.9 (42.6)	7.3 (45.1)	10.7 (51.3)	15.8 (60.4)	20.6 (69.1)	24.3 (75.7)	28.7 (83.7)	28.5 (83.3)	24.8 (76.6)	19.8 (67.6)	14.4 (57.9)	8.4 (47.1)	17.4 (63.4)
Mean daily minimum °C (°F)	3.2 (37.8)	4.4 (39.9)	7.5 (45.5)	12.2 (54.0)	17.3 (63.1)	21.4 (70.5)	25.5 (77.9)	25.7 (78.3)	22.0 (71.6)	16.7 (62.1)	11.3 (52.3)	5.3 (41.5)	14.4 (57.9)
Record low °C (°F)	−6.4 (20.5)	−4.0 (24.8)	−2.5 (27.5)	0.7 (33.3)	8.4 (47.1)	13.6 (56.5)	18.6 (65.5)	19.5 (67.1)	11.4 (52.5)	3.5 (38.3)	−0.1 (31.8)	−5.9 (21.4)	−6.4 (20.5)
Average precipitation mm (inches)	89.2 (3.51)	78.6 (3.09)	122.6 (4.83)	102.9 (4.05)	119.6 (4.71)	220.8 (8.69)	132.7 (5.22)	182.8 (7.20)	186.7 (7.35)	99.0 (3.90)	88.5 (3.48)	78.1 (3.07)	1,501.5 (59.1)
Average precipitation days (≥ 0.1 mm)	12.1	11.5	14.9	13.7	13.5	16.4	11.8	14.0	13.6	8.7	10.5	10.5	151.2
Average snowy days	2.3	1.6	0.5	0	0	0	0	0	0	0	0	1.0	5.4
Average relative humidity (%)	75	75	76	74	77	83	78	78	79	75	76	74	77
Mean monthly sunshine hours	95.0	101.8	121.6	146.9	156.6	118.1	218.0	207.5	152.1	146.6	107.5	104.0	1,675.7
Percentage possible sunshine	29	32	33	38	37	28	51	51	41	42	34	33	37
Source: China Meteorological Administrationall-time extreme temperature All-time Oct extreme

== Scenic spots ==
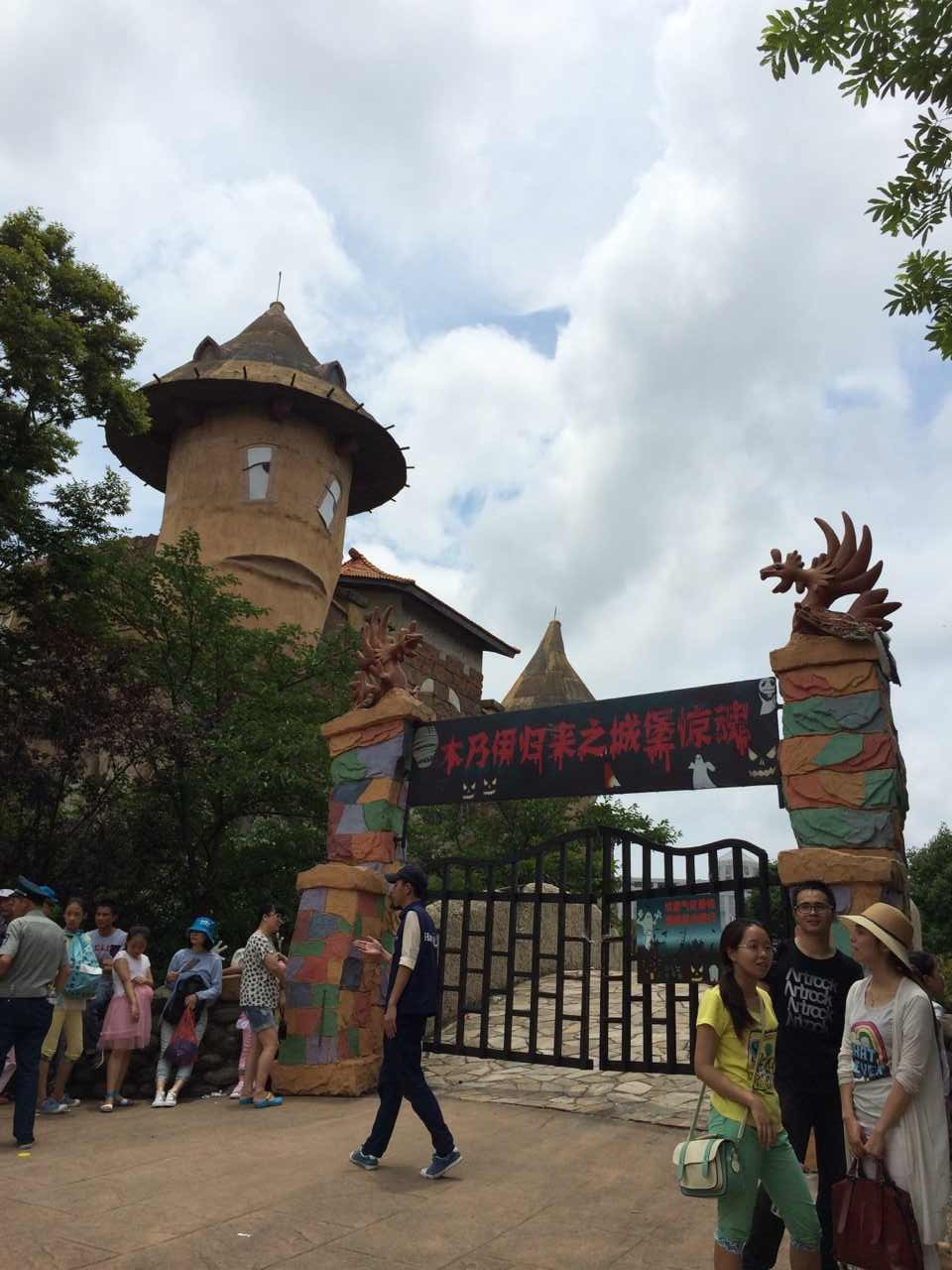
Ningbo Phoenix Mountain Theme Park

=== Ningbo Phoenix Mountain Theme Park ===
Ningbo Phoenix Mountain theme park is a high-tech large-scale international theme park in the 21st century built with full investment by Beilun district government. It is a national AAAA tourist area. The first phase of the park, with an investment of nearly $100 million and an area of 260,000 square meters, was designed by the top American amusement design company JRA and adopted the latest design concepts in the world. The second phase of the park has invested nearly 100 million CNY, covering an area of about 40,000 square meters. It has set up two amusement areas, named "Dragon Palace" and "Bobo Community", which are mainly for entertaining and family travel. The slogan of the theme park is "Joy, Fashion, Surprise and Excitement". It is the first - class happy kingdom and holiday resort in East China.

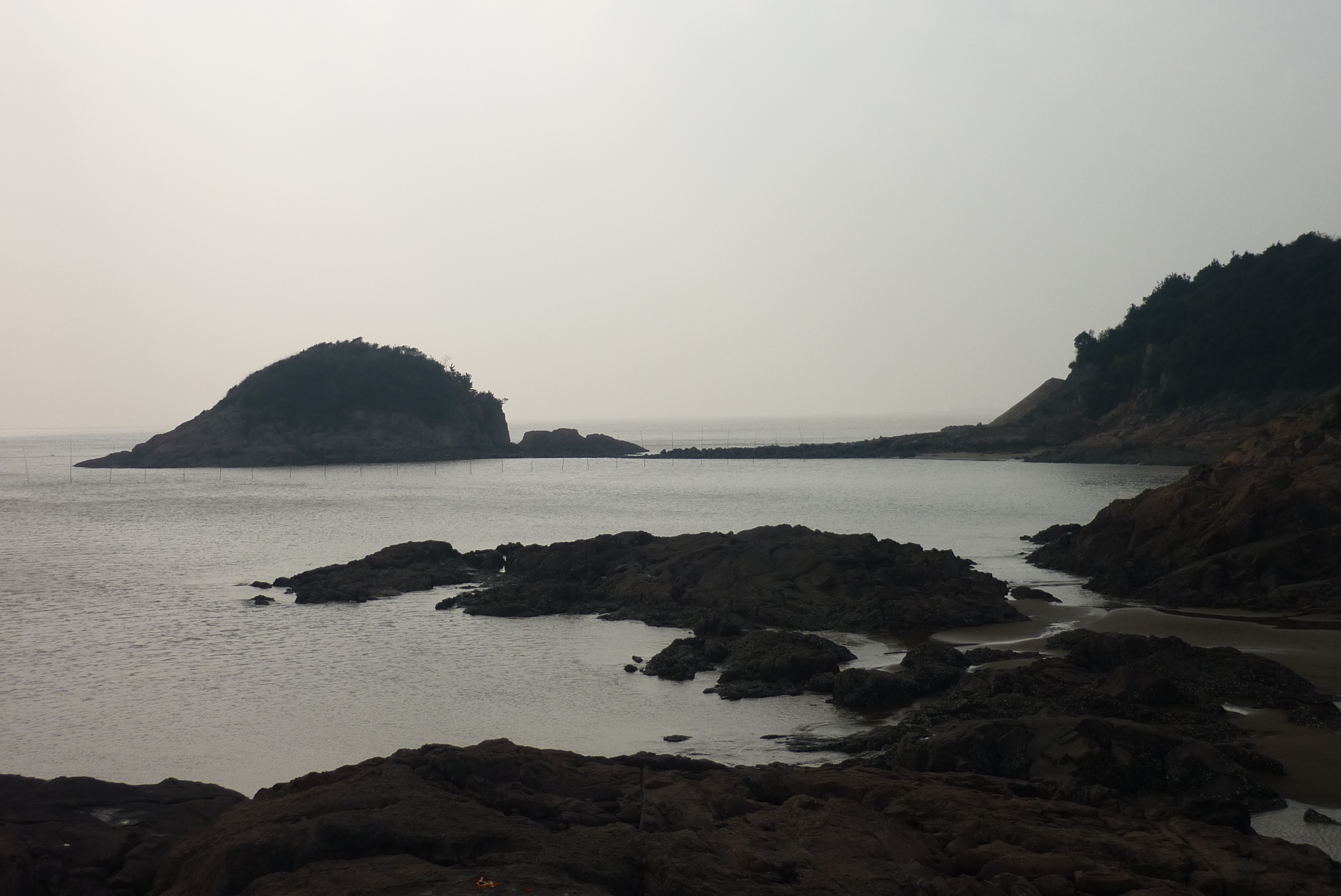
Yangsha Mountain

=== Yangsha Mountain ===
Yangsha Mountain is located about 2 kilometers south of Chunxiao Park in Ningbo Economic Development Zone, Chunxiao Town, Beilun District, Ningbo City. Its geographical location is 29°45'3.87" North latitude and 121°54'36.96" East longitude. Yangsha mountain is surrounded by sea on three sides and covers an area of 128 hectares. It is mainly composed of 4 small islands connected by reefs, with 4 major landscapes: Red Rock Red Reef, Mother Island, Great Wall at Sea, and Silver Beach.

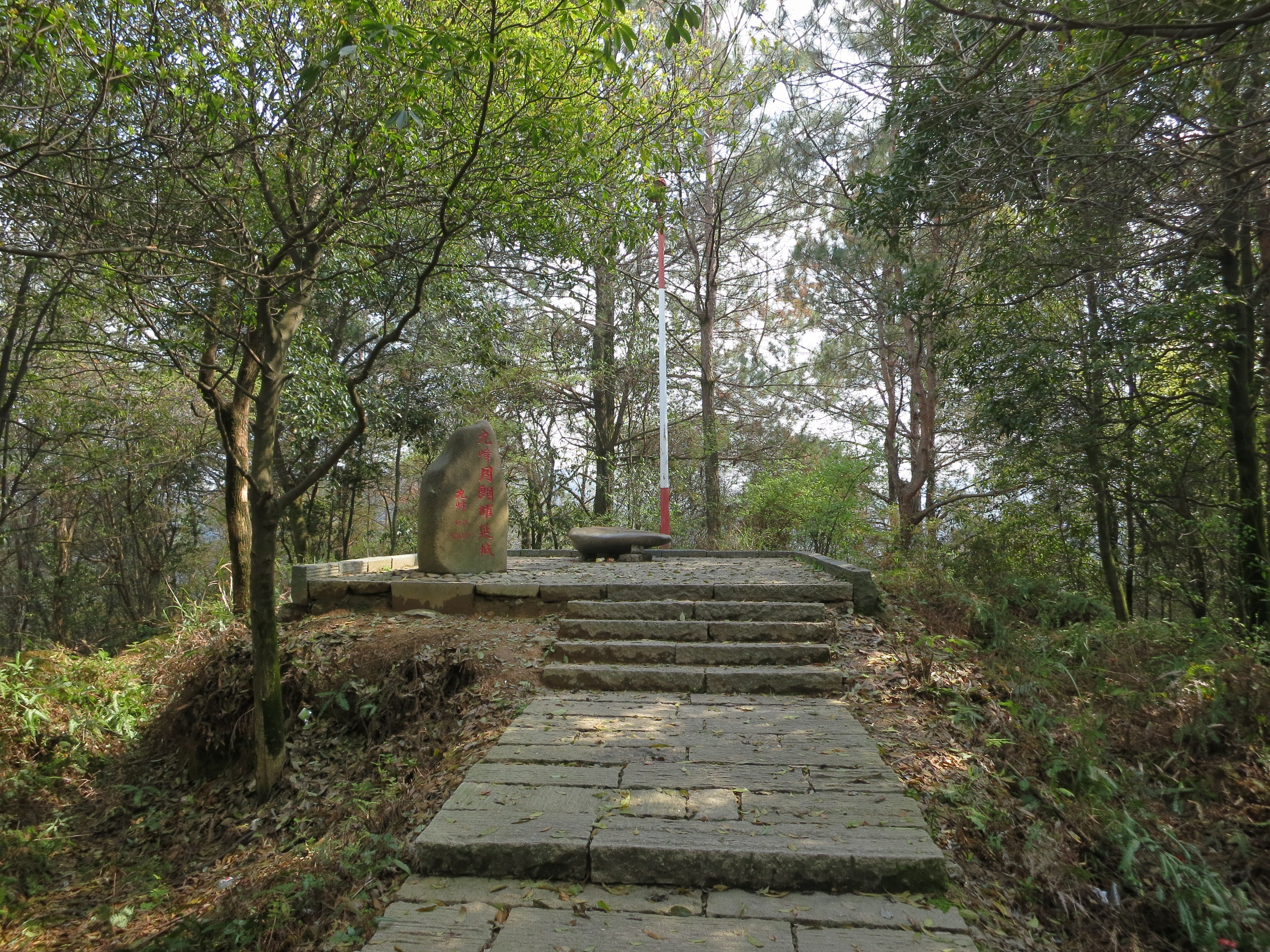
Jiufeng Mountain

=== Jiufeng Mountain ===
Jiufeng mountain tourist area covers a total area of 34 square kilometers, with 26 peaks, two large lakes and nearly 10,000 acres of forest. It is composed of Wangao scenic spot, Ruiyan scenic spot and Yanhu eight pit scenic spots, which is famous as one of Ningbo's mountaineering bases, ten leisure tourism bases and ten ecological scenic spots. Jiufeng mountain enjoys the reputation of "Jiangnan health heaven", "the most east end of Jiangnan mainland", "the famous mountain in the area of east China sea", "the most beautiful mountain in Ningbo city", "the kingdom of animals and plants", etc.

== Economy ==
According to preliminary statistics, in 2018, the regional GDP of Beilun district (including Ningbo bonded area and Daxie development area) reached 161.839 billion CNY, representing an increase of 7.1% at comparable prices. In terms of industries, the added value of the primary industry reached 807 million CNY, and it is an increase of 1.0% over the previous year. The added value of the secondary industry reached 97.275 billion CNY, which increased 5.6%, including the added value of the industrial industry reached 91.921 billion CNY, which increased 5.7%. The added value of the tertiary industry reached 63.757 billion CNY, up 9.6%, with a ratio of 0.5 to 60.1 to 39.4 in the three industrial structure. Based on the registered population, the per capita GDP of Beilun district reached 386,302 CNY (USD $58,377 at the annual average exchange rate) in 2018.

In the region, Beilun's GDP reached 114.646 billion CNY, up 7.5%. In terms of different industries, the added value of the Primary industry (finance, employment) reached 807 million CNY, up 1.0%; the added value of the Second industry (agriculture, rural areas) reached 69.857 billion CNY, up 7.0% (among them, the added value of the industrial industry reached 65.962 billion CNY, up 7.2%); the added value of the Third industry (industry and construction) reached 43.982 billion CNY, up 8.5%. Daxie development zone achieved a GDP of 33.314 billion CNY, up 4.5%. The total GDP of Ningbo bonded area reached 13.878 billion CNY, with an increase of 10.0%.

The total fiscal revenue of Beilun district reached 57.661 billion CNY, with an increase of 19.3% over the previous year, and the general public budget revenue reached 29.185 billion CNY, with an increase of 18.4%. The total industrial output value of the 754 industrial enterprises above the designated size reached 410.340 billion CNY, with an increase of 9.7% over the previous year. Total profits and taxes amounted is about 49.121 billion CNY, up 3.9%; and the profit totaled 35.904 billion CNY, up 2.8%. The annual fixed asset investment reached 38.925 billion CNY, with an increase of 5.0% over the previous year. The output value of 102 construction enterprises with qualifications above reached 16.731 billion CNY, up 8.2%. The total retail sales of consumer goods reached 25.552 billion CNY, with an increase of 2.0% over the previous year. The total volume of foreign trade reached 272.049 billion CNY, up 13.3%, of which exports reached 118.352 billion CNY, up 11.0%, and imports reached 153.697 billion CNY, up 15.1%. Contractual utilization of foreign capital totaled US$2.059 billion, up 27.4%, and actual utilization of foreign capital totaled US$1.141 billion, up 11.3%.

== Food ==
=== Cicheng rice cake ===
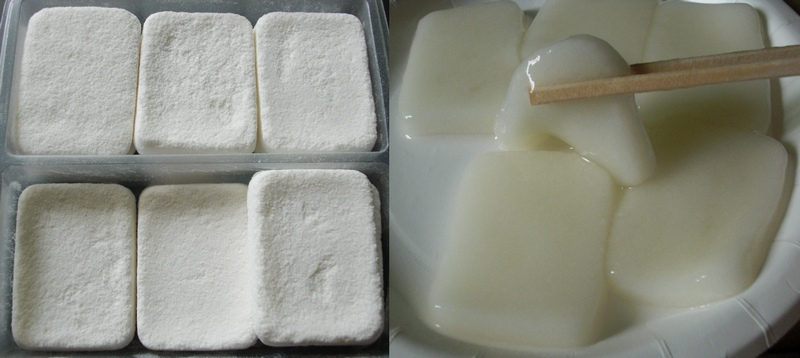
Cicheng Rice Cake

The area is known for the Cicheng rice cake, a water mill rice cake that is a specialty in Cicheng, Ningbo. The cake is made using high quality Japonica rice and ten methods are used to make the texture smooth and chewy. The most common way to prepare the rice cake in Ningbo is to add the rice cake to soup or fry them with oil. Pickled cabbage and shredded pork rice cake soup is a typical Ningbo dish, which is salty with a slight sour taste.

=== Qiang crab ===
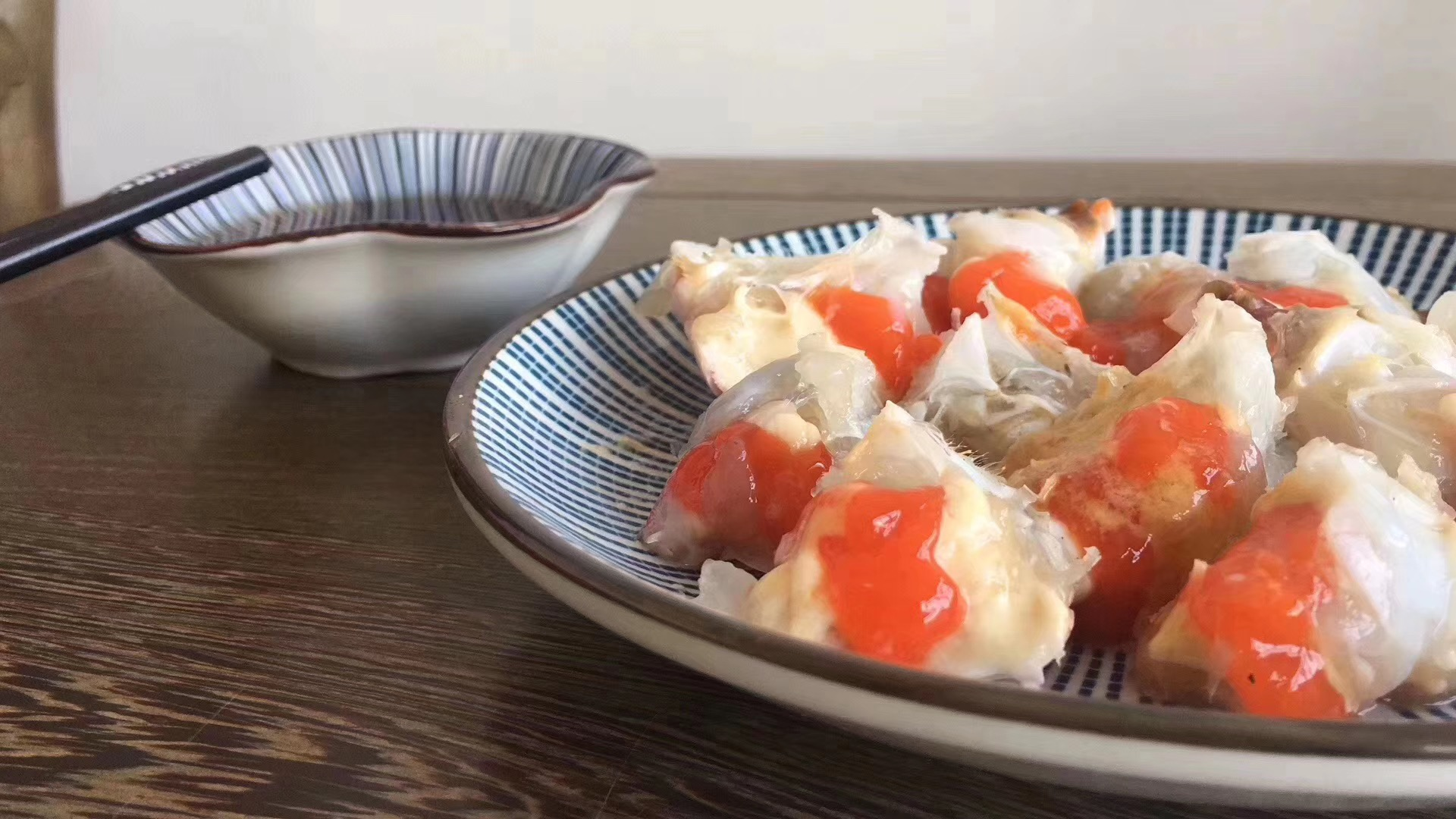
Qiang Crab

Seafood makes up a major part of Ningbo's cuisine and Qiang crab with red paste is one of its most common dishes. It is traditionally made from female swimming crabs that are rich in red roe during the late-autumn season. The crabs are first cleaned and drained, then covered with coarse salt to remove excess water and preserve freshness. Then, they are marinated in a mixture of Shaoxing rice wine, salt, and ginger, with the ratio carefully balanced to avoid excessive salinity. The marination usually lasts for about half a day to one day in a cool place. When ready, the crab meat becomes firm and the roe turns bright red. When served, it is usually placed with the roe side facing up to highlight its color. The dish is eaten cold and often paired with vinegar and thin slices of ginger as vinegar can neutralize the sea smell and cleanse the meat while ginger is said to protect and help digestion. The taste begins slightly sour, followed by a rich, salty flavour and a mild sweetness from the roe. It is commonly eaten with white rice, which helps to balance the saltiness and enhance the overall taste.

==== History of Qiang Crab ====
Qiang Crab, also known as Honggao Qiangxie or Ningbo Salted Raw Crab, has its origins in the coastal fishing culture of Ningbo. Local fishermen developed the dish during the early years of the region's fishing industry, when blue swimming crabs were abundant but difficult to store for long periods. In the absence of modern refrigeration, they began experimenting with salting freshly caught crabs to prevent them from spoiling. Over time, this simple preservation practice gradually developed into a refined local method that became part of Ningbo's traditional seafood culture.

==== Modern adaptations ====
In recent years, Qiang crab has also been sold online through e-commerce and live-streaming platforms. Many of these products are vacuum-sealed and ready to eat, which makes them easy to transport and store. Some seafood companies use standardised recipes to maintain consistency in taste and extend storage life. This dish has become popular among young consumers, who buy it as a local speciality. However, online sales have also led to differences in product quality and prices.

=== Ningbo sweet dumpling (tangyuan) ===
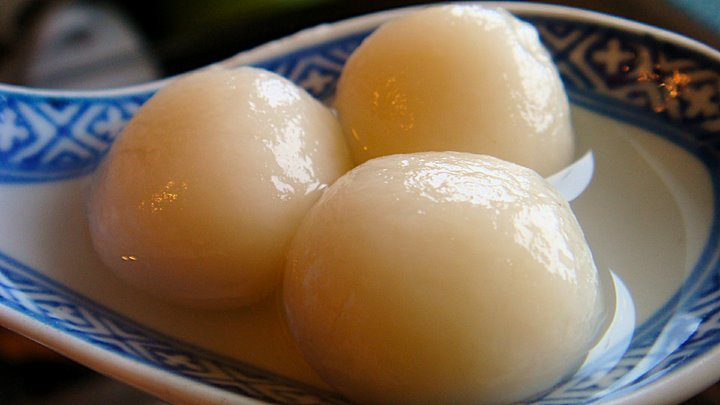
Tangyuan

The tangyuan, or Ningbo sweet dumpling, is created by mixing black sesame seeds, lard, and sugar together as the filling, which is placed into a sticky rice ball, which is then fried or boiled. The filling is occasionally changed by substituting the sesame filling with pork, durian, and red bean paste.

==== History and cultural significance ====
The Ningbo sweet dumpling, or tangyuan, is believed to have originated during the Southern Song dynasty, giving it a history of more than seven hundred years. Early records describe it as a popular winter snack among families in coastal Zhejiang, where glutinous rice was widely cultivated. The traditional filling of black sesame, lard and sugar is well-known for its smooth texture and rich taste, distinguishing Ningbo's version from those in other regions.

== Nature ==
Although much of the district is highly developed, it contains some forested hilly areas. It is home to the Chinhai spiny newt, which is unique to the area. One population is within the Ruiyansi Forest Park.

== See also ==
- Guoju
