= Thousand Buddha Mountain =

Hill in Shandong, China

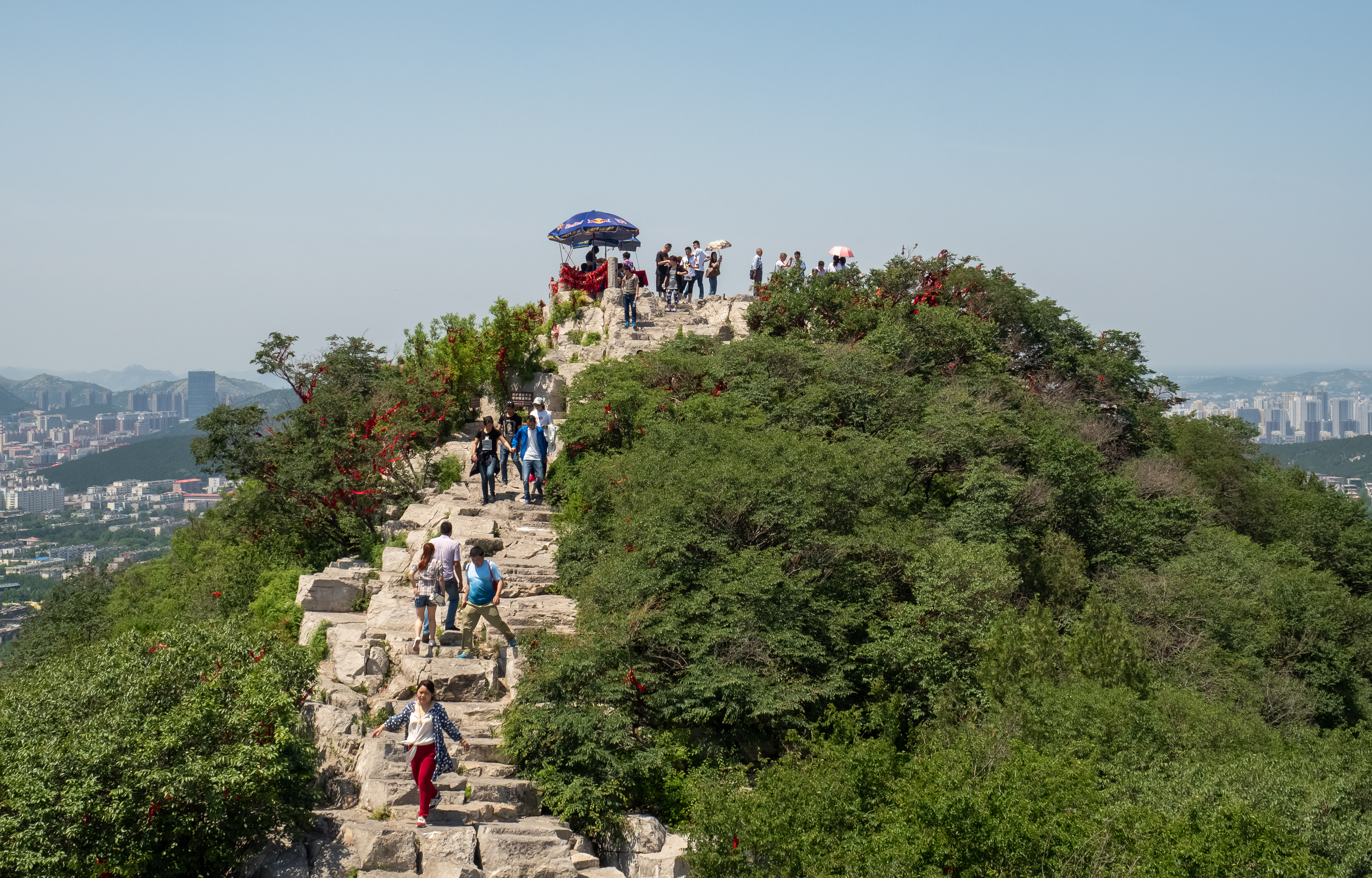
View along the ridge of the hill from the western side

The Thousand Buddha Mountain (Chinese: 千佛山; pinyin: Qiānfó Shān) is a hill located about 2.5 kilometers southeast of the city of Jinan, the capital of Shandong Province, China. It covers 1.518 square kilometers (375 acres) and has a peak of 285 meters (935 feet) above sea level. It is renowned for its numerous Buddha images which have been carved out of the hill's rock faces or free-standing structures erect since the times of the Sui dynasty (581–618) and its Xingguochan Temple. It is considered one of the "Three Greatest Attractions in Jinan" together with Baotu Spring and Daming Lake. It is also one of the 4A-rated Tourist attractions in China. Thousand Buddha Mountain is opened up as a public park in 1959, rated as AAAA-rated Tourist Attractions of China in 2005, and rated as National Park of China in March 2017.

== Legend ==
According to local tradition, the legendary Emperor Shun was credited as opening up the land and cultivating it under the mountain. Thus, the Thousand Buddha Mountain is also known as the Shungeng Hill (meaning the hill where Shun cultivated).

According to a legend recounted in the Youyang Zazu (Youyang Miscellanies) by Tang dynasty writer Duan Chengshi (800–863), the Thousand Buddha Mountain was originally situated by the sea. The sea god, seeking to keep the mountain in place, secured it with a large lock to prevent the mountain god from relocating it. However, when the lock eventually broke, the mountain was flung through the air to its current location. In homage to this legend, an artwork resembling a large lock and chain has been installed at the mountain's summit.

== History ==
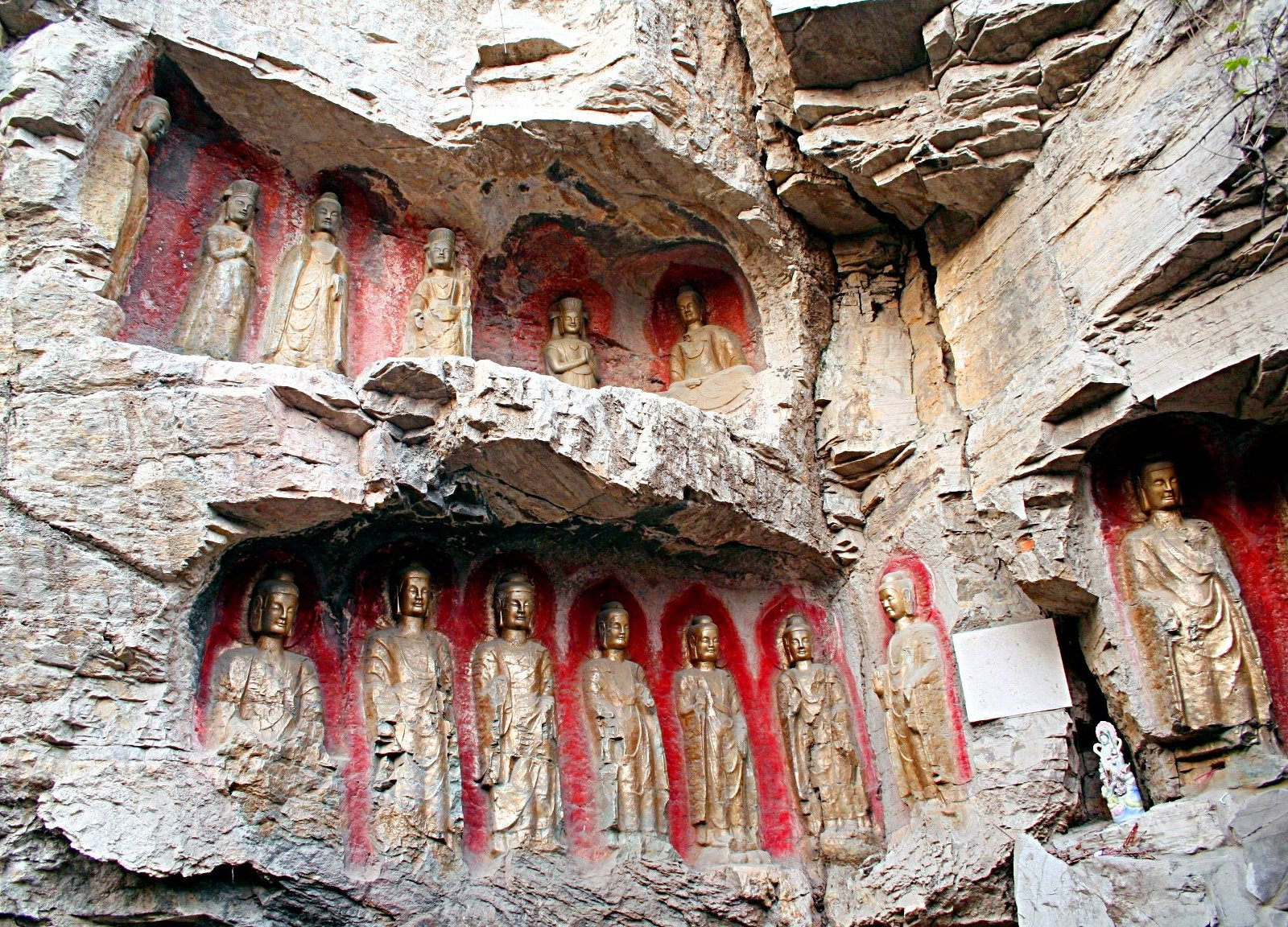
Buddha statues in a cliff south of the Xingguochan Temple

Buddhism became popular in the Jinan area during the reign of Emperor Wen, the founder of the Sui dynasty. With Buddhism, monks came to the area and chiseled Buddha statues out of the flanks of the hill, which was originally called Miji Hill or Li Hill. A temple, called the Thousand Buddha Temple (Qianfosi), was founded at the foot of the hill. Eventually, the hill was renamed after the temple into "Thousand Buddha Mountain". One of the old names, Li Hill (Li Shan), survives in the name of Lishan Road, the major avenue which runs through Jinan towards the Thousand Buddha Mountain in north–south direction.

== Main Attractions ==
The Thousand Buddha Mountain Public Park has been developed extensively for—mostly local tourism—by the creation of access roads and walking paths as well the addition of amusement park features such as a 600-meter-long chairlift, a summer slide (the "Shun'neng Slide") down the hill, a kart racing track, and numerous souvenir stalls. The major attractions mostly have significant meanings to the spread of Buddhism.

=== Thousand Buddha Cliff ===
The Thousand-Buddha Cliff is located on the northern flank of the hill behind the Xingguochan Temple. The foot of the cliff is pierced by four caves, which are named (from west to east): Longquan (meaning Dragon Spring) Cave, Jile (meaning Extremely Happy) Cave, Qianlou Cave, and Luzu Cave. The caves' height ranges from 3 meters down to only 20 centimeters. About 130 Buddha statues which were carved into Thousand-Buddha Cliff during the Sui period remain today, which can trace back for over 1400 years.

=== Xingguochan Temple ===
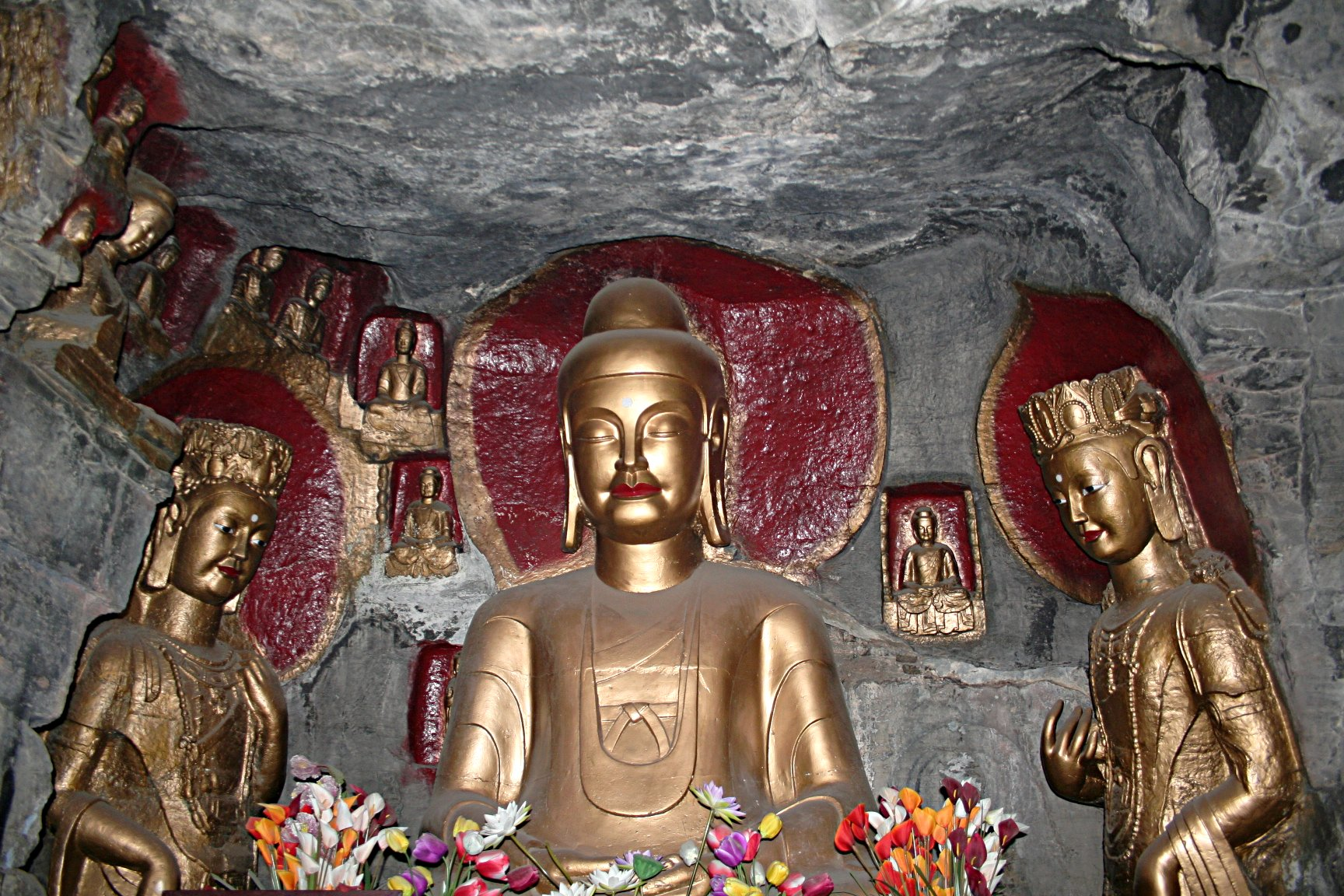
Buddha statues in a cave south of the Xingguochan Temple

Along with the Buddha statues, temples and other buildings were erected on the hill. The most renowned of these structures is the Xingguochan Temple (Chinese: 兴国禅寺; pinyin: Xing Guo Chan Si, literally: "Development of the Country Buddhist Temple") which was originally built during the reign of Emperor Taizhong of Tang as an expansion of the Sui-dynasty Qianfo Temple. Further enlargements were undertaken during the Song dynasty, but the temple was destroyed by war afterwards. Rebuilding was undertaken in 1468, during the Ming dynasty. The Guanying Hall, the Foye Hall, and the Thousand-Hands Buddha statue were added during the Qing dynasty.

The temple is located about halfway up the hill and can be reached via 300 stone steps. A large inscription (total area about 15 square meters) cut into the cliff face to the southwest of the identifies it as the "Number One Temple" (Di Yi Mi Hua). The temple's courtyards feature several stone tablets bearing inscriptions from renowned calligraphers. In one of the temple's courtyards stands a sculpture of the legendary Emperor Shun, who is—according to the local tradition—credited with first ploughing the soil in Jinan as well as with inventing the writing brush. Because of its mythological association with Emperor Shun, the Thousand Buddha hill is also known as Shungeng Hill. The main structure of the temple are: Grand Prayer Hall, Guanying Hall, Dharma Hall, Maitreya Hall, and the Buddhist Scripture building. Lishanyuan courtyard, to the east of the temple, is surrounded by sites of worship belonging to Confucianism, Taoism, and Buddhism. The names of these buildings are: the Shun and the Luban Ancestral Temples, the Wenchang ("Develop the Culture") Cabinet, and the Yilan Kiosk. The temple has been the site of two annual temple fairs held on the 3rd day of the third month and 9th day of the 9th month of the Chinese Lunar Calendar since the times of the Yuan dynasty. It was burned down in wars and rebuild during the Ming dynasty. Other notable buildings on the hill are: the Pagoda Tree Pavilion (Tang dynasty), Cloud Passing Zen Temple, and the Tanghuai Kiosk.

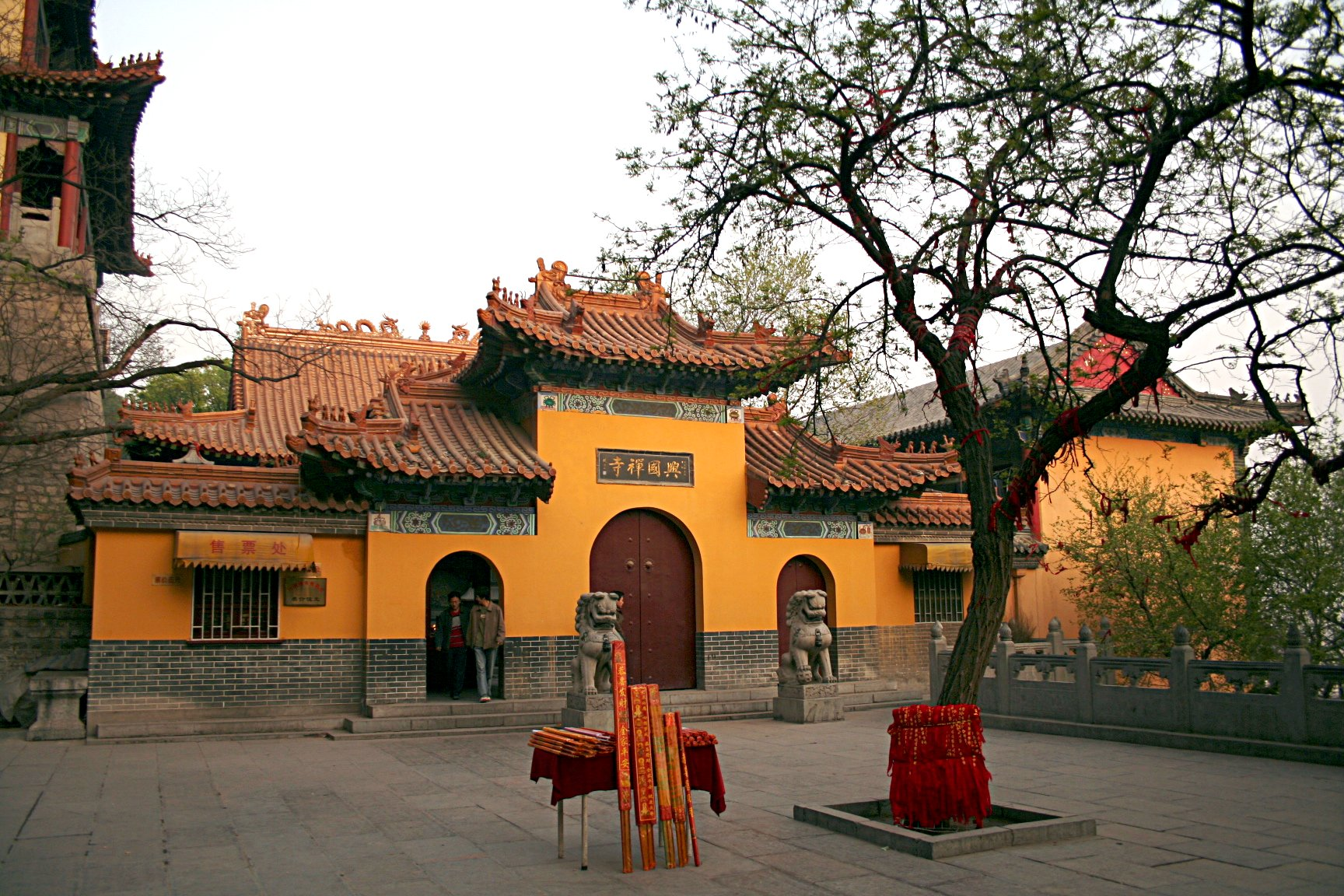
East gate of Xingguochan Temple

Many of the statues on the Thousand Buddha Mountain were damaged or lost during the Cultural Revolution, but restoration started in 1979 already. Since then, many new statues have been added. The largest new statues are a 20-meter-tall sitting Maitreya Buddha completed in 2000 and lying Buddha with a swastika on his chest. The latter statue was carved out of granite in 1996, has a length of 10 meters and weighs approximately 50 tonnes.

=== Myriad Buddha Cave ===
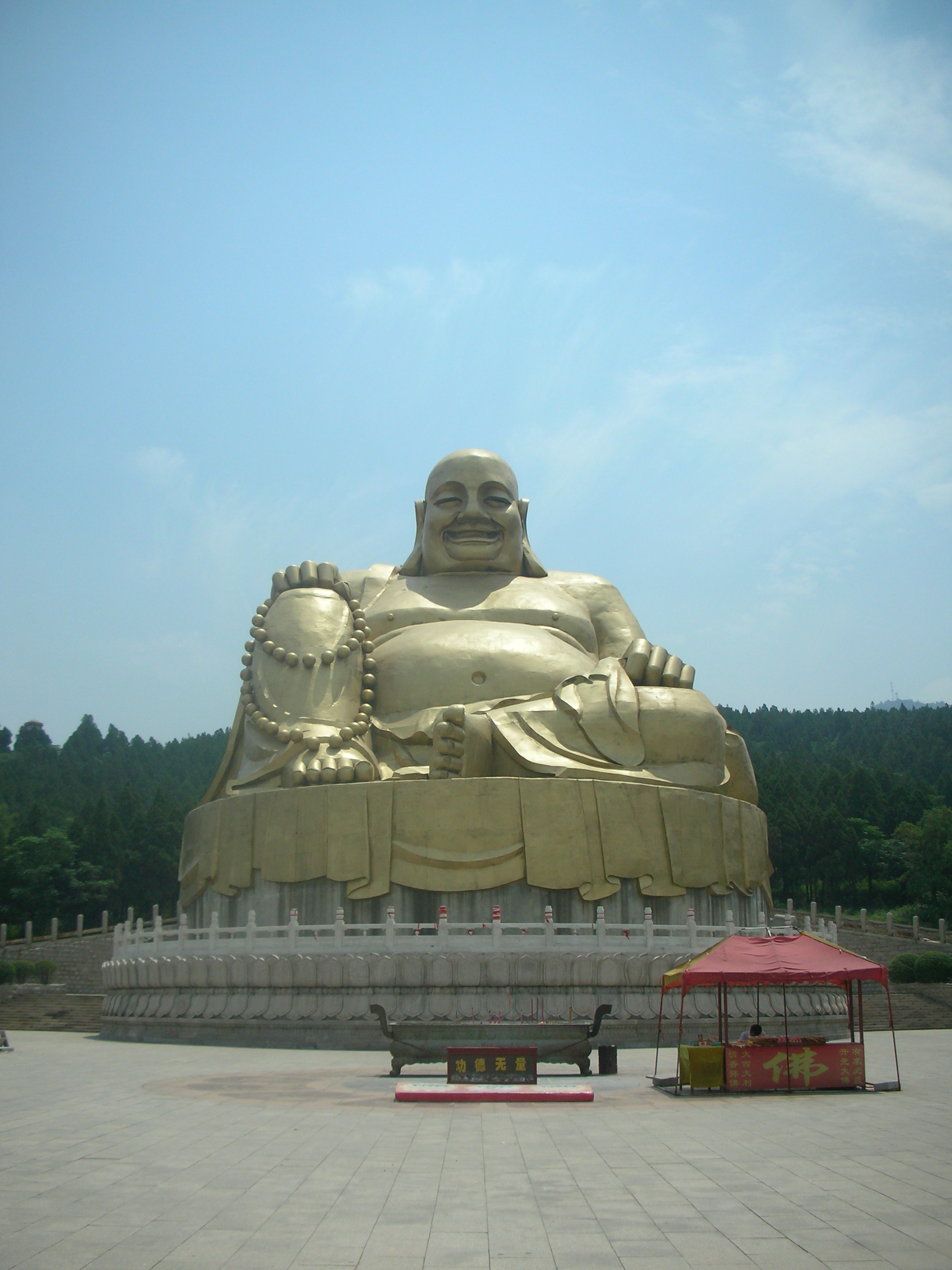
Maitreya Statue

A major tourist attraction is the Myriad Buddha Cave (Wanfo Dong) at the foot of the hill's northern slope. Inside the more than 500 meter-long artificial cave, late-20th-century recreations of Buddhist statues from four famous Chinese grottoes (Dunhuang and Maiji Shan in Gansu Province, Longmen in Henan Province, Yun Gang in Shanxi Province) are on display. The original artworks were created during the Northern Wei, Tang, and Song dynasties. According to the operators (information provided on the backside of the entrance ticket as of 2006), around 28,000 Buddhist images are on display inside the cave, the biggest statue—a lying Buddha—is 28 meters long.

=== Maitreya Garden ===
Located in the east part of the mountain, the Maitreya Garden was built in 2000 with Japanese Corporate Myokoen as a China-Japan Friendship Garden. The garden covers 30 thousand square meters, including the Maitreya statue, Sakura garden, and some other affiliated structures, which is a blend of Chinese and Japanese styles of garden architecture. The whole statue has a height of 30 meters, and is thus known as "the number one largest Buddha north of Yangze River." The information about Maitreya is carved behind the statue on an annular rock face. The carvings are 36 meters long and 3.5 meters high, covering 126 square meters.

== Annual Events ==
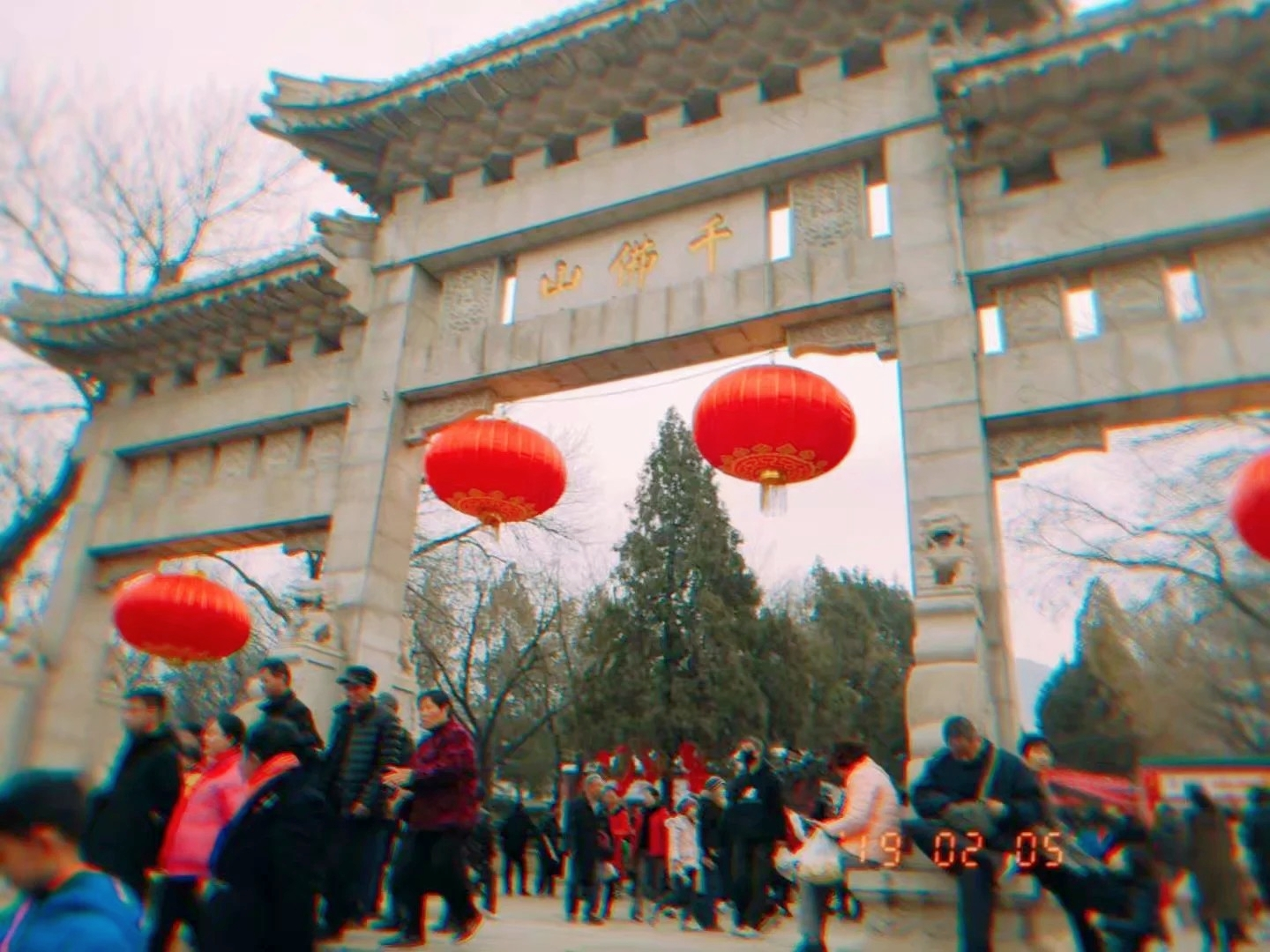
Qianfoshan Spring Festival Temple Fair

=== Lunar New Year Praying Temple Fair ===
As one of the most important festivals of the year, Lunar New Year is the time for Chinese people to pray for good luck for the upcoming year. Every year during Spring Festival, thousands of people visit the Xingguochan Temple to burn incense and pray for their loved ones and for a peaceful year. There is also the temple fair for tourists to feel in flavor of the Spring Festival with folk performances and artifacts.

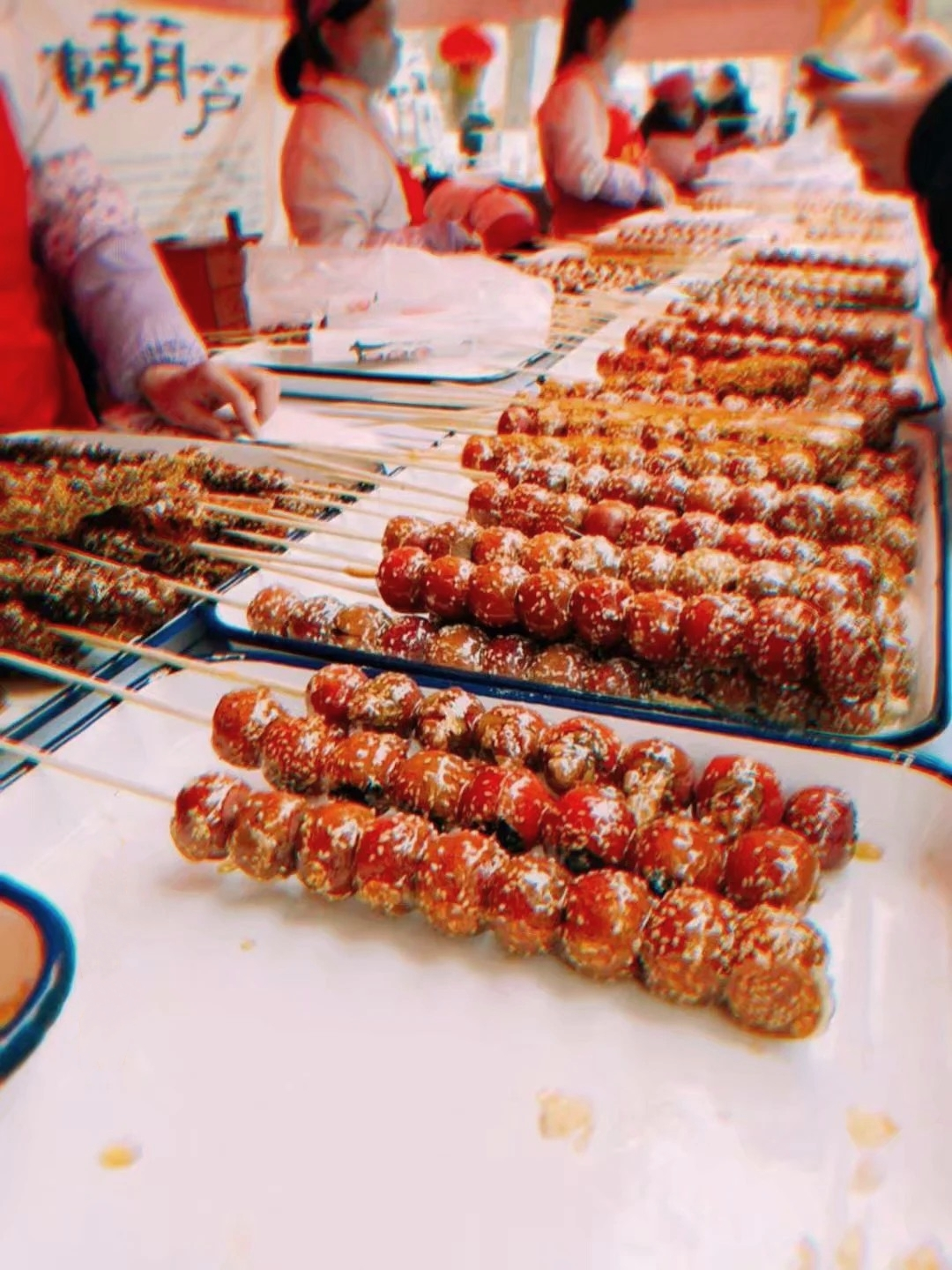
Tanghulu Booth at Qianfoshan Miaohui

=== Qixi Festival Blind Dates ===
During the week of Qixi Festival, the Chinese Valentine's Day, the park holds blind dates for single men and women from Jinan and other places. Mainly in their twenties or thirties, participants post their information onto the board while searching for ones they have interests in. Parents who wish their children to get married also go up the hill to find a date for their children. By 2019, the event had been held for 13 times.

=== Double Ninth Festival Temple Fair ===
The Double Ninth Festival is a traditional Chinese festival on the ninth day of the ninth month in Lunar Calendar. While it is customary to climbing a high mountain, Thousand Buddha Mountain Scenic Spot holds annual temple fair around that time of the year. Exhibition includes artistic performance, folk handicrafts and local souvenirs, agricultural products, and traditional food and snacks. On the date of the festival in 2019, the total number of tourists reached over 62,000.

== Location ==
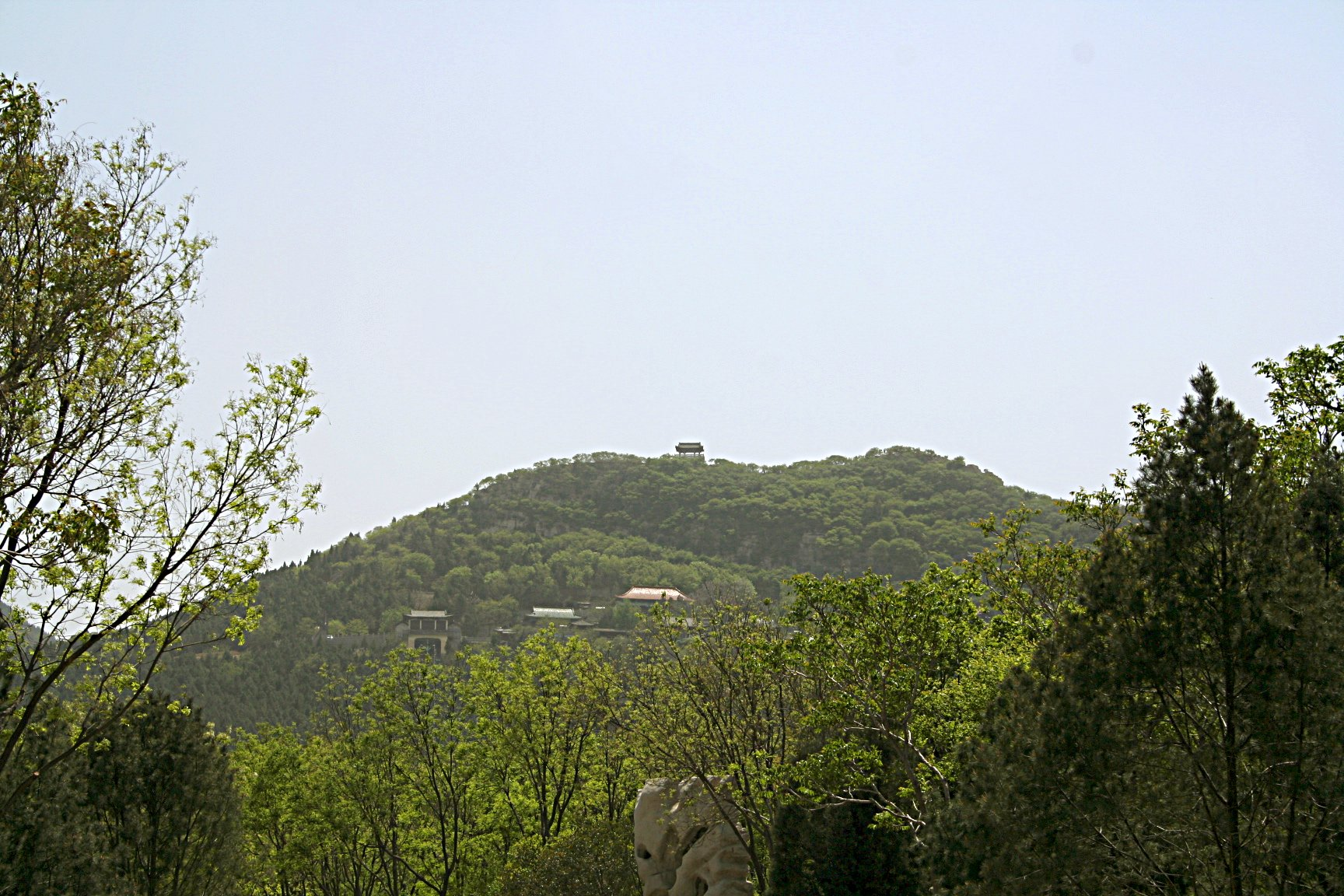
Northern slope of the hill

The Thousand Buddha Mountain Public Park is flanked by a cemetery honoring the fallen of the Xinhai Revolution of 1911 on the east side, the former site of Shandong Provincial Museum to the northeast, and the Jinan Botanical Garden on the west side.

== See also ==
- Thousand-Buddha Cliff
- Buddhism in China
- List of sites in Jinan
