= Dragon-and-Tiger Pagoda =

Pagoda in Shandong Province, China

Coordinates: 36°27′16.93″N 117°7′39.61″E

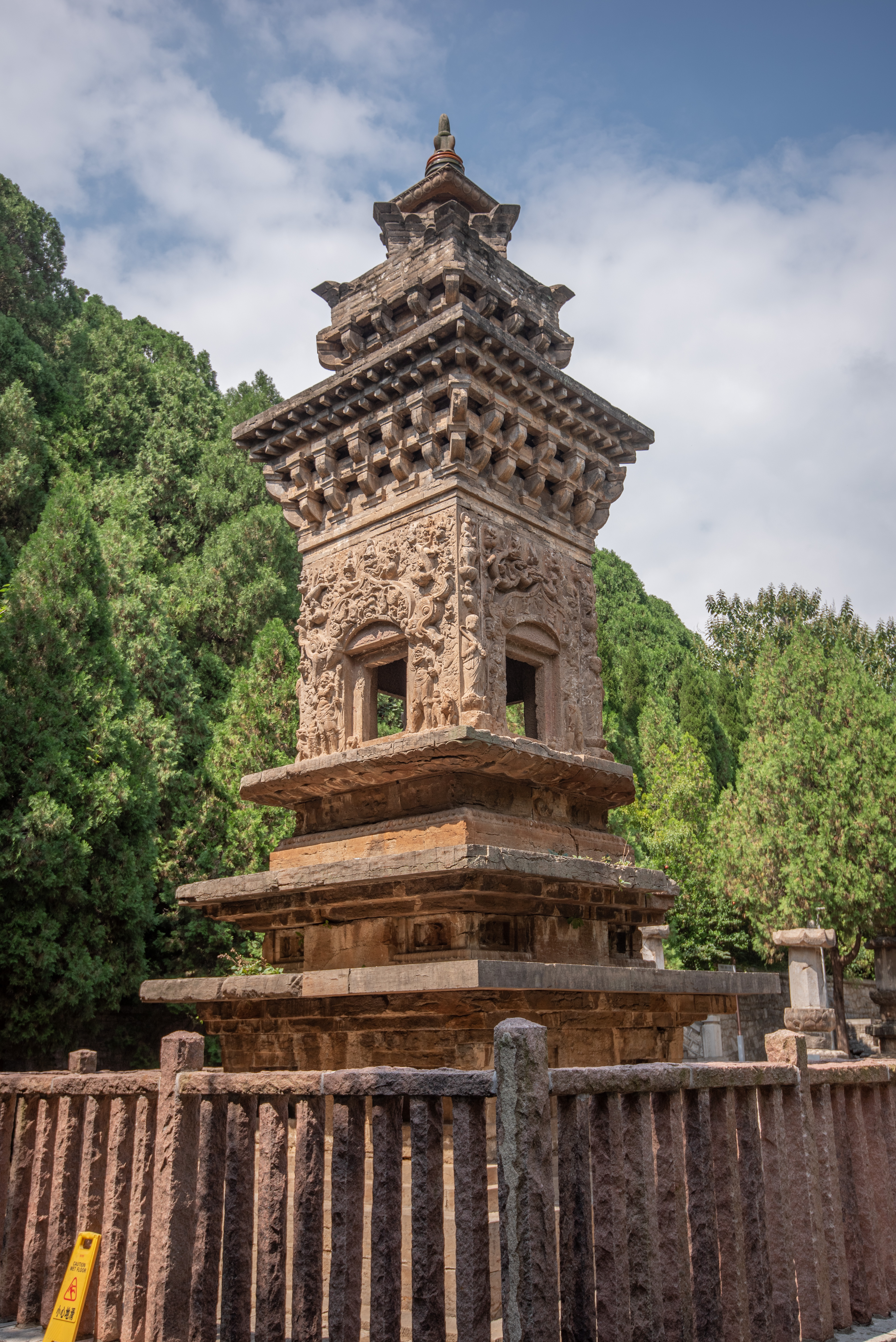
The Dragon-and-Tiger Pagoda in 2020

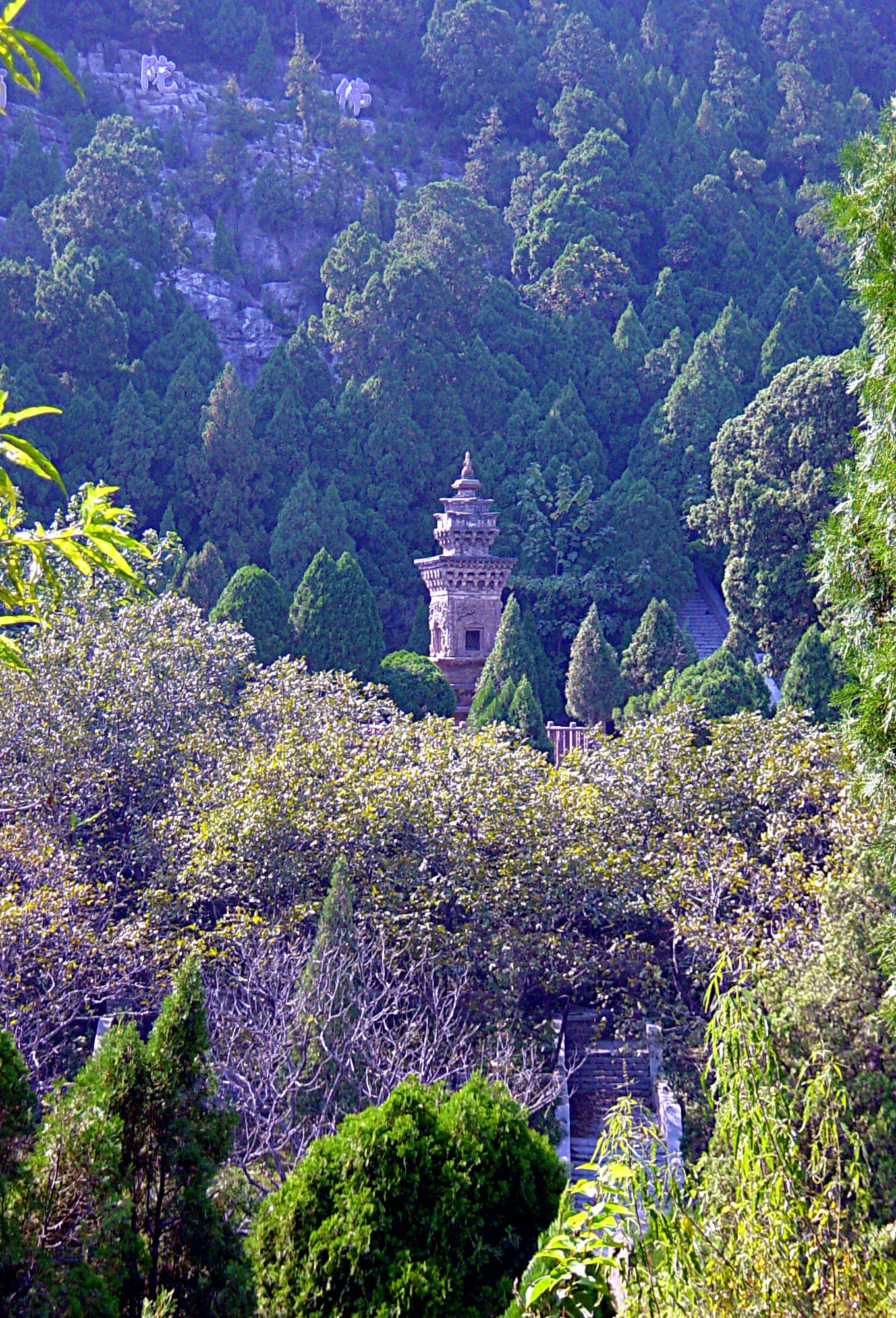
The pagoda seen from a distance

The Dragon-and-Tiger Pagoda (Chinese: 龙虎塔; pinyin: Lóng Hǔ Tǎ) is a Tang dynasty brick and stone pagoda located in central Shandong Province, China. It is considered a characteristic example of the pagoda style of the period.

== Location ==
The Dragon-and-Tiger Pagoda is located in Nanshan, near Liubu Village, in Licheng County, under the administration of Jinan City, about 33 kilometers southeast of the city of Jinan proper. The pagoda stands near the site formerly occupied by the Shentong Temple (Chinese: 神通寺; pinyin: Shen Tong Si, meaning "Supernatural Power" Temple) and was erected as a burial monument to a monk. No records about the construction date of the pagoda are known to exist.

== Structure ==
The pagoda is designed in a single-storey pavilion-style with a square cross-section. The total height of the structure is 10.8 meters. The base of the pagoda consists of a three-tier Sumeru pedestal decorated with relief sculptures of lions and lotus flowers. On the pedestal rests the central pillar of the pagoda which is carved out of a single cube-shaped stone block with four meters edge length. Rectangular doors are carved into each side of the central pillar. Behind each of these doors, a carved Buddha sculpture is positioned. The top of the pagoda consists of a richly decorated brick roof. The artistic and technical design of the roof suggests that it has been rebuilt during the Song dynasty. The pagoda is vividly decorated with alto-relievo Tang-dynasty-style sculpture on the central pillar showing the Buddha, bodhisattvas, celestial guards, and flying apsaras (on top of the doors), as well as the dragons and tigers which give the pagoda its name.

Two other pagodas stand near the Dragon-and-Tiger Pagoda: the Four-Gates Pagoda (Sui dynasty) and the Minor Dragon-and-Tiger Pagoda. The latter also dates from the Tang dynasty era and – although much smaller – shares many features of the Dragon-and-Tiger Pagoda. Also in the immediate vicinity of the Dragon-and-Tiger Pagoda is the Thousand Buddha Cliff into which over 200 religious statues as well as sculptures of noble people have been carved during the Tang dynasty.

== See also ==
- Four Gates Pagoda
- Nine Pinnacle Pagoda
- Songyue Pagoda
- Thousand-Buddha Cliff
- List of sites in Jinan
