= Four Gates Pagoda =

Pagoda in Shandong Province, China

Coordinates: 36°27′10.24″N 117°7′47.28″E

The Four Gates Pagoda (Chinese: 四门塔; pinyin: Sì Mén Tǎ) is a Sui dynasty (581-618 AD) stone Chinese pagoda located in central Shandong Province, China. It is thought to be the oldest remaining pavilion-style stone pagoda in China. The oldest extant brick-built pagoda in China is the 40-metre-tall (130 ft) Songyue Pagoda of 523 AD.

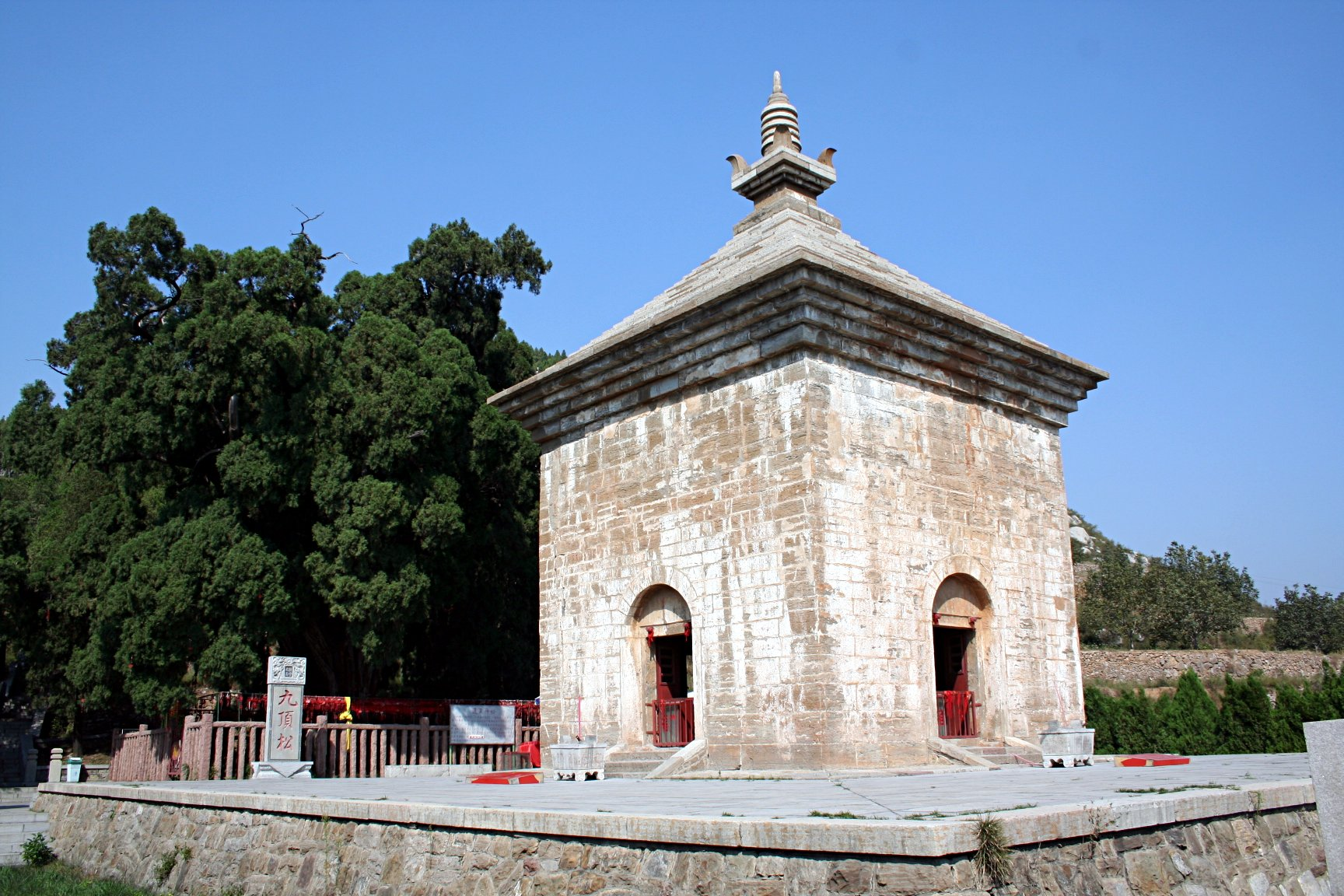
Four Gates Pagoda

== Location ==
The Four Gates Pagoda is located at the foot of Qinglong Mountain, near Liubu Village, in Licheng District, under the administration of Jinan City, about 33 kilometers southeast of the city of Jinan proper. The pagoda is located to the east of the site of the Shentong Temple (Chinese: 神通寺; pinyin: Shéntōng Sì; lit. 'Supernatural Power Temple'), which was one of the most important temples in northern China at the time the pagoda was built but is now in ruins.

== History ==
According to an inscription on a stone tablet which was discovered inside the pagodas ceiling in 1972, the pagoda was "built in the seventh year of the Daye period of the Sui dynasty". This corresponds to the year 611 AD, near the end of the dynasty. The pagoda has been listed as a Major Historical and Cultural Site Protected at the National Level since 1961. The head of one of the four Buddha statues in the pagoda, the Akshobhya Buddha seated on the east wall, was sawed off and stolen in 1997. The head came eventually into the possession of a group of business people from Taiwan, who presented it to Dharma Drum Mountain Foundation in Beitou, Taipei, to be exhibited in the foundation's Museum of Buddhist History and Culture. After the origin of the head was determined, it was returned to its original location in 2002.

== Architecture ==
During the Sui dynasty, stone and brick were introduced as material for building pagodas. The Four-Gates Pagoda was built from blocks quarried from a hard local rock. All extant older stone pagodas are sculptured pagodas or columns in the shape of a pagoda. The simple design of the Four Gates Pagoda is typical for one-storey, pavilion-style pagodas: It has a square cross-section delineated by plane side walls. All elements of the structure are symmetrical with four identical sides each facing one of the four cardinal directions. In the center of each wall is a door with straight sides and round arch on top (hence the name). The roof of the pagoda is pyramid shaped. It consists of 23 tiers of overlapping stone slabs and is supported by five tiers of stone eaves. The tip of the roof is occupied by a stone steeple. The overall shape of the steeple resembles a box-shaped pagoda which is carved with Buddhist scriptures and sits on its own Sumeru pedestal with stone corner decorations in the shape of banana leaves. The spire of the steeple is made up of five stone discs. The total height of the pagoda is 10.4 meters; each side is 7.4 meters long.

== Interior ==
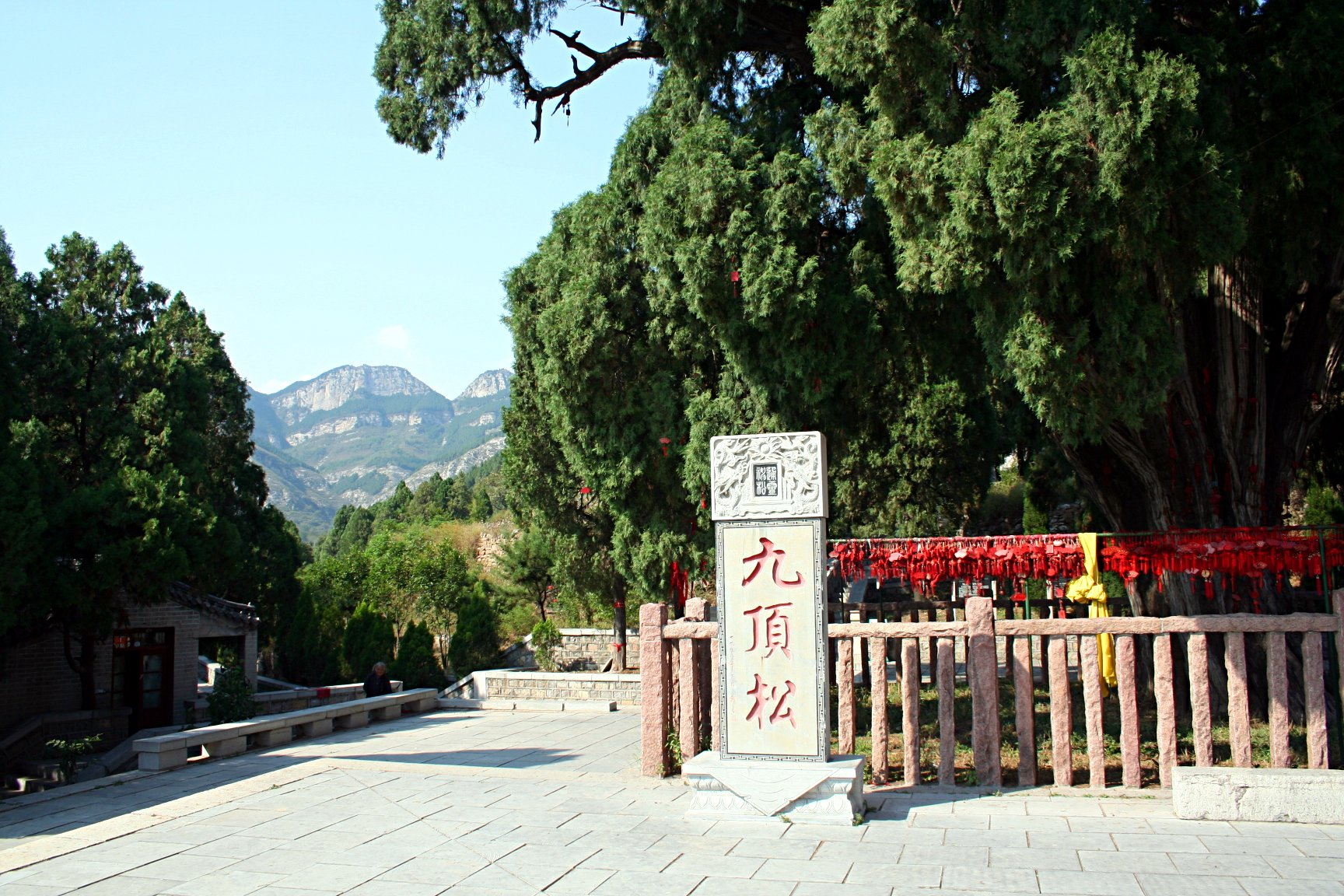
Ancient "Nine-tip pine" near the Four-Gates Pagoda

The interior of the pagoda is dominated by a large central pillar with a square cross-section like the walls of the pagoda, between the surface of the central pillar and the inner side of the walls is a corridor which leads around the entire pillar. The roof of the pagoda is supported by 16 triangular beams which link the outer walls to the central pillar. On each of the four sides of the central pillar, behind the gates, a seated Buddha sculpture is located. The four sculptures are: the "Subtle-voiced" Buddha (Chinese: 微妙聲佛; pinyin: Wēi Miào Shēng Fó) on the northern wall, the Ratnasambhava Buddha (Chinese: 寶生佛; pinyin: Bǎo Shēng Fó) on the southern wall, the Akshobhya Buddha (Chinese: 阿閦佛; pinyin: A Shan Fó) on the eastern wall, and the Amitābha Buddha (Chinese: 無量壽佛; pinyin: Wu Liang Shou Fo) on the western wall. On the base of the statues is a dedication inscription dated to the year 544 AD (during the times of the Eastern Wei dynasty). According to the inscription, a high-ranking military and civil official named Yang Xianzhou (楊顯州) commissioned the Buddha statues to commemorate his ancestors on occasion of the anniversary of his father's death. This suggests that the statues are significantly older than the pagoda which houses them. The pagoda may thus have been built for the purpose of housing these sculptures.

== Surroundings ==
Next to the pagoda stands an ancient pine tree known as the "Nine-tip Pine" (Chinese: 九顶松; pinyin: jiǔ dǐng sōng) or "Thousand Year Pine" since it is believed to be more than thousand years old. Two other pagodas dating from the Tang dynasty stand near the Four-Gates Pagoda: The Dragon-and-Tiger Pagoda and the Minor Dragon-and-Tiger Pagoda.

== See also ==
- Dragon-and-Tiger Pagoda
- Thousand-Buddha Cliff
- Nine Pinnacle Pagoda
- List of sites in Jinan
- Chinese pagoda
