= Guoju Subdistrict =

Guoju Subdistrict 郭巨街道
- Subdistrict
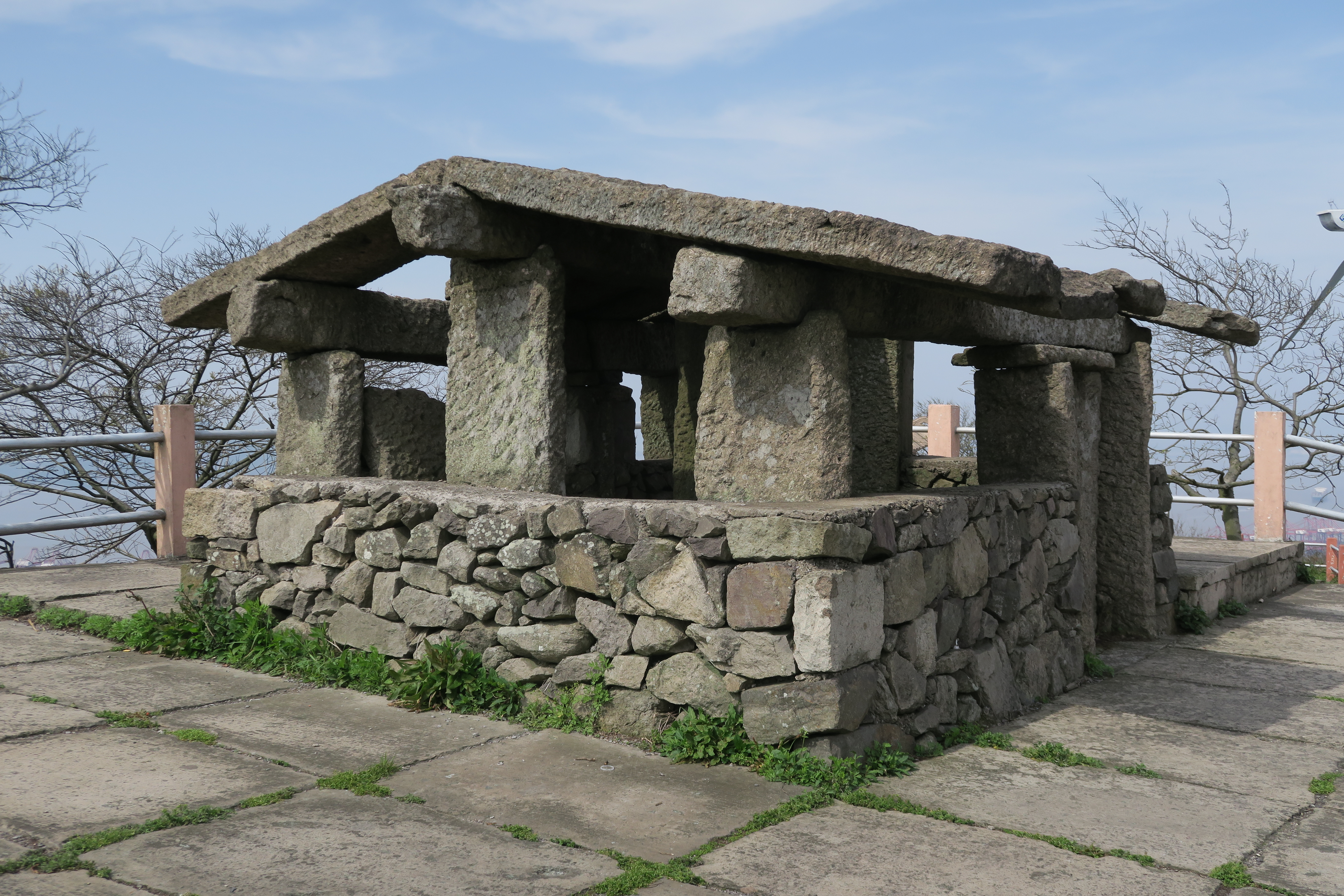
- Ming dynasty beacon on Zongtai Mountain

- Location in Zhejiang
- Coordinates: 29°50′50″N 122°01′50″E
- Country: People's Republic of China
- Province: Zhejiang
- Prefecture-level city: Ningbo
- District: Beilun District
- Time zone: UTC+8 (China Standard)

Guoju Subdistrict (Chinese: 郭巨街道; pinyin: Guōjù Jiēdào) is a subdistrict in Beilun District, Ningbo, Zhejiang province, China. As of 2020, it has two residential communities and 18 villages under its administration.

- Donggang Community (东港社区)
- Fengnan Community (峰南社区)
- Fumin Village (福民村)
- Datutang Village (大涂塘村)
- Ximen Village (西门村)
- Dongmen Village (东门村)
- Beimen Village (北门村)
- Nanmen Village (南门村)
- Jianling'ao Village (尖岭岙村)
- Luting Village (路亭村)
- Shuang'ao Village (双岙村)
- Xiejia'ao Village (谢家岙村)
- Huashi Village (华峙村)
- Dalingxia Village (大岭下村)
- Sheng'ao Village (盛岙村)
- Lianhe Village (联合村)
- Yangzhang Village (洋涨村)
- Changpu Village (长浦村)
- Shuangtun Village (双屯村)
- Changkeng Village (长坑村)

== See also ==
- List of township-level divisions of Zhejiang
