= Thousand-Buddha Cliff =

Coordinates: 36°29′23″N 117°06′26″E

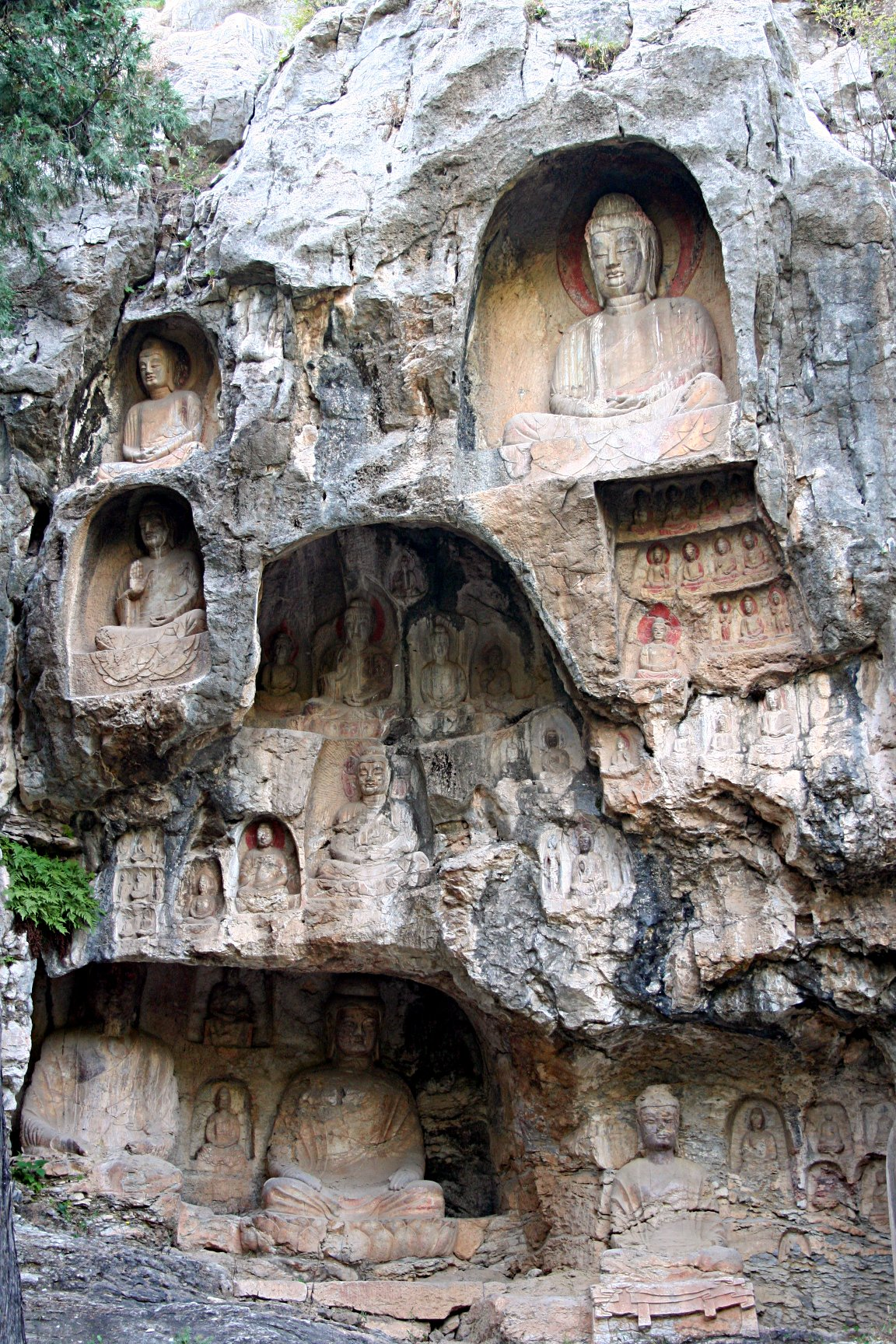
Relief sculptures on the Thousand-Buddha Cliff

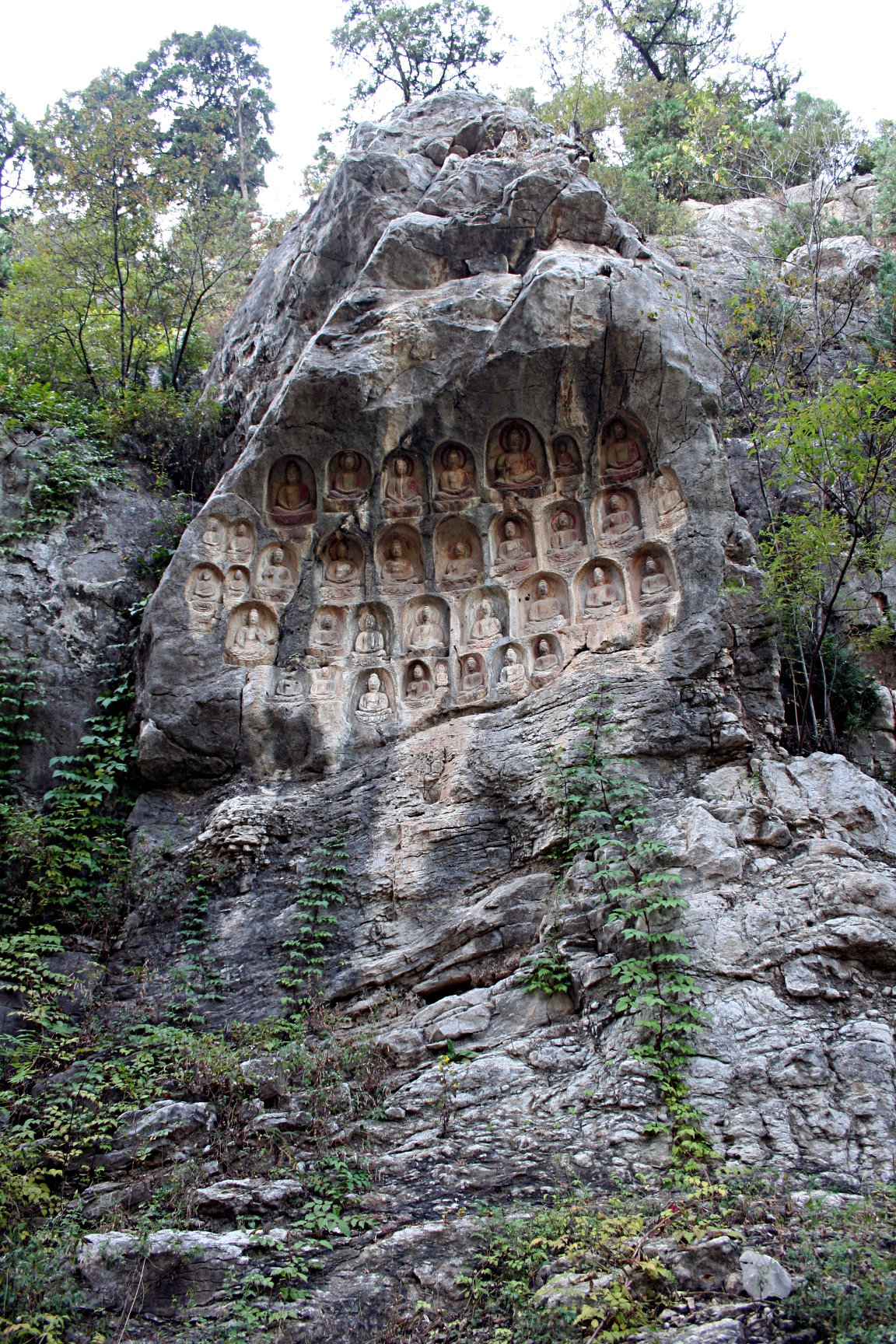
Relief sculptures on the Thousand-Buddha Cliff

The Thousand-Buddha Cliff (Chinese: 千佛崖; pinyin: Qiānfó Yá) is a historical site of mostly Tang dynasty rock carvings in central Shandong Province, China. Along a cliff face of 63 meters length, over 210 statues and 43 inscriptions have been reported. Most of the statues were carved during 618–684.

== Location ==
The Thousand-Buddha Cliff is located near Liubu Village, in Licheng District, under the administration of Jinan City, about 33 kilometres southeast of the city of Jinan proper and eight kilometres east of Zhonggong Town. It stands immediately to the west of the site of the former Shentong Temple (Chinese: 神通寺; pinyin: Shéntōng Sì, meaning "Supernatural Power" Temple), which is now in ruins. The cliff is oriented in the north–south direction.

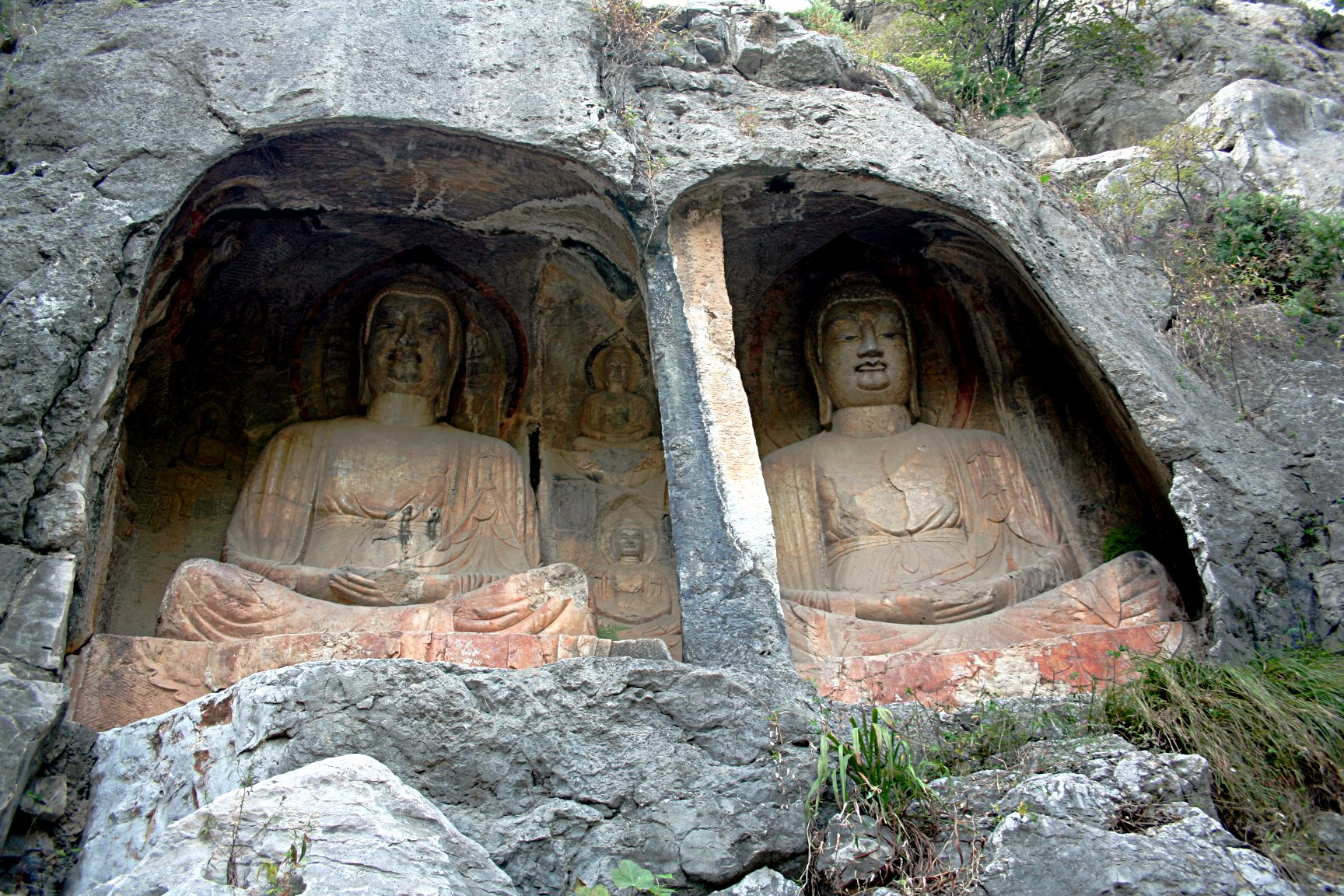
Relief sculptures on the Thousand-Buddha Cliff

== History ==
The first Buddha sculpture is said to have been carved into the cliff by a 70-year-old monk named Sha Dong in the year 619 AD. After a hiatus of 25 years, two more Buddhist sculptures were added by another old monk named Ming De. Because Ming De felt his life was coming to an end at the time, he also donated money towards the carving of additional statues. However, in the year 657 AD he was still alive and continued to carve more statues and inscriptions into the rock face. Because the Tang dynasty's official policy during the time was to encourage conversion to Taoism, the carving of Buddhist statues implied a political risk. Hence, the inscriptions left by Sha Dong and Ming De point out that the sole purpose of the statues was prayer and not the expression of political opinions. Despite these difficulties, the work of carving the sculptures into the cliff was continued by other Buddhists and eventually the Thousand-Buddha Cliff became the largest collection of Buddhist cliff statues in Shandong.

Besides the Buddhist sculptures, there are also secular statues depicting nobility such as relatives of the emperor, government officials, and famous monks. Among those are statues of Princess Nanping (南平公主), the daughter of Emperor Taizong of Tang and her husband Liu Xuanyi.

== See also ==
- Thousand Buddha Mountain (Buddhist site with similar features)
- Four-Gates Pagoda (nearby)
- Dragon-and-Tiger Pagoda (nearby)
- Buddhism in China
- Licheng County
- List of sites in Jinan
