= Nine Dragons =

Nine Dragons may refer to:

- Nine sons of the dragon, from Chinese mythology, with magical functions in human world
- Nine Dragons (painting), a handscroll by Chinese artist Chen Rong
- Nine-Dragon Wall, screen walls featuring nine dragons, a Chinese imperial motif
- Kowloon, a region in Hong Kong
- Nine Dragon River, the Mekong River in Vietnamese especially the Mekong Delta
- Nine Dragons (novel), a 2009 novel by Michael Connelly
- Nine Dragons Paper Holdings Limited, a paper manufacturing company in mainland China
- Nine Dragons (9 Naga), a group of influential businessmen of Chinese descent in Indonesia

== See also ==
- Jiulong (disambiguation)
- Kowloon (disambiguation)
- 九龍 (disambiguation)
