= Cửu Long =

Cửu Long may refer to:

- Mekong River or Cửu Long River, a major river in Southeast Asia
- Mekong Delta or Cửu Long Delta, region in southwestern Vietnam where the Mekong River empties into the sea
- Cửu Long Province, a former Vietnamese province in the Mekong Delta
- 4th Corps (Vietnam People's Army) or Cửu Long Corps, a regular army corps of the People's Army of Vietnam

== See also ==
- Operation Cuu Long 44-02, a 1971 operation by South Vietnamese and Cambodian forces to reopen Route 4 in Cambodia
- Jiulong (disambiguation), Mandarin equivalent
- Kowloon (disambiguation), Cantonese equivalent
- 九龍 (disambiguation), logogram equivalent
