= Qushuiting Street =

Street in Jinan, Shandong, China

Coordinates: 36°40′10.56″N 117°1′6.42″E

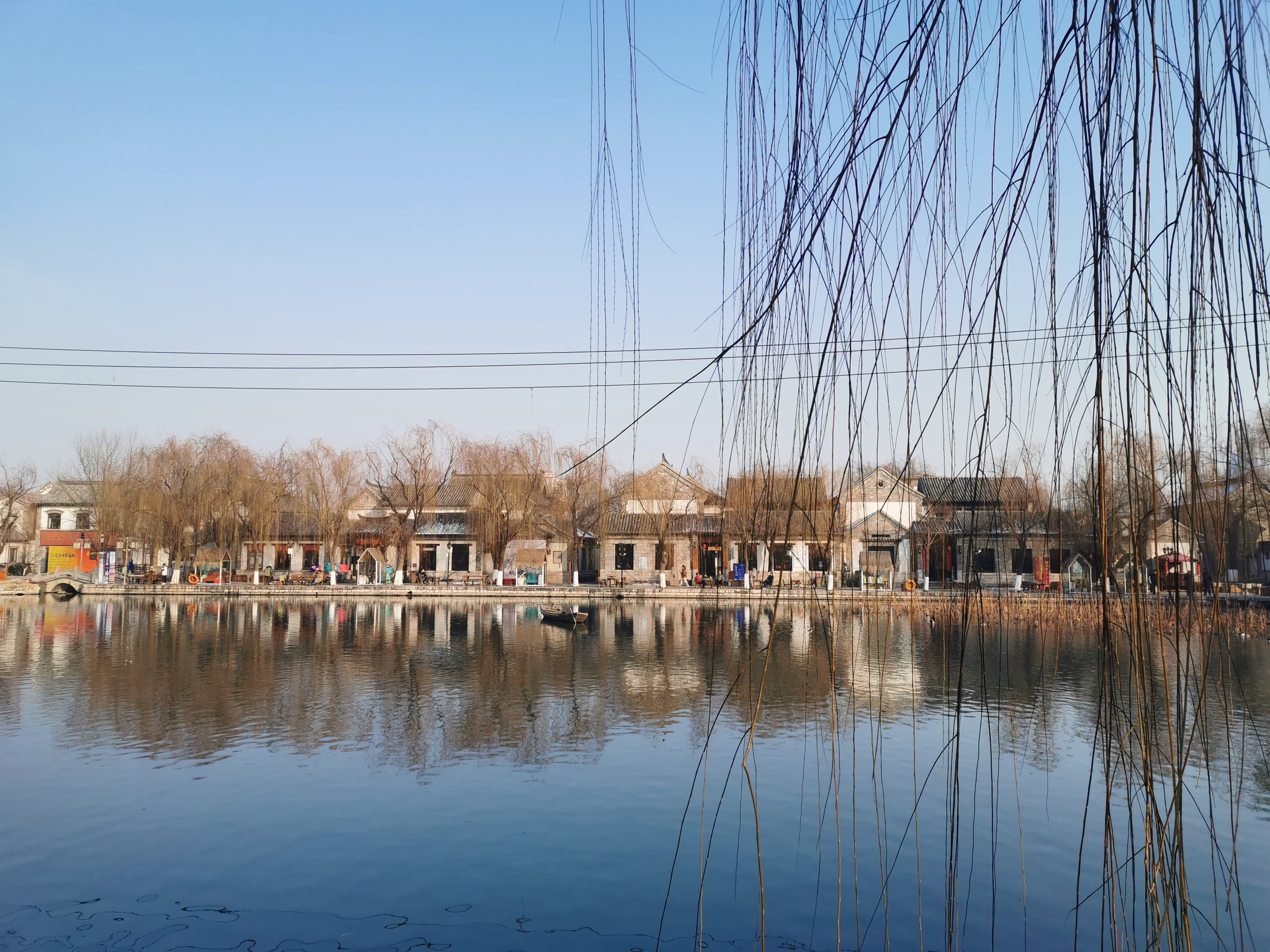
The Hundred-Flower Pond near Qushuiting Street

Qushuiting Street (Chinese: 曲水亭街; pinyin: Qūshuǐtíng Jiē; lit. 'Winding water pavilion street' is a culturally significant alley in the historical center of the City of Jinan, Shandong Province, China. The history of the street can be traced back to the times of the Northern Wei dynasty (386–534).

== Location ==
Qushuiting Street is located in the Lixia District of the historical urban center of Jinan. It is about 520 metres (1,710 ft) long and on average 2.86 metres (9 ft 5 in) wide. The street follows the course of the Winding Water Creek (Qu Shui Creek) that flows northwards from the Palace Pool (spring pool of the Zhuoying Spring) into the Daming Lake. On it course, Qushuiting Street passes by the Fuxue Confucian Temple and the Hundred Flower Pond, before it ends on Daming Lake Road just south of the Daming Lake. The creek and hence the street are lined with willow trees along almost the entire length of the street.

== History ==
The street was the site of an annual festival that has been documented since the times of the Northern Wei dynasty and continued until the beginning of the Qing dynasty (1644–1912): On the 3rd day of the 3rd month of the old Chinese calendar, scholar-bureaucrats gathered at the Palace Pool to ritually cleanse themselves. This was followed by a banquet along Qushuiting Street/Qushui Creek. Cups of alcohol were floated on trays along Qushui Creek. The scholars would sit next to the creek and compose poetry. If a participant's poem displeased the other guests, he would be obliged to drink more alcohol.

== Cultural significance ==
With its open, spring fed water course and willow trees, Qushuiting Street is a symbol of the historical city scape of Jinan that has been described by the late-Qing author Liu E in his novel "The Travels of Lao Can", written 1903–04, published in 1907). In a description that matches Qushuiting Street, Liu E writes that "Every family has spring water, every household has a willow tree" (Chinese: 家家泉水，户户垂杨; pinyin: Jiājiā quán shuǐ, hùhù chuíyáng).

== See also ==
- Water Lily Street
- List of sites in Jinan
