= Fuxue Confucian Temple =

Confucian temple in Jinan, Shadong, China

Coordinates: 36.6703°N 117.0171°E

Fuxue Confucian Temple of Jinan
- 济南府学文庙
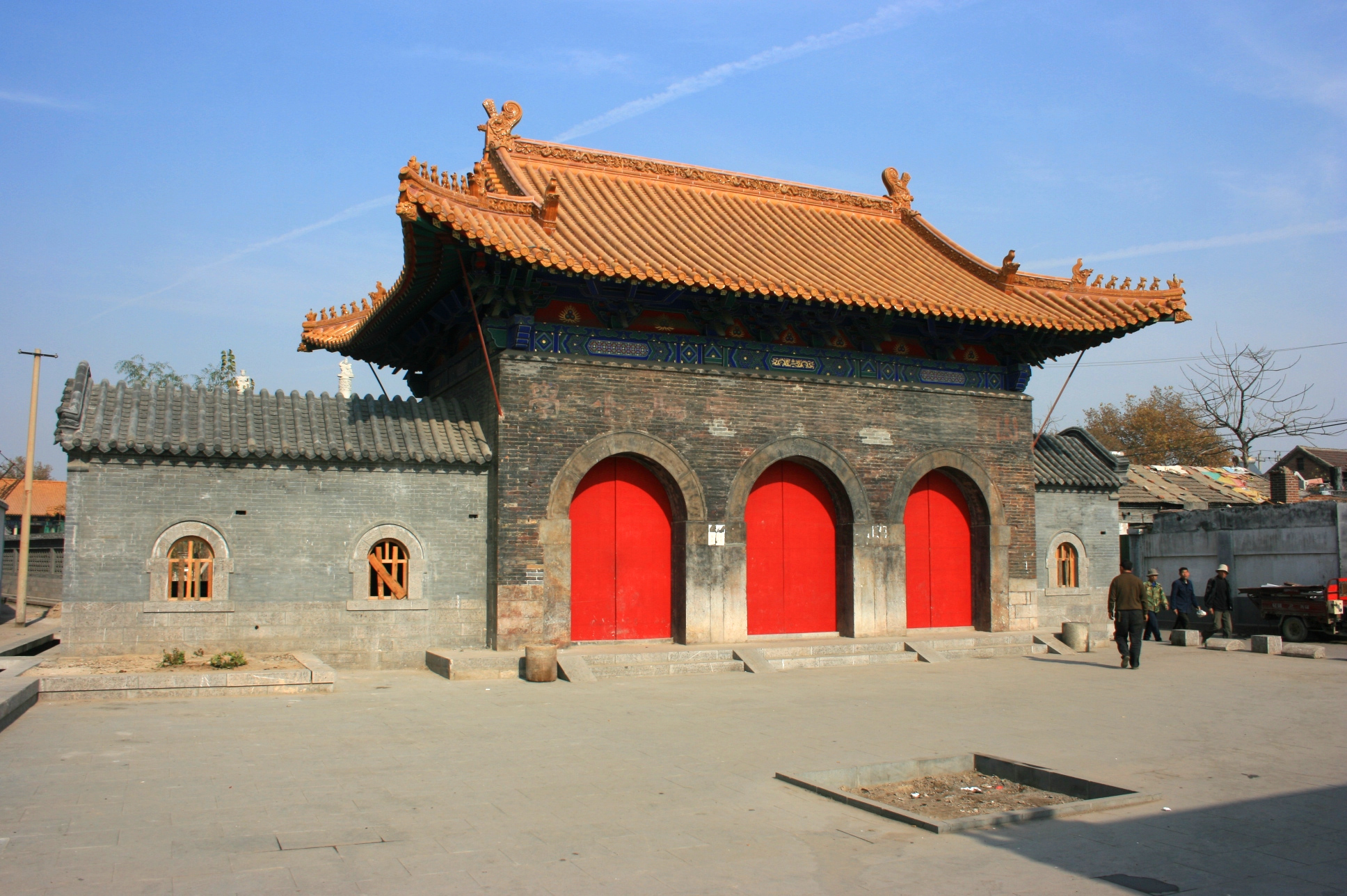
- Dacheng Gate of the Confucian Temple of Jinan

Religion
- Affiliation: Confucianism
- District: Lixia, Jinan

Location
- Location: Shandong, People's Republic of China
- Interactive map of Fuxue Confucian Temple of Jinan

Architecture
- Established: Ming dynasty; registered in 1992

The Fuxue Confucian Temple of Jinan is located in the Lixia District of the Jinan Prefecture, Shandong Province, China, south of Daming Lake and near old city streets such as Furong Street. It was first built during the Xining period of the Northern Song dynasty (1068–1077) and rebuilt in the second year of the Ming Hongwu era (1369). By the time of the Republic of China, it had been expanded and rebuilt more than thirty times. The architectural complex faces north and sits south, with a strict layout and grand scale. Major buildings include the Dacheng Gate, Lingxing Gate, Pan Reservoir, Dacheng Hall, Minglun Hall, and Zunjing Pavilion.

After the establishment of the People's Republic of China, the Confucius Temple was occupied by primary schools, factories, and others, leading to the destruction of many buildings. In 1992, it became a protected cultural site of Shandong Province, and in 2005, major renovations began. Surviving ancient buildings were restored, and demolished parts were reconstructed. After restoration, the Confucius Temple regained its function for Confucian worship and became a core part of Jinan's historical and cultural protection area.

== Location ==
The Confucius Temple is located in the western part of the old city of Jinan, south of Daming Lake. The current protected area of the Confucius Temple, while slightly smaller than its heyday, roughly extends from the south of Minghu Road to the north of the Confucius Temple's shadow wall, from the west of Xihuazhengzi Street, Fuxue West Court Street, and Fuxue West Pavilion Street to the east of Xiangmen Lane and Donghuazhengzi Street. The surrounding streets are mostly named after the Confucius Temple, such as Dong and Xi Huazhengzi Streets, named after the brick patterns used on the temple walls (commonly known as Huazhengzi), and the short street on the north side of the Donghuazhengzi Street is called "Xiangmen Lane" because it is located next to the east gate of the temple, and the short street on the east side of Xiangmen Lane is called Panbi Street because it is located outside the east wall of the temple.

== History ==
The Fuxue Confucius Temple of Jinan was established during the Xining period of the Northern Song dynasty (1068–1077) following the regulations of the Confucius Temple in Qufu, Shandong Province, and is one of the earliest Temples of Confucius. During the Jin period (1213–1216), the temple was destroyed by war and became even more dilapidated by the end of the Yuan dynasty. It was rebuilt in the second year of the Ming Hongwu era (1369). In the tenth year of the Chenghua era (1474), the magistrate Cai Sheng added two pavilions and built Fangshu Screens. In the thirteenth year of the Chenghua era (1477), the censor Liang Ze expanded the main hall and two pavilions, and built Jimen, Lingxing Gate, and Minglun Hall. It was repaired several times afterward. Although it underwent repairs during the Qing dynasty, the basic layout remained unchanged.

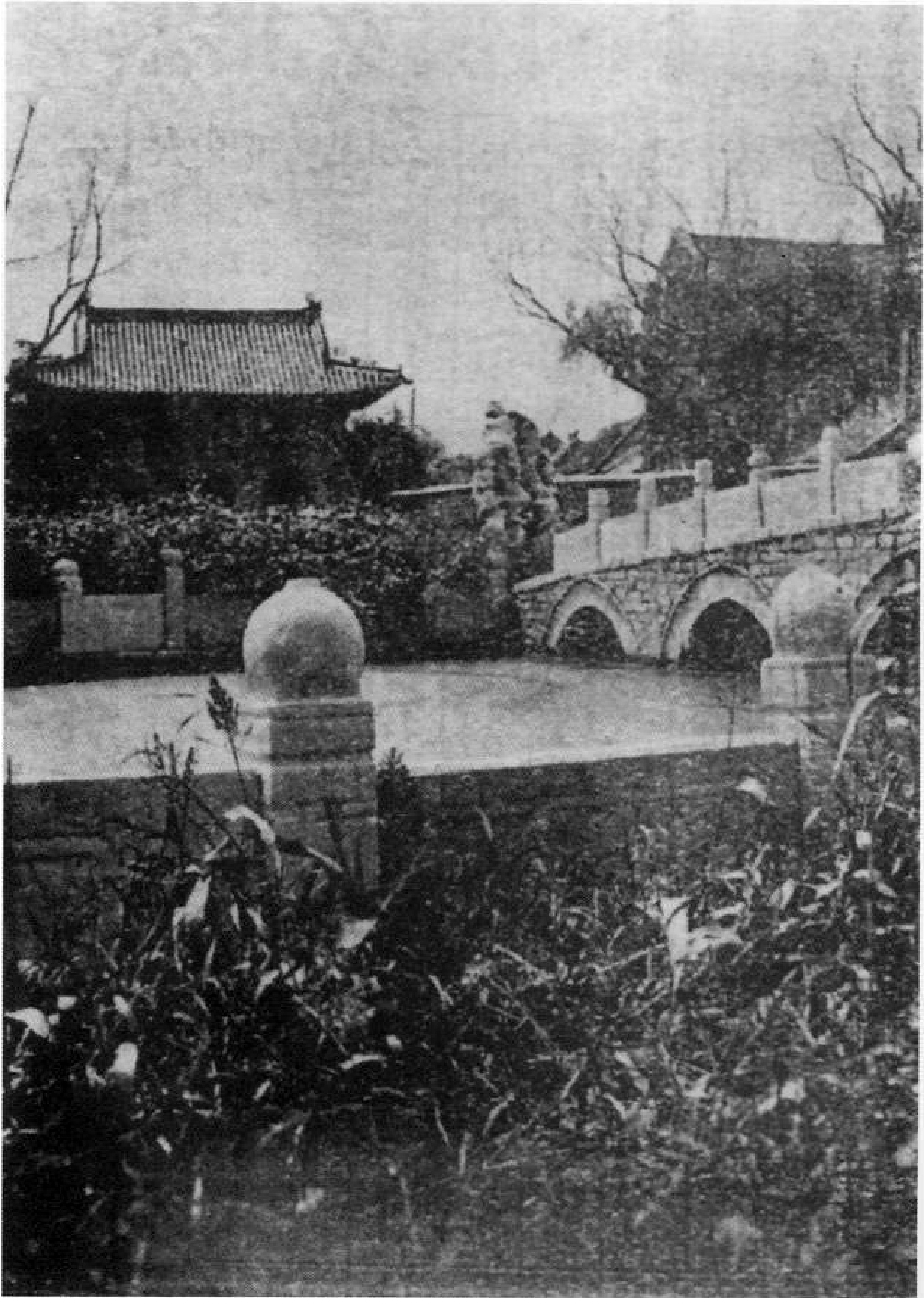
In 1931, the Pan Reservoir was photographed, and in the distance was the Dacheng Gate.

In 1946, the Second Experimental Primary School of Shandong Province was established, using the Confucius Temple as its campus. After the establishment of the People's Republic of China, it was renamed Furong Street Primary School. In 1964, the school demolished buildings such as Minglun Hall and built a three-story office and teaching building, relocating the school gate to No. 248 Daming Lake Road. In 1965, the school was officially renamed Daming Lake Road Primary School.

In February 2003, during the first session of the 11th Jinan Municipal Committee of the Chinese People's Political Consultative Conference (CPPCC), Cui Dayong, Deputy Director of the Municipal Bureau of Culture, submitted a proposal entitled "Proposal to Relocate Daming Lake Road Primary School and Other Units for the Restoration of Fuxue Confucian Temple of Jinan" to the conference. In September of the same year, nine employees of the Shandong Provincial Museum of Culture and History, including Cai Fengshu and Han Mingxiang, jointly wrote a letter to provincial leaders suggesting the restoration of the Temple. In 2004, relevant departments of Jining City began to formulate restoration plans. On September 10, 2005, the "Millennium Restoration" project of Confucian Temple finally commenced, restoring the remaining buildings such as the Dacheng Hall, Pan Reservoir, Dacheng Gate, screen walls, and dressing rooms, and rebuilding other structures. In October 2006, the restoration of the Dacheng Hall was basically completed. On June 9, 2007, the buildings south of the Dacheng Hall were basically completed and opened to the public for one day. By the end of 2007, with the relocation of Daming Lake Road Primary School completed, the demolition of the original teaching building north of the Dacheng Hall and the reconstruction of the temple buildings officially began. In February 2009, the construction of the Zunjing Pavilion's wooden structure was completed.

According to long-term vision planning, reconstruction of ancient buildings such as Qisheng Temple, Jiaoxiao Temple, Wenchang Temple, Xueshu, Kuixing Tower, and Shepu will also be carried out north of the Confucian Temple; while south of the Confucian Temple, the original streets and lanes will be preserved to restore the old cultural atmosphere. After the demolition of buildings on the west side of the Confucian Temple, Minghuan Temple and Xiangxian Temple will also be rebuilt, forming a westward layout parallel to the main axis of the Confucian Temple.

== Structure ==
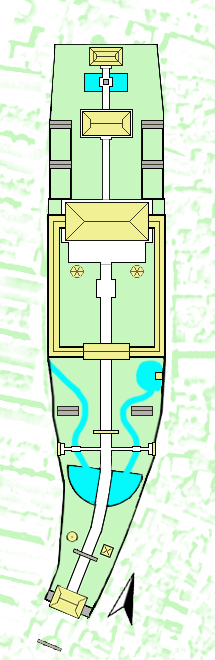
Plan of Jinan Temple of Confucius.

=== Organization ===
According to historical records, the scale of this Confucian Temple is large, with a length of 247 meters and a maximum width of 66 meters. The architectural complex is built around the north–south central axis, with the following buildings along the central axis: screen walls, Dacheng Gate, Lingxing Gate, Pan Reservoir and stone arched bridge, Ping Gate, Ji Gate, Dacheng Hall, Minglun Hall, Huanbi Pavilion, and Zunjing Pavilion.

The screen wall is located south of the temple gate, forming a character "一". Upon entering the temple gate and heading north, there is Lingxing Gate, flanked by square and round pavilions named "Zhongju" and "Zhonggui" respectively. Further north is the semi-circular Pan Reservoir with a stone arched bridge spanning its center. Beyond that is the Ping Gate, with "Zhongying" and "Yuxiu" two pavilions on the east and west sides respectively, and dressing rooms on the east and sacrificial rooms on the west.

Proceeding north is the Ji Gate. Near the eastern wall of the Ji Gate, there is a water pool, and within the pool stands the Fan Jump Pavilion, named "Feiyue Pavilion". Entering the Ji Gate leads to the core building of the Confucian Temple, the Dacheng Hall, flanked by east and west wing halls, forming a closed courtyard. The Dacheng Hall is built on a raised platform, with Imperial Tablet Pavilions on the east and west sides. North of the Dacheng Hall is the Minglun Hall, with two pavilions on each side: Zhidao Hall, Jude Hall, Yiren Hall, and Youyi Hall respectively. Further north is the Zunjing Pavilion, with a water pool in front, and within the pool stands a pavilion named "Huanbi Pavilion". To the east of the Zunjing Pavilion is the Shepu Hall, and to the north are the residences of the instructors and the gate of the Confucian school.

The water of the Pan Reservoir in the Confucian Temple is connected to the water system of Jinan City. The water of Daming Lake flows into the Confucian Temple from the northeast, passes through the water pool of the Fan Jump Pavilion into the Pan Reservoir, then flows out of the Pan Reservoir to the northwest outside the west corridor, around to the water pool in front of the Zunjing Pavilion, then flows eastward and is named "Yudai River". West of the Yudai River, there are buildings such as the Wenchang Pavilion.

=== Architecture ===
==== Dacheng Hall ====
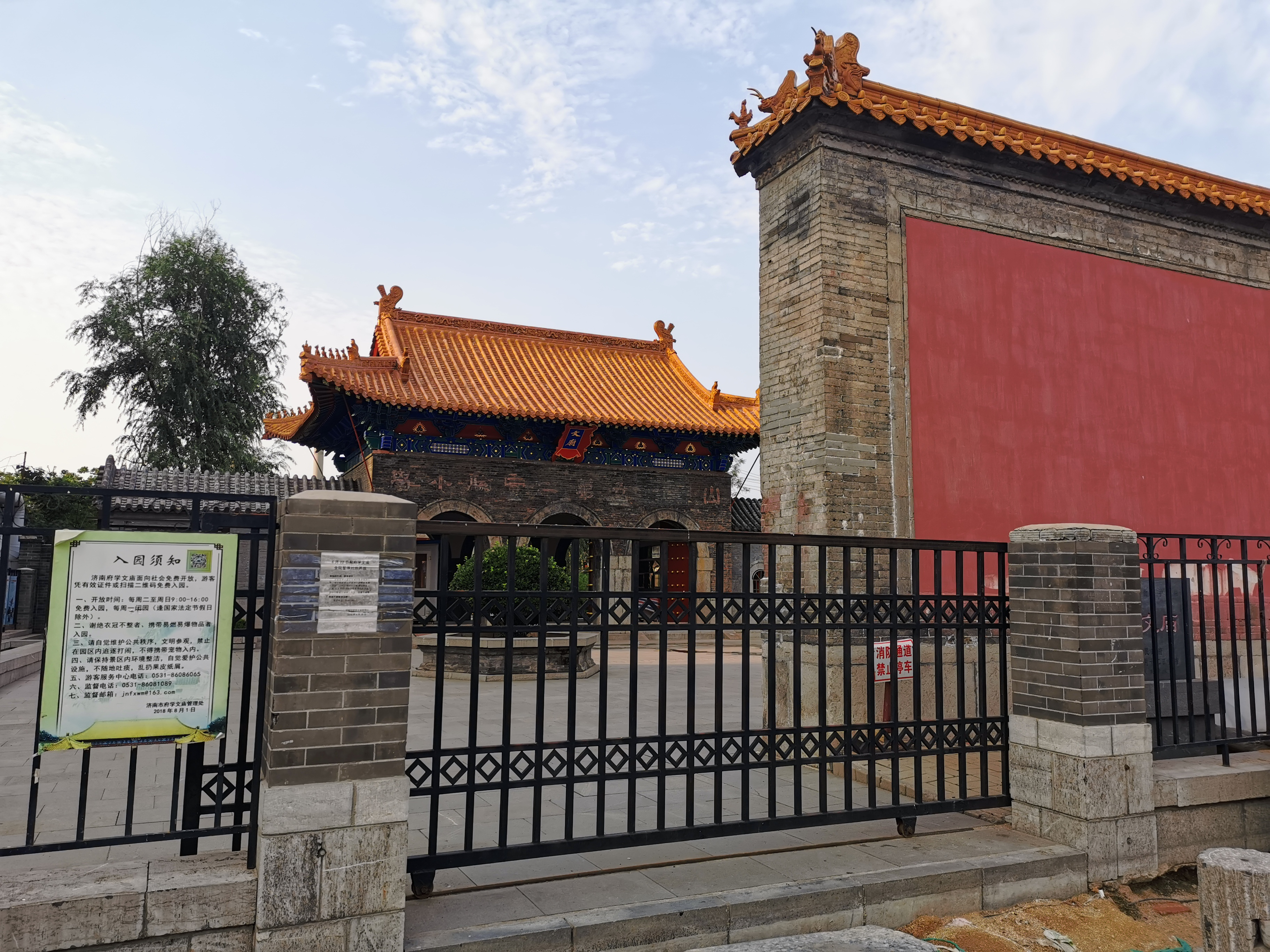
Current Dacheng Gate and screen walls.

The Dacheng Hall of the Jinan Confucian Temple is the largest single ancient building in Jinan City, and one of the largest single-eaved pavilion-roofed ancient buildings still existing in Shandong Province. Its scale ranks third among Dacheng Halls of Confucian temples across China. The hall is nine bays wide, with a width of 34.5 meters from east to west; four bays deep, with a depth of 13.9 meters from north to south; and a height of 13.86 meters, covering an area of approximately 480 square meters. The single-eaved pavilion roof is covered with yellow glazed tile, and the wooden structure follows the lifting beam style, with columns featuring distinct base, corner, and rising parts, retaining the characteristics of Song dynasty architecture. Dougong are decorated with colorful paintings. Inside the hall, a method of reducing columns is used, with different heights for the ceilings, lower for the central and secondary bays, and higher for the end bays. The east, west, and north sides of the hall are surrounded by eaves walls, and the front eaves on the south side each have a six-panel diamond-patterned screen door, while the end bays have diamond-patterned windows.

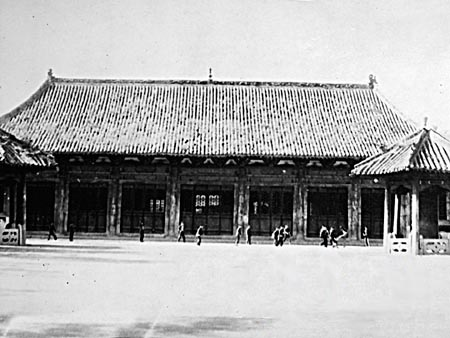
Dacheng Hall and Imperial Tablet Pavilion in the 1950s.

In the center of the hall are statues of Confucius and the Four Sages, with several plaques inscribed by Qing emperors hanging from the ceiling, all destroyed during the Cultural Revolution. In 2005, a fragmentary plaque inscribed by Emperor Yongzheng of the Qing dynasty with the characters "生民未有" was accidentally discovered. In September 2009, a new statue of Confucius, 2.72 meters tall, was officially completed, and later the Four Sages and twelve sages were reinstalled, with statues of Confucius' disciples placed in the east and west corridors on the south side of the Dacheng Hall.

The Dacheng Hall was originally situated on a spacious terrace. With the passage of time, the building has deteriorated, the ridge beasts were smashed during the Cultural Revolution, and the foundation of the hall is now level with the ground, lacking its former grandeur. During the reconstruction, engineers employed the method of "dismantling and raising", which involved completely dismantling the main hall, carefully marking its components, raising the foundation, and then attempting to reuse the original materials as much as possible in the reconstruction. After reconstruction, the Dacheng Hall has been raised by 1.5 meters, restoring its former lofty height.

Originally, there were two imperial stele pavilions in front of the Dacheng Hall, one on each side, hexagonal in shape with yellow glazed tile roofs, built during the Kangxi period. The sites and remnants of these pavilions still exist, and some inscribed steles have been preserved. During the construction of the Dacheng Hall, two stone steles were unearthed in front of the hall.

==== Other buildings ====
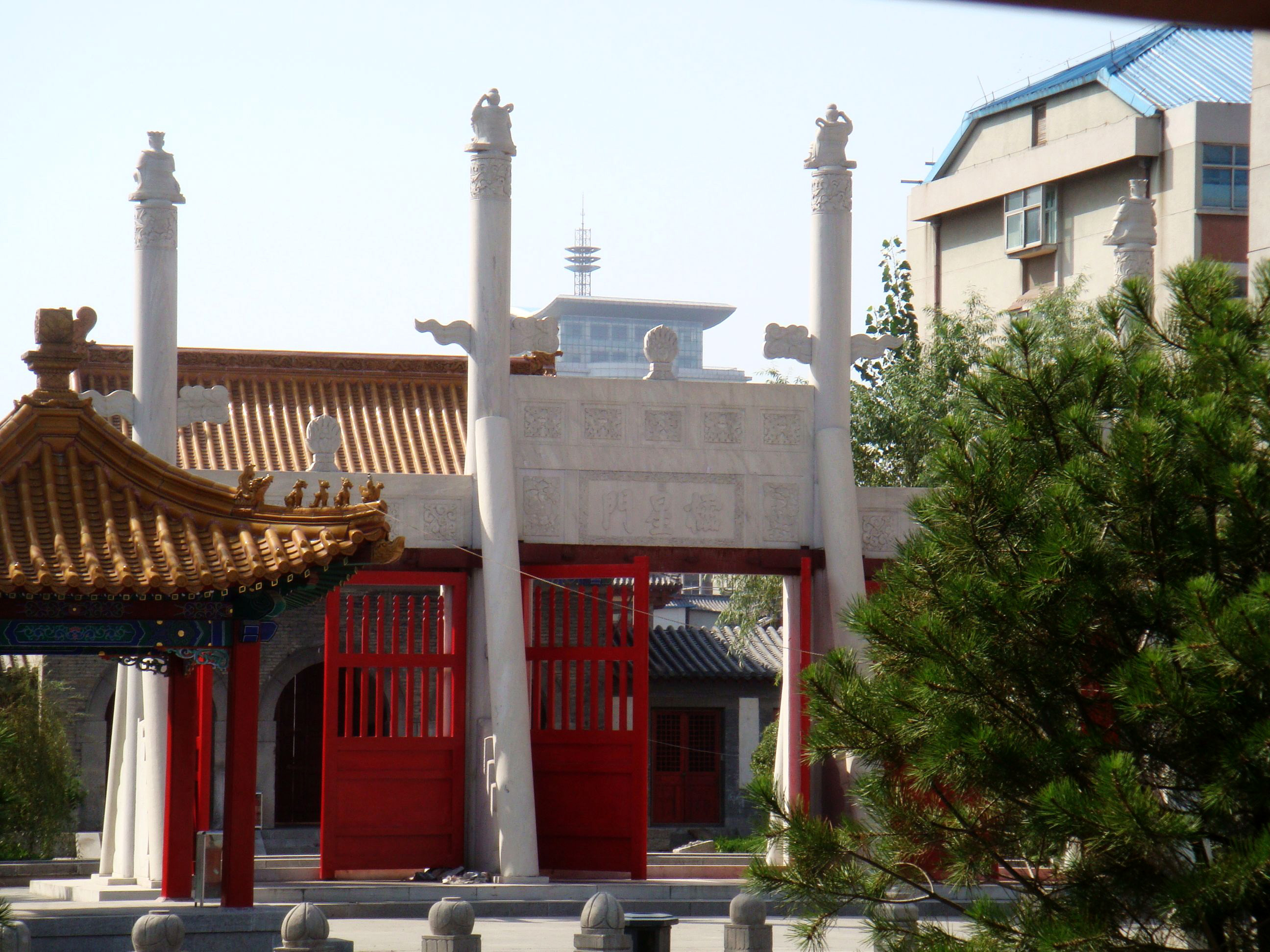
Dacheng Gate, Lingxing Gate, and Zhongju Pavilion.

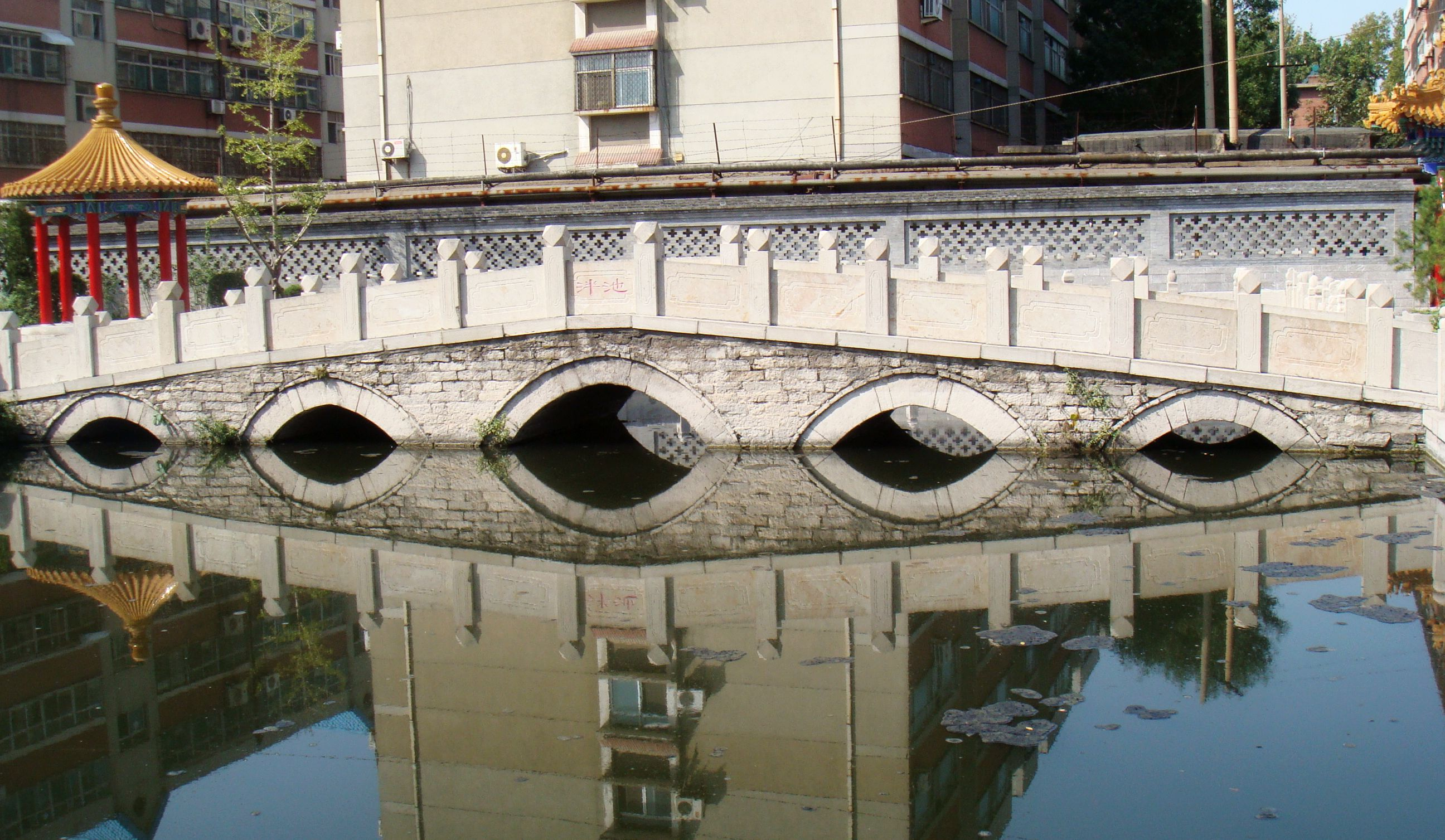
Pan Reservoir, Pan Bridge, and Zhonggui Pavilion.

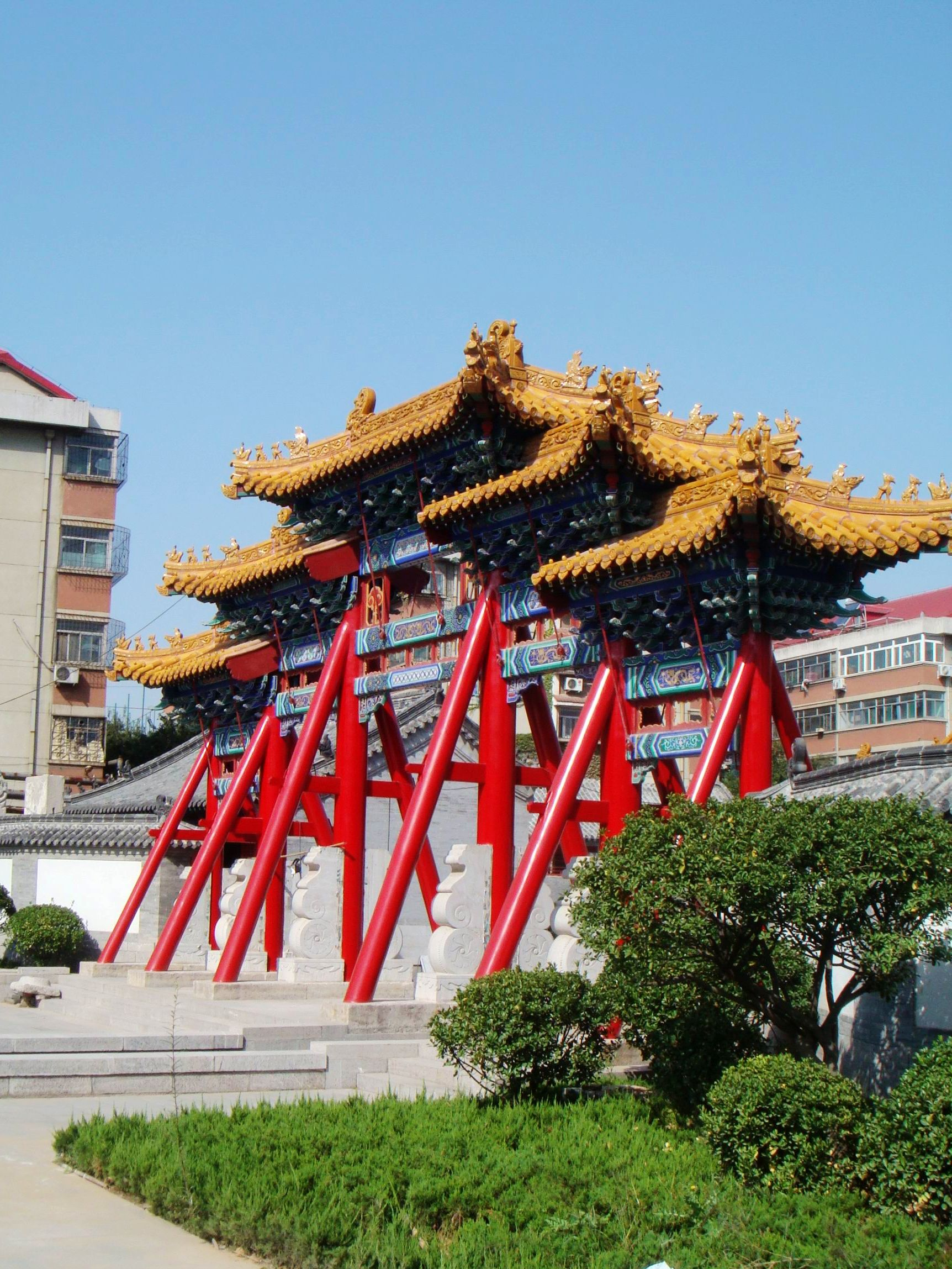
Under reconstruction: Ming Lun Tang and Zunjing Pavilion.

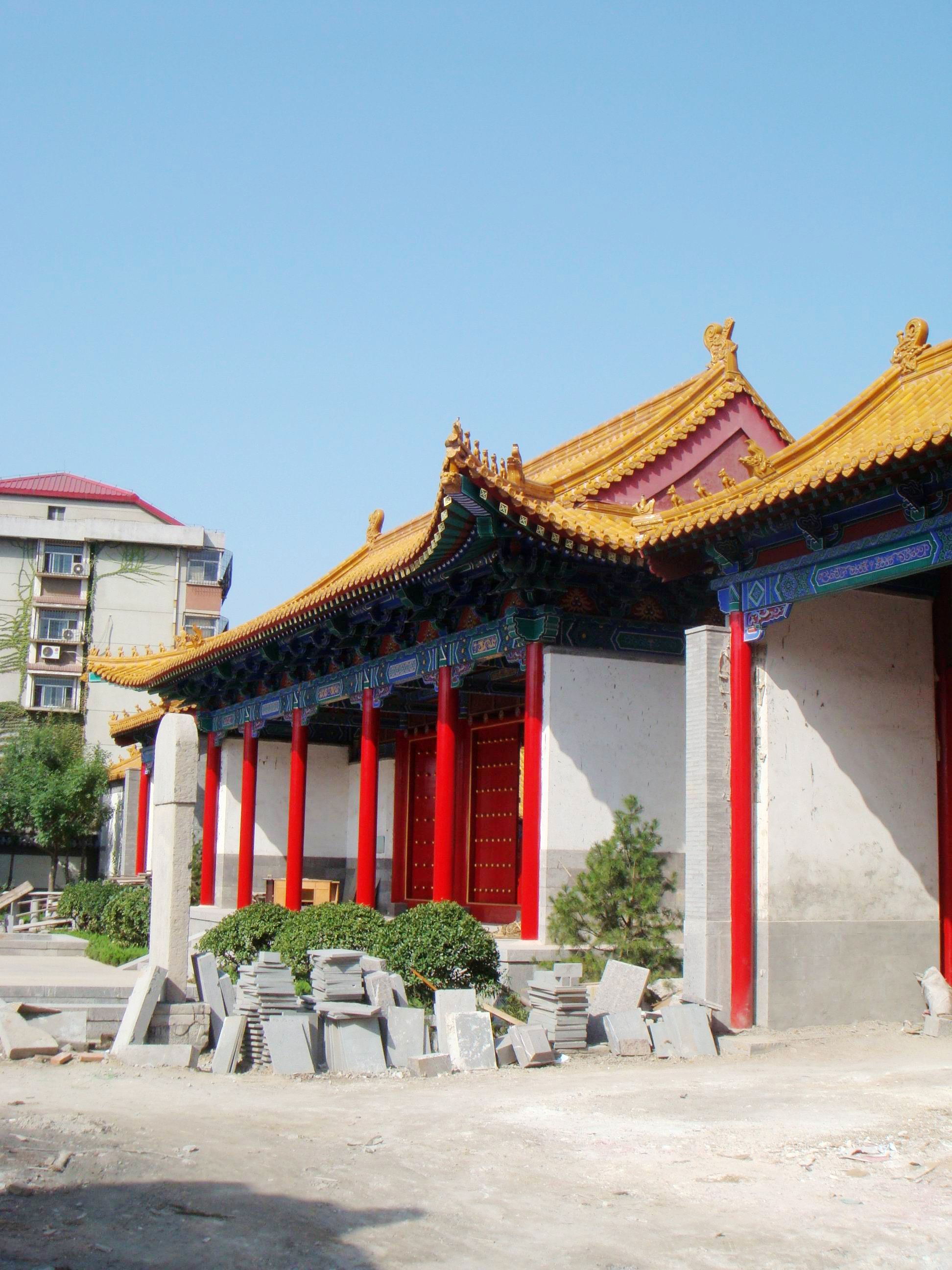
Jimen.

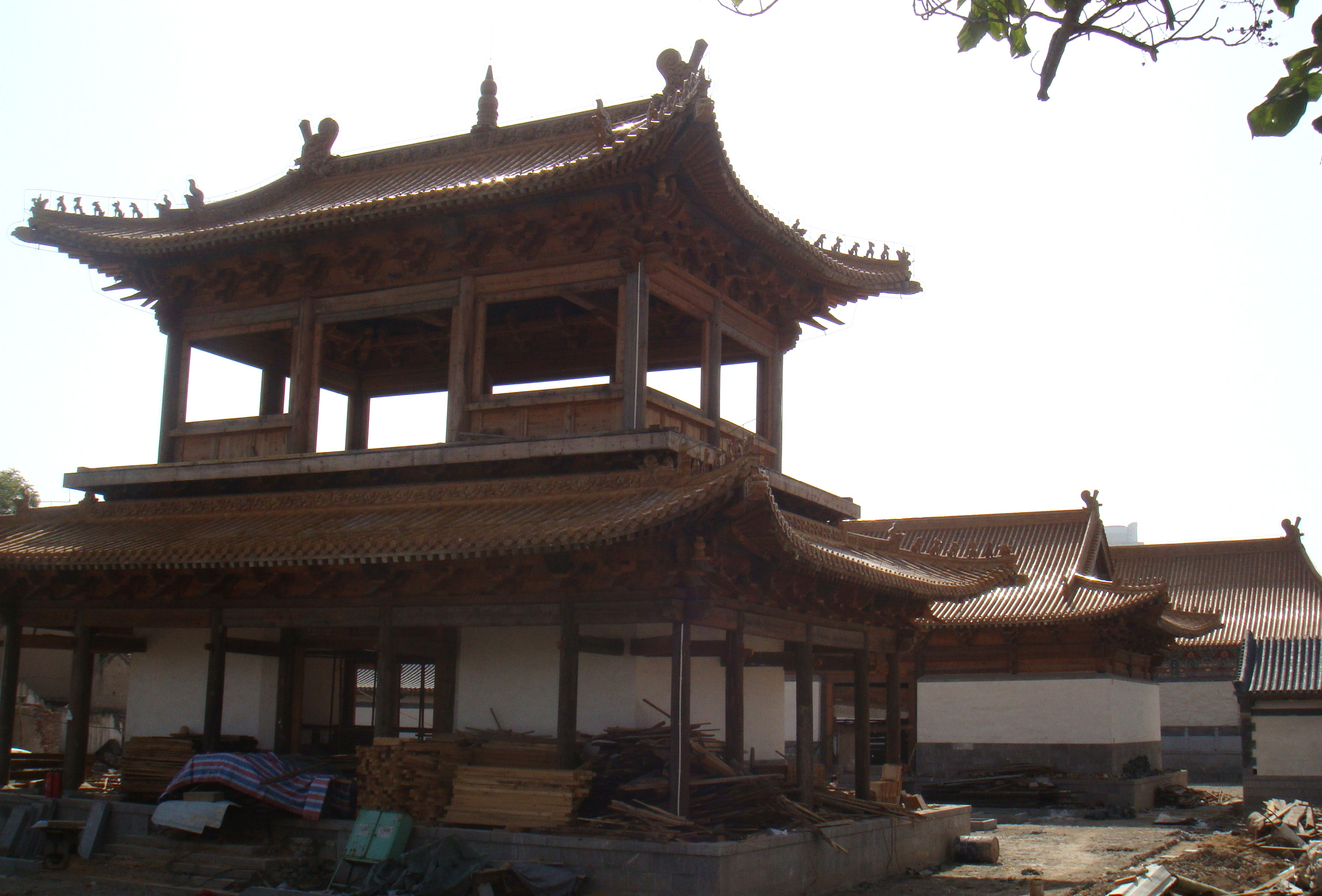
Other buildings within the Confucian Temple.

Building	Description	Reference
影壁 (Spirit Screen)	The Spirit Screen is located outside the Confucian Temple, facing north towards Dacheng Gate. It is 9.85 meters long, approximately 5 meters high, and 0.95 meters thick, made of brick in a "一" shape, with a glazed tile roof. In the center of its north face, there is a circular brick-carved decorative pattern from the Qing dynasty. For decades, it was spared demolition as it served as a retaining wall.	
大成门 (Dacheng Gate)	Dacheng Gate is three bays wide, with each side being 10.8 meters wide, and one bay deep, with a depth of 6.33 meters. It has a single-eave gabled roof covered with yellow glazed tiles. Its external eaves have bracket sets, with a Ming-style flat body second cornice in the central bay and a single cornice in the side bay, with a 45-degree slanted bracket set. The sides do not have flat body cornices and are adorned with colorful, upward-curving bracket sets. The doors of each bay are made of brick and stone, and the floor inside is paved with square bricks.	
棂星门(Lingxing Gate)	Lingxing Gate is a four-pillar, three-bay soaring carved stone archway with red lattice doors between the pillars. The pillars are fronted and backed by stone drums and are supported by leaning stone pilasters. The original Lingxing Gate has been destroyed, and its foundation no longer exists. It was reconstructed by the cultural relics department based on historical records.	
中矩亭、中规亭 (Zhongju Pavilion, Zhonggui Pavilion)	Zhongju Pavilion and Zhonggui Pavilion are located on the east and west sides within Lingxing Gate. Zhongju Pavilion is square, while Zhonggui Pavilion is circular, both with yellow glazed tile pavilion roofs. Their names are derived from the phrases "周旋中规，折旋中矩" from the "Book of Rites" and "方者中矩，圆者中规" from the "Rites of Zhou".	
泮池、泮桥(Pan Reservoir and Pan Bridge)	Pan Reservoir is located a few meters north of Lingxing Gate, nearly semi-circular with its concave side facing south, with a north shore chord length of 37.4 meters. The pond is surrounded by white stone pedestals and pillars. Pan Bridge spans the center of the pond from north to south, a Qing dynasty stone arch bridge, 19 meters long and 2.88 meters wide, with five arches. The central arch is the largest, with symmetrical diminishing arch diameters on each side. During the reconstruction process, construction workers also discovered Ming dynasty Pan Reservoir relics north of the Ping Gate and restored them, creating the rare "twin Pan Reservoir" landscape within the Confucian Temple.	
钟英坊、毓秀坊 (Zhongying Archway, Yuxiu Archway)	Zhongying Archway and Yuxiu Archway are located north of Pan Reservoir, on the east and west sides within the east and west courtyard walls of the Confucian Temple. Zhongying Archway is to the east, while Yuxiu Archway is to the west, facing each other. They are both four-pillar, three-bay, three-story pavilion-roofed wooden archways with yellow glazed tile roofs. At the end of 2007, during maintenance, the sites of the two archways were discovered, extending partially beyond the original school wall, confirming the scale of the ancient Confucian Temple.	
屏门 (Ping Gate)	Ping Gate, serving as the third gate of the Confucian Temple, is a five-bay, six-pillar archway. It has a five-story roof, with three-tiered eaves staggered from the central bay to the sides, a single-eave pavilion roof with bracket sets, covered with yellow glazed tiles, decorated with dragon ornaments, and supported by cloud-head brackets under the eaves, with painted patterns such as "rising sun and cloud crane" and "golden dragon playing with pearl" on the lintel. Each pillar is supported by slanting pillars in front and back, with stone drums as bases. In 1952, the above-ground part of the archway was relocated to the south gate of Daming Lake Park. It was reconstructed at its original location in 2007.	
更衣所、牺牲所Dressing Room, Sacrifice Hall	On the east and west sides of Ping Gate are the Dressing Room and Sacrifice Hall, respectively. Before the Confucian sacrifice, the chief officiant must bathe and change clothes in the Dressing Room and fast for three days. The Dressing Room is an original building, which underwent dismantling and repair in 2006. The Sacrifice Hall was used for preparing sacrificial items for the Confucian ceremony. The original building was demolished, and it was reconstructed in 2006 according to historical records.	
戟门 (Jimen)	Jimen is the main gate leading to the courtyard in front of Dacheng Hall. It is five bays wide, with a gabled roof covered with yellow glazed cylinder tiles. Originally, it was connected to the corridors on both sides, forming a closed courtyard with Dacheng Hall. During reconstruction, the originally lower corridors on both sides were heightened and separated from Jimen for fire prevention purposes.	
(东西廊庑) East and West Corridors	The East and West Corridors are long rows of winged houses on the left and right sides in front of Dacheng Hall, facing each other and enclosing a closed courtyard with Dacheng Gate and Dacheng Hall. These corridors were originally collapsed due to long-term disrepair in the 1950s. During major renovations in 2006, construction workers discovered their brick-paved foundations and rebuilt them accordingly.	
(明伦堂) Ming Lun Tang	Ming Lun Tang is five bays wide with a single-eave gabled roof, decorated with painted brackets under the eaves. It served as the place for educational activities within the Confucian Temple, embodying the concept of "combining temple and school". In the 1950s, it was demolished to build a school building. It has now been reconstructed at its original location north of Dacheng Hall, based on historical records, and will serve as a place for traditional Chinese studies. To achieve this, the internal columns were reduced in number to increase classroom space.	
(尊经阁) Zunjing Pavilion	Zunjing Pavilion is where classics are stored within the Confucian Temple. The Zunjing Pavilion of the Confucian Temple was originally a double-eave gabled roof building, which once housed many stone steles but is no longer extant. In the 1950s, only the ruins of the original Zunjing Pavilion remained. Due to the lack of detailed architectural specifications, the Confucian Temple maintenance command began reconstruction	

== Inscriptions and stone carvings ==
In the 1950s, there were still 27 Ming and Qing stone steles preserved in the Confucian Temple, including seven plaques in the Dacheng Hall, one plaque in the Minglun Hall, and several other stone carvings. During the Cultural Revolution, most of these cultural relics were destroyed. By the time of the survey in 1982, only a few survived, including the "Reconstruction of the Steles of the Confucian Temple of Jinan" from the Tongzhi period of the Qing dynasty and the "Prohibition of Teaching and Guidance for Jinan Fuxue Professors and Tutors" from the Daoguang period.

In addition, in 1991, during the repair of buildings at Daming Lake Road Primary School, an important stone carving was unearthed, namely the "Portrait of the Venerated Sage" stele. This stele was originally erected near the Dacheng Hall. The inscription in seal script on the stele reads "Portrait of the Venerated Sage," and it is recorded that "Wu Weiyue imitated the brushwork of Wu Daozi to depict the image of the Venerated Sage." In the center, there is an intaglio carving of Confucius teaching, and on the lower right side, there is an inscription in clerical script stating "Brushwork of Wu Daozi." This stele is currently housed in the Jinan Museum.

== See also ==
- Temple of Confucius, Qufu
- Confucius
