= Screen wall =

Screen wall may refer to

- False front, a facade intended to disguise the true nature of the building
- Spirit screen in the Chinese architecture
