= Baihua =

Baihua may refer to:

== Languages ==
- Baihuawen (白話文), the written literary form of Modern Chinese languages
- The suffix of some Cantonese dialects (**白話), for instance, "Nanning Cantonese" (南寧白話)
- Pe̍h-ōe-jī (白話字), a romanization for Southern Min language
- Bai language (白語), the language in Yunnan, China, used by the Bai people
- 白話, meaning "idle talk, empty words or trivial chat" in Chinese.

== Places in China ==
- Baihua, Guangdong (白花), a town in Huidong County, Guangdong
- Baihua, Sichuan (白花), a town in Yibin, Sichuan
- Baihua Township (白桦乡), a township in Daxing'anling Prefecture, Heilongjiang
- Hundred Flower Pond, also known as Baihua Pond, a small artificial lake in Jinan, Shandong

== See also ==
- Bai Hua (白桦, 1930–2019), Chinese author
- 白話字 (disambiguation) (báihuàzì), meaning "vernacular script"
