= Datong Prince's Palace =

Ming Dynasty palace in Datong, China

Coordinates: 40°05′43″N 113°17′51″E

Drone footage of the Prince's palace

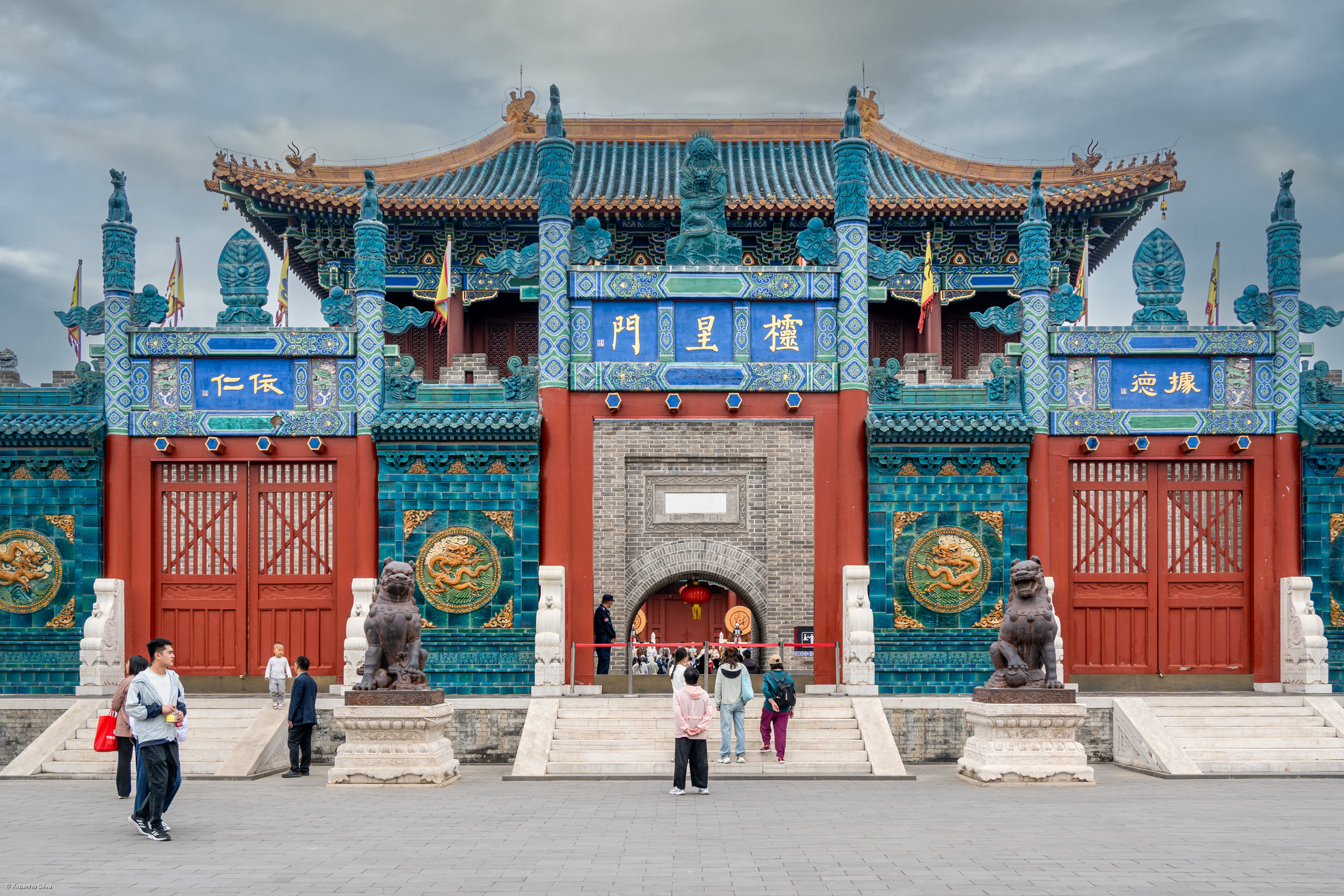
Entrance to the Prince's palace

Datong Prince's Palace, also known as the Residence of Prince Dai (Chinese: 代王府; pinyin: Dài Wángfǔ), is a former Ming dynasty princely palace in Datong, Shanxi, China. Built in the 1390s for Zhu Gui, prince of Dai, the thirteenth son of Hongwu Emperor, it served as the seat of a powerful border princedom guarding the northern frontier of the Ming empire. The palace was similar in construction to the Forbidden City in Beijing, but was constructed 25 years earlier. After prince Zhu Gui, ten other princes followed. Although the original complex was largely destroyed in the mid-17th century, the site today contains a monumental Nine-Dragon Screen and an extensive twenty-first-century reconstruction of the palace compound.

== History ==
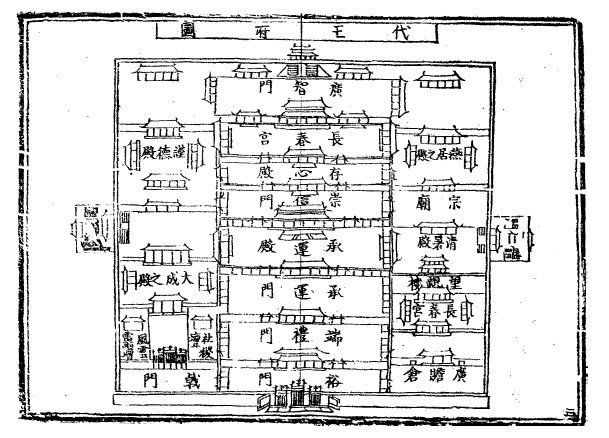
A historical map of the Prince's Palace

In 1391 the Hongwu Emperor reassigned his son Zhu Gui from Nanchang to Datong and invested him as Prince of Dai, entrusting him with the defence of a key section of the Great Wall frontier. The following year, construction began on a new princely residence on the site of the former Guozijian (Imperial Academy) of the Liao and Jin dynasties in Datong’s western capital area. The palace was largely completed by 1396.

Datong, known historically as Pingcheng, had played important roles as a regional capital under the Northern Wei and as a secondary capital under the Liao and Jin. The establishment of the Prince of Dai’s seat there reflected the Ming court’s strategy of using imperial kinsmen as military governors along the empire’s borders. Over the following two and a half centuries, eleven successive Princes of Dai resided in the palace, combining ceremonial, administrative and military functions.

In 1644, during the widespread uprisings that accompanied the collapse of the Ming dynasty, the rebel leader Li Zicheng captured Datong. The last Prince of Dai, Zhu Chuanxun, was killed and the palace complex was largely consumed by fire. By the early Qing period local gazetteers already described the residence as ruined, noting only the survival of a large yellow-glazed screen wall depicting nine dragons.

== Layout and architecture ==
Contemporary descriptions and later gazetteers portray the Datong Prince’s Palace as a walled city-like complex aligned along a north–south axis. The compound measured nearly 700 metres from north to south and more than 260 metres from east to west, enclosing roughly 180,000–190,000 square metres behind high, thick walls, which led later writers to compare it to a “miniature Forbidden City”.

Like the imperial palaces in Nanjing and Beijing, the residence was divided into an outer court (waichao) for official ceremonies and an inner court (neiting) for domestic life. In the outer court, halls such as the Chengyun Hall (承运殿), Yuan Hall (圜殿) and Cunxin Hall (存心殿) formed the core ceremonial and administrative spaces where audiences, rituals and governmental business were conducted. The inner court contained the residential quarters of the prince and princess consort, including the Changchun Palace (长春宫), Jiaotai Hall (交泰殿) and Kunning Palace (坤宁宫).

The main axis was flanked by subsidiary axial groups of buildings, including ancestral temples, ritual altars and service facilities such as kitchens, stables and workshops. In total the palace is reported to have comprised over twenty palatial compounds and some 800 rooms. The buildings were characterised by red walls and blue-green glazed roof tiles, echoing imperial colour schemes while marking the complex as a princely rather than imperial residence.

== Nine-Dragon Screen ==
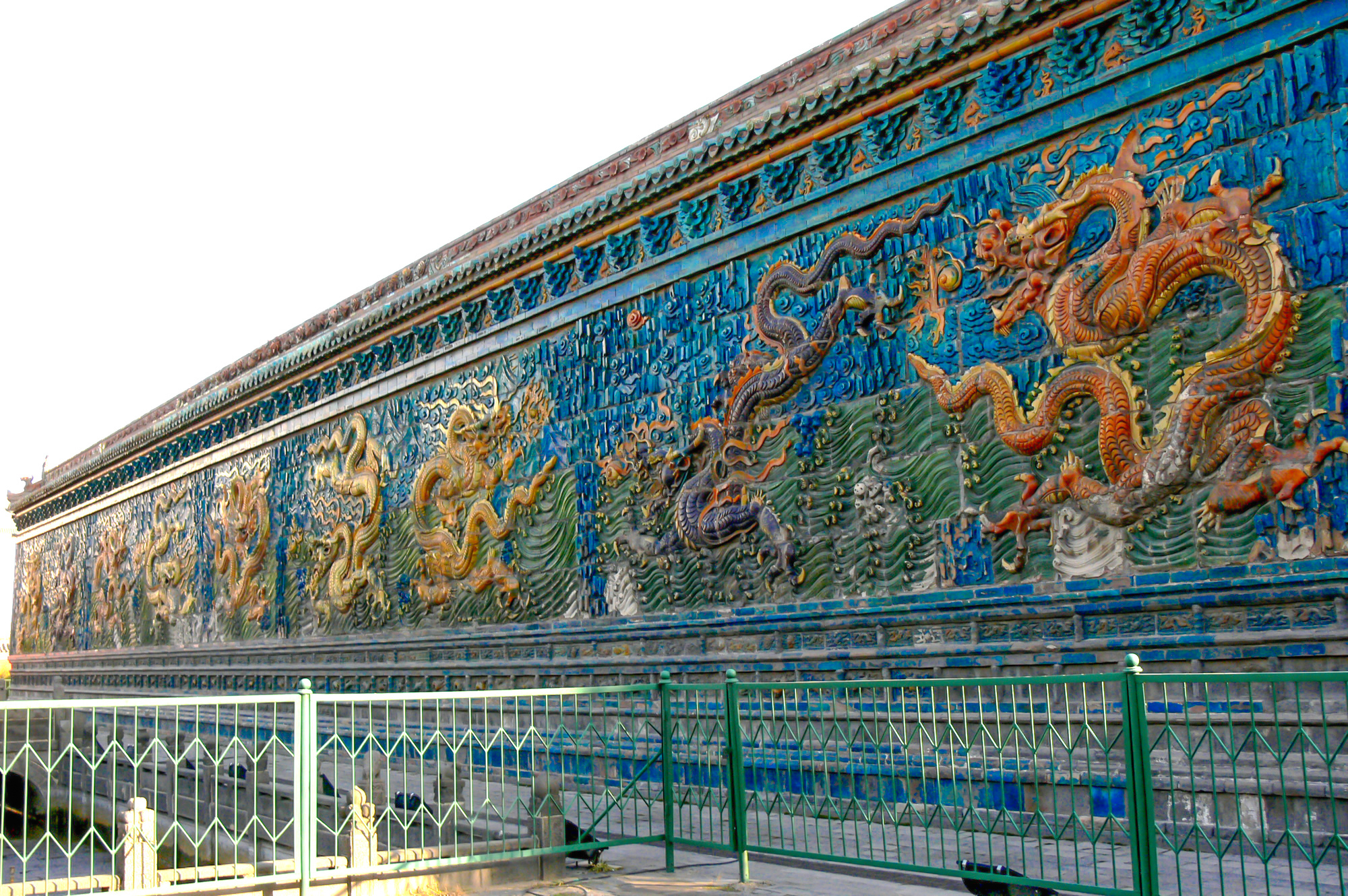
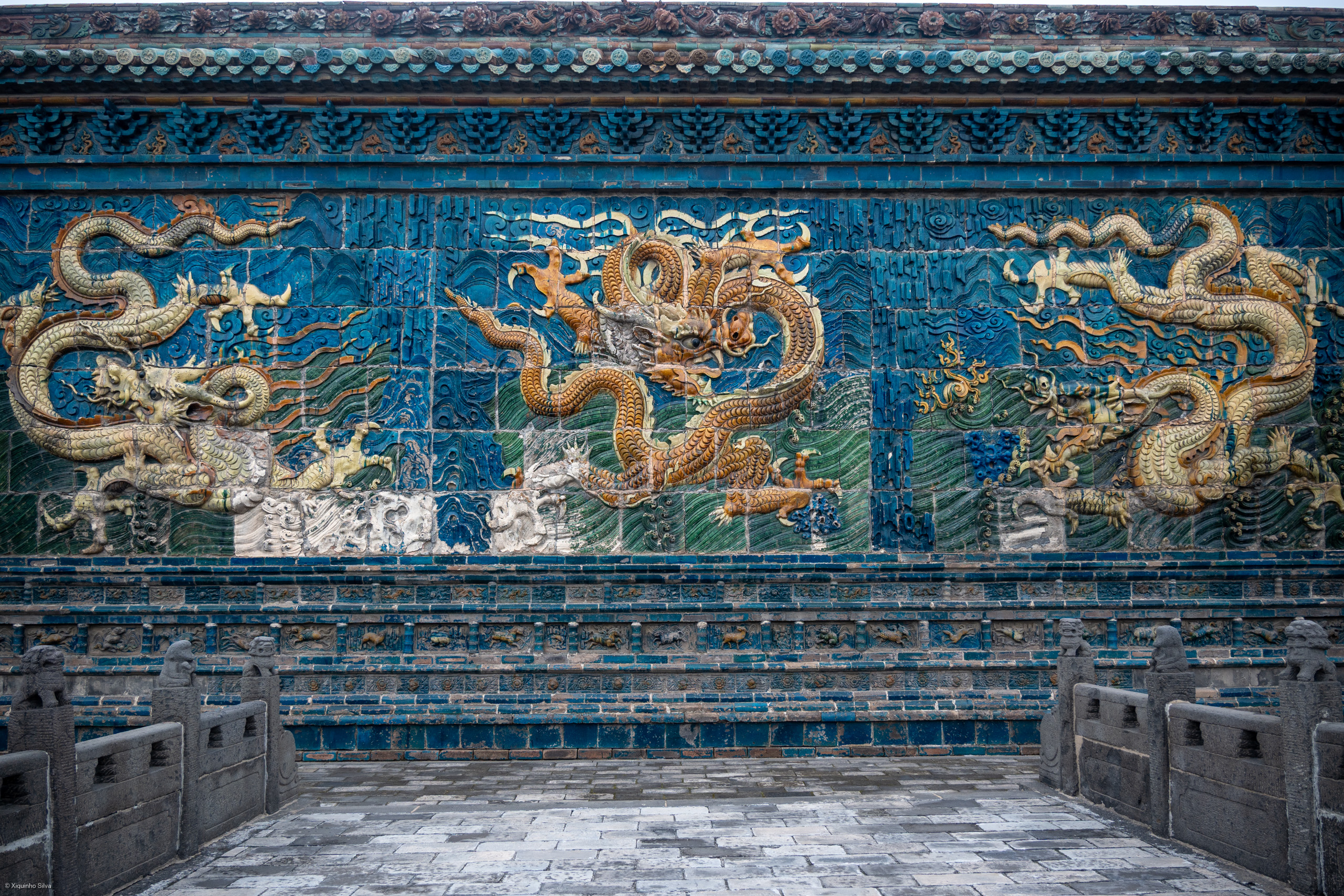
The Nine-Dragon wall facing the Palace (top) and a closeup view (bottom)

The most prominent surviving original feature of the palace is the Datong Nine-Dragon Screen (九龙壁; Jiǔlóng bì), a large glazed screen wall that originally stood in front of the southern palace gate. Erected in 1392 for Zhu Gui’s residence, it measures about 45 metres in length, 8 metres in height and just over 2 metres in thickness. The screen is constructed from more than 400 polychrome glazed ceramic tiles and depicts nine large dragons in high relief, surrounded by clouds, waves, rocks and smaller animal figures.

Scholars generally describe it as the earliest and largest surviving Nine-Dragon Screen in China, predating similar screens in Beijing and other cities. The wall survived the 17th-century destruction of the palace and was later relocated a short distance to accommodate modern road construction; it has since been designated a nationally protected cultural relic and is one of Datong’s best-known landmarks. These types of walls were designed to protect palaces from evil spirits and negative energy.

== Destruction and later fate ==
The palace was gutted during the social breakdown at the end of the Ming dynasty in 1644, when the peasant rebellion under Li Zicheng reached Datong. After the fires, the palace remained in ruins. Qing-period records refer to the site as the former residence of the prince, noting the loss of its halls and gates and the survival of the glazed screen wall. Over the 19th and 20th centuries, the area was gradually built over with streets and residential neighbourhoods as Datong expanded, leaving only fragmentary traces of foundations and architectural components in situ.

== 21st-century reconstruction ==
In the early 2010s the municipal government of Datong launched a large-scale urban renewal project aimed at “reviving” the Ming- and Qing-period old city. As part of this programme, the Datong Prince’s Palace was reconstructed on its original site beginning in 2011, using local gazetteers such as the Datong Fuzhi, surviving architectural elements and Ming-style design principles as references. The rebuilt complex, often referred to as the “new Prince of Dai’s Palace”, covers around 190,000 square metres and features an array of halls, gates and pavilions arranged along three main north–south axes, with red walls and blue-green tiled roofs.

The reconstruction coincided with the rebuilding of Datong’s city walls and large areas of Ming-style residential and commercial streetscapes. The project, which required the demolition of extensive existing housing and the relocation of tens of thousands of residents, has attracted international attention. Supporters argue that it has revived Datong’s historic urban identity and boosted tourism, while critics have questioned the loss of authentic historical fabric and described the new constructions as “fake relics” and an extreme example of replica-based heritage development.

Today the rebuilt palace functions primarily as a tourist attraction and cultural venue, hosting exhibitions, performances and festivals that present the history of the Ming border princedom and of Datong as a frontier city. Guided tours typically combine visits to the palace with the Nine-Dragon Screen and the nearby city wall, temples and museums of the Datong Ancient City scenic area.

== Literature ==
- Kim Hunter Gordon (2013) "Datong : A Historical Guide", China Atomic Energy Press/ Matric International Publishing - ISBN 978-7-5022-6144-3
