= Furong Street =

Street in Jinan, Shandong, China

Coordinates: 36°39′53.73″N 117°1′2.09″E

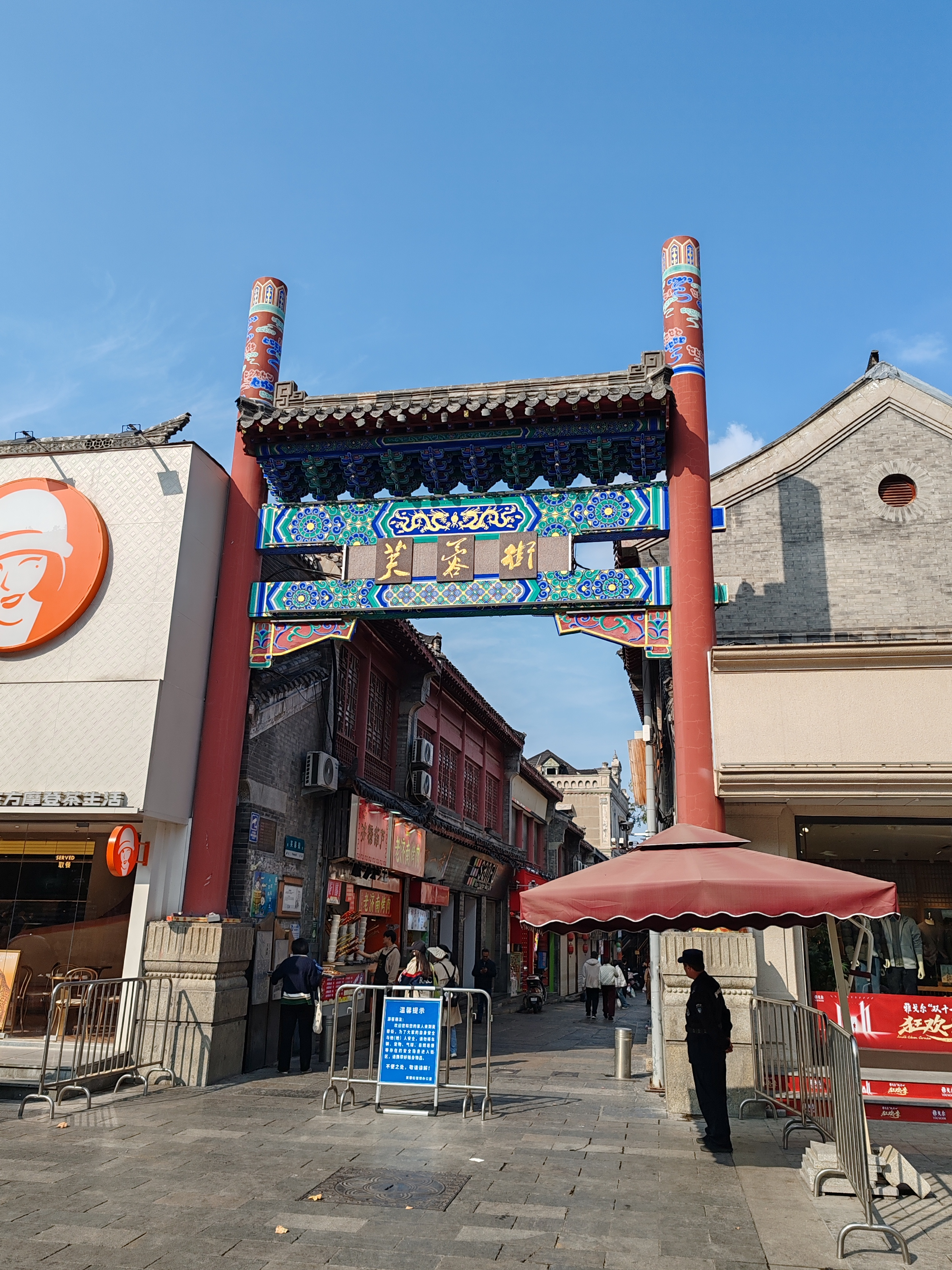
Water Lily Street looking

The Furong or Water Lily Street (Chinese: 芙蓉街; pinyin: Fúróng Jiē) is a historical business street located in the central area of the old city of Jinan, Shandong, China. With a history that can be traced back for more than 2000 years, the street formerly served as the administrative, financial, commercial, and cultural center of the city.

Furong Street runs through the historical center of Jinan in the north-south direction. To the north, it ends at the Fuxue Confucian Temple and to the south at Quancheng Street, a modern shopping area. The street has a total length of 432 meters and is on average 4.6 meters wide.

As the street has a long creek with clear water, it became a gathering place for business people and several wealthy residences were constructed in the surrounding area. Together with the nearby Qushuiting Street (to the north), Furong Street formed the most prosperous area in historical Jinan.

The street became a residential area and retail shops moved in when a yamen was established in the 5th year of the reign of the Kangxi Emperor (in the 1660s). At the beginning of the 20th century, Water Lily Street was still the administrative, financial, commercial, and cultural center of Jinan.

Many famous retail shops and services were located in the street such as the Weisheng dentist, an educational bookstore, a pharmacy, Guang Lisun's grocery.

In 2006, the city government included the renovation of the Water Lily Street among four sites selected for the renovation of the old city in keeping with its historical character, culture, business, and tourism.

== See also ==
- Qushuiting Street
- List of sites in Jinan
