= Nine-Dragon Wall =

Type of screen wall with reliefs of nine different Chinese dragons

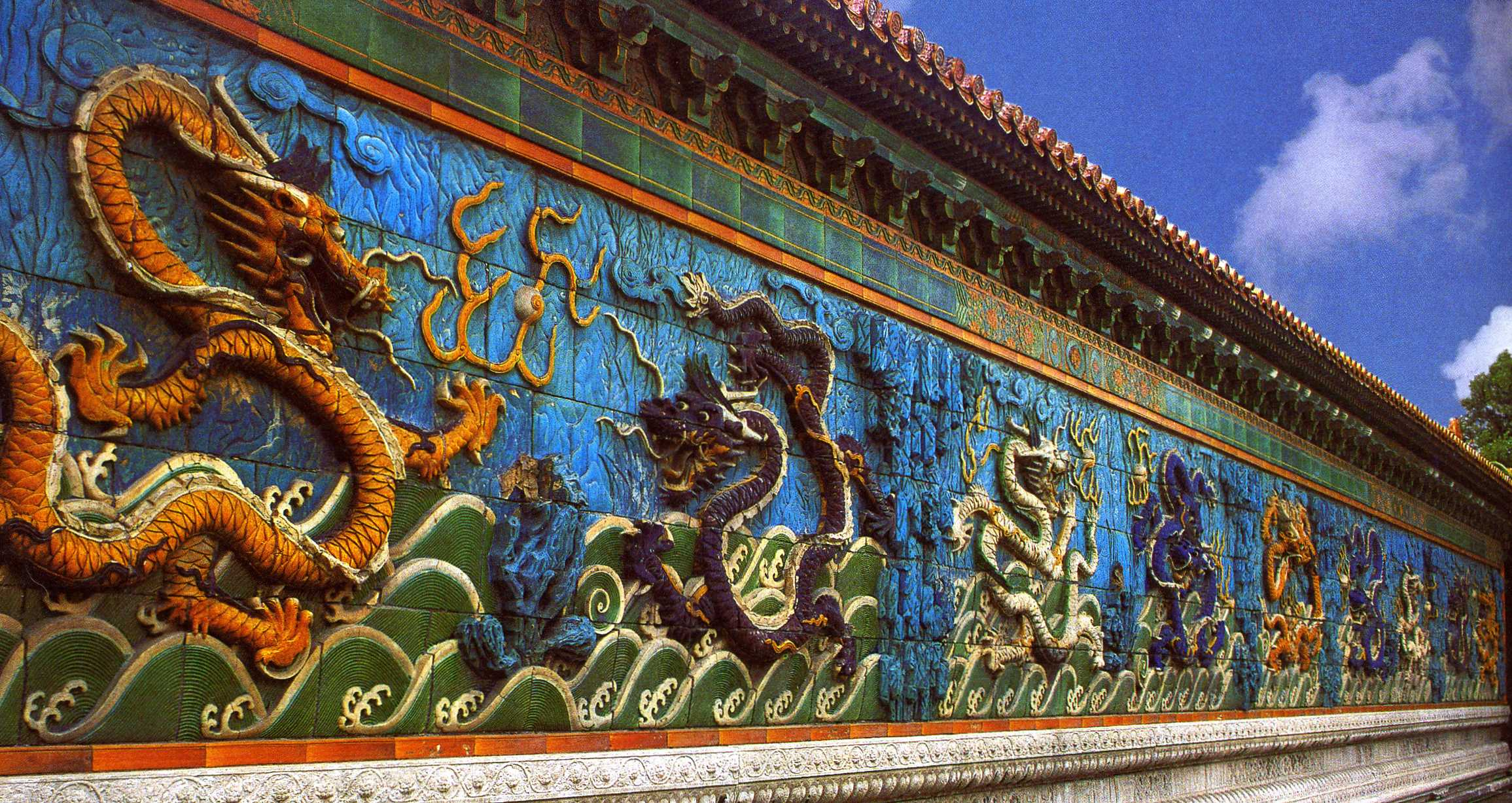
The Nine-Dragon Wall at the Forbidden City

A Nine-Dragon Wall or Nine-Dragon Screen (Chinese: 九龍壁; pinyin: Jiǔ Lóng Bì) is a type of screen wall with reliefs of nine different Chinese dragons. Such walls are typically found in imperial Chinese palaces and gardens.

Early reference to the tradition of putting a screen wall at the gate is found in the Analects, 3:22: therein, it is mentioned as a trivial ritual norm ("The princes of States have a screen intercepting the view at their gates". 邦君樹塞門, trans. by James Legge).

== List of Nine-Dragon Walls ==
Nine-Dragon Walls in China:

- Beihai Park, Beijing. Built in 1756, it features dragons on both sides.
- Forbidden City, Beijing. Built in 1771, it is located in front of the Palace of Tranquil Longevity.
- Datong, opposite the Datong Prince's Palace
- Pingyao
- Hong Kong
  - Public Square Street Rest Garden, Yau Ma Tei. Located at the back of the Tin Hau Temple.
  - Wong Tai Sin Temple
  - China Resources Building, Wan Chai District (removed at the time of the extension of the building)

Outside China (partial):

- Chinese Garden, Edmonton, Canada, stone-carved and largest outside of China. Located at the Chinese Garden at Louise McKinney Park. Initially proposed in 2006 for about $250,000. The back of the wall depicts the Great Wall of China.
- Haw Par Villa, Singapore
- Chinatown, Chicago, Built in 2003, it is a miniature reproduction of the wall in Beihai Park, Beijing.
- Mississauga Chinese Centre, Mississauga, Canada
- Friendship Park, Saint Petersburg

== Gallery ==
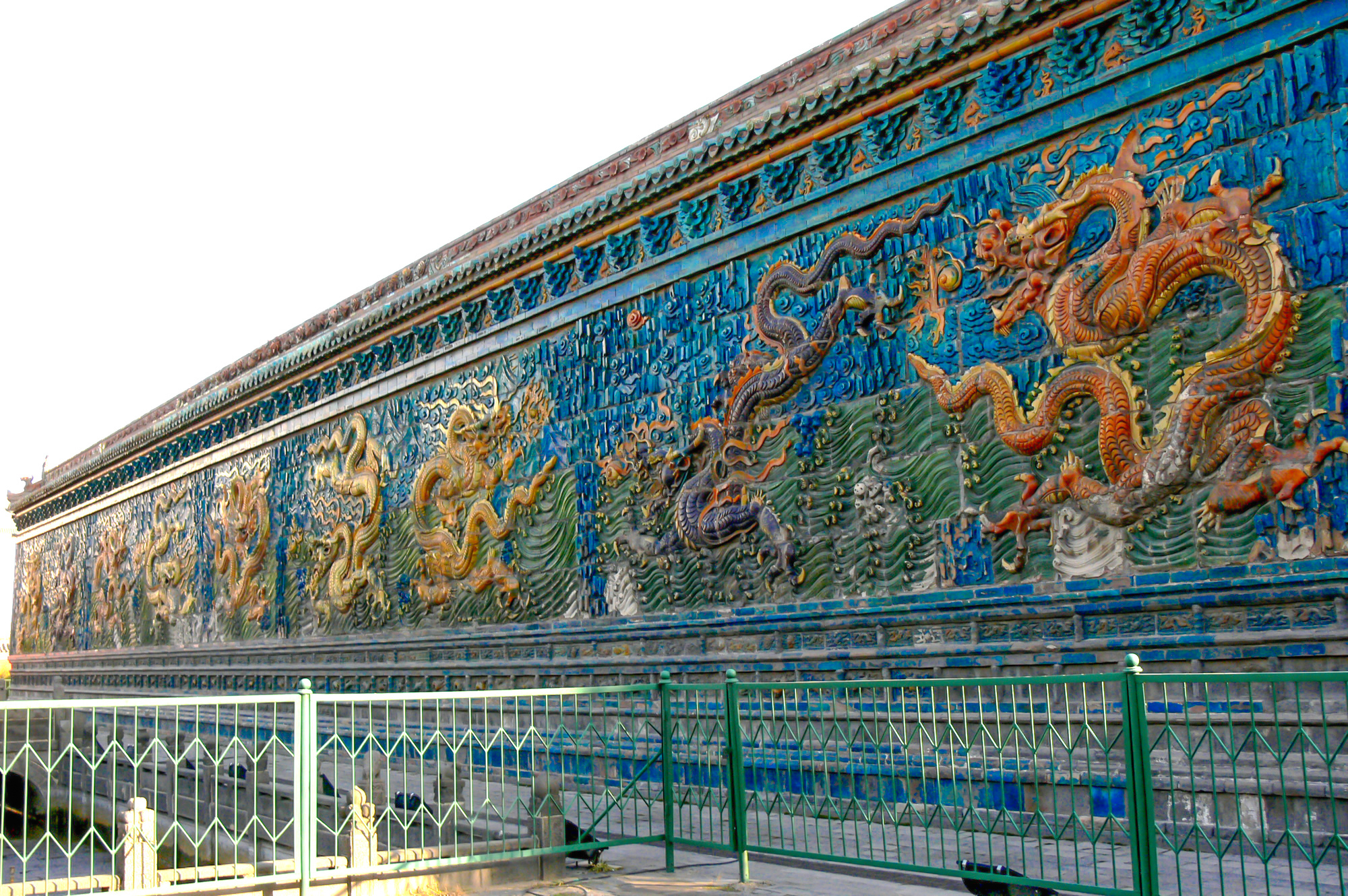
Datong

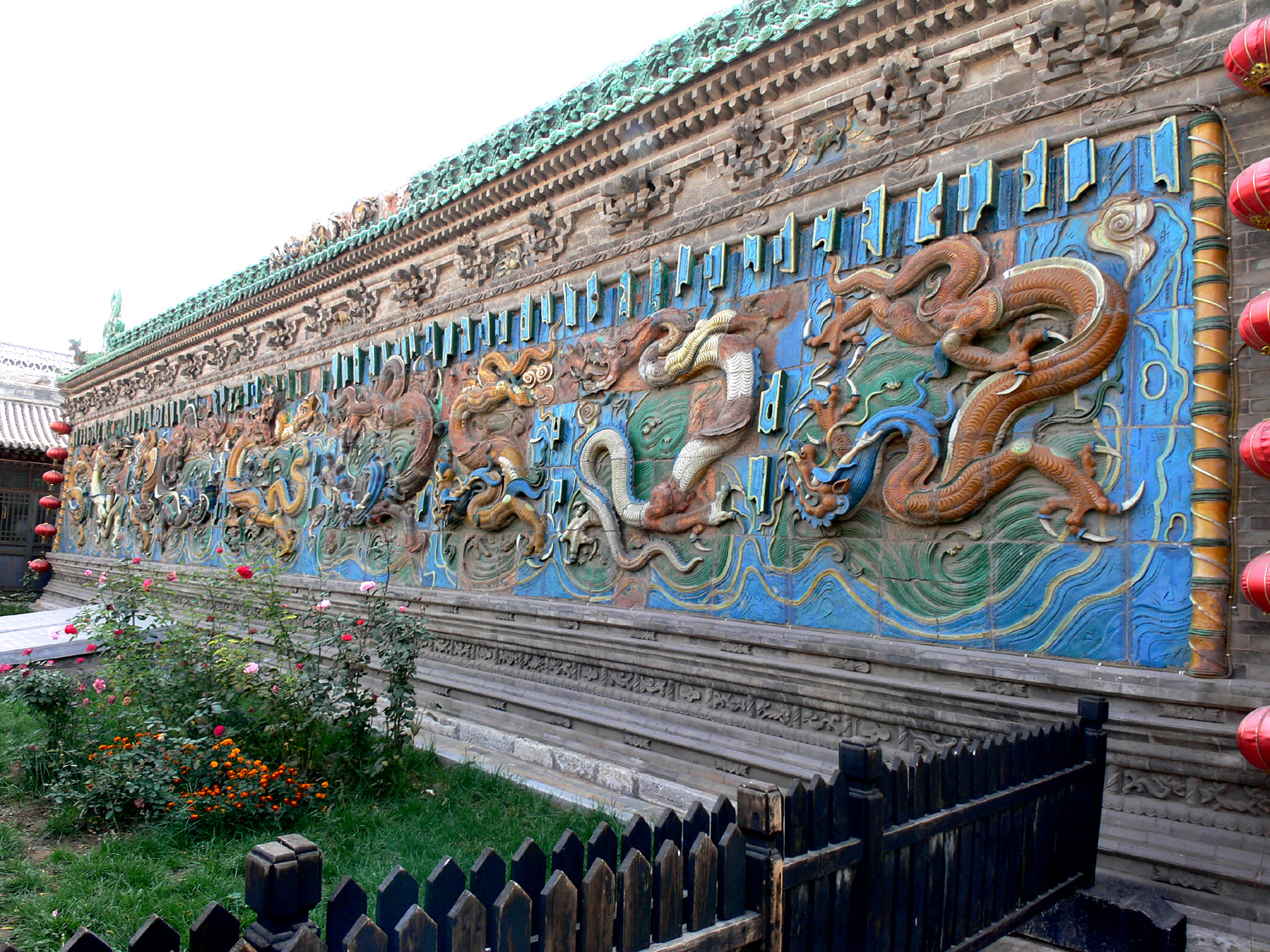
Pingyao

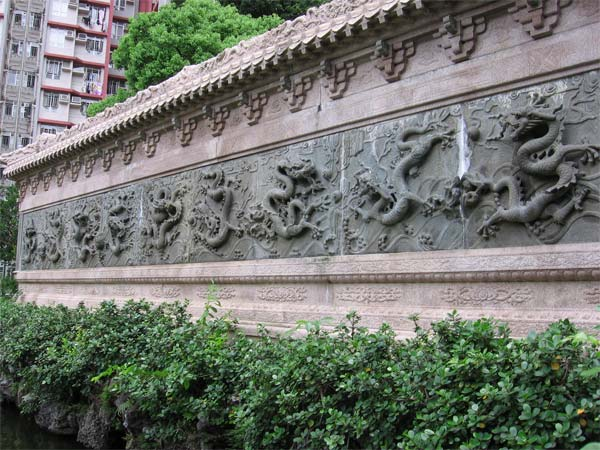
Wong Tai Sin Temple

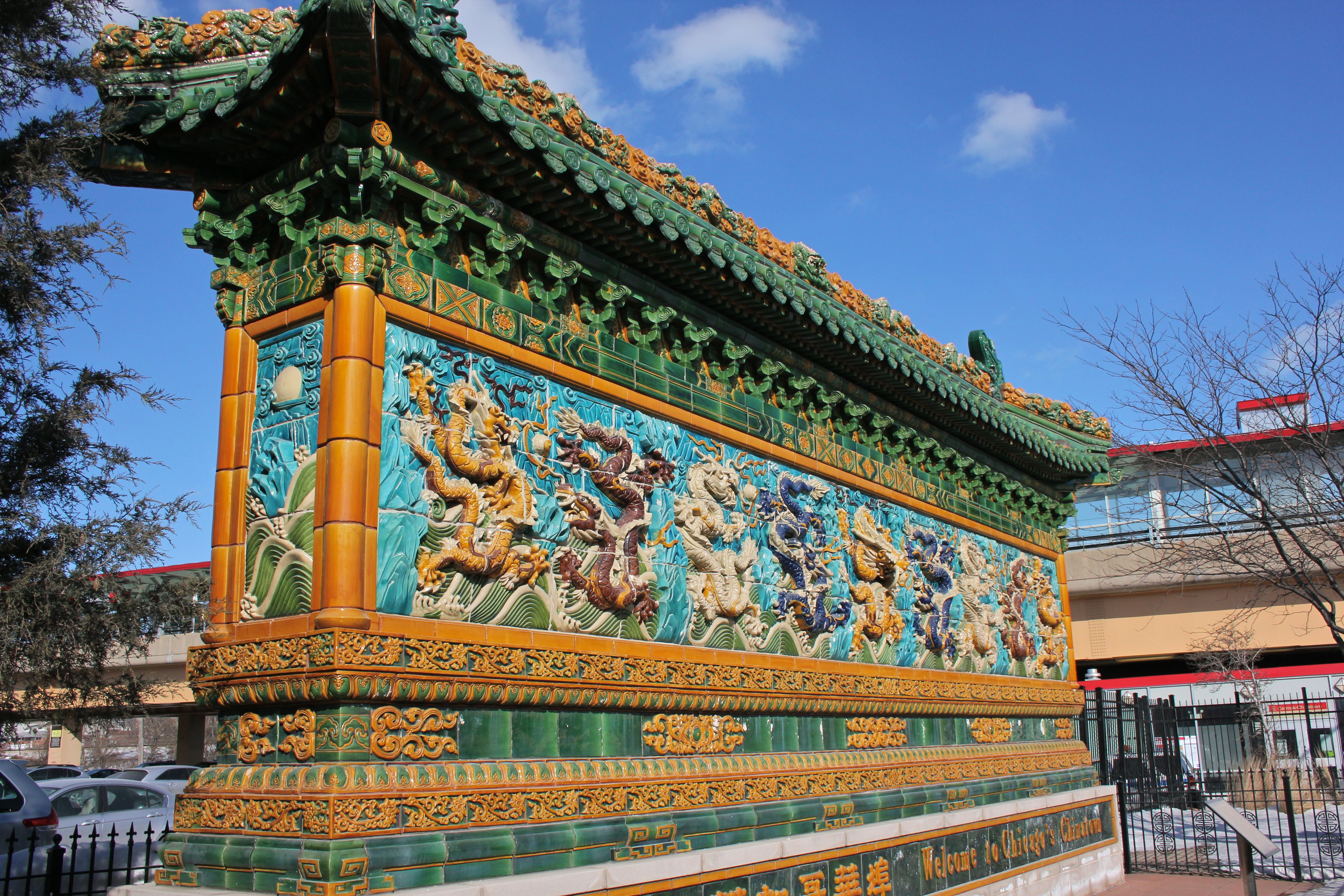
Chinatown, Chicago

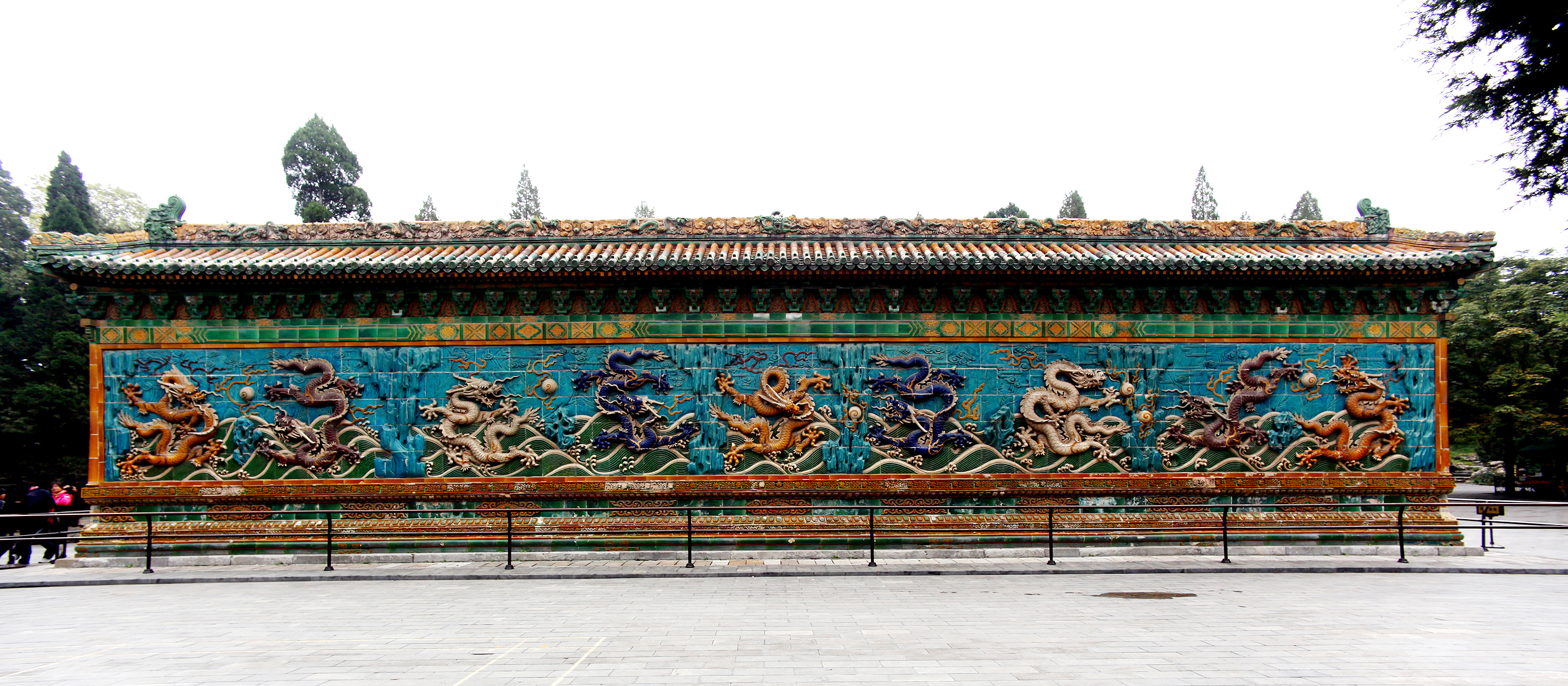
Nine-Dragon Wall in Beihai Park, Beijing

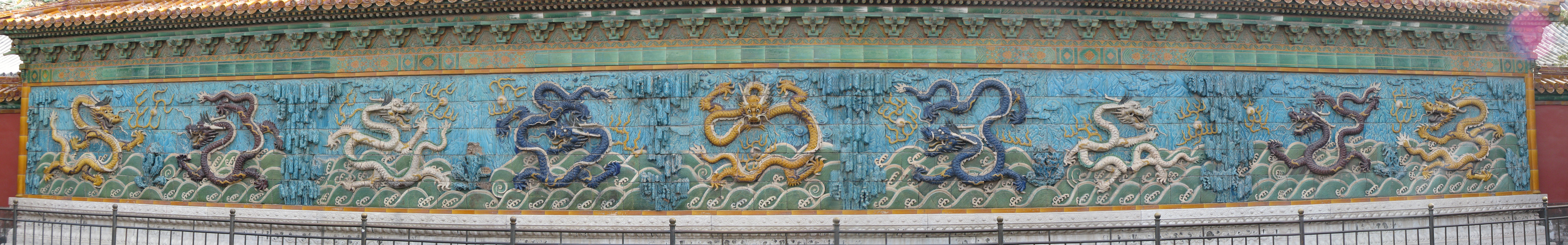
Panorama of Nine-Dragon Wall in the Forbidden City, Beijing

== See also ==
- Legend of the Wall of Nine Dragons
- 9 (number)
- Nine Dragons (disambiguation)
- Spirit screen
- Chinese architecture
- Loong
