= 白話字 =

白話字 (白话字; báihuàzì), meaning "vernacular script" (lit. 'white-speech writing'), also known as Church Romanisation (Chinese: 教會羅馬字; pinyin: jiàohuì luómǎzì) may refer to the following romanisation systems:

- Pe̍h-ōe-jī (Hokkien)
- Pha̍k-fa-sṳ (Hakka)
- Bǽh-oe-tu (Hainanese)
- Pe̍h-ūe-jī (Teochew)

== See also ==
- Bàng-uâ-cê, the similarly-named romanisation system for the Fuzhou dialect
- Baihua (disambiguation)
