= Chinese glazed roof tile =

Type of roofing tile used in China

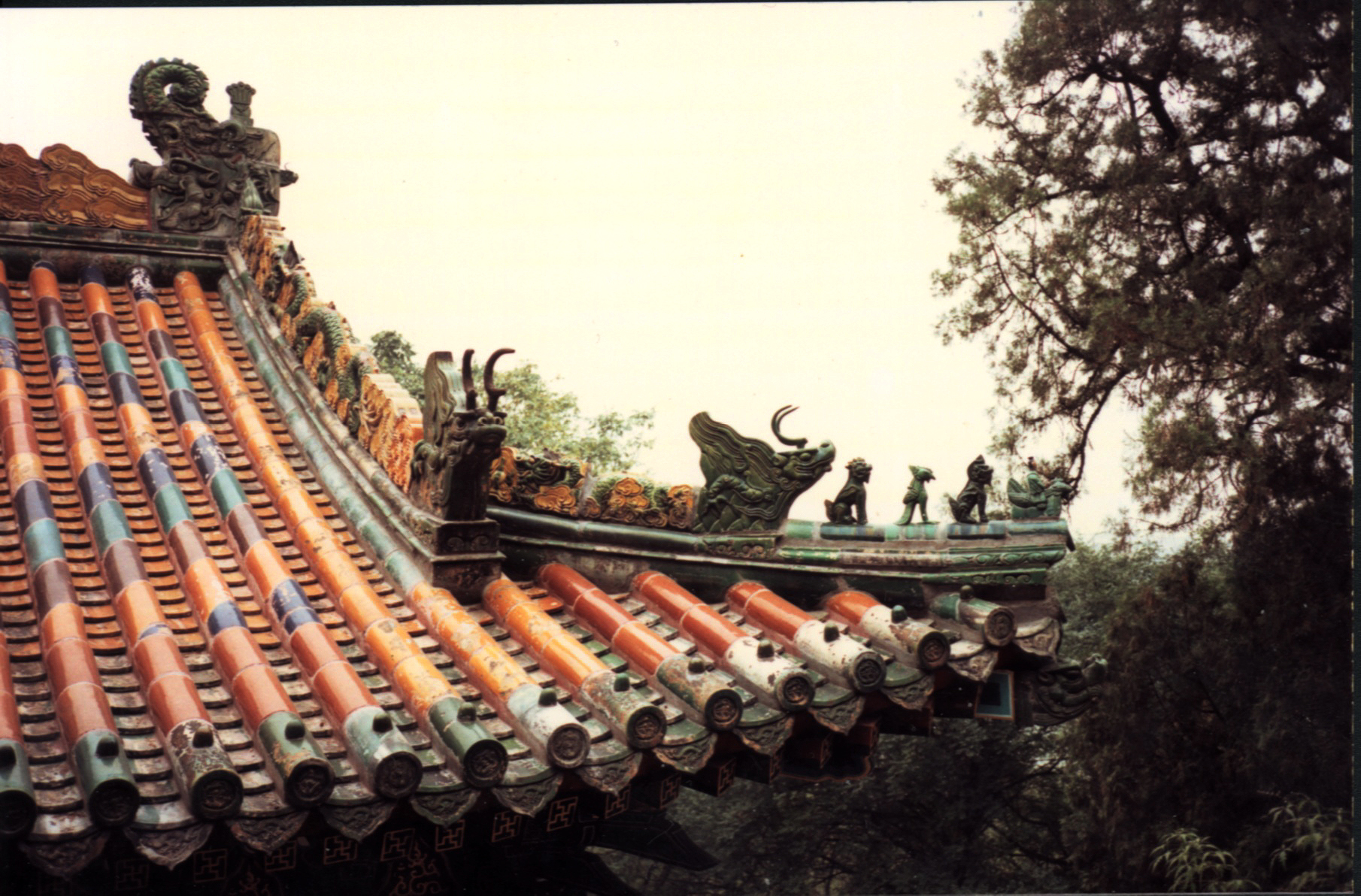
glazed tiles on a roof top

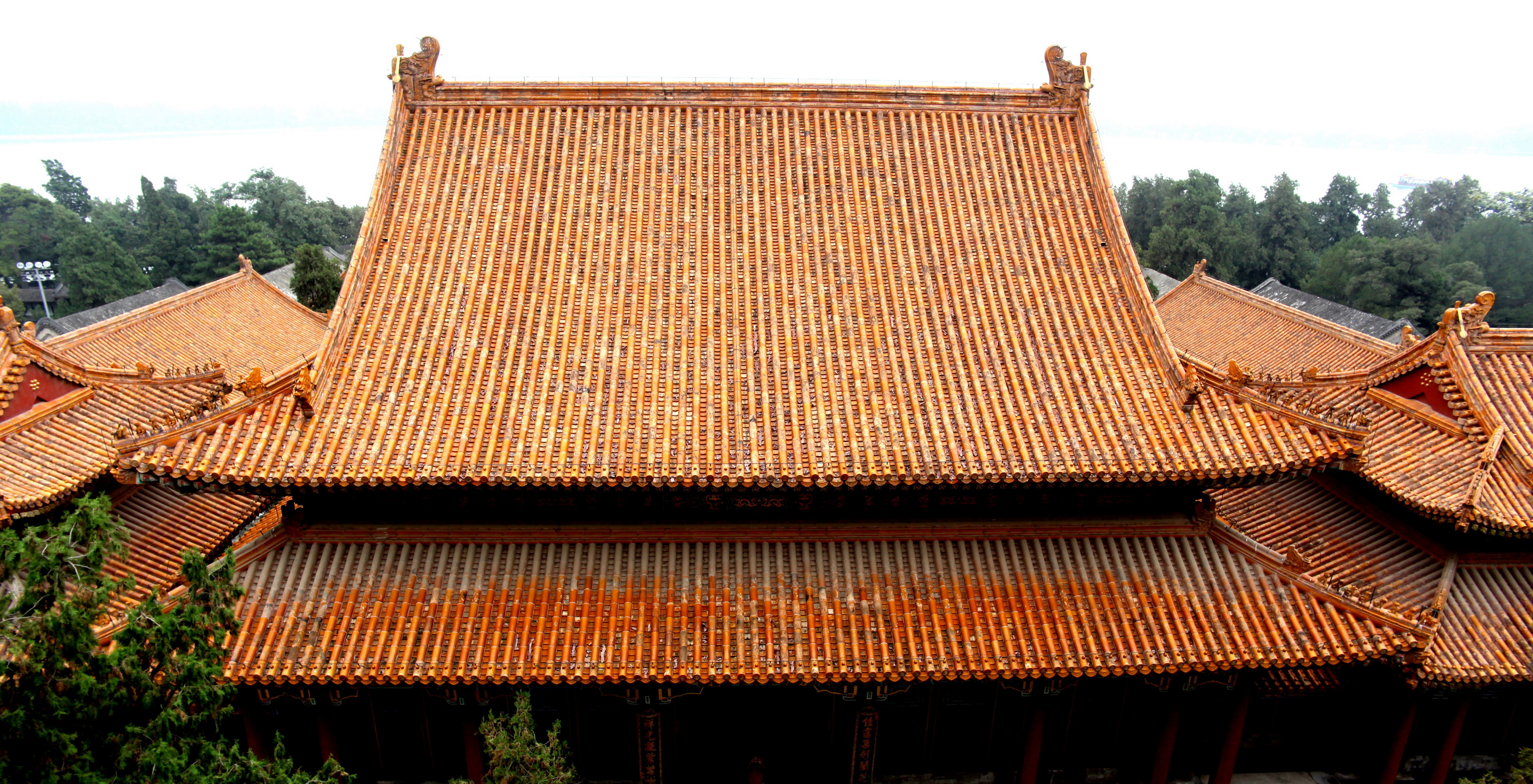
glazed tiles in the Summer Palace

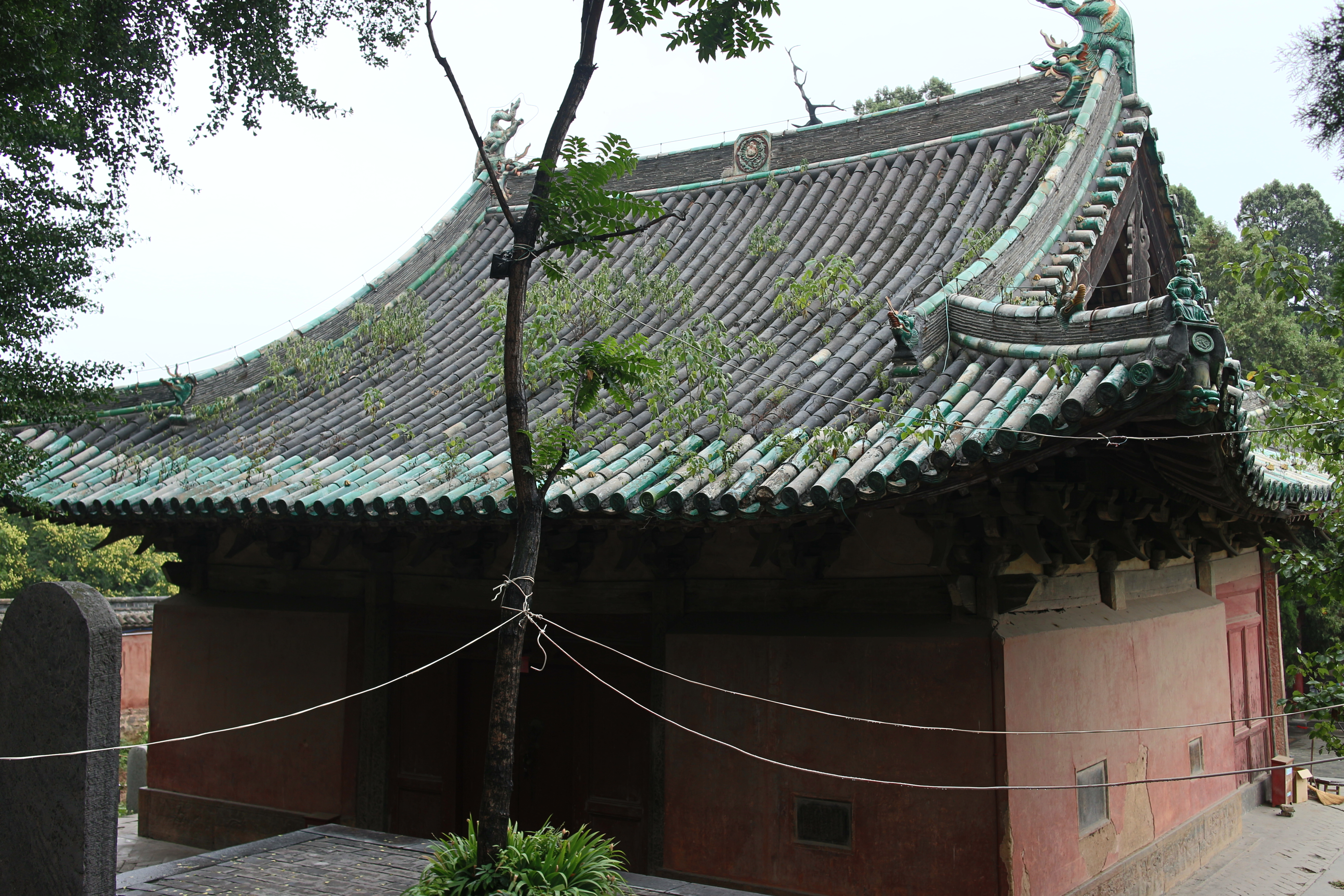
Song dynasty green glazed roof tiles at Chuzu Temple.

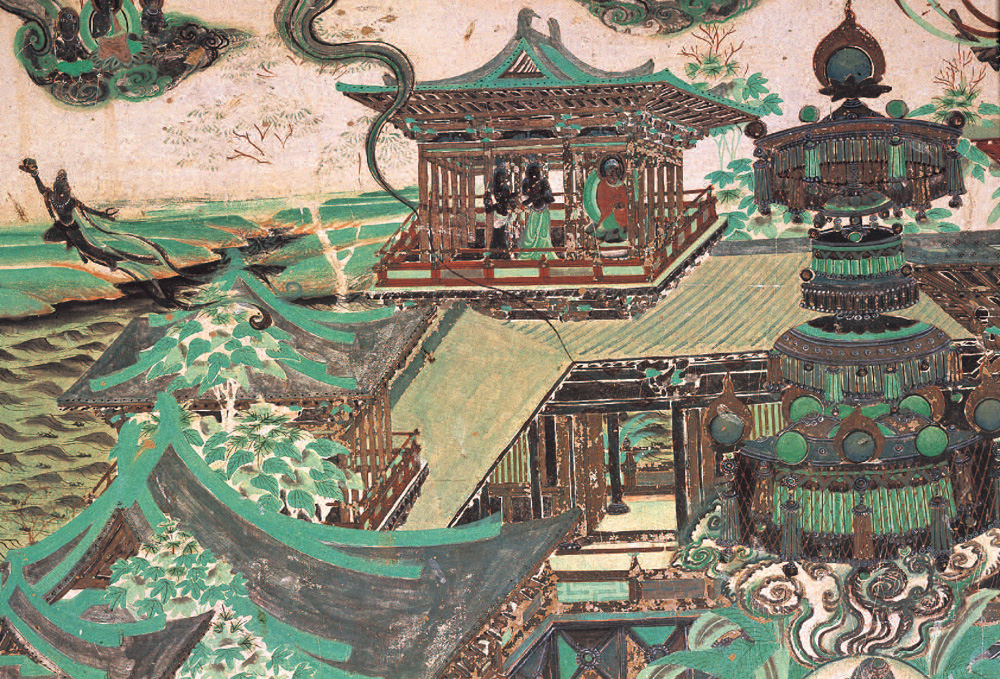
Green glazed tiles of Tang dynasty depicted on mural of Mogao Grottoes.

Glazed tiles (Chinese: 琉璃瓦) have been used in China since the Tang dynasty as a material for roofs.

== History ==
During the Song dynasty, the manufacture of glazed tiles were standardized in Li Jie's Architecture Standard. In the Ming dynasty and Qing dynasty, glazed tiles became ever more popular for top-tier buildings, including palace halls in the Forbidden City, and ceremonial temples (for example the Heavenly Temple).

There are two main types of Chinese glazed tiles: glazed tubular tiles and glazed plate tiles.

== Glazed tubular tiles ==
Tiles are moulded into tube shape on a wooden mould, then cut into halves along their length, producing two tubular tiles, each semicircular in section. A tube-shaped clay mould can be cut into four equal parts, with a cross-section of a quarter of a circle, then glazed into a four-plate tile.

Glazed tubular tiles used at the eave edge have an outer end made into a round shape top, often moulded with the pattern of a dragon. Eave-edge plate tiles have their outer edges decorated with triangles, to facilitate rain-shedding.

== Glazed plate tiles ==
Tiles are laid side by side across and overlapping each other. In the Song dynasty, the standard overlap was forty percent, which increased to seventy percent in the Qing dynasty. With the Song-style forty-percent overlap, it was not possible to have triple tile overlap, as there was a twenty-percent gap between the first plate tile and the third plate tile. Hence, if a crack developed in the second tile, water leakage was inevitable. On the other hand, with the Qing dynasty style seventy-percent overlapping, the first plate tile was overlapped seventy percent, forty percent, and ten percent by the second, third and fourth tiles, respectively; thus even if the second and the third tiles developed cracks, there would be no leakage.
