= 九龍 (disambiguation) =

九龍 ('nine dragons') most often refers to Kowloon, an urban area in Hong Kong.

九龍 may also refer to:

== Other places ==
- Cloudy Hill (Chinese: 九龍坑山), a hill in Hong Kong
- Cửu Long Province (Vietnamese: Tỉnh Cửu Long / 省九龍), a former province in southern Vietnam
- Guryong Station (Korean: 九龍驛), in South Korea
- Kuroshima and Taijima (Japanese: 九龍島と鯛島), islands in Japan

== People ==
- Kūron Oshiro (尾城九龍), a Japanese music composer and arranger

== See also ==
- Jiulong (disambiguation), for articles on places using the pinyin variant of this name
- Kowloon (disambiguation), for articles referring to areas related to Kowloon
- Cửu Long (disambiguation), Vietnamese quốc ngữ equivalent
