= Operation Cuu Long 44-02 =

Part of the Vietnam War (1971)

- Part of the Vietnam War
Date	13–25 January 1971
Location	Route 4, Cambodia
Result	South Vietnamese/FANK victory

Belligerents
South Vietnam; Khmer Republic; United States	North Vietnam; Khmer Rouge

Commanders and leaders
General Ngô Quang Trưởng	

Units involved
(South Vietnam) 4th Armor Brigade; 4th Ranger Group; 2nd Marine Brigade	(North Vietnam) 1st Division

Casualties and losses
(South Vietnam) 16 killed	South Vietnamese body count: 211 killed

Operation Cuu Long 44-02 was an operation during the Vietnam War conducted by South Vietnamese and Cambodian forces from 13-25 January 1971 to reopen Route 4 in Cambodia.

== Background ==
The operation was conducted in order to assist the Cambodian Khmer National Armed Forces (FANK) in reopening and re-establishing security along Route 4. In September 1970, Khmer Rouge forces together with units of the People’s Army of Vietnam (PAVN) 1st Division, had closed this line of communications by occupying the Pich Nil Pass (11.195°N 104.074°E). Several FANK outposts on Route 4 had been overrun in the process and other posts had been evacuated without resistance. Although the Mekong River supply route was open, Route 4 was very important to the FANK and to the Cambodian Government for all types of supplies, but particularly for military equipment. When the FANK requested help on Route 4, the South Vietnamese Joint General Staff (JGS) assigned the mission to the Commander of IV Corps General Ngô Quang Trưởng.

Forces for the operation consisted of the Army of the Republic of Vietnam 4th Armor Brigade and 4th Ranger Group from IV Corps. In addition, the JGS reinforced the operation with the 2nd Marine Brigade. These forces were organized for combat into two task forces. Task Force North consisted of the 2nd Marine Brigade and the 12th Armor Regiment. It moved by vehicle, along Route 1 to Phnom Penh and by Route 4 to Kompong Speu. Task Force South consisted of the 4th Armor Brigade and the 4th Ranger Group. It departed Hà Tiên on Route 16 along the coast and was to continue west to Route 4, then north then northeast to link up with Task Force North as it moved southwest. Air support was the responsibility of the Republic of Vietnam Air Force 4th Air Division at Binh Thuy Air Base, whose assets were supplemented by US air units, reconnaissance, tactical strike aircraft and B-52s. In addition, US fire support and medical evacuation helicopters were positioned at An Thoi Naval Base on Phú Quốc island, from where they were in a better position to support the forces operating in the south.

== Operation ==
The operation began on 13 January 1971 as the 4th Armor Brigade with the 12th and 16th Armored Cavalry Regiments, three Ranger battalions, an artillery battalion, and an engineer group moved 300 kilometers from Cần Thơ to Hà Tiên in 14 hours. For the next two days the brigade pushed north along Route 4. The first enemy encountered had set up an ambush that the 16th Armored Cavalry Regiment blew away by charging on line.

A second ambush further north against the 12th Armored Cavalry also failed. The enemy tried to isolate the lead squadron by destroying the first and last vehicles. The lead commander however, kept his flaming vehicle moving and his machine gun firing. Hit three times and burning, the ACAV continued north for about 150 meters before it blew up killing the crew. This prevented the column from being trapped on the road allowed the cavalry to get out of the enemy firing lines. The Ranger battalion behind the cavalry squadron stopped and opened fire. The ambushers were now in a deadly cross-fire between the cavalry and the Rangers. Two US aerial fire teams sealed off the enemy escape routes. When the smoke cleared 200 of the enemy lay dead and 75 weapons, including 2 75mm recoilless rifles and three heavy machine guns. had been captured. The 12th Armored Cavalry Regiment lost five killed, twenty wounded and three ACAVs destroyed.

On 17 January FANK forces with Vietnamese Marine Corps support, fought to the outskirts of the Pich Nil Pass and secured it while the armor brigade secured Route 4 as far north as Route 18. After helping the Cambodians set up strongpoints the 4th Armor Brigade withdrew towards South Vietnam, arriving by 25 January.

== Aftermath ==
The operation ended on 25 January. PAVN/Khmer Rouge losses were 211 killed while ARVN losses were 16 killed.
