= Hundred Flower Pond =

Lake in Jinan, Shandong, China

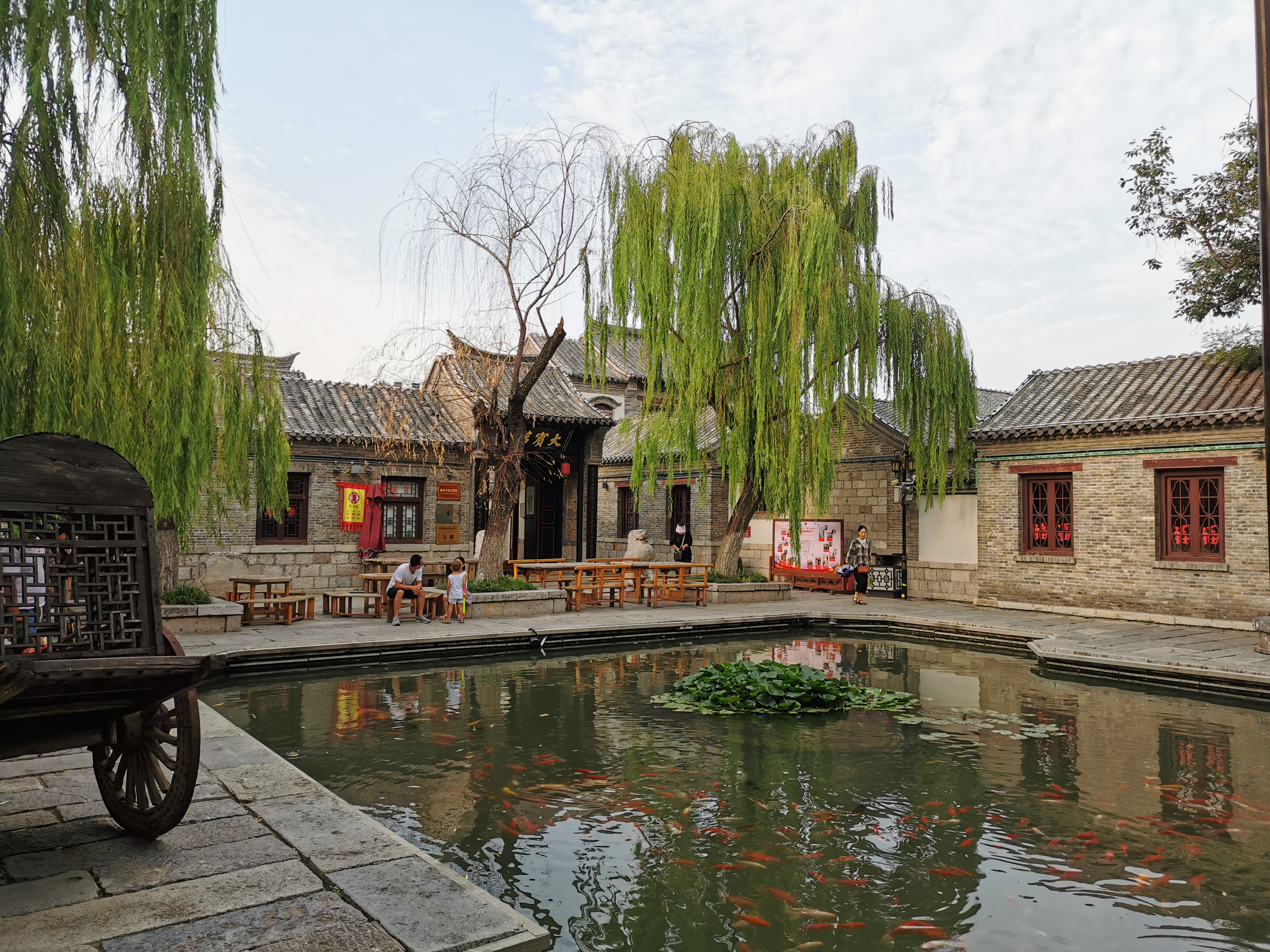
- A corner of the Hundred Flower Pond

- Location within Shandong
- Location: Jinan, Shandong
- Coordinates: 36°40′15.20″N 117°1′6.67″E
- Primary outflows: Daming Lake
- Basin countries: China
- Islands: none
- Settlements: Jinan

The Hundred Flower Pond (Chinese: 百花洲; pinyin: Bǎihuā Zhōu also Chinese: 百花汀; pinyin: Bǎihuā Tīng or Chinese: 百花池; pinyin: Bǎihuā Chí) is a small artificial lake in the historical center of the City of Jinan, Shandong Province, China. It is located east of the northern end of Qushuiting Street and south of Daming Lake Road.

== See also ==
- List of sites in Jinan
