= Jiulong =

Jiulong, the atonal pinyin romanization of various Chinese words and names, may refer to:

== Places ==
- Jiulong County (九龙县) of Garzê Tibetan Autonomous Prefecture, Sichuan
- Jiulong River (九龙江) in Fujian

=== Towns ===
- Jiulong, Fuyang, in Yingzhou District, Fuyang, Anhui
- Jiulong, Chongqing, in Jiulongpo District, Chongqing
- Jiulong, Guangzhou, in Luogang District, Guangzhou, Guangdong
- Jiulong, Yingde, in Yingde City, Guangdong
- Jiulong, Laishui County, in Laishui County, Hebei
- Jiulong, Zhongmu County, in Zhongmu County, Henan
- Jiulong, Taizhou, Jiangsu, in Hailing District, Taizhou, Jiangsu
- Jiulong, Yugan County, in Yugan County, Jiangxi
- Jiulong, Jiaozhou, in Jiaozhou City, Shandong
- Jiulong, Jintang County, in Jintang County, Sichuan
- Jiulong, Linshui County, in Linshui County, Sichuan
- Jiulong, Mianzhu, in Mianzhu City, Sichuan
- Jiulong, Yuechi County, in Yuechi County, Sichuan
- Jiulong, Luoping County, in Luoping County, Yunnan

=== Townships ===
- Jiulong, Dengzhou, in Dengzhou City, Henan
- Jiulong, Anyue County, in Anyue County, Sichuan
- Jiulong, Leshan, in Shizhong District, Leshan, Sichuan
- Jiulong, Wangcang County, in Wangcang County, Sichuan
- Jiulong, Yilong County, in Yilong County, Sichuan
- Jiulong, Luquan County, in Luquan Yi and Miao Autonomous County, Sichuan
- Jiulong, Jingning She Autonomous County, in Jingning She Autonomous County, Zhejiang

=== Waterfalls ===
- Jiulong Waterfall (Anhui) in Huangshan, Anhui
- Jiulong Waterfall (Yunnan) in Luoping County, Yunnan

== Other uses ==
- Nine Dragons Paper Holdings Limited (玖龙纸业控股), a paper manufacturer in mainland China

== See also ==
- Kowloon (disambiguation) for Cantonese places known as Jiulong in Mandarin Chinese
- 九龍 (disambiguation) ('nine dragons')
- Cửu Long (disambiguation), Vietnamese quốc ngữ equivalent
