= Kowloon (disambiguation) =

Kowloon is an urban area that is part of Hong Kong.

Kowloon may also refer to:

== Places ==
=== Kowloon, Hong Kong ===
- Kowloon Peninsula, a peninsula that forms the southern part of the main landmass in the territory of Hong Kong
- New Kowloon, an area in Kowloon
  - Kowloon City, an area in New Kowloon
- Kowloon Bay (body of water), to the east of Kowloon
  - Kowloon Bay (area)
- Kowloon Central Post Office
- Kowloon City District, one of the 18 districts of Hong Kong which encompasses Kowloon City, Kowloon Tong and other areas
  - Kowloon Tong, an area in Kowloon City District
- Kowloon Hospital, a general care hospital at Argyle Street in Mong Kok
- Kowloon Park, a public park in Tsim Sha Tsui
- Kowloon Point, the west cape of Tsim Sha Tsui
  - Kowloon Point Ferry Pier, the official naming of Star Ferry Pier, Tsim Sha Tsui
- Kowloon Rock, an island in Kowloon Bay
- Kowloon Shangri-La, one of two Shangri-La hotels in Hong Kong
- Kowloon Tsai, between Kowloon City and Kowloon Tong
  - Kowloon Tsai Park, a park located in the Kowloon Tsai area of Kowloon
- Kowloon Walled City, a former unique residential block

=== Other places in Hong Kong ===
- Kowloon Peak, a mountain in the northeast corner of New Kowloon, in Ma On Shan Country Park
- Cloudy Hill, also called Kowloon Hang Shan or Kau Lung Hang Shan, located in the Kau Lung Hang area
- Kau Lung Hang, a village in Tai Po District, Hong Kong

== Arts and entertainment ==
- Kowloon Tong (novel), a novel by Paul Theroux
- Kowloon Palace, a fictional location in the anime Street Fighter II V
- Kowloon, a fictional location in the video game Digimon Story: Cyber Sleuth
- Kowloon, a type of vampire from the manga and anime series Black Blood Brothers
- The Siege of Kowloon Walled City, a 2024 action film directed by Soi Cheang

== Companies ==
- Kowloon Dairy, one of the major dairy producers in Hong Kong
- Kowloon Motor Bus (or KMB), the largest franchised bus operators in Hong Kong
- Kowloon–Canton Railway (or KCR), a railway network in Hong Kong
- Kowloon-Canton Railway Corporation (or KCRC), an assets holding company based in Hong Kong

== Transport ==
=== Railway lines ===
- Kowloon Southern Link, a section of the MTR West Rail line, linking Nam Cheong station and East Tsim Sha Tsui station
- East Kowloon line, one of the original five MTR lines proposed in the late 1970s in Hong Kong

=== Railway stations ===
- Kowloon station (MTR), a station on the Tung Chung line and the Airport Express of Hong Kong's MTR
- Kowloon railway station (KCR), the former southern terminus of the Kowloon-Canton Railway. Not to be confused with Hung Hom station
- Kowloon Bay station, a station on the Hong Kong MTR Kwun Tong line
- Kowloon Tong station
- Hong Kong West Kowloon railway station, a railway station on the West Rail line railway line in Hong Kong
- Hung Hom station, formerly known as Kowloon station, on the East Rail line and West Rail line

=== Highways ===
- East Kowloon Corridor, part of the Route 5 highway
- West Kowloon Corridor, part of the Route 5 highway
- West Kowloon Highway, a section of the Route 3 highway

== Other uses ==
- Kowloon Bridge, a Bridge-class Ore-bulk-oil carrier that sank off the coast of West Cork, Ireland in 1986
- Kowloon Restaurant, in Saugus, Massachusetts, described as America's largest Asian dining complex
- Kowloon Technical School, a technical secondary school in Sham Shui Po, Kowloon, Hong Kong

== See also ==
- West Kowloon
- 九龍 (disambiguation)
- Jiulong (disambiguation)
