= Spirit screen =

yingbi
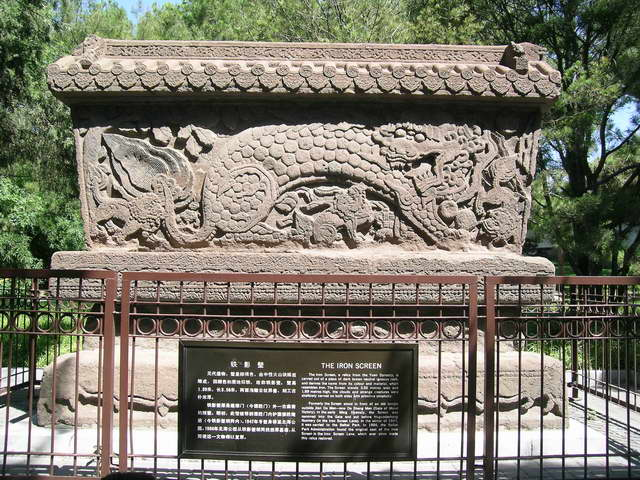
- An iron screen wall ("spirit screen") from the Yuan Era in Beihai Park, Beijing
- Chinese: 影壁
- Literal meaning: shadow wall
Transcriptions
Standard Mandarin
- Hanyu Pinyin: yǐngbì
- Wade–Giles: ying-pi

zhaobi
- Chinese: 照壁
Transcriptions
Standard Mandarin
- Hanyu Pinyin: zhàobì
- Wade–Giles: chao-pi

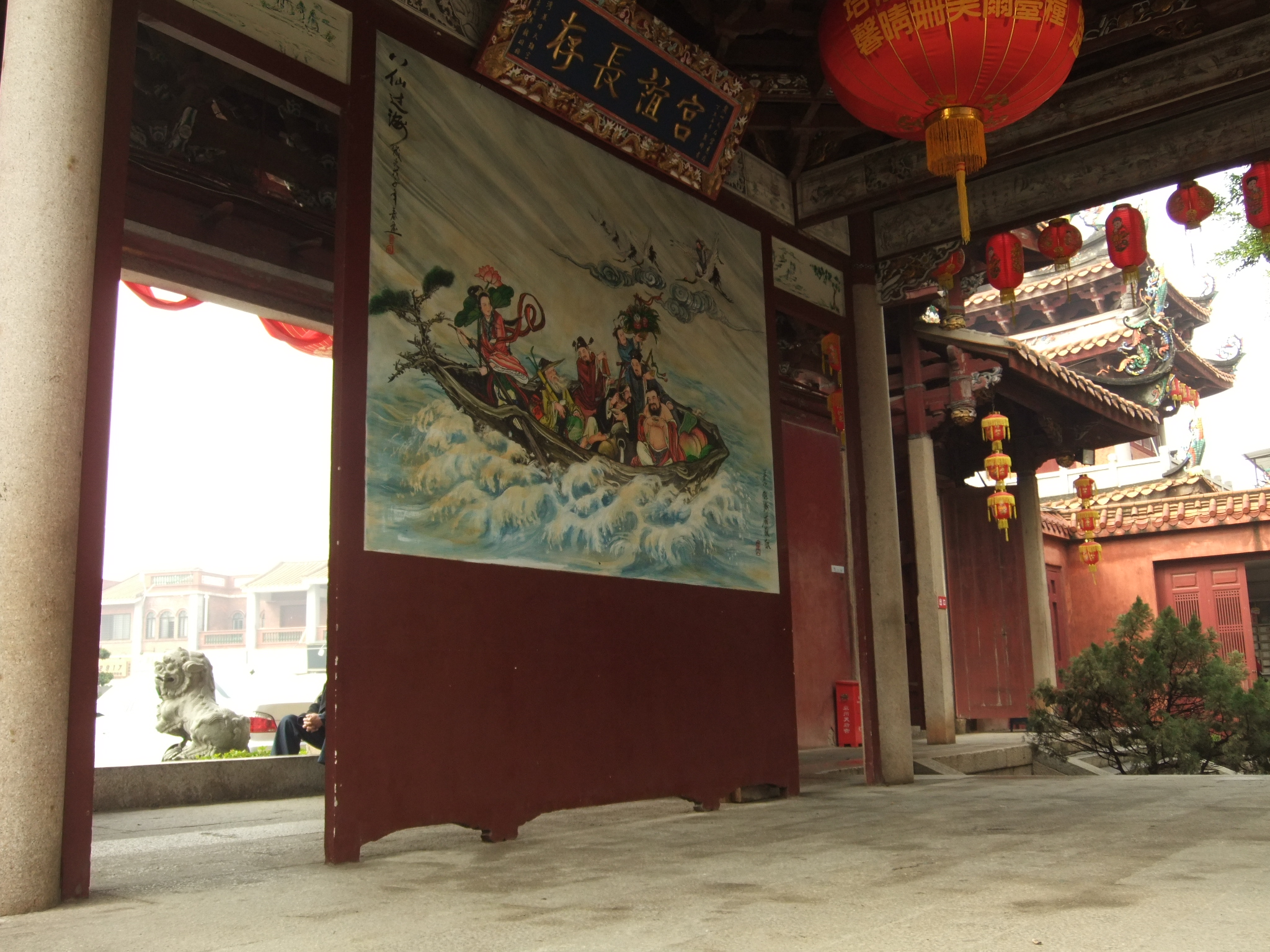
A simple spirit screen in Tian Hou Gong (temple of Mazu) in Quanzhou

A spirit screen, also called a spirit wall, screen wall, yingbi, or zhaobi, is used to shield an entrance gate in traditional Chinese architecture. Spirit screens can be positioned either on the outside or the inside of the gate they are protecting. The Chinese term "yingbi" is used to refer to screens on the outside as well as on the inside, whereas the term "zhaobi" is used only to refer to screens positioned on the outside. Spirit screens can be either solitary structures or could be attached to a neighboring wall. They can be constructed from a variety of materials such as brick, wood, stone, or glazed tile. Outer spirit screens were often status symbols and could be richly decorated. Common decorations include symbols of good luck, such as the character for good fortune (Chinese: 福; pinyin: fú). Particularly ornate spirit screens featuring a dragon motif are the Nine-Dragon Walls that can be found in imperial palaces and gardens.

Spirit screens are tied to the belief that evil spirits (Chinese: 鬼; pinyin: guǐ) cannot move around corners, hence the spirit screen blocks them from entering through the gate they shield.

Practically, they allow natural light and air circulation to enter a room, while obstructing vision. A solution that allows for privacy and cooling in an era without air conditioning.

Archaeological evidence has established the existence of spirit screens back to the Western Zhou dynasty (1046–771 BCE). During the times of the Western Zhou, spirit screens were a privilege reserved for palaces and the mansions of noblemen such as dukes or princes. The usage of spirit screens in private residences did not develop until much later.

== See also ==
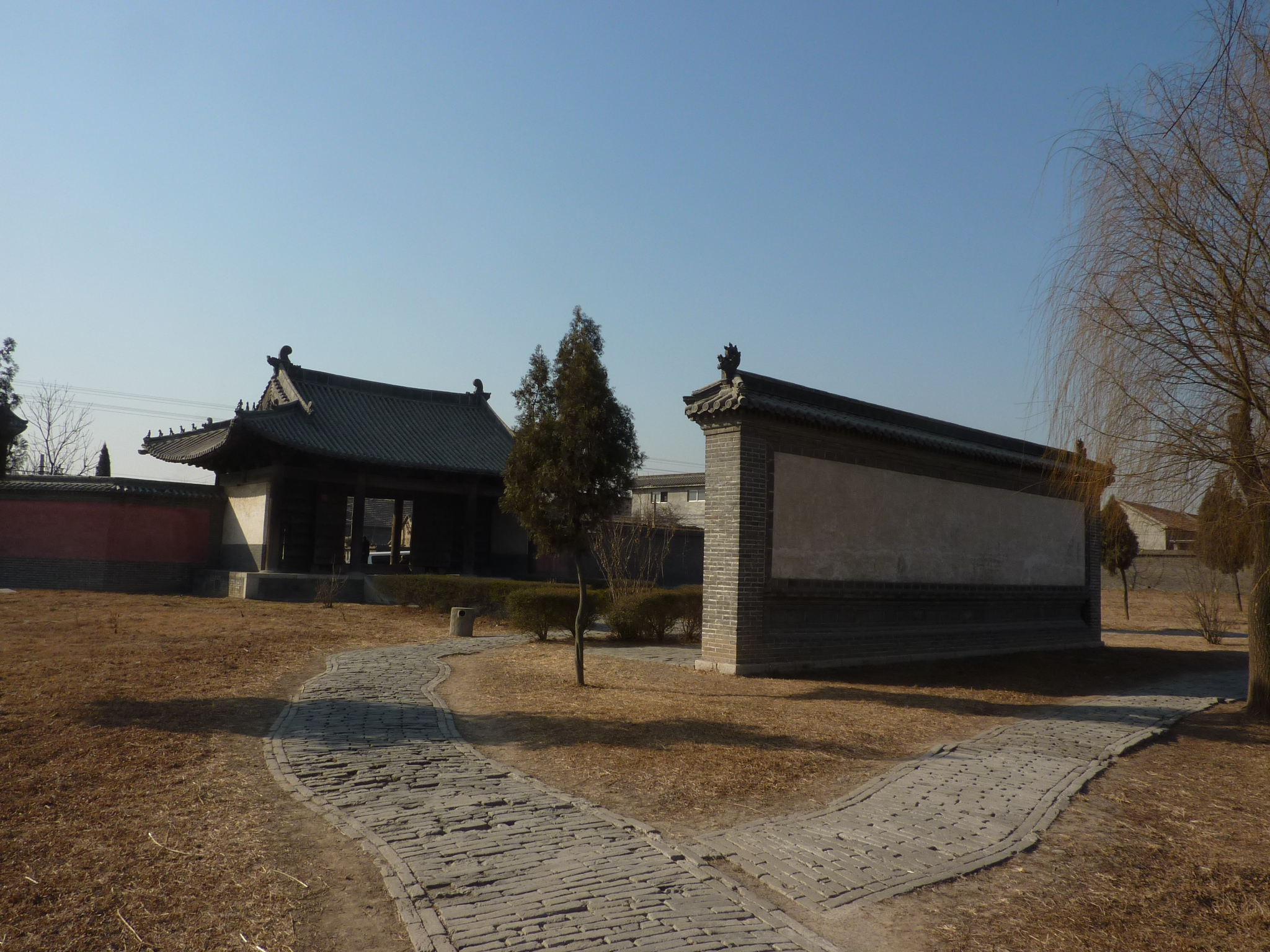
A modern "spirit screen" inside the gates of the Shou Qiu historical site in Qufu

- Nine-Dragon Wall
- Siheyuan - a traditional residential compound, whose layout normally includes a "spirit screen".
