= List of karst springs =

This is a list of karst springs. There are different types of karst springs, including inversacs (or estavelles), Vauclusian springs, vruljas, and others. All of them form in limestone settings.

Image	Name	Average discharge	Place	State (Province)	River system	Basin (km²)	Location
	Kladuk	150,000-180,000 L/s	Sayosa Distrik Kampong Saluk	Indonesia (West Papua)	Aouk-Kladuk-Kabra	ca. 2800	1.102088°S 131.789529°E
	Aachtopf	8,590 L/s; 303 cu ft/s	Aach	Germany (Baden-Württemberg)	Rhine	240	47.846708°N 8.857863°E
	Ain ez Zarqa	13,000 L/s; 460 cu ft/s	Hermel	Lebanon (Beqaa Governorate)	Orentes		34.352222°N 36.373056°E
	Big Spring	286 million US gal/d 12,500 L/s	Ozarks, Missouri	US (Missouri)	Mississippi		
	Vrelo Trebišnjice	125 m^{3}/s 4,400 cu ft/s to 220 m^{3}/s 7,800 cu ft/s	Bileća	Bosnia and Herzegovina	Trebišnjica-Neretva		42.8644525°N 18.4212613°E
	Vrelo Bune	43,000 L/s; 1,500 cu ft/s	Mostar	Bosnia and Herzegovina	Neretva		43.256901°N 17.903445°E
	Bunica wellsprings	0 L/s; 0 cu ft/s	Mostar	Bosnia and Herzegovina	Neretva		43.2213617°N 17.8901196°E
	Sana wellsprings group	0 L/s; 0 cu ft/s	Ribnik	Bosnia and Herzegovina	Danube		44.3173773°N 16.8365586°E
	Ribnik wellsprings group	0 L/s; 0 cu ft/s	Ribnik	Bosnia and Herzegovina	Danube		44.4032695°N 16.7998445°E
	Sanica wellsprings	0 L/s; 0 cu ft/s	Sanica	Bosnia and Herzegovina	Danube		44.606495°N 16.618516°E
	Dabar wellsprings	0 L/s; 0 cu ft/s	Sanski Most	Bosnia and Herzegovina	Danube		44.7093608°N 16.6394055°E
	Krušnica wellsprings	0 L/s; 0 cu ft/s	Bosanska Krupa	Bosnia and Herzegovina	Danube		44.84472°N 16.1682996°E
	Bastašica wellsprings	0 L/s; 0 cu ft/s	Drvar	Bosnia and Herzegovina	Danube		44.3919433°N 16.3268101°E
	Bioštica wellsprings	0 L/s; 0 cu ft/s	Sokolac	Bosnia and Herzegovina	Danube		43.990715°N 18.7796205°E
	Mokranjska Miljacka wellsprings	0 L/s; 0 cu ft/s	Pale	Bosnia and Herzegovina	Danube		43.990715°N 18.7796205°E
	Vrelo Bosne		Ilidža	Bosnia and Herzegovina	Danube		43.818867°N 18.269447°E
	Krupa wellsprings	0 L/s; 0 cu ft/s	Krupa na Vrbasu	Bosnia and Herzegovina	Danube		44.6185773°N 17.1058846°E
	Bistrica wellsprings	0 L/s; 0 cu ft/s	Livno	Bosnia and Herzegovina	Cetina		43.8326132°N 17.0087698°E
	Trebižat wellsprings	0 L/s; 0 cu ft/s	Grude	Bosnia and Herzegovina	Neretva		43.336715°N 17.323457°E
	Blautopf	2,300 L/s; 81 cu ft/s	Blaubeuren	Germany (Baden-Württemberg)	Danube	ca. 150	48.416228°N 9.78433°E
	Brenztopf	1,270 L/s; 45 cu ft/s	Königsbronn	Germany (Baden-Württemberg)	Danube		48.73747°N 10.112979°E
	Brunnenmühlenquelle	1,500 L/s; 53 cu ft/s	Heidenheim	Germany (Baden-Württemberg)	Danube	> 100	48.665178°N 10.149972°E
	Buchbrunnenquelle	927 L/s; 32.7 cu ft/s	Dischingen	Germany (Baden-Württemberg)	Danube		48.680375°N 10.364088°E
	Creux-Genat		Courtedoux	Switzerland (Kanton Jura)	Rhone		47.396372°N 7.0273°E
	Dan-Quelle	6,000 L/s; 210 cu ft/s	Dan	Israel (Galiläa)	Jordan		33.248639°N 35.652472°E
	Foce del Timavo		San Giovanni al Timavo	Italy (Gorizia)	Timavo		45.786694°N 13.591557°E
	Fosse Dionne	311 L/s; 11.0 cu ft/s	Tonnerre	France (Yonne)	Armançon/Yonne/Seine		47°51′24″N 3°58′14″E
	Gailachquelle	650 L/s; 23 cu ft/s	Mühlheim	Germany (Bayern)	Danube		48.860278°N 10.988889°E
	Gleßbrunnen	700 L/s; 25 cu ft/s	Wolkertshofen	Germany (Bayern)	Danube		48.793903°N 11.254742°E
	Hederquellen	1,900 L/s; 67 cu ft/s	Upsprunge	Germany (Nordrhein-Westfalen)	Rhine		51.653731°N 8.600808°E
	Izvor Omble	24,000 L/s; 850 cu ft/s	Dubrovnik	Croatia (Dubrovnik-Neretva)	Ombla		42.67575°N 18.136083°E
	Kesselquelle	700 L/s; 25 cu ft/s	Zwiefalten	Germany (Baden-Württemberg)	Danube		48.229677°N 9.4526°E
	Kocherursprung	680 L/s; 24 cu ft/s	Oberkochen	Germany (Baden-Württemberg)	Rhine		48.772097°N 10.095367°E
	Krasny Klyuch (ru)	14,880 L/s; 525 cu ft/s	Krasny Klyuch	Russia (Bashkortostan)	Volga		55.37666°N 56.679615°E
	Lippequelle	740 L/s; 26 cu ft/s	Bad Lippspringe	Germany (Nordrhein-Westfalen)	Rhine		51.781489°N 8.822225°E
	Le Bouillon		Orléans	France (Département Loiret)	Loire		47.850278°N 1.9375°E
	Louequelle	6,890 L/s; 243 cu ft/s	Ouhans	France (Département Doubs)	Rhone	1760	47.011389°N 6.298611°E
	Paderquellen	5,000 L/s; 180 cu ft/s	Paderborn	Germany (Nordrhein-Westfalen)	Rhine		51.719064°N 8.750128°E
	Palfauer Wasserloch	2,000 L/s; 71 cu ft/s	Palfau	Austria (Steiermark)	Danube		47.714093°N 14.856992°E
	Pießling-Ursprung	2,000 L/s; 71 cu ft/s	Roßleithen	Austria (Oberösterreich)	Danube	ca. 95	47.692722°N 14.276028°E
	Résurgence de la Vis	5,260 L/s; 186 cu ft/s	Vissec	France (Département Gard)	Hérault		44.018889°N 3.474722°E
	Rhumequelle	2,000 L/s; 71 cu ft/s	Rhumspringe	Germany (Niedersachsen)	Weser		51.589656°N 10.310175°E
	Rinquelle		Amden	Switzerland (Kanton St. Gallen)	Rhine	ca. 50	47.138099°N 9.165092°E
	Salzaspring	704 L/s; 24.9 cu ft/s	Nordhausen	Germany (Thüringen)	Elbe		51.530192°N 10.761945°E
	Siebenbrünnen		Lenk	Switzerland (Kanton Bern)	Rhine		46.412375°N 7.479786°E
	Sorgue-Quelle	21,000 L/s; 740 cu ft/s	Fontaine-de-Vaucluse	France (Département Vaucluse)	Rhone	ca. 1100	43.919564°N 5.131465°E
	Source de l'Orbe		Vallorbe	Switzerland (Vaud)	Rhine		46.697993°N 6.34537°E
	Source du Lison		Nans-sous-Sainte-Anne	France (Département Doubs)	Rhone		46.965556°N 6.011389°E
	Syri i Kaltër	6,000 L/s; 210 cu ft/s	Saranda	Albania (Vlora)	Bistrica		39.923611°N 20.192778°E
	Te Waikoropupu Springs	14,000 L/s; 490 cu ft/s	Takaka	New Zealand (Tasman District)	Takaka		40°50′52″S 172°46′10″E
	Wakulla Springs	260 million US gal/d 11,000 L/s	Wakulla County, Florida	US (Florida)	Wakulla/St. Marks		
	Divje jezero		Idrija	Slovenia (Goriška)	Jezernica		45.98229°N 14.02812°E
	Wimsener Höhle	590 L/s; 21 cu ft/s	Zwiefalten	Germany (Baden-Württemberg)	Danube		48.256777°N 9.448242°E
	Jacob's Well		Wimberly	USA (Texas)	Guadalupe River		30.03437°N 98.126016°W
	Lathkill Head Cave		Peak District	England (Derbyshire)	Trent		SK170658
	Baotu Spring	3,470–4,050 L/s	Jinan	China (Shandong)	Xiaoqing River		36°39′38.52″N 117°0′33.84″E
	Black Tiger Spring (Heihu Spring)		Jinan	China (Shandong)	Xiaoqing River		36°39′43.8″N 117°1′38″E
	Five Dragon Pool (Wulongtan)		Jinan	China (Shandong)	Xiaoqing River		36°39′54.36″N 117°0′30.96″E
	Pearl Spring (Zhenzhu Spring)		Jinan	China (Shandong)	Xiaoqing River		36°40′1.6″N 117°1′8″E
