= Five Dragon Pool =

Pond in Jinan, China

Coordinates: 36°39′54.36″N 117°0′30.96″E

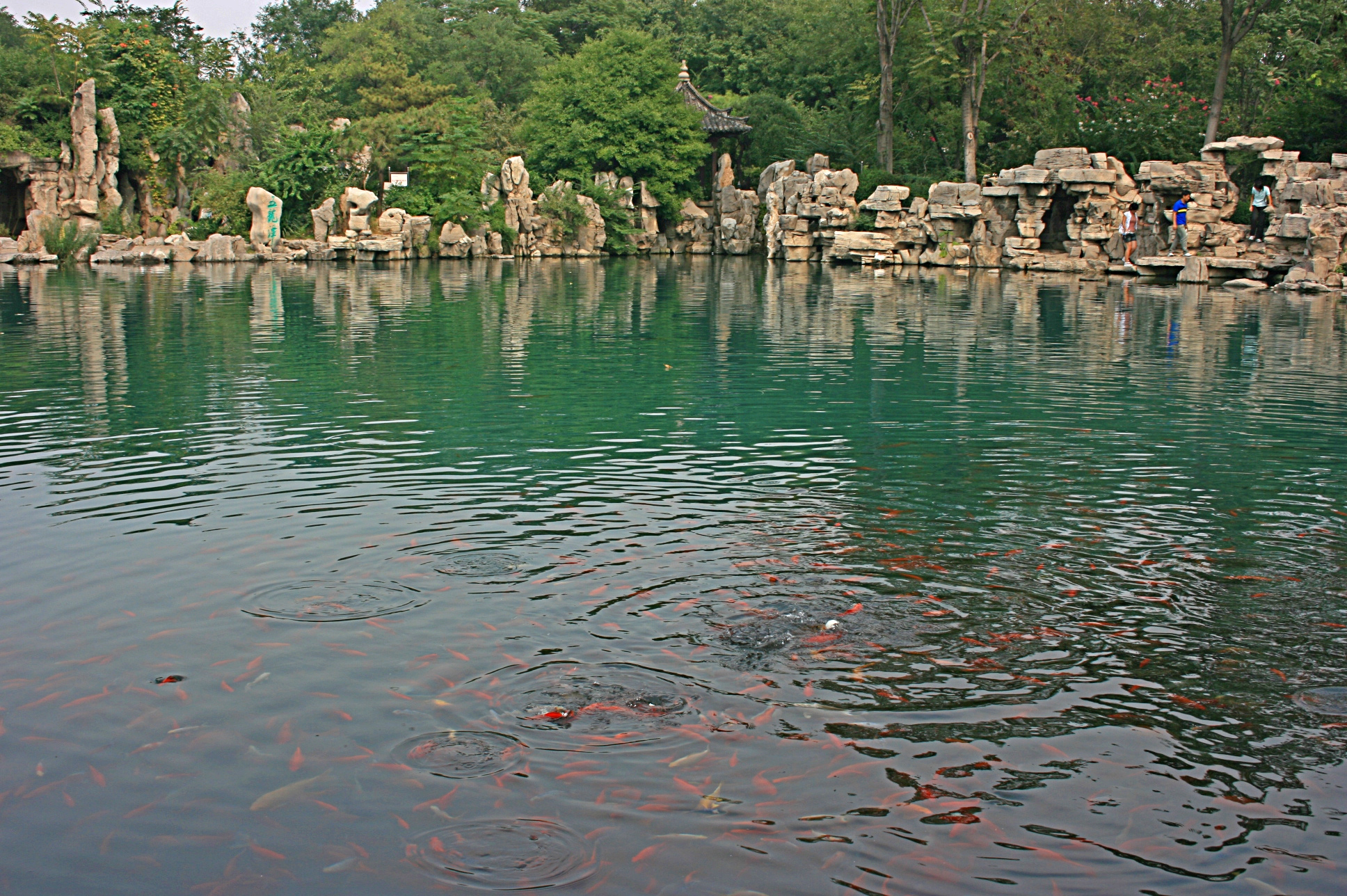
- Traditional Chinese: 五龍潭公園
- Simplified Chinese: 五龙潭公园
- Literal meaning: Five Dragon Pool Public Park
Transcriptions
Standard Mandarin
- Hanyu Pinyin: Wǔlóngtán Gōngyuán
- Wade–Giles: Wu-lung-t'an Kung-yüan

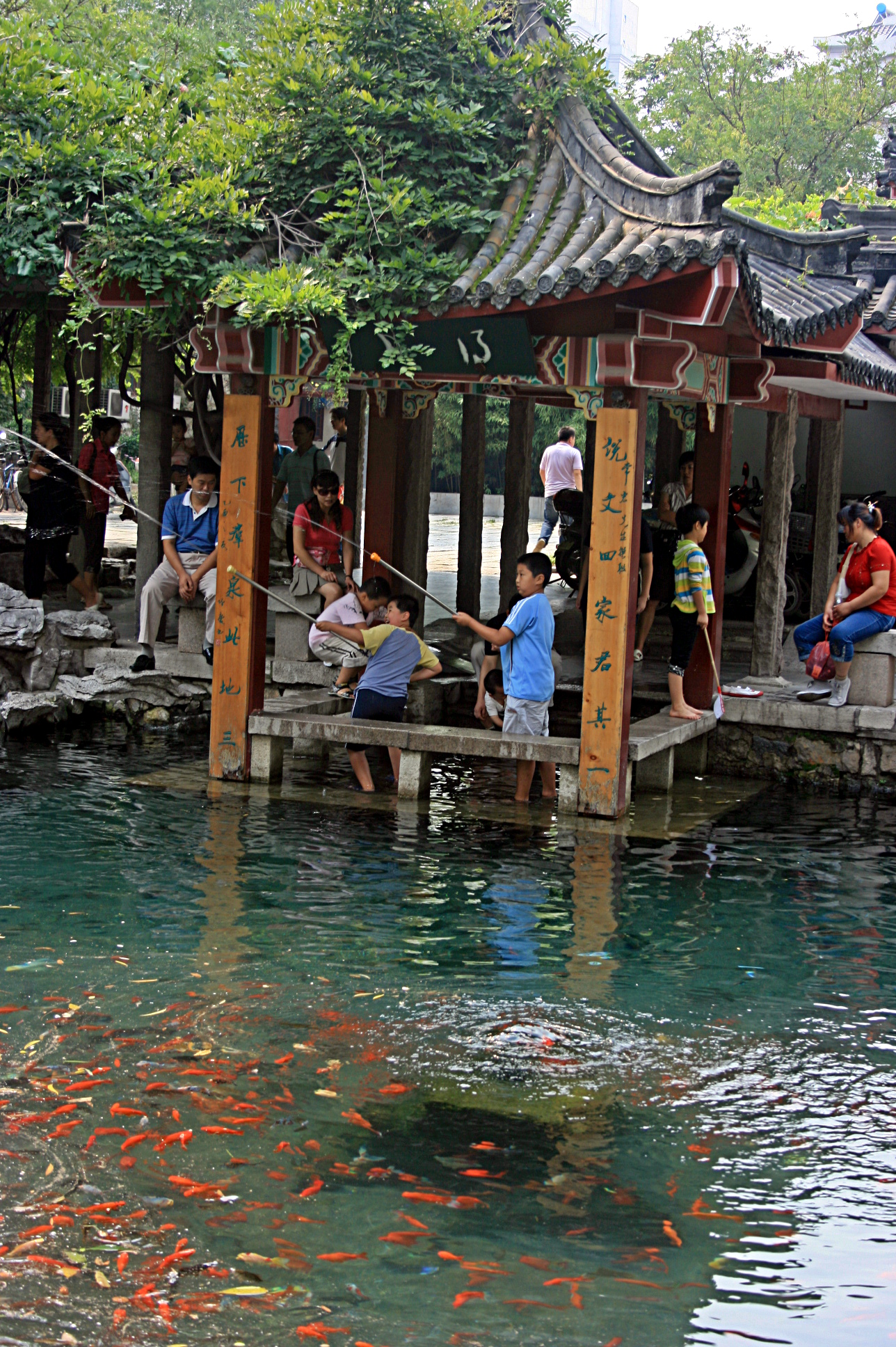
Pavilion at the edge of a spring pool in the Five Dragon Pool Park

The Five Dragon Pool or Wulongtan is a culturally significant pond fed by artesian karst springs in the city of Jinan, Shandong province, China. It is one of the best known springs among the 72 famous springs of Jinan.

The spring that supplies the water for the Five Dragon Pool belongs to a group of springs that also contains 28 other springs, such as the Tianjing Spring, Seventy-Third Spring, Ximizhi Spring, Dongmizhi Spring, Yueya Spring, Jing Spring, and the Congming Spring. The water of the Five Dragon Spring originates from the deepest circulation of all the springs in Jinan City.

Legend links the Five Dragon Pool to the Tang dynasty general Qin Shubao, whose residence is said to have stood at the site. According to the legend, the spring pool formed after torrential rains that submersed Qin Shubao's home.

In 1985, the Five Dragon Pool Public Park was established and the garden landscape surrounding the springs was restored

== Springs in the group ==
- Gu Wen Spring (Chinese: 古温泉; pinyin: Gǔ Wēn Quán)
- Xianqing Spring (Chinese: 贤清泉; pinyin: Xiánqīng Quán)
- Tianjing Spring (Chinese: 天镜泉; pinyin: Tiānjìng Quán)
- Yueya Spring (Chinese: 月牙泉; pinyin: Yuèyá Quán)
- Ximizhi Spring (Chinese: 西蜜脂泉; pinyin: Xīmìzhī Quán)
- Guanjiachi Spring (Chinese: 官家泉; pinyin: Guānjiā Quán)
- Huima Spring (Chinese: 回马泉; pinyin: Huímǎ Quán)
- Qiuxi Spring (Chinese: 虬溪泉; pinyin: Qiúxī Quán)
- Jade Spring (Chinese: 玉泉; pinyin: Yù Quán)
- Lian Spring (Chinese: 濂泉; pinyin: Lián Quán)

== Location ==
The Five Dragon Pool is located to the west of the historical city center of Jinan and to the north of the Baotu Spring. The street address of the park is No. 18 Kuangshi Street, Shizhong District, Jinan City, People's Republic of China.

== See also ==
- Baotu Spring (nearby)
- Black Tiger Spring
- Pearl Spring
- List of sites in Jinan
