= Wild Lake =

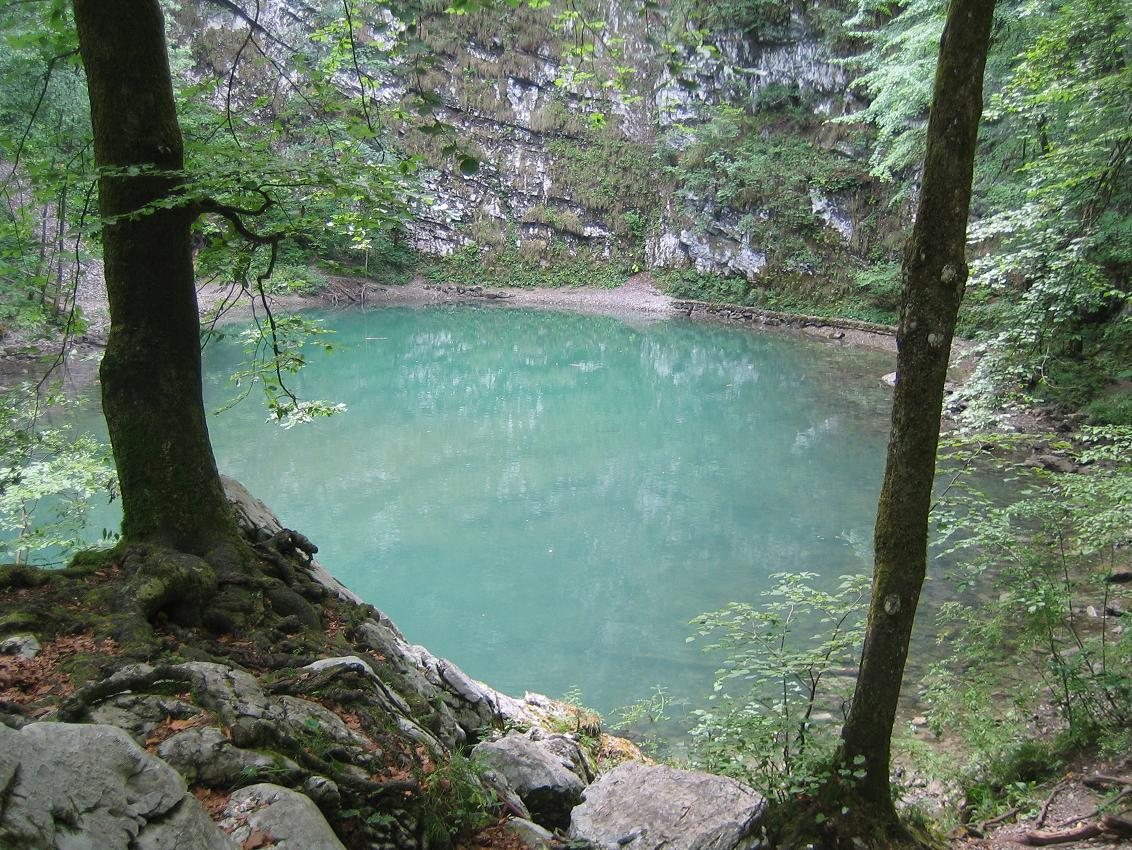

- Location within Slovenia
- Location: near Idrija, Slovenia
- Coordinates: 45°58′56″N 14°1′41″E
- Type: karst siphon lake
- Basin countries: Slovenia
- Max. depth: over 160 m (520 ft)
- Surface elevation: 340 metres (1,120 ft)

Wild Lake (Slovene: Divje jezero) is a lake near Idrija in western Slovenia and a karst spring of the Vauclusian type. The lake is the source of the Jezernica River, a tributary of the Idrijca and, at 55 metres (180 ft) long, the shortest river in Slovenia. Water flows from the submerged cave in the southern shore of the lake, out of a steeply inclined tunnel, explored to a depth of 160 metres (520 ft) and length of 415 metres (1,362 ft). The discharge occasionally surpasses 60 cubic metres per second (2,100 cu ft/s). However, when the water level is low, there is no outflow from the lake. In 1967, the lake was protected as a natural monument. In 1972, it was arranged to be the first Slovenian natural museum.

== See also ==
- List of deepest Dinaric caves
- List of karst springs
- List of longest Dinaric caves
