= Tuhala =

Village in Harju County, Estonia

- Village
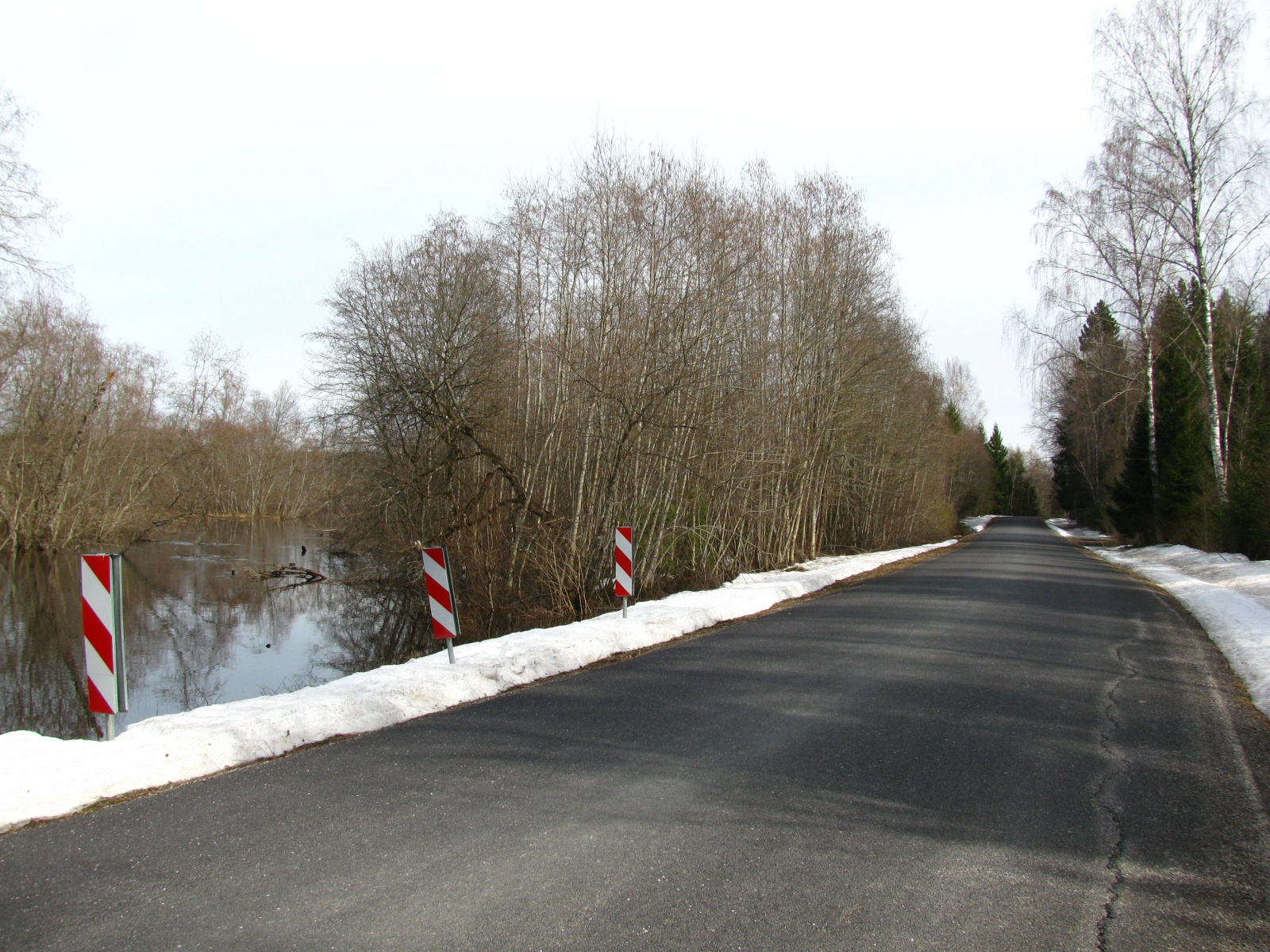
- Vaida–Urge road next to Pirita River in Tuhala

- Location in Estonia
- Coordinates: 59°13′29″N 24°58′04″E
- Country: Estonia
- County: Harju County
- Municipality: Kose Parish

Population (2011 Census)
  - Total: 105

Tuhala is a village in Kose Parish, Harju County in northern Estonia. As of the 2011 census, the settlement's population was 105. It is believed that settlement in Tuhala dates back around 3,000 years.

The Tuhala Karst Area, named after the village, lies for the most part in neighbouring Kata village. It has Estonia's largest area of porous karst, with several underground rivers and sinkholes. The karst area is best known for its Witch's Well (also in Kata).

== Tuhala Manor ==
Tuhala Manor was first mentioned in 1468 as Toall. It belonged to several Baltic German families: Tödwen (1468–1517); Delwig (1517 – mid-16th century); Ulrich (?–1663); Wrangell (1663–1693); Mellin (1692–1863); Lilienfeld (1863–1919). The cartographer Ludwig August Mellin was born in the manor. The last main building had two storeys and was built c. 1800. Its early Classical appearance was changed to a more Neoclassical appearance in the 1880s. The manor was burned down during the Revolution of 1905, along with more than 150 manors in Estonia. The manor was restored after burning but didn't find use and was demolished in the 1930s for building materials. Nowadays only few parts of the walls remain. Some of the outbuildings have been preserved. Tuhala manor park is preserved and is a protected site.

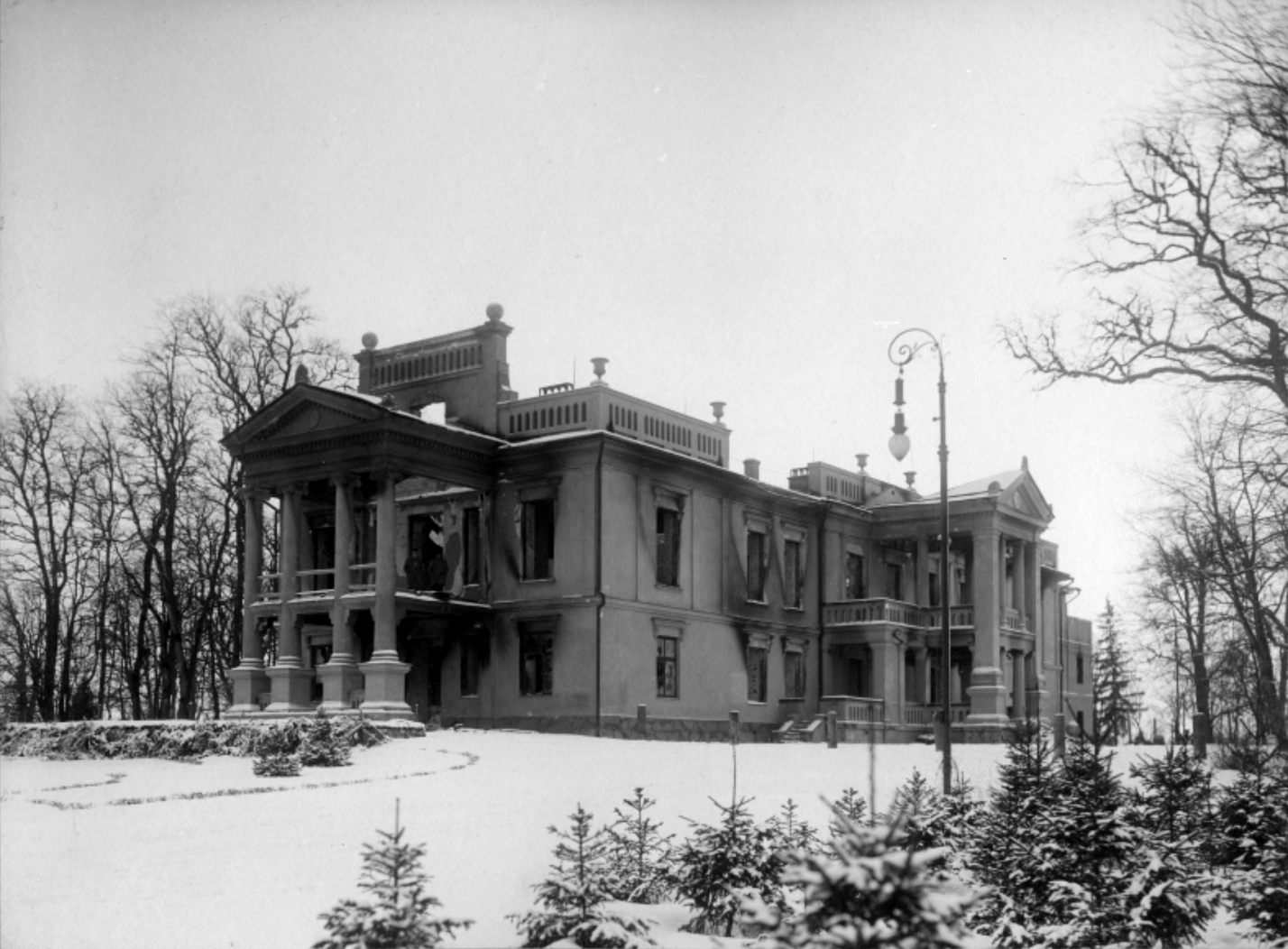
Tuhala Manor after the fire in 1905

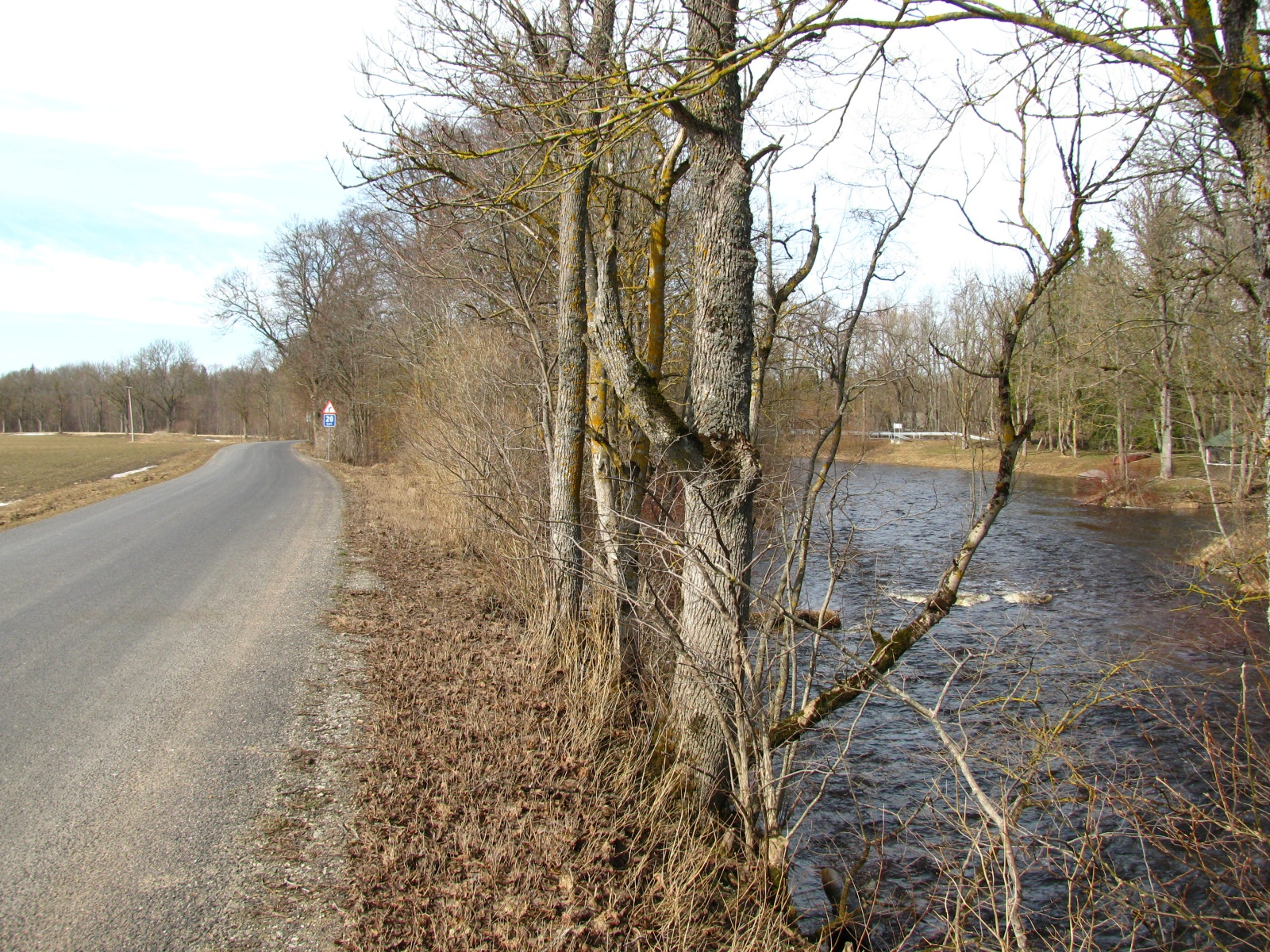
The Tuhala River in Tuhala

== Notable people ==
- Ludwig August Mellin (1754–1835), Baltic German politician, cartographer, writer and journalist, born in Tuhala Manor. There is a memorial to him in the Tuhala manor park.
- Hjalmar Mäe (1901–1978), Estonian politician, born in Tuhala
