= Ludwig August Mellin =

Baltic German politician, cartographer, writer and publicist

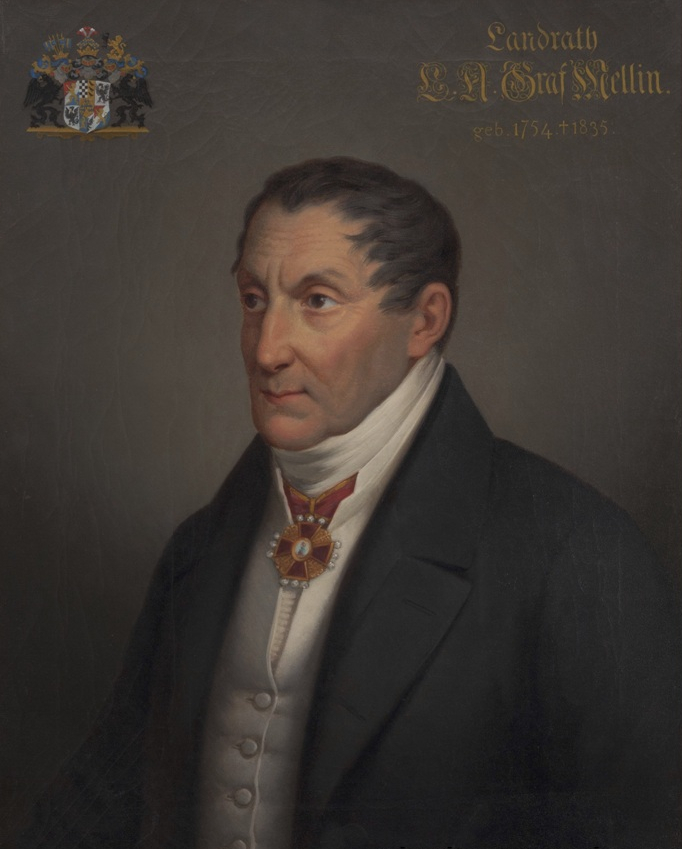
Portrait by Julius Gottfried Siegmund, 1891

Count Ludwig August Mellin (23 January 1754 in Tuhala, Governorate of Reval – 12 March 1835 in Riga, Governorate of Livonia) was a Baltic German politician, cartographer, writer and publicist. He is best known for creating the first professional atlas visualizing Livonia (area now divided between Estonia and Latvia), the Atlas von Liefland, oder von den beyden Gouvernementern u. Herzogthümern Lief- und Ehstland, und der Provinz Oesel in 1798.

Mellin was born in Tuhala (present day Estonia) in the manor of his father. He was educated at home by home tutor Berend Johann Campmann and could speak Latin at the age of 12 and studied mathematics. A French prisoner of war Claude Xavier Montagnon taught him French. Empress Catherine II assigned Mellin to join Holstein princes Wilhelm Augusti and Peter Friedrich Ludwig to Europe on an educational tour in 1767. He visited Riga in 1782. Mellin, a soldier in the Imperial Russian Army, became a cartographer at the request of Paul I of Russia, who wanted to see a map of Livonia. He was appointed district head and judge of Riga district in 1783. He worked as county councilor of Livonia from 1797 to 1818 and was involved in agrarian reforms. Since a professional map did not exist, Mellin was put in charge of creating it. In 1798, the Atlas von Liefland, oder von den beyden Gouvernementern u. Herzogthümern Lief- und Ehstland, und der Provinz Oesel, was published by Mellin. It took 28 years to complete it. Mellin used maps from private collections, the military, and the Russian Academy of Sciences. The map shows natural features such as islands, geology and shorelines of the region. The maps were so popular they were sold overseas. At one point, Mellin was accused of espionage because of where the maps were being sold. He was arrested. Paul I had the maps pulled off the market.
