= Krasny Klyuch =

Village in Mishkinsky District, Bashkortostan, Russia

Krasny Klyuch Красный Ключ
- Village
- Location within Bashkortostan Location within Russia
- Coordinates: 55°26′N 56°12′E
- Country: Russia
- Region: Bashkortostan
- District: Mishkinsky District
- Time zone: UTC+5:00

Krasny Klyuch (Russian: Красный Ключ) is a rural locality (a village) in Kameyevsky Selsoviet, Mishkinsky District, Bashkortostan, Russia. The population was 3 as of 2010. There is 1 street.

== Geography ==
Krasny Klyuch is located 27 km southeast of Mishkino (the district's administrative centre) by road. Bayturovo is the nearest rural locality.
