= Black Tiger Spring =

Karst spring in Jinan, Shandong, China

Coordinates: 36°39′43.8″N 117°1′38″E

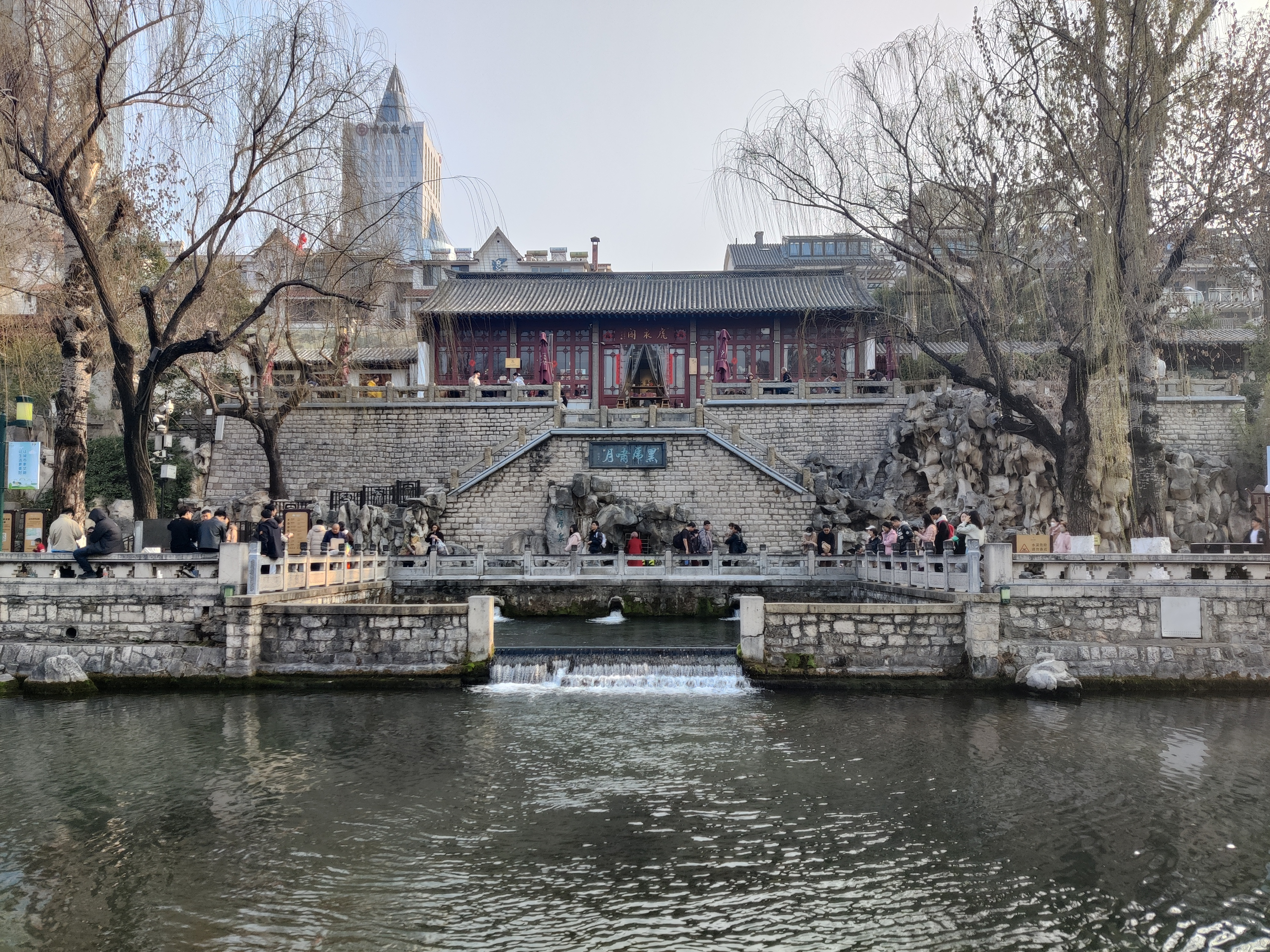
Black Tiger Spring in winter

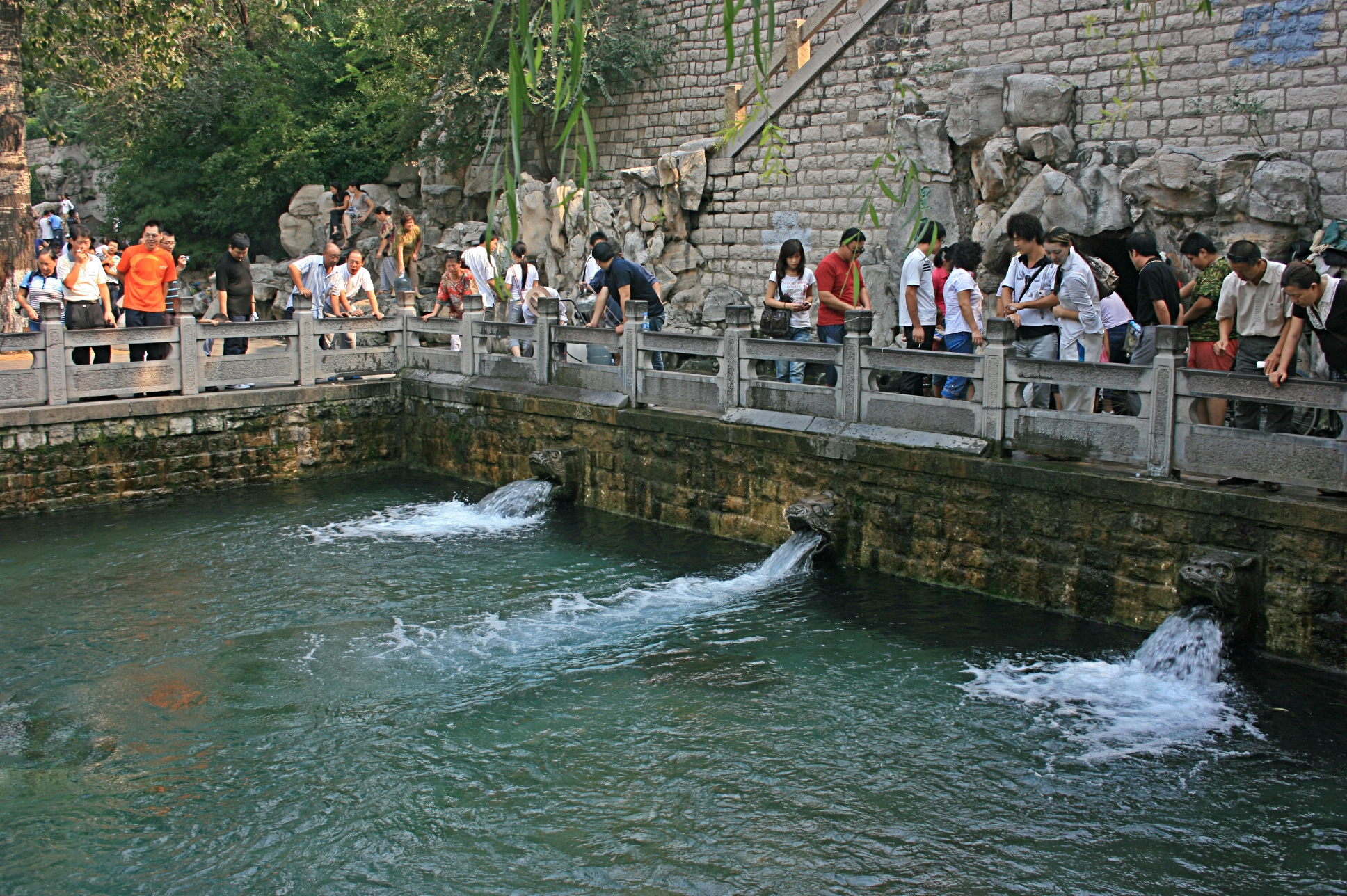
Black Tiger Spring

Black Tiger Spring (Chinese: 黑虎泉; pinyin: Hēi Hǔ Quán) is a culturally significant artesian karst spring located in the city of Jinan, Shandong Province, China. The spring is ranked as the second most significant among the 72 named springs in Jinan (after the Baotu Spring). The water of the spring stems from moderately-deep circulation and emerges from a water-filled limestone cave in a steep cliff. From the mouth of the cave, the water is funneled to flow out of the mouths of three ornamental stone-carved tiger heads into a square-shaped spring pool. From there it runs into the old city moat, next to which the spring is located. According to the tradition, there was a black rock lying in front of the cave in ancient times. The name of the spring is said to be derived from the shape and color of the rock, which resembled a black tiger, and the sound of the water gushing past the rock being reminiscent of the roar of a tiger. The ancient layout of the spring is described in a poem by the Ming Dynasty poet, Yan Bizeng.

== Location ==
The Black Tiger Spring is located on the south bank of the old city moat, close to the southeastern corner of the moat. A bit to the east, on the opposite site of the moat stands the Liberation Pavilion that commemorates the arrival of the victorious People's Liberation Army in Jinan.

== See also ==
- List of sites in Jinan
