= Yield (hydrology) =

The term yield is used to describe the volume of water escaping from a spring over a certain period of time, the discharge quantity of which is measured in [l/s]. Measurement methods include volume–filling-time measurement and water level measurement.

The discharge of a spring can fluctuate to a greater or lesser extent depending on precipitation and evaporation. Karst springs show particularly large time-dependent differences in the discharge.

== Bibliography ==
Murawski, Hans and Wilhelm Meyer (2010). Geologisches Wörterbuch. 12th edn. Heidelberg: Spectrum.
