= Bishtinovo =

Bishtinovo Биштиново
- Village
- Location within Bashkortostan Location within Russia
- Coordinates: 55°22′N 56°11′E
- Country: Russia
- Region: Bashkortostan
- District: Blagoveshchensky District
- Time zone: UTC+5:00

Bishtinovo (Russian: Биштиново; Bashkir: Биштин, Biştin) is a rural locality (a village) in Ilikovsky Selsoviet, Blagoveshchensky District, Bashkortostan, Russia. The population was 169 as of 2010. There are 7 streets.

== Geography ==
Bishtinovo is located 55 km northeast of Blagoveshchensk (the district's administrative centre) by road. Bayturovo is the nearest rural locality.
