= Bayturovo =

Village in Mishkinsky District, Bashkortostan, Russia

Bayturovo Байтурово
- Village
- Location within Bashkortostan Location within Russia
- Coordinates: 55°24′N 56°12′E
- Country: Russia
- Region: Bashkortostan
- District: Mishkinsky District
- Time zone: UTC+5:00

Bayturovo (Russian: Байтурово; Bashkir: Байтур, Baytur) is a rural locality (a village) in Kameyevsky Selsoviet, Mishkinsky District, Bashkortostan, Russia. The population was 273 as of 2010. There are 6 streets.

== Geography ==
Bayturovo is located 24 km southeast of Mishkino (the district's administrative centre) by road. Bishtinovo is the nearest rural locality.
