= Baotu Spring =

Karst spring in Jinan, Shandong, China

Coordinates: 36°39′38.52″N 117°0′33.84″E

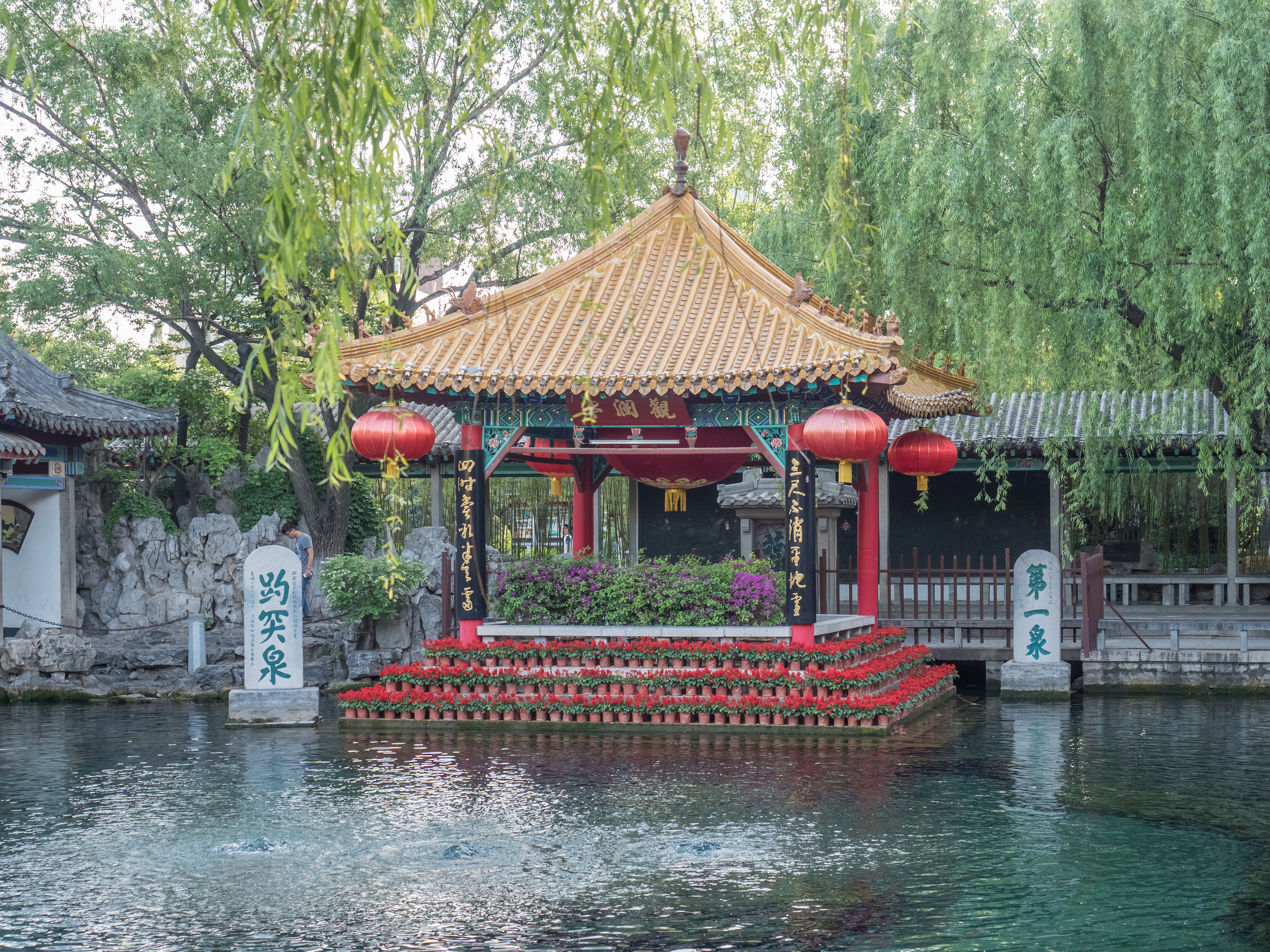
Spring pool with Guanlan Pavilion

The Baotu Spring (Chinese: 趵突泉; pinyin: Bàotū Quán, sometimes translated as "Jet Spring" or "Spurting Spring") is a culturally significant artesian karst spring located in the city of Jinan, Shandong, China. It is mentioned in the Spring and Autumn Annals, one of the Five Classics of Chinese literature, and was declared the "Number One Spring under the Heaven" (Chinese: 天下第一泉; pinyin: Tiānxià Dì-Yī Quán) by the Qianlong Emperor in the Qing dynasty.

The Baotu Spring is the most renowned among the more than 70 named artesian springs in the downtown area of the city of Jinan. The water of all these springs originates from an Ordovician karst aquifer under the city. As the terrain around Jinan slopes from the south down to the north, the recharge area for the aquifer is located in the mountainous area to the south of the city. The recharge area of the springs covers 1,500 square kilometres, out of which 550 km^{2} provide direct recharge and 950 km^{2} indirect recharge.

Altogether, the springs fed by the aquifer have a discharge of about 300,000-350,000 cubic metres per day. Since the 1970s, the springs have stopped flowing several times because too much water has been taken out from the aquifer for human consumption (more than 270,000 m^{3} per day in the 1970s).

The Baotu Spring is part of a cluster of about 20 named springs. Water age estimates suggest that its water originates from shallow circulation.

The spring pool of the Baotu Spring is fed by an underwater limestone water through three outlets; the volume of the water coming out of the spring can reach peak values up to 1.6 cubic metres per second. The water jets from the spring are said to have reached highs up to 26 metres. The water temperature remains constant of 18 degrees Celsius through the entire year.

== Other springs in the Baotu Group ==
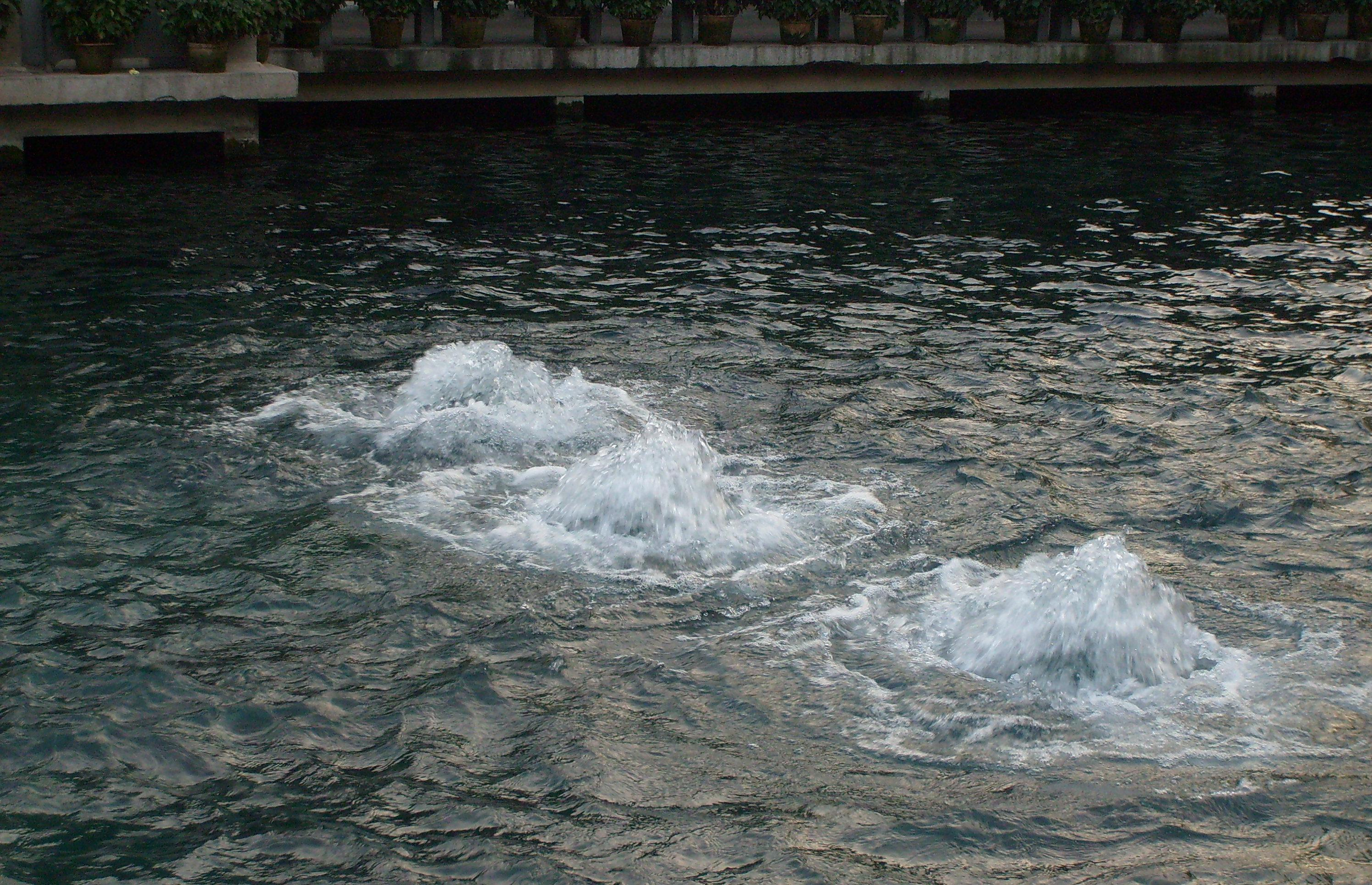
The spring

Among the other springs in the Baotu Group that are also on the list of the "seventy-two famous springs" (Chinese: 七十二名泉; pinyin: Qīshí'èr Míng Quán) in Jinan are:

- Jinxian Spring (Chinese: 金线泉; pinyin: Jīnxiàn Quán)
- Huanghua Spring (Chinese: 皇华泉; pinyin: Huánghuá Quán)
- Liuxu Spring (Chinese: 柳絮泉; pinyin: Liǔxù Quán)
- Woniu Spring (Chinese: 卧牛泉; pinyin: Wòniú Quán, literally "lying cattle spring")
- Shuyu Spring (Chinese: 漱玉泉; pinyin: Shùyù Quán)
- Mapao Spring (Chinese: 马跑泉; pinyin: Mǎpáo Quán)
- Wuyou Spring (Chinese: 无忧泉; pinyin: Wúyōu Quán, literally "carefree spring")
- Shiwan Spring (Chinese: 石湾泉; pinyin: Shíwān Quán)
- Zhanlu Spring (Chinese: 湛露泉; pinyin: Zhànlù Quán)
- Manjing Spring (Chinese: 满井泉; pinyin: Mǎnjǐng Quán)
- Dengzhou Spring (Chinese: 登州泉; pinyin: Dēngzhōu Quán)
- Dukang Spring (Chinese: 杜康泉; pinyin: Dùkāng Quán)
- Wangshui Spring (Chinese: 望水泉; pinyin: Wàngshuǐ Quán)

== History ==
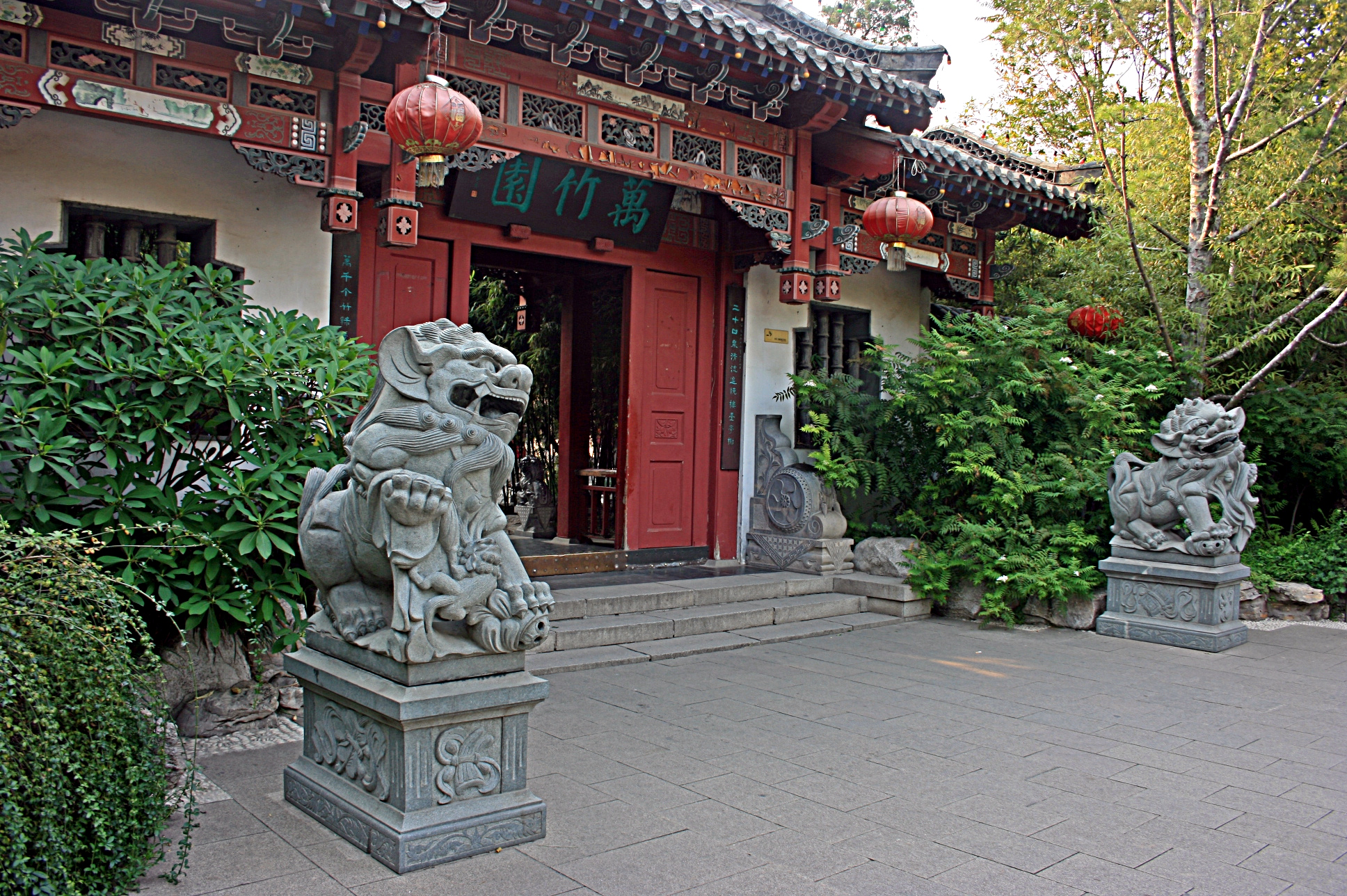
Entrance gate to the 10000 Bamboo Garden

The existence of the Baotu Spring has been dated back more than 3,500 years to the times of the Shang dynasty. The spring is mentioned in the Spring and Autumn Annals, the official chronicle of the ancient Lu state and one of the Five Classics of Chinese literature. The Baotu Spring is also described in the Shuijing Zhu ("Commentary on the Waterways Classic") compiled by the geographer Li Daoyuan during the Northern Wei dynasty. He writes that "spring gushes up, water gushing like wheel". In Li Daoyuan's time, the Baotu Spring and adjacent springs formed the source of the ancient Luo River; it now flows into Daming Lake via the old city moat, then the Xiaoqing River. The present-day name of the spring refers to the gushing up of the water. It dates back to the Song dynasty; previously the spring had been known under different names such as "Baoliu" and "Lanquan".

The area of the Baotu Spring as well as some neighboring springs in the same group are protected by a public park (Chinese: 趵突泉公园; pinyin: Bàotū Quán Gōngyuán). The park was created in 1956 and covers now about 10.5 hectares.

== Architecture ==
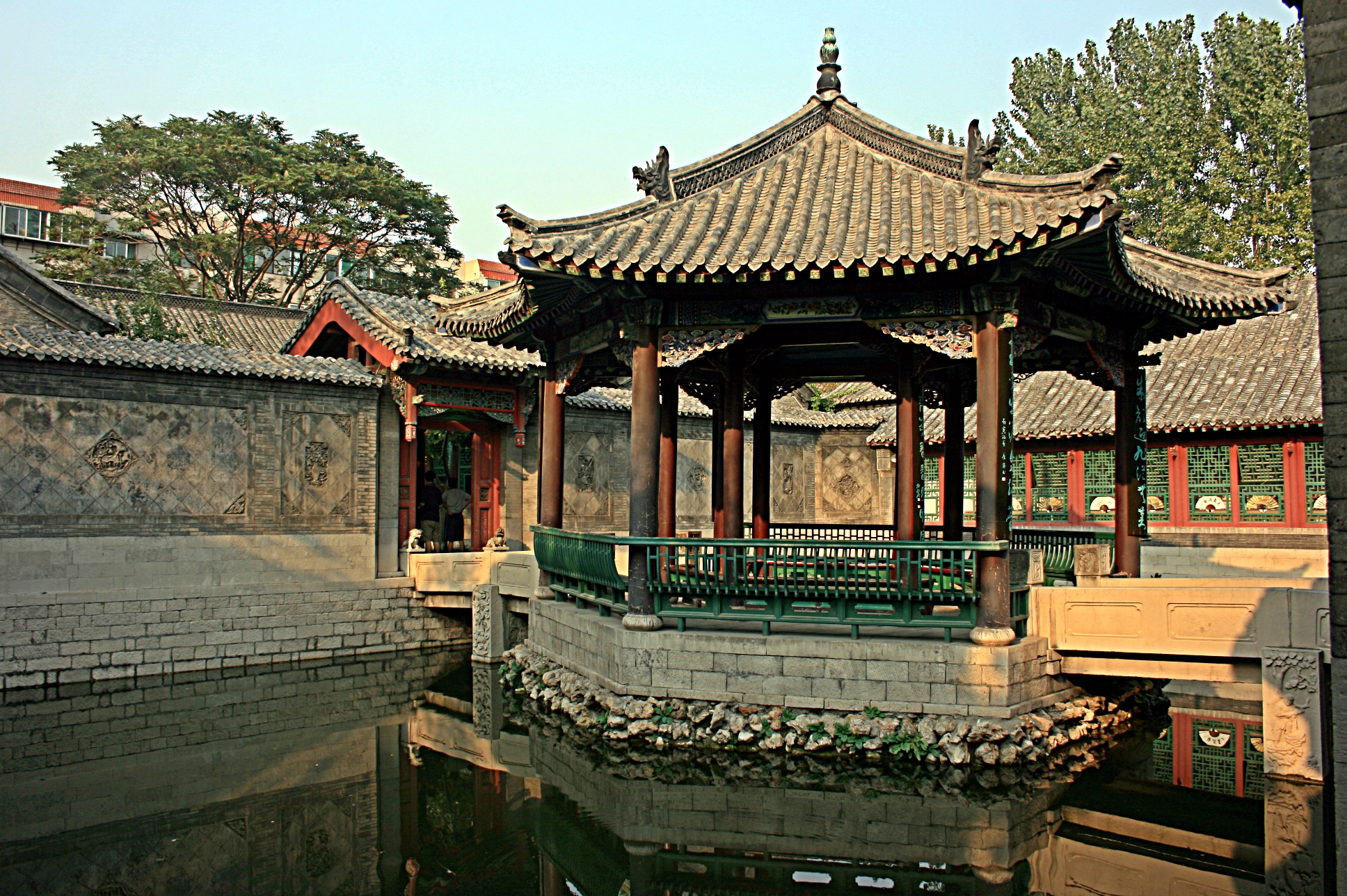
Courtyard pavilion in the 10,000 Bamboo Garden

The spring water feeds into a rectangular spring pool that extends 30 meters from east to west and 18 meters from north to south. The spring pool is surrounded by historical structures such as the Leyuan (or Luoyuan) Hall (Song dynasty, to the north of the spring), the Guanlan Pavilion (Ming dynasty, west of the spring), and the Laihe Bridge (built during the Wanli era in the Ming dynasty, east of the spring). Close by, on the shore of the spring's runoff stands the Wangheting Teahouse. Other noteworthy structures are the Banbi Corridor and the Waterside Chamber. The largest architectural ensemble is the 10,000 Bamboo Garden (Chinese: 万竹园; pinyin: Wànzhú Yuán). It comprises 186 buildings arranged around 13 courtyards as well as four pavilions and five bridges. Originally built during the Yuan dynasty, it served as the residence of the governor of Shandong during the Ming dynasty. Later, it was the home of the poet Wang Ping, who purchased it during the Qing dynasty in 1692. In 1912, Zhang Huaizhi, a commander of the local army who later became governor of Shandong Province, bought the garden and kept enlarging it from 1912 to 1927. Other gardens and architectural ensembles within the park are the Cang Garden (with the memorial to Wang Xuetao), the Luoyuan Garden, the Hundred Flowers Garden, and the (May 3rd Massacre) Memorial Garden.

== Culture ==
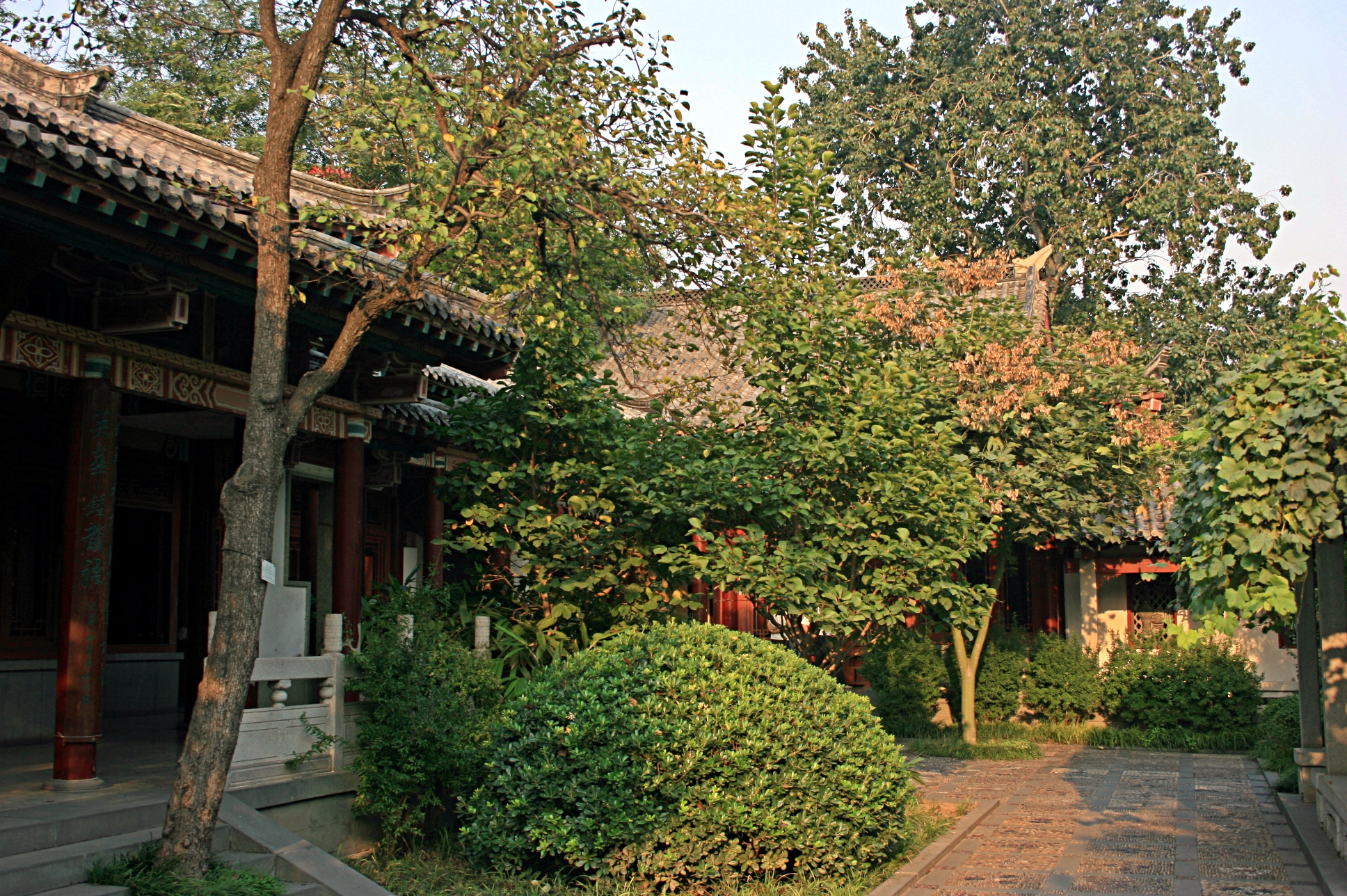
Courtyard of the memorial to Li Qingzhao

Baotu Spring has been a recurring subject of classic Chinese literature and has been written about by authors such as Zeng Gong (Song dynasty), Zhao Mengfu (Yuan dynasty), and Pu Songling (Qing dynasty). During the Qing dynasty, the Kangxi and Qianlong emperors visited the spring and left inscriptions there. The Qianlong Emperor conferred on it the honorary title "First Spring under the Heaven" (Chinese: 天下第一泉; pinyin: Tiānxià Dì-Yī Quán).

The Baotu Spring public park also houses memorials to the local painters Li Kuchan (1898–1983) and Wang Xuetao (1903–1982) as well as to the poet Li Qingzhao. The latter has a memorial hall set in a traditional courtyard dedicated to her.

The Baotu Spring is the site of an annual lantern festival (starts on the Chinese New Year day and lasts for one month, and a chrysanthemum show (since the 1970s, held from the end of October to the end of November.

A local beer brand ("Baotu Quan" beer produced by Jinan Beer Group Corporation) is named after the spring and said to be brewed with water from the spring.

== Location ==
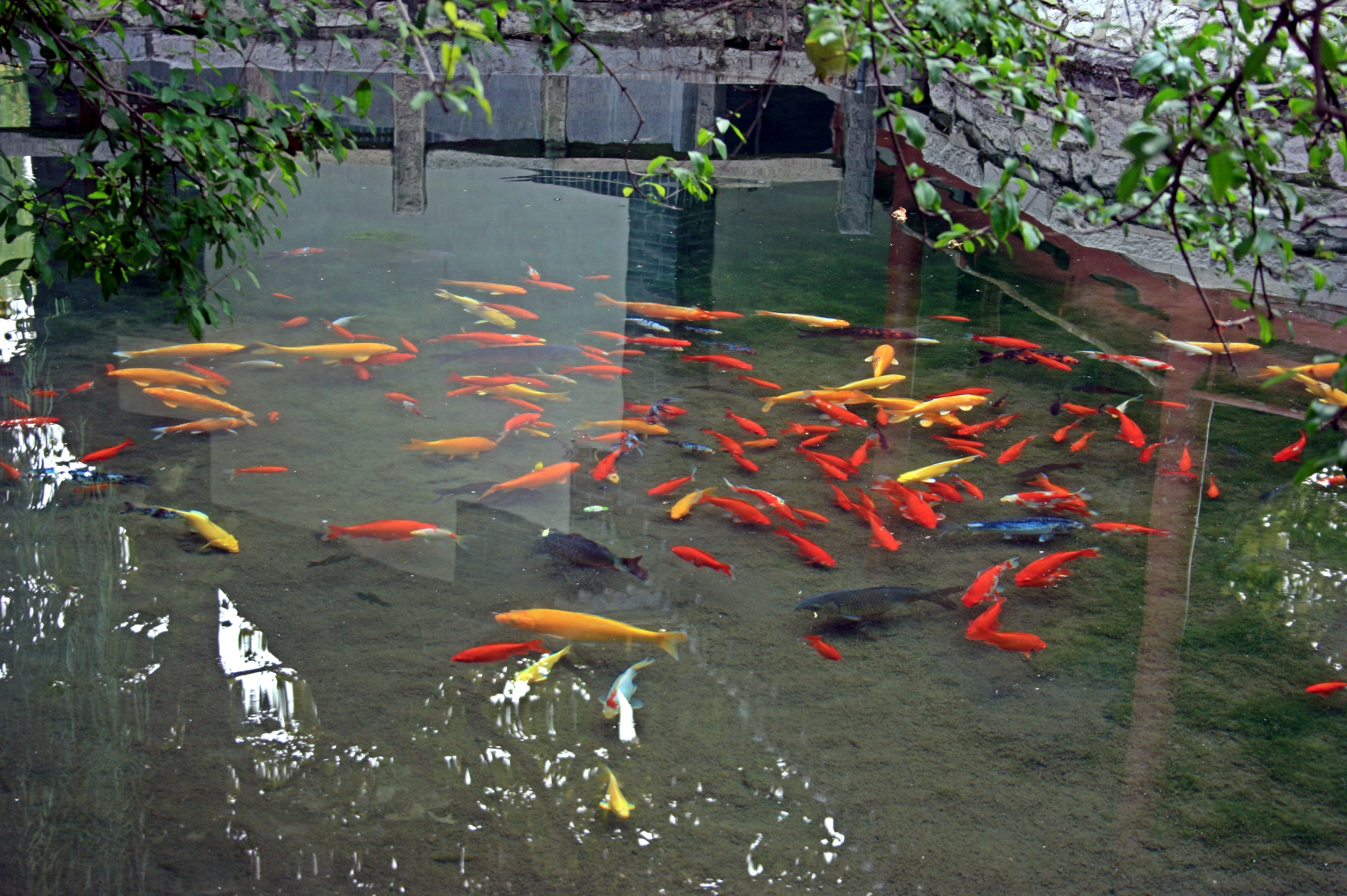
Goldfish

The Baotu Spring is located right to the southwest of the city center of Jinan, on the outer side of the old city moat and near the west end of Quancheng Road (Chinese: 泉城路; pinyin: Quán Chéng Lù); its street address is Baotu Spring South Road 1 (Chinese: 趵突泉南路1号; pinyin: Bàotū Quán Nán Lù 1 háo), Jinan, Shandong.

== See also ==
- List of sites in Jinan (contains list of springs)
