= Tuhala Witch's Well =

Karst spring in Estonia

Coordinates: 59°12′03″N 24°57′54″E

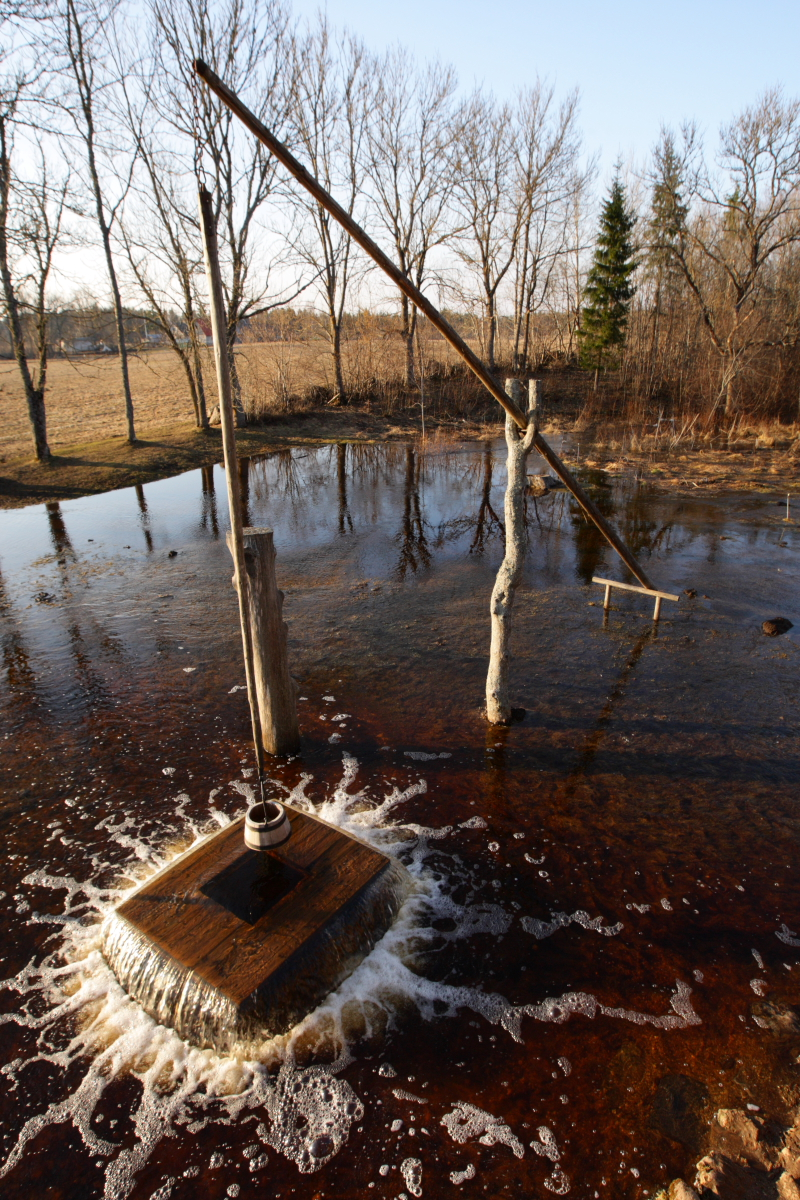
Tuhala Witch's Well (April 2010)

Tuhala Witch's Well (Estonian: Tuhala nõiakaev) is a karst spring in Kose Parish, Harju County, Estonia that overflows after heavy rains.

In Estonian folklore, it is said to be caused by witches lashing each other underground. In 2012 the Tuhala Witch's Well was voted as a "Wonder of Estonia".
