= Karst spring =

Groundwater source in certain geological conditions

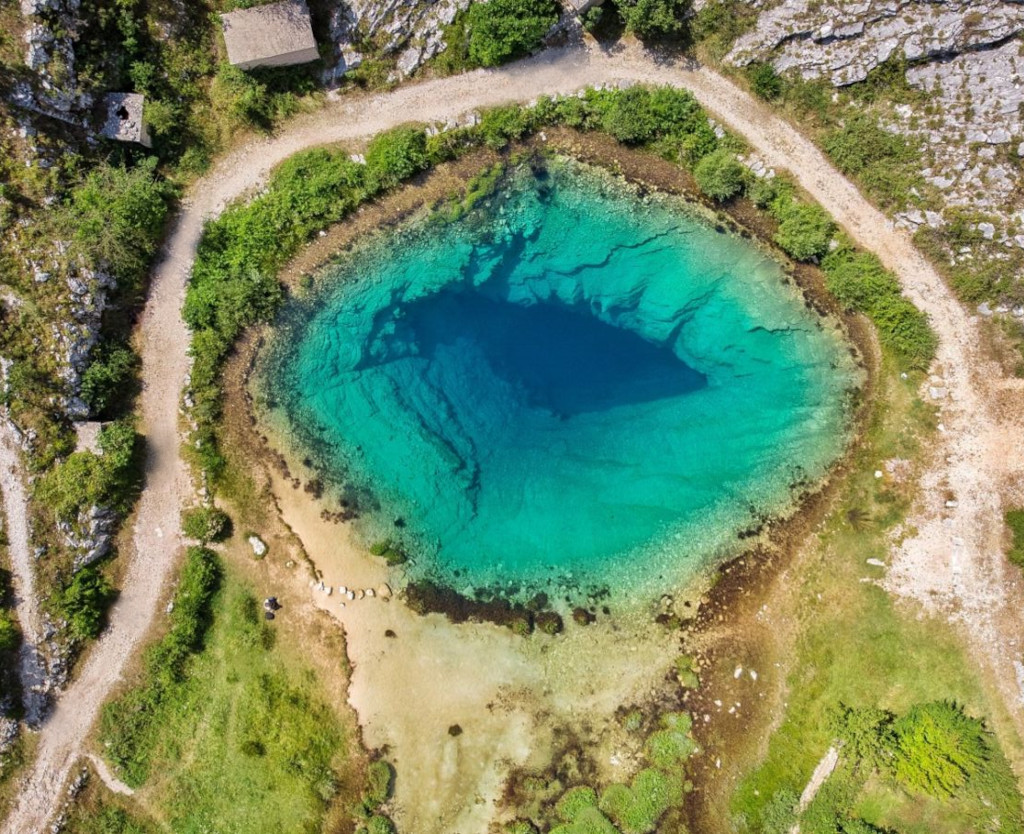
A 130-metre (430 ft) deep karst spring of the Cetina River in Croatia

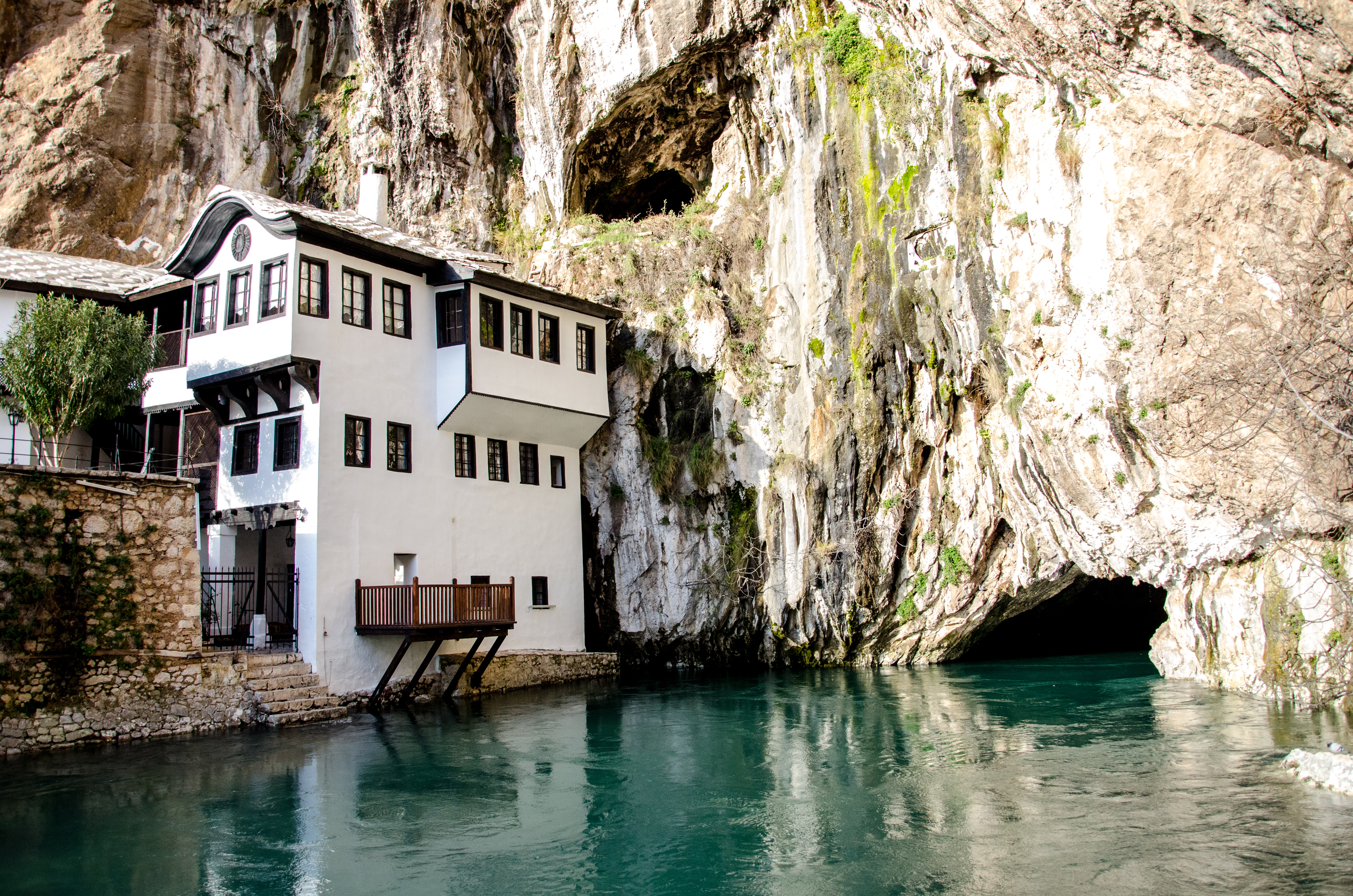
The Vrelo Bune (English: Wellspring of the Buna) with the Blagaj Tekke under a limestone cliff in Bosnia

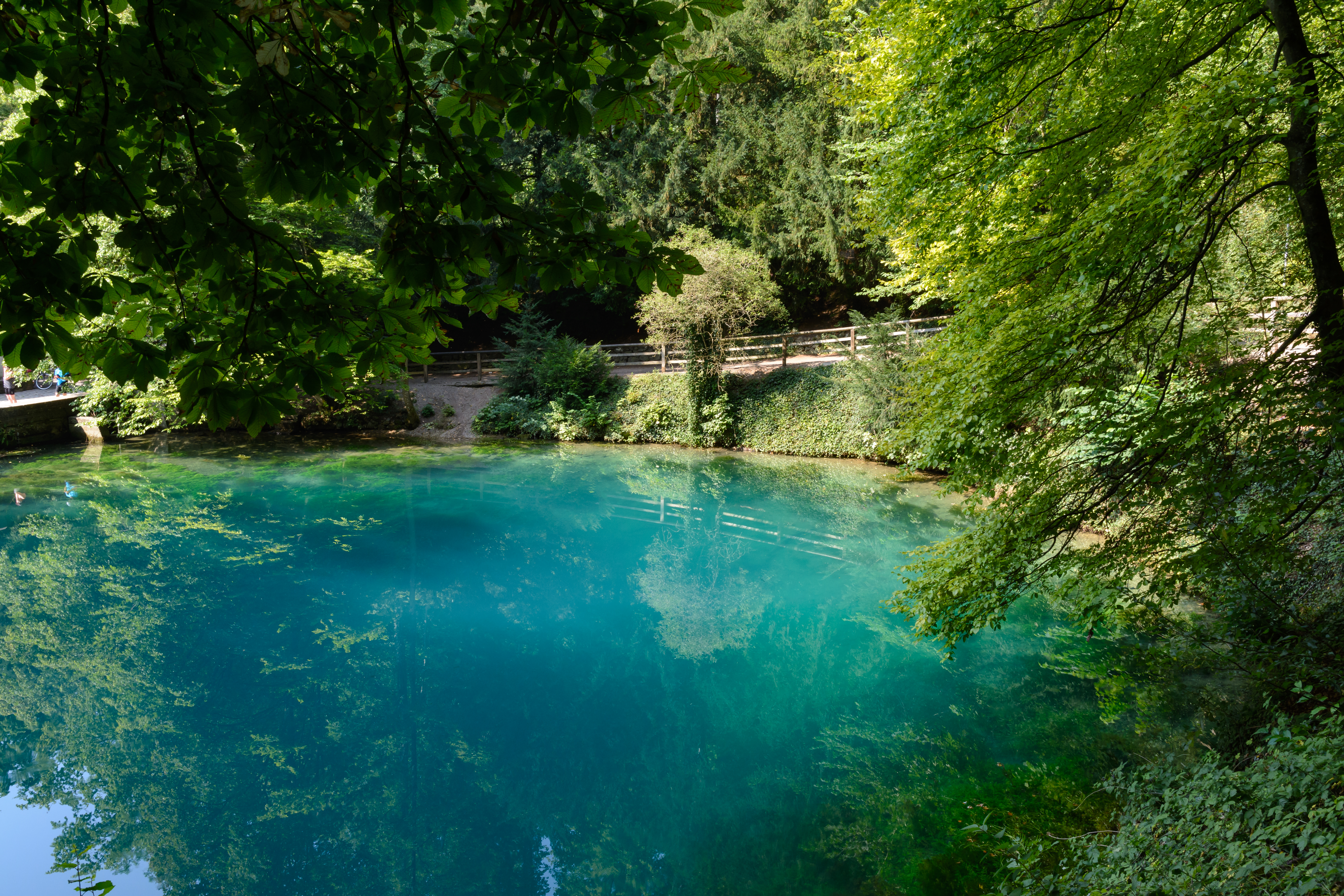
Blautopf (Blue Pot), karst spring of the River Blau (River Blue) in Blaubeuren, Swabian Jura

A karst spring or karstic spring is a spring (exsurgence, outflow of groundwater) that is part of a karst hydrological system.

== Description ==
Because of their often conical or inverted bowl shape, karst springs are also known in German-speaking lands as a Topf ("pot") which is reflected in names such as Aachtopf (the source of the Radolfzeller Aach) or Blautopf (the source of the Blau river in Blaubeuren).

Karst springs often have a very high yield or discharge rate, because they are often fed by underground drainage from a large catchment basin. Because the springs are usually the terminus of a cave drainage system at the place where a river cave reaches the Earth's surface, it is often possible to enter the caves from karst springs for exploration.

Large karst springs are located in many parts of the world; the largest ones are believed to be in Papua New Guinea, with others located in Mediterranean countries such as Bosnia and Herzegovina, Croatia, Turkey, Slovenia, and Italy.

== Types ==
An estavelle or inversac is a ground orifice which, depending on weather conditions and season, can serve either as a sink or as a source of fresh water. It is a type of sinkhole.

A Vauclusian spring is a spring that originates from a shaft or a cave system, with the water surging upwards under relatively high pressure. It is named after the Fontaine de Vaucluse in southern France.

Submarine karst springs, also known as vruljas, occur worldwide, and are most numerous in shallow waters of the Mediterranean Sea. They can be considered to be karst springs which have become submerged by rising sea levels.

For intermittent or rhythmic springs see below. They are part of another type of classification, which differentiates between perennial (with continuous flow), rhythmic, and temporary springs.

== Hydrological features ==
A main feature of karst springs is that water is rapidly transported by caverns, so that there is minimal filtering of the water and little separation of different sediments. Groundwater emerges at the spring within a few days from precipitation. Storms, snowmelt, and general seasonal changes in rainfall have a very noticeable and rapid effect on karst springs.

Many karst springs dry up during the driest part of the year, and are thus known as intermittent springs. Still others are dry most of the year round and only flow after heavy rain. Sources that only flow during wet years are often known in German as Hungerbrunnen ("hunger springs"), since folklore claimed a connection between the flow rate of a spring and poor crop yield in a wet year. This appears to be more of a culturally-related superstition, as scientific studies on various Hungerbrunnen have not confirmed such a relationship. An example is the Hungerbrunnen in the parish of Heuchlingen near Gerstetten.

The properties of karst springs make them unsuitable for the supply of drinking water. Their uneven flow rate does not support a steady rate of consumption, especially in summer when there is lower discharge but higher demand. In addition, poor filtering and high hardness mean that the water quality is poor.

== Cultural references ==
The French Realist painter Gustave Courbet (1819–1877) painted a number of karst springs among many landscapes he depicted in the Jura region of eastern France.

== Gallery ==
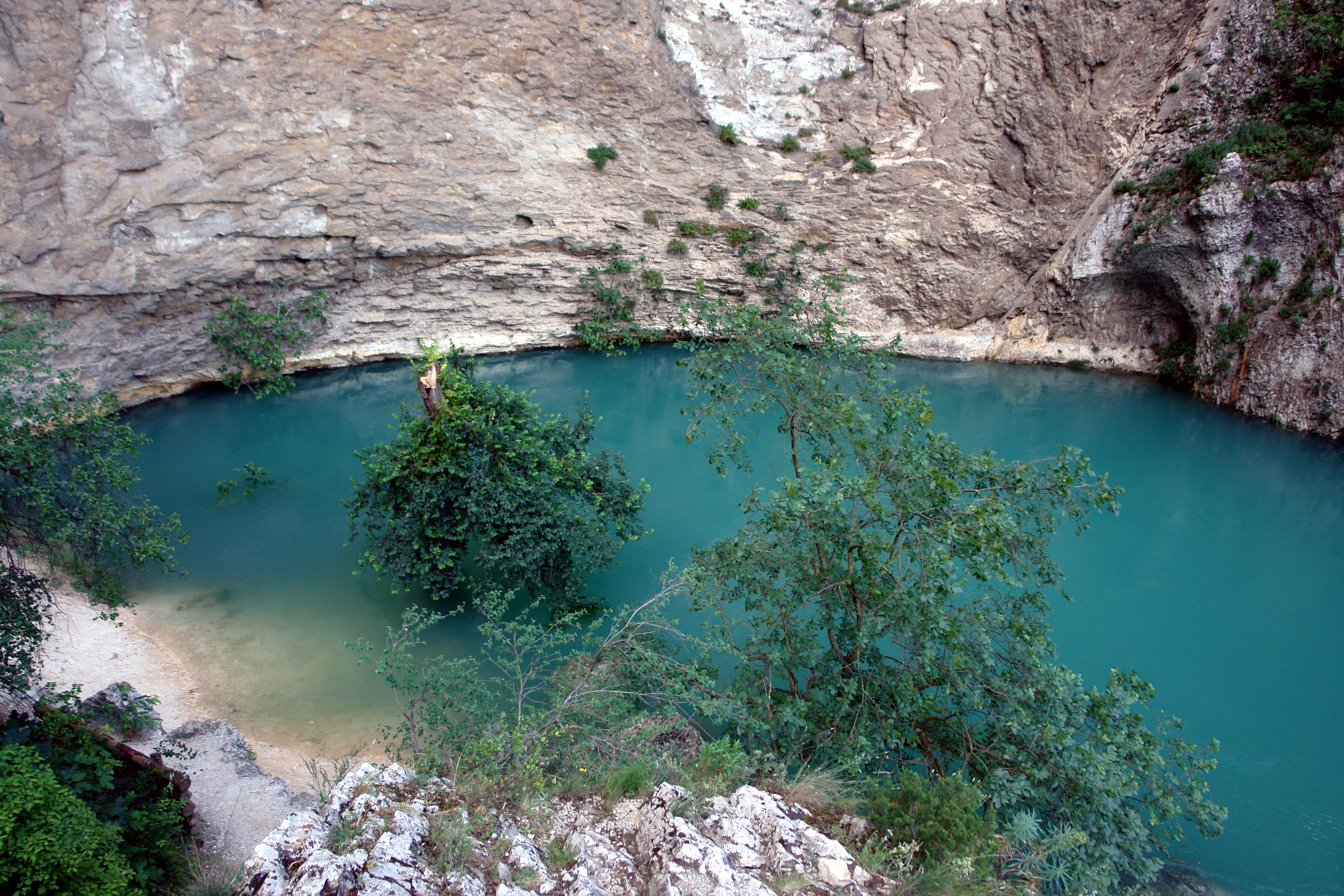
Fontaine-de-Vaucluse, karst spring of the Sorgue, characterised by an upward movement of water from the depth of over 315 metres (1,033 ft)

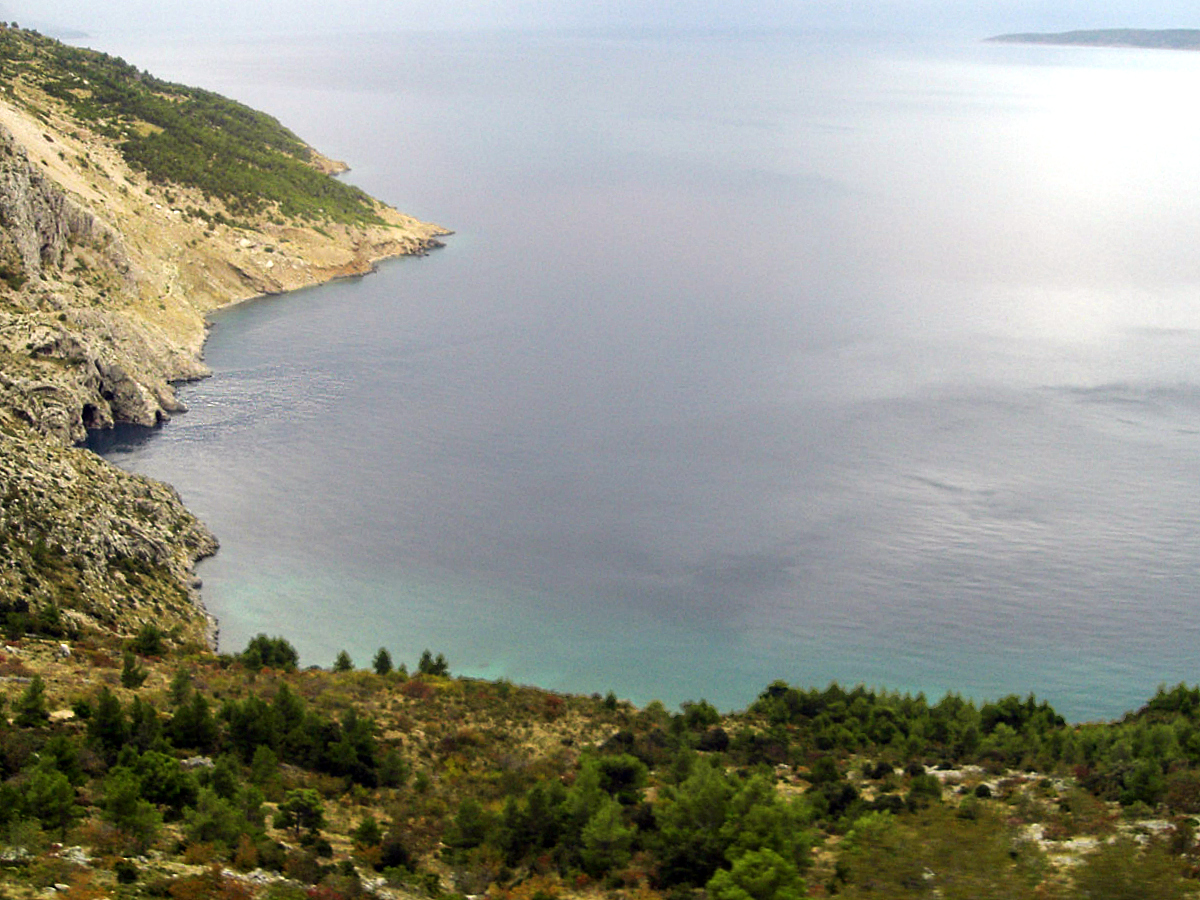
A submarine karst spring (vrulja), observed through sea surface rippling near Omiš

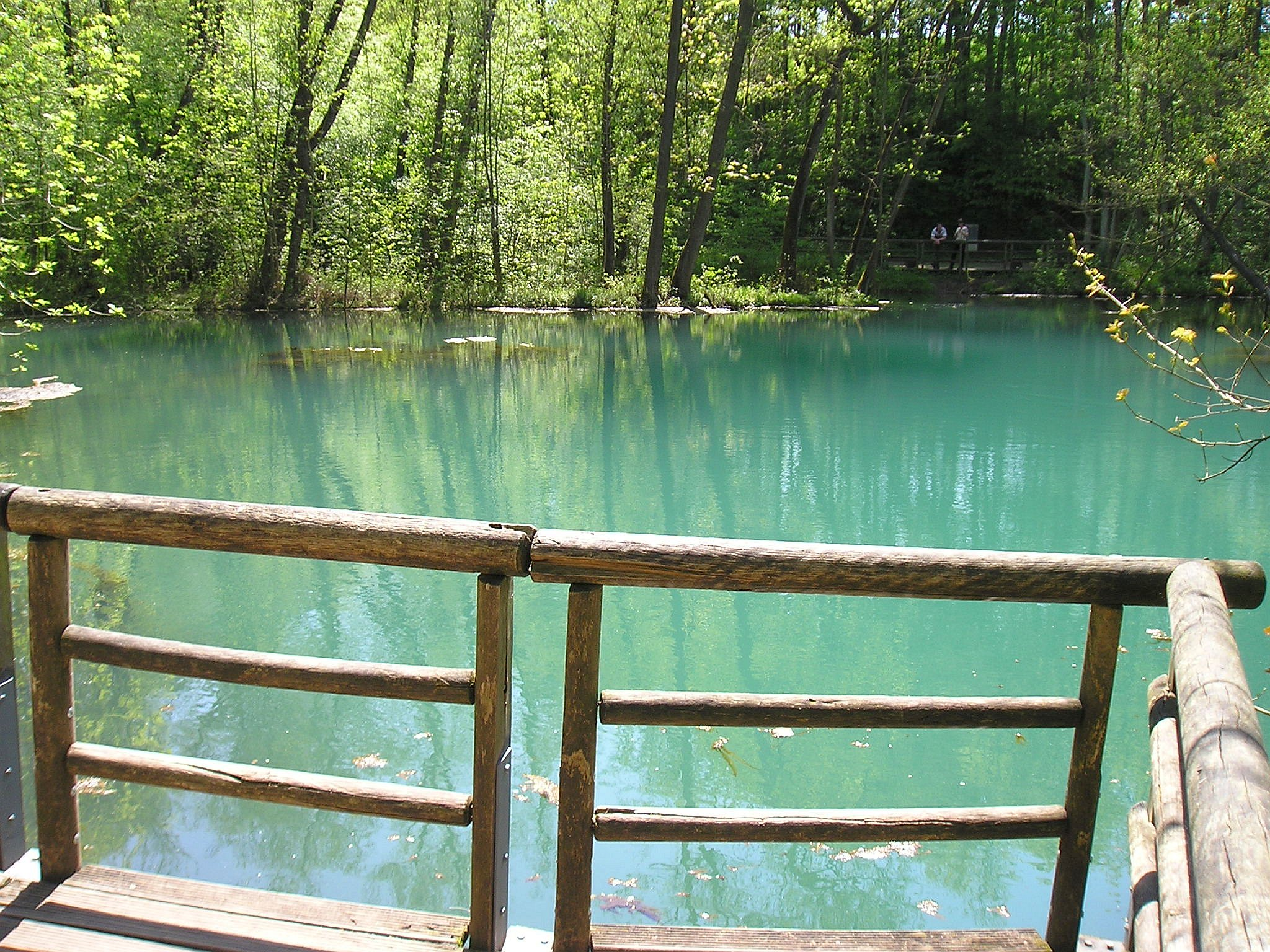
Rhumequelle (Rhume Spring), source of the Rhume, in Herzberg am Harz-Rhumasprung (de) right next to Rhumspringe

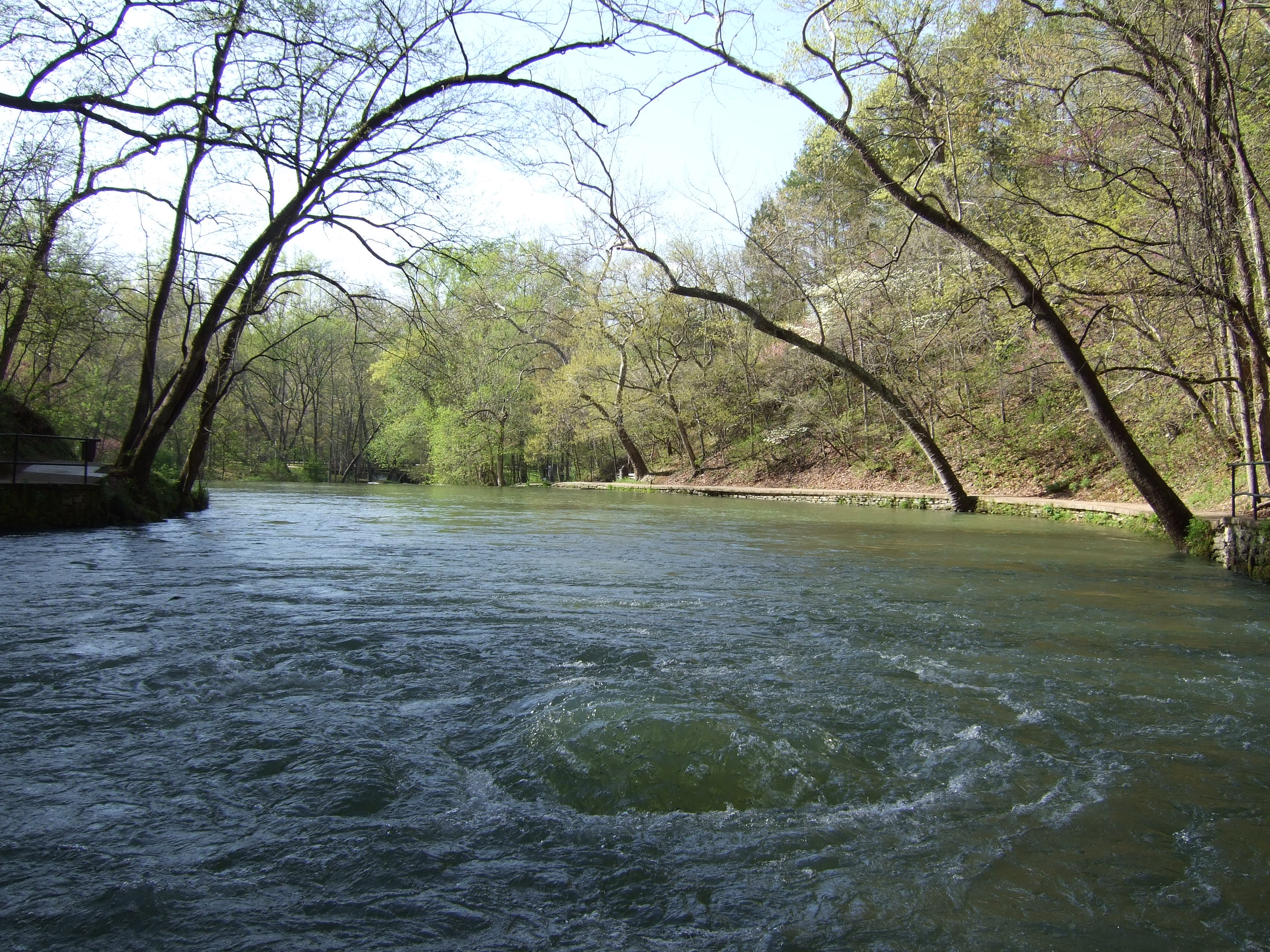
Maramec Spring in the Ozarks, Missouri

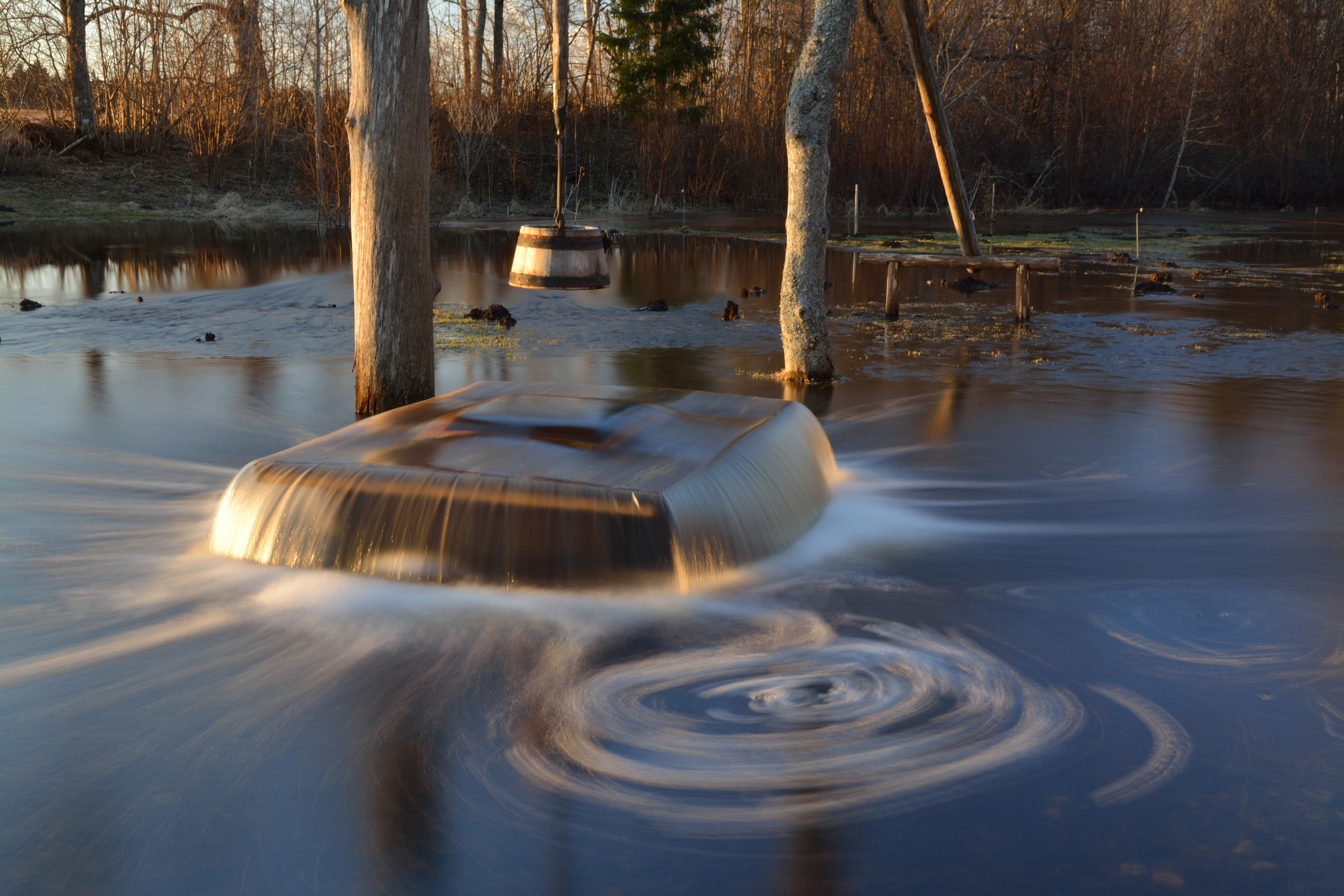
"Witch's Well" karst spring in Tuhala, Estonia

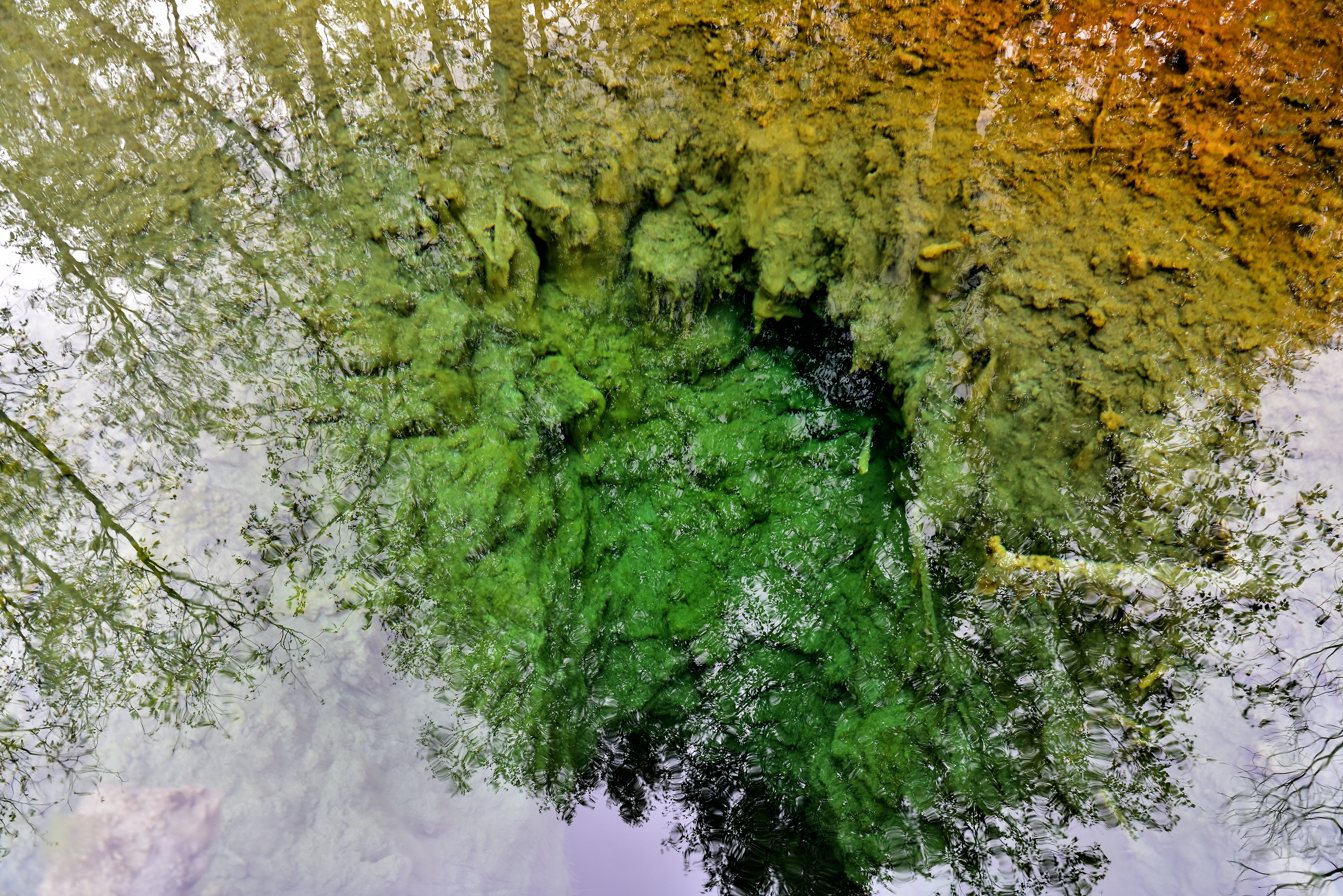
The Mshentsy spring, Bologovsky district, Tver region, Russia

== See also ==
- List of karst springs
- Ponor
- Cenote
- Thermokarst
