= Xiaoqing River =

River in Shandong, China

Coordinates: 36.6667°N 116.8333°E

Xiaoqing River (Chinese: 小清河; pinyin: Xiǎoqīng Hé) is a river in Shandong Province, China. It is part of the Bohai Sea basin and empties into Laizhou Bay. The river flows through the major city of Jinan. It is 216 kilometres (134 mi) long and drains a 10,336-square-kilometre (3,991 sq mi) basin, which also contains the city of Zibo.

== Ecology ==
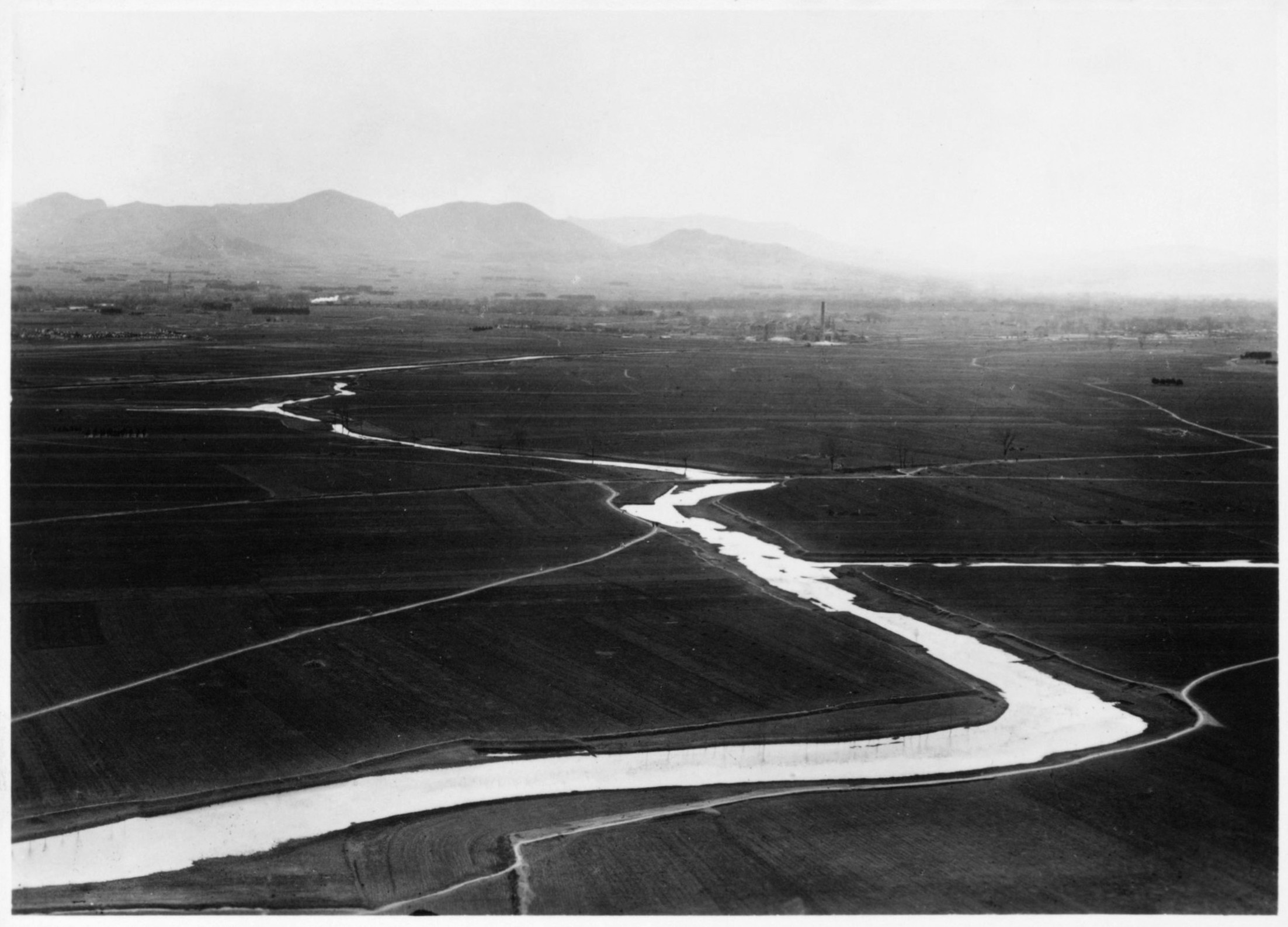
Xiaoqing River in the 1920s

The river has been noted as a major source of pollution in Laizhou Bay, with pollution control efforts influencing the abundance of phytoplankton species in the estuary.

== See also ==
- List of rivers in China
