= Major historical and cultural sites protected by Shandong Province =

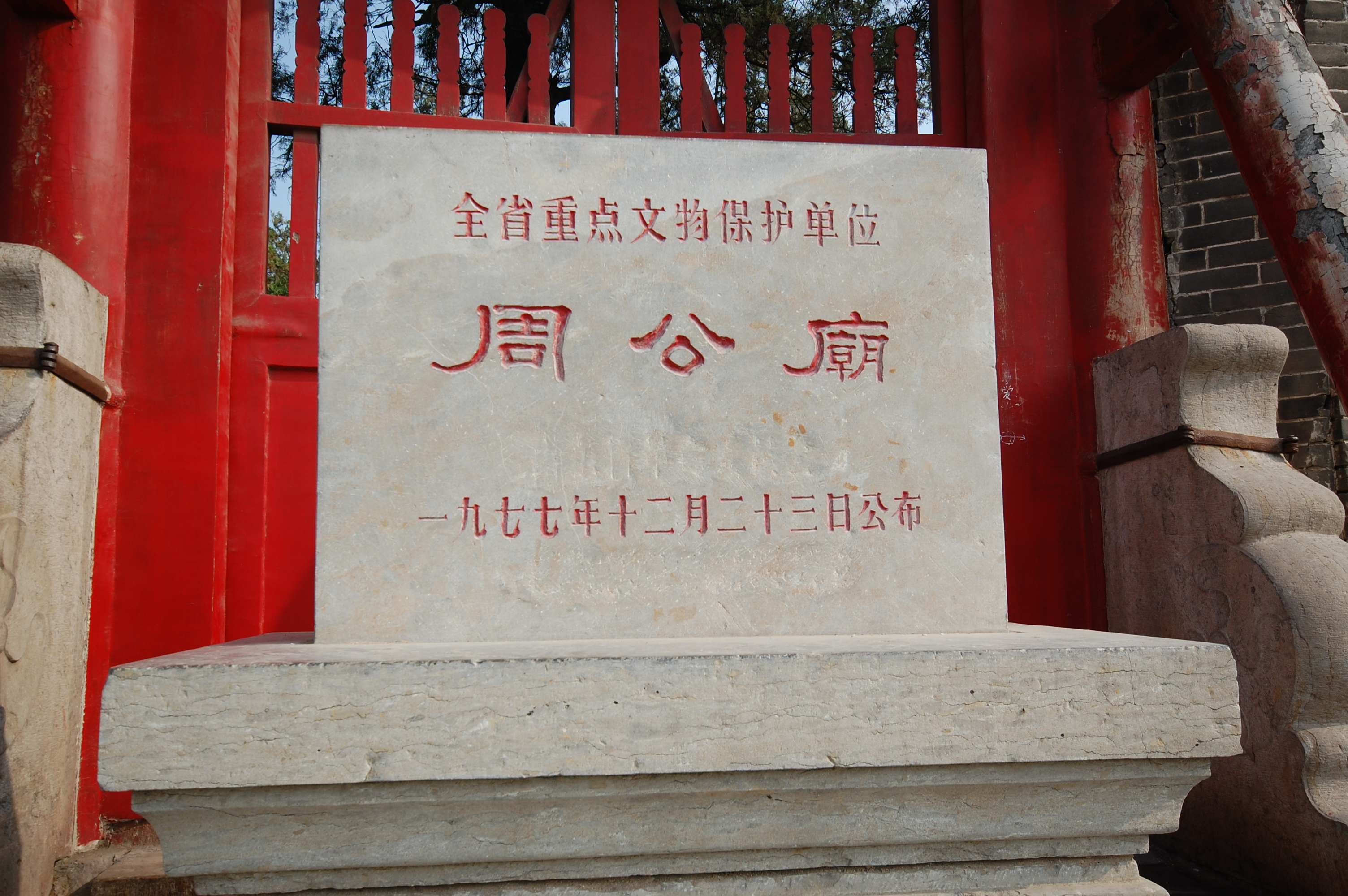
"Cultural Heritage of Shandong Province Duke of Zhou Temple (Zhou gong miao) Listed since December 23rd, 1977" (Sign in front of a Temple in Qufu)

The Major historical and cultural sites protected by Shandong Province (simplified Chinese: 山东省文物保护单位; traditional Chinese: 山東省文物保護單位; pinyin: Shāndōng shěng wénwù bǎohù dānwèi) are recognized on a list compiled by the Office for Cultural Heritage of Shandong Province (pinyin: Shandong sheng wenwu ju). The sites on the list are determined by the provincial government and announced by the State Council of the People's Republic of China .

Three different lists have been drafted in the years 1977, 1992, and 2006. The entire list contains sites that are significant with respect to history, religion, or arts and sciences. Among the sites listed are buildings, tombs, old architecture, temples, and stone inscriptions. Part of the historical and cultural sites protected by Shandong Province are also listed as Major Historical and Cultural Site Protected at the National Level.

== Sites (ordered by Cities and Counties) ==
=== Jinan ===
1. s. 济南市境内的山东省文物保护单位列表

==== Shizhong ====
- Hero Hill Revolutionary Martyrs Cemetery 英雄山革命烈士陵园 (1-05)
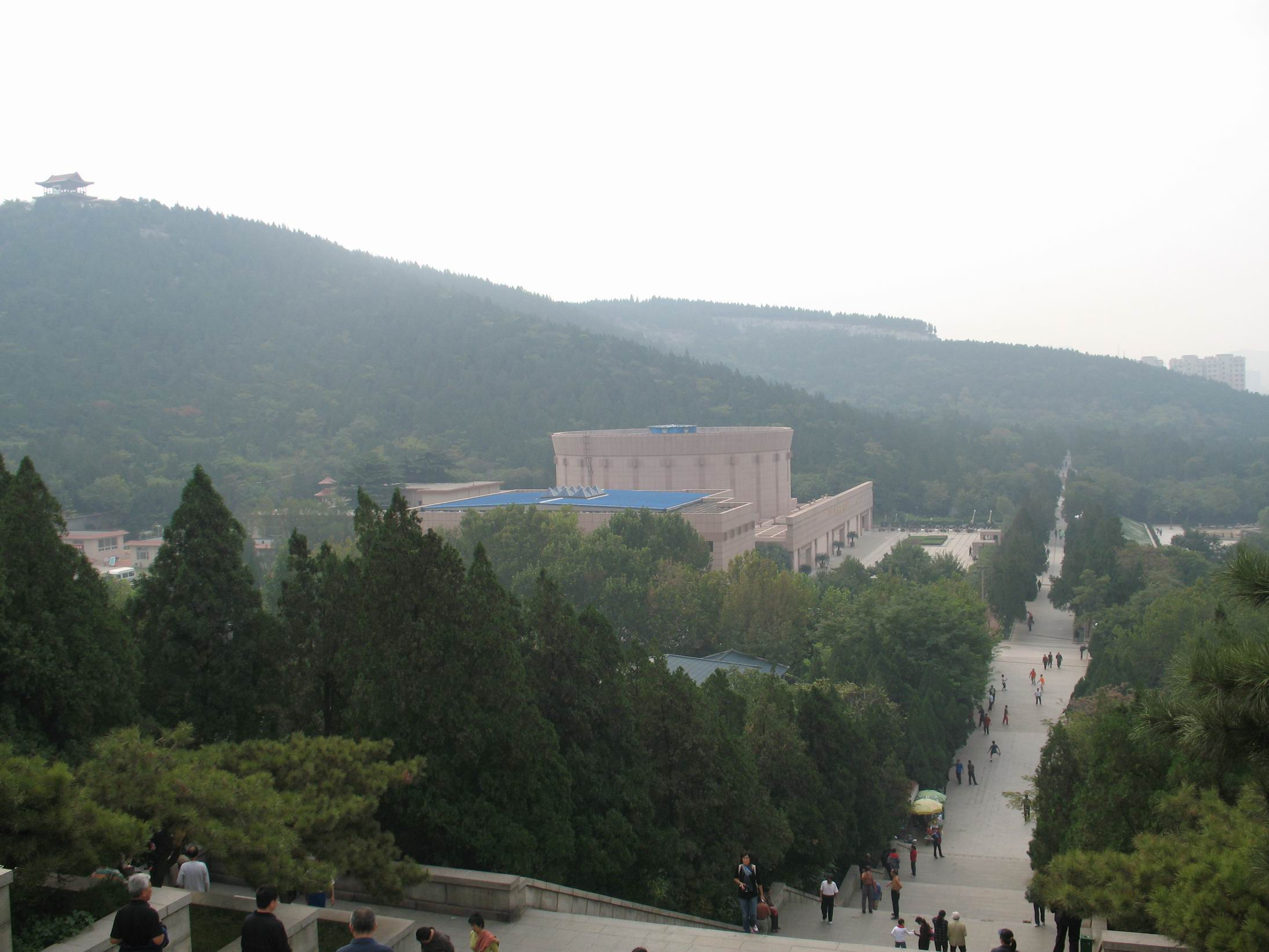
- Shandong shehui zhiyi qingniantuan jiantuan jiuzhi 山东社会主义青年团建团旧址 (2–1)
- Great Southern Mosque 济南南大寺 (2-70)
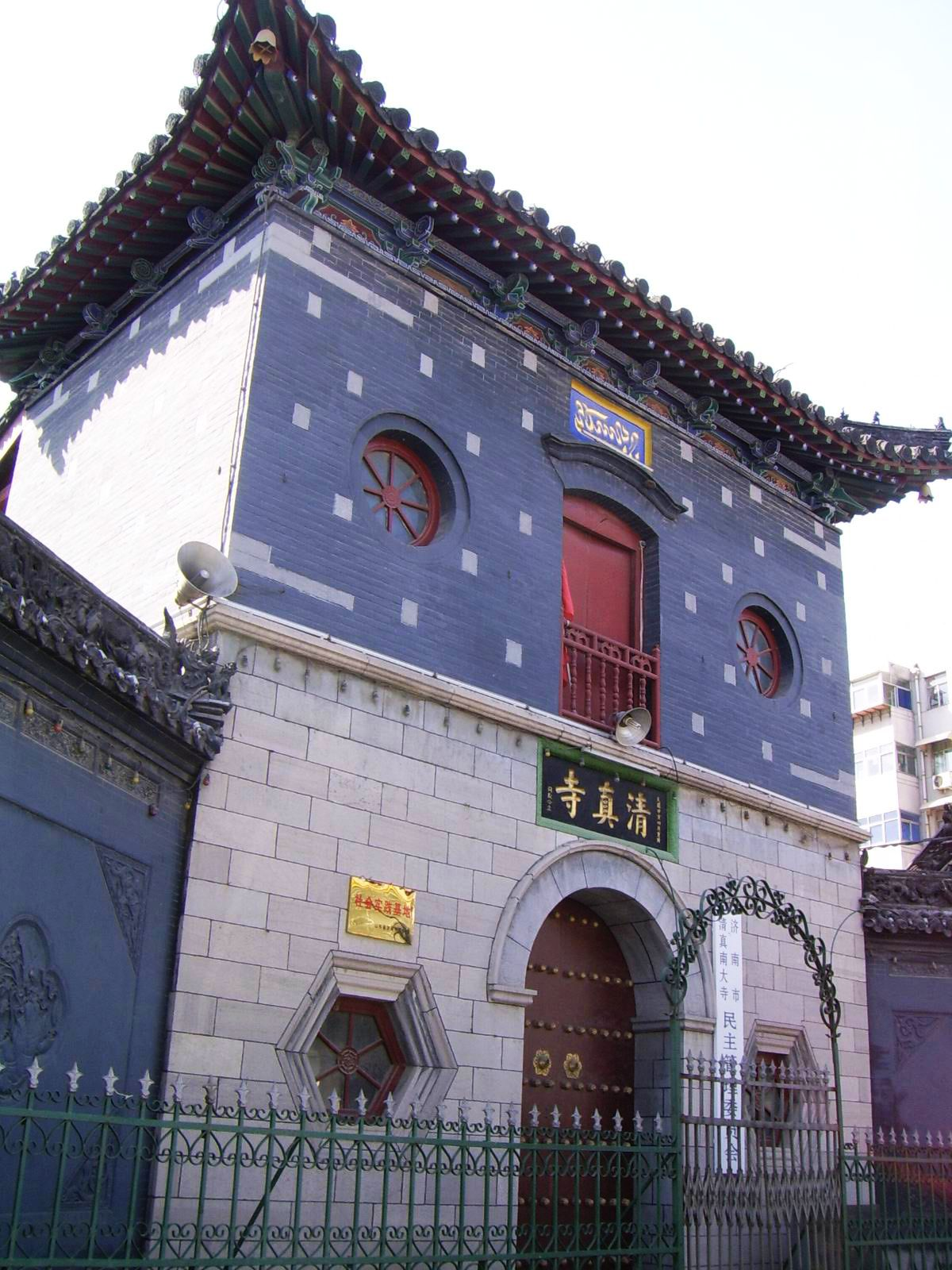
- Ten Thousand Bamboo Garden 万竹园 (2-73)
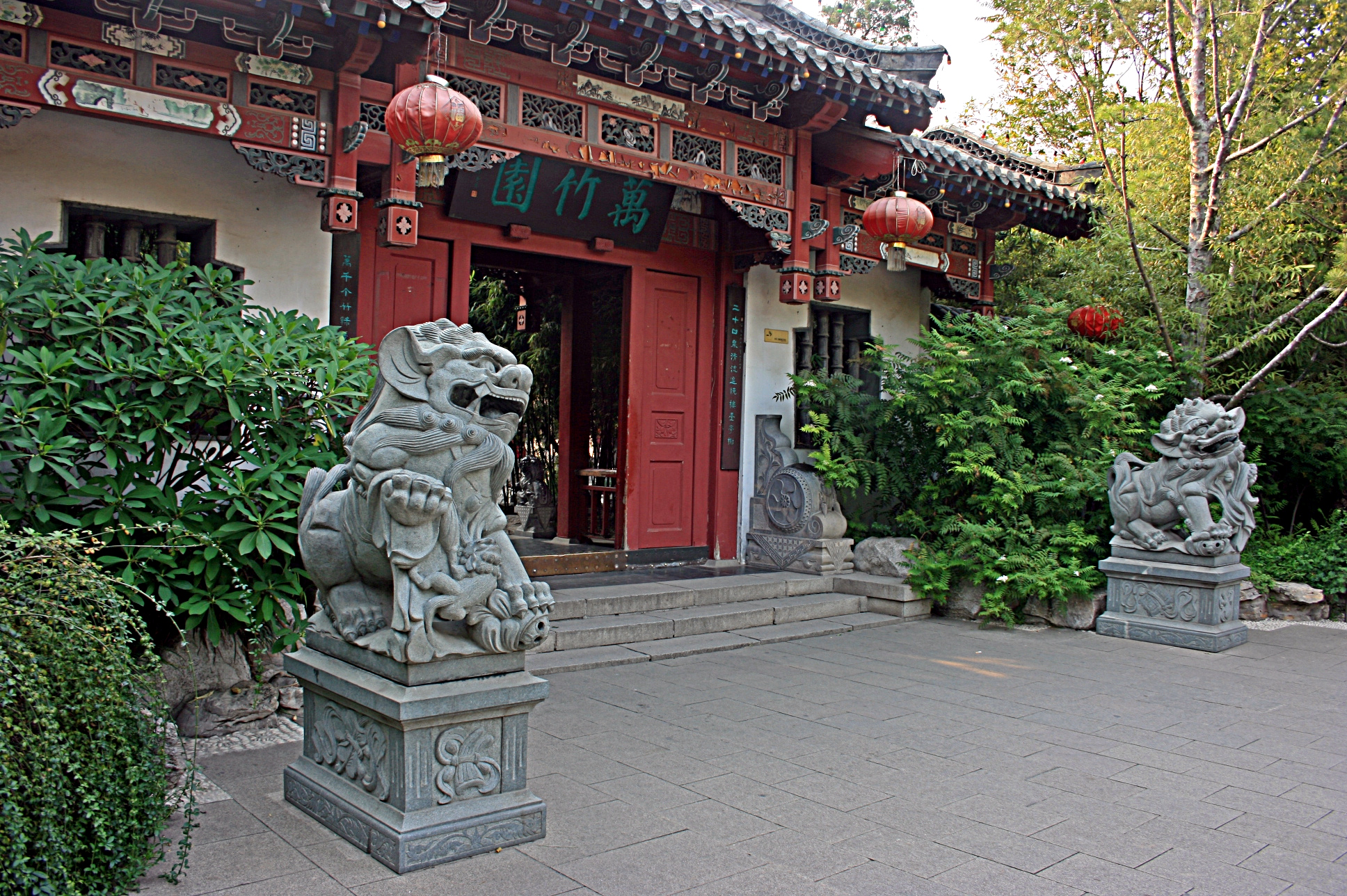
- Jinan Daoyuan 济南道院旧址 (2-74) (Red Swastika Society)
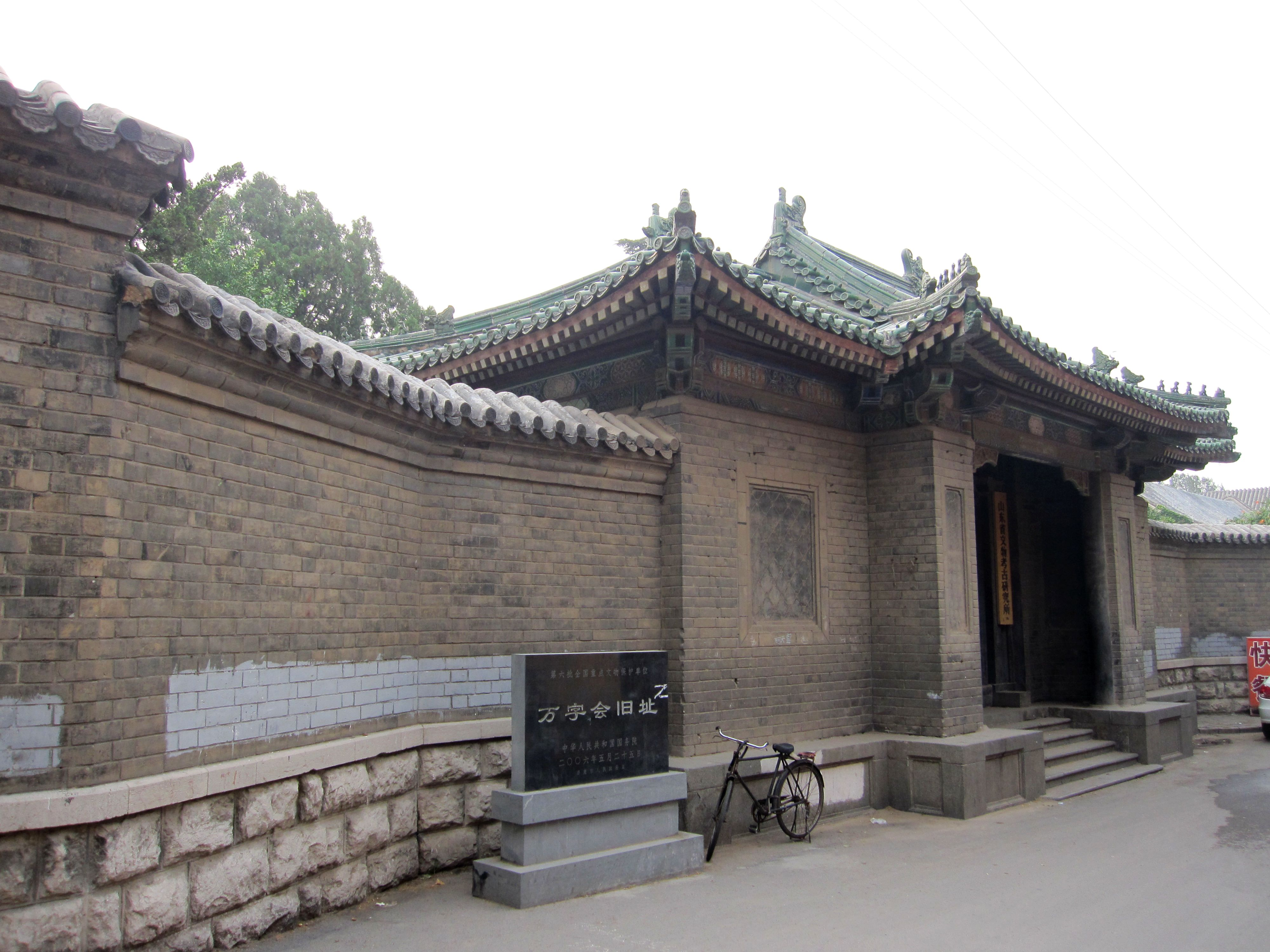
- Tomb of Yin Shidan 殷士儋墓 (3–123) (Yin Shidan)
- Deutsch-Asiatische Bank Jinan Branch Building 德华银行旧址 (3–247)
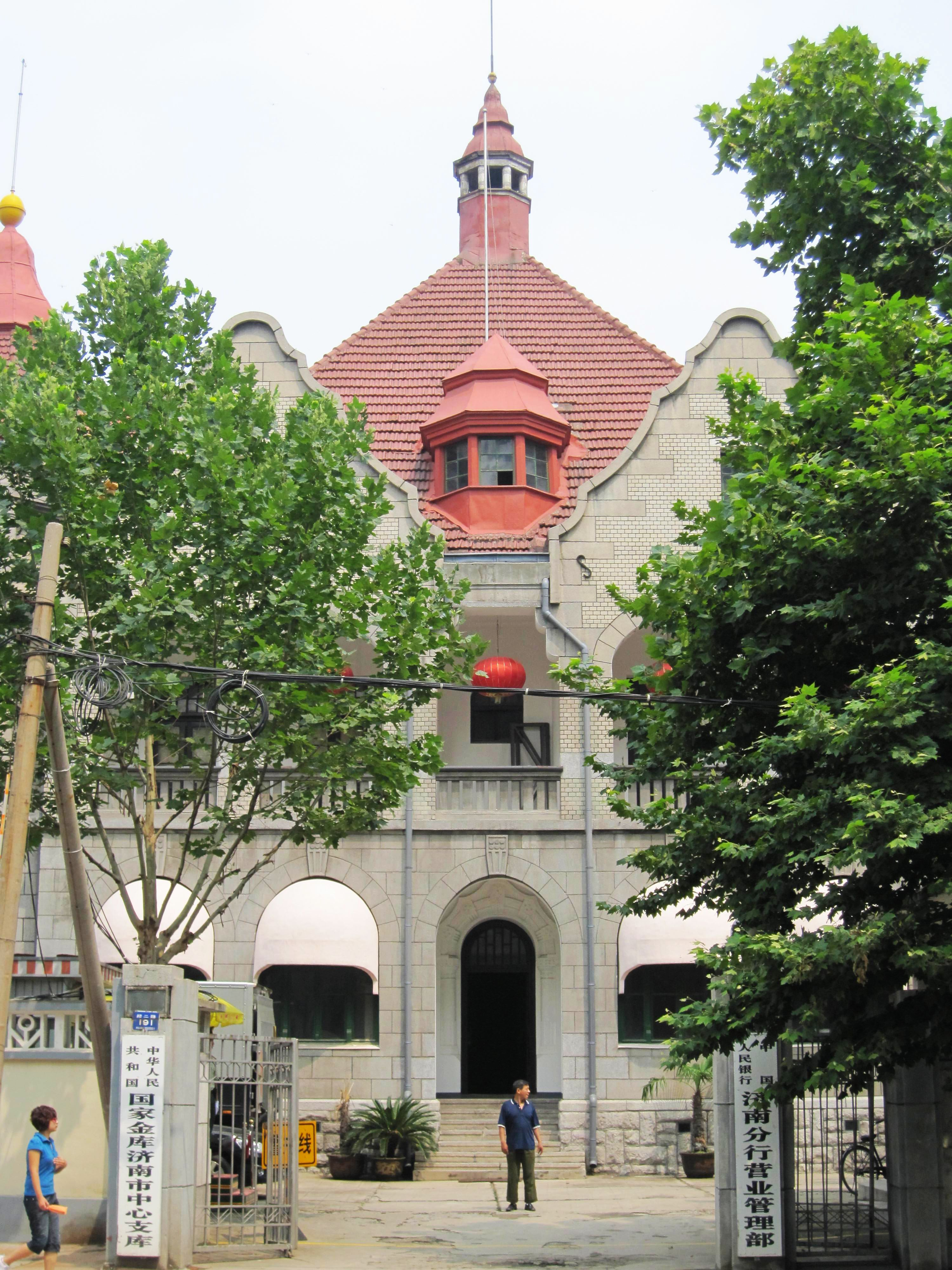
- German Consulate Building “德国领事馆”旧址 (3–248)
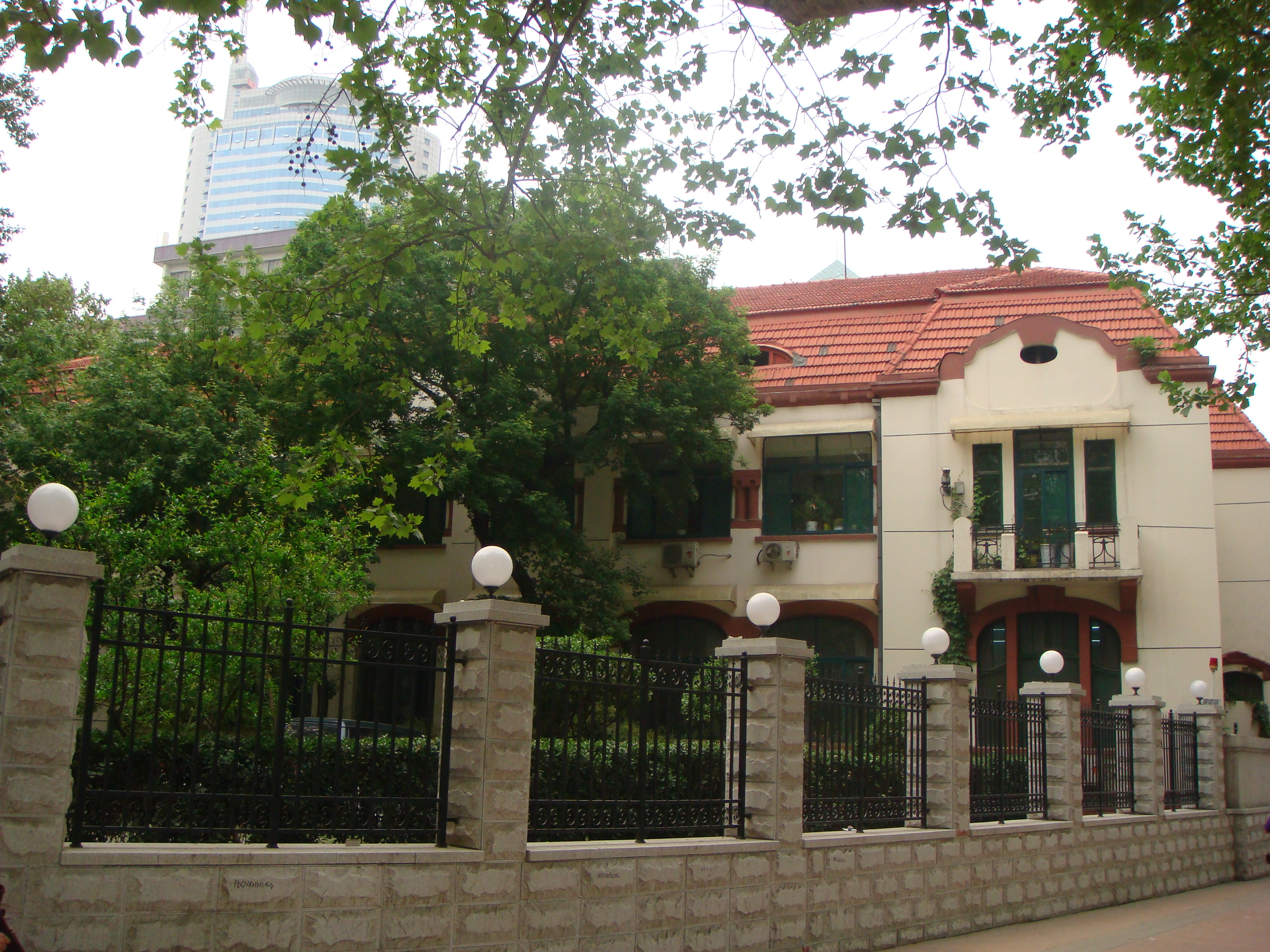
- Shandong youwu guanliju Site 山东邮务管理局旧址 (3–260)
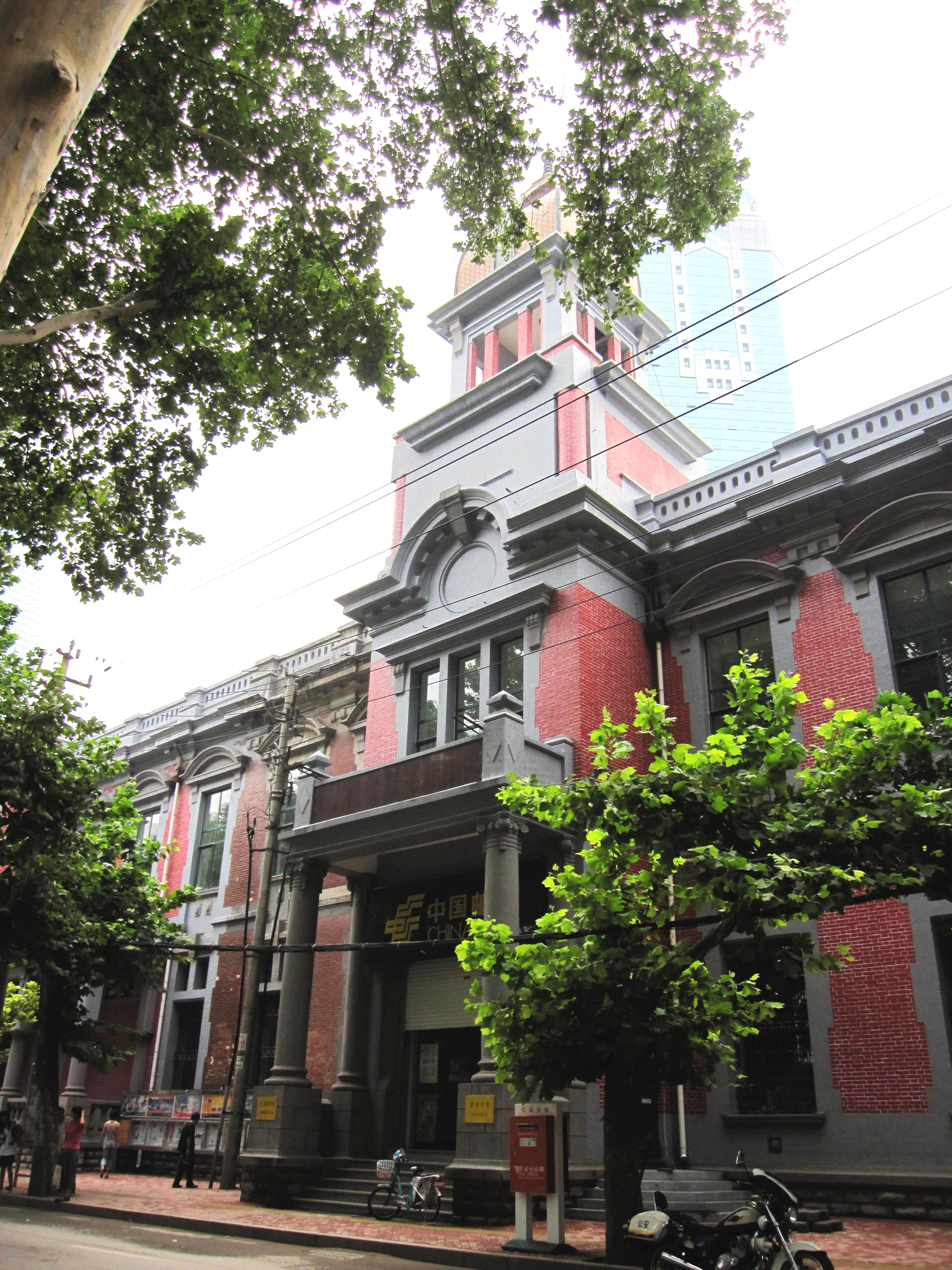
- Wusan can'an Cai Gongshi xunnan di 五三惨案蔡公时殉难地 (Jinan Incident, Cai Gongshi) (3–262)
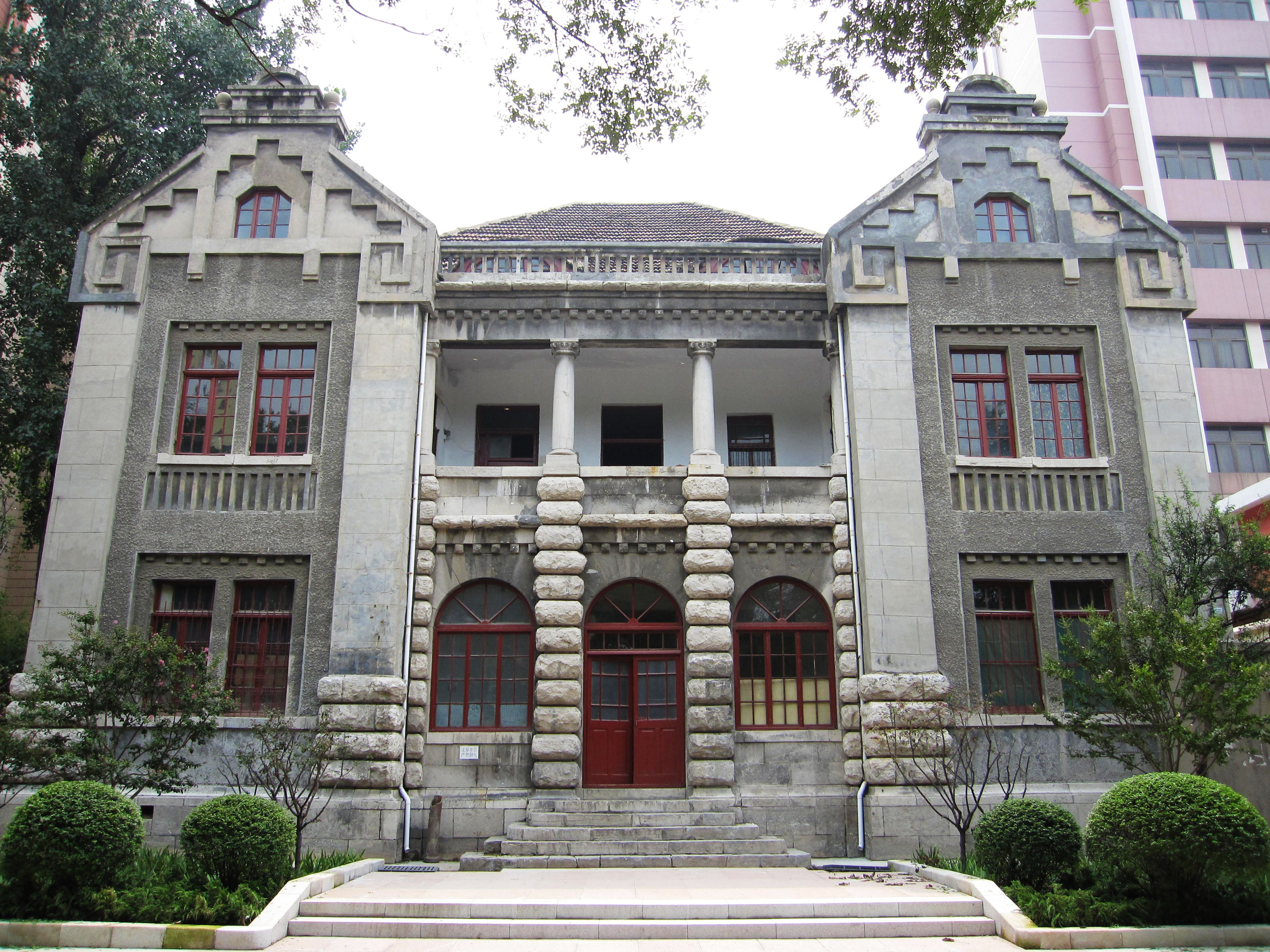
- Jiaotong yinhang Jinan fenhang Site 交通银行济南分行旧址 (3–264)
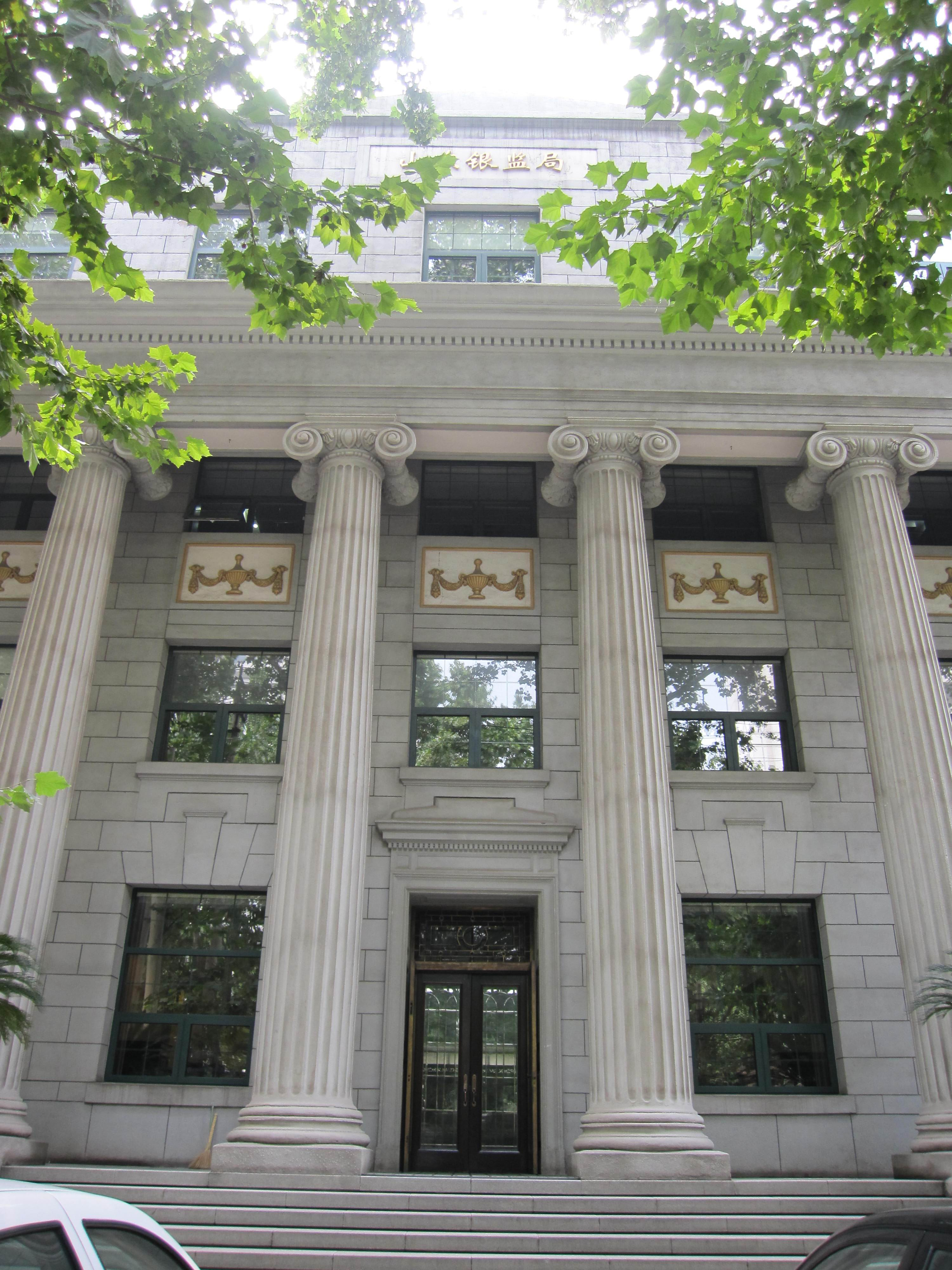

==== Lixia ====
- Liberation Pavilion 解放阁 (1-06)
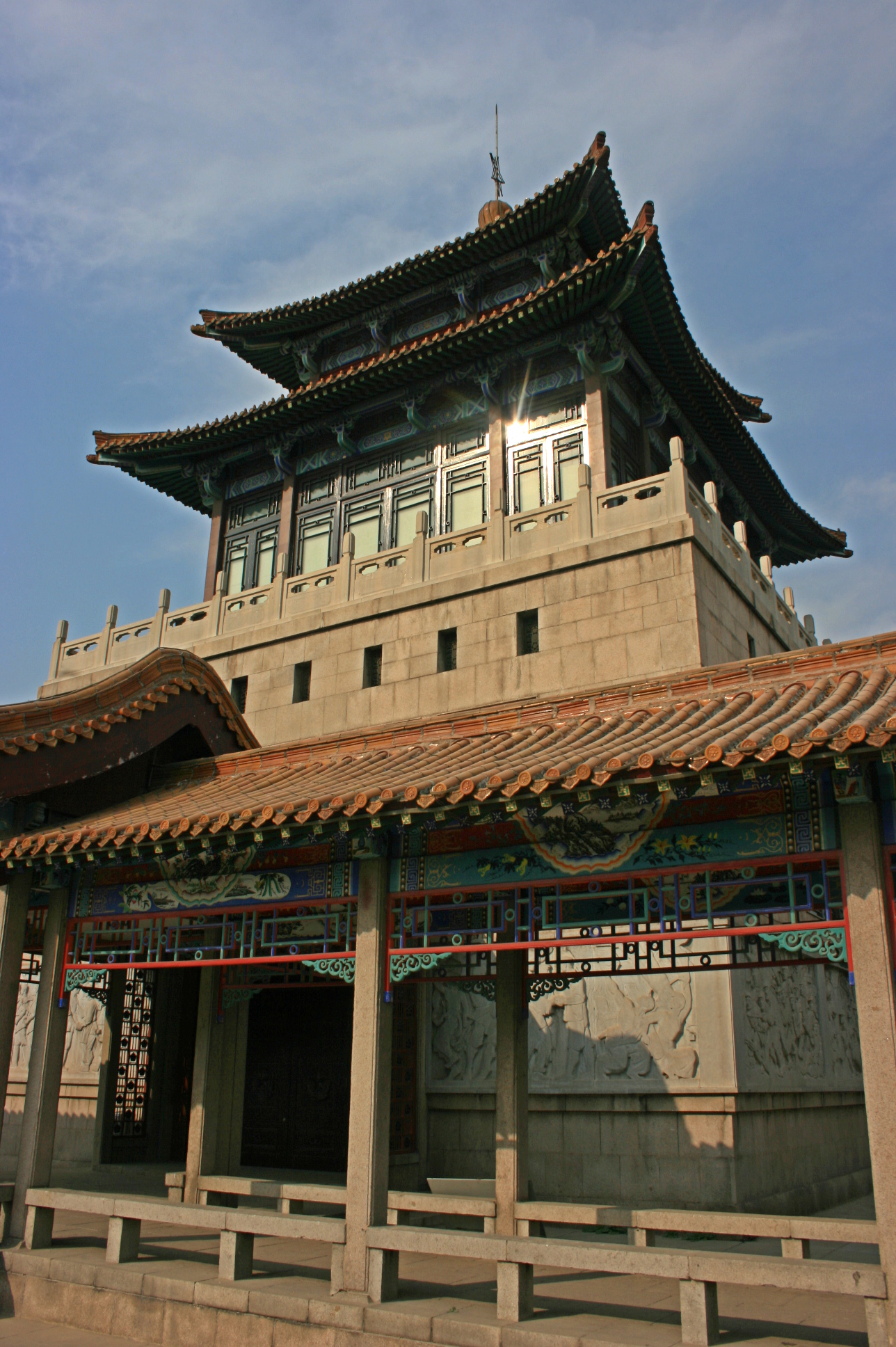
- Cemetery for the martyrs of the Xinhai Revolution 辛亥革命烈士陵园 (2-2) (Xinhai Revolution)
- Dragon Cave, Dongfoyu Cliff Stele Statues 龙洞、东佛峪摩崖石刻造像 (2–16)
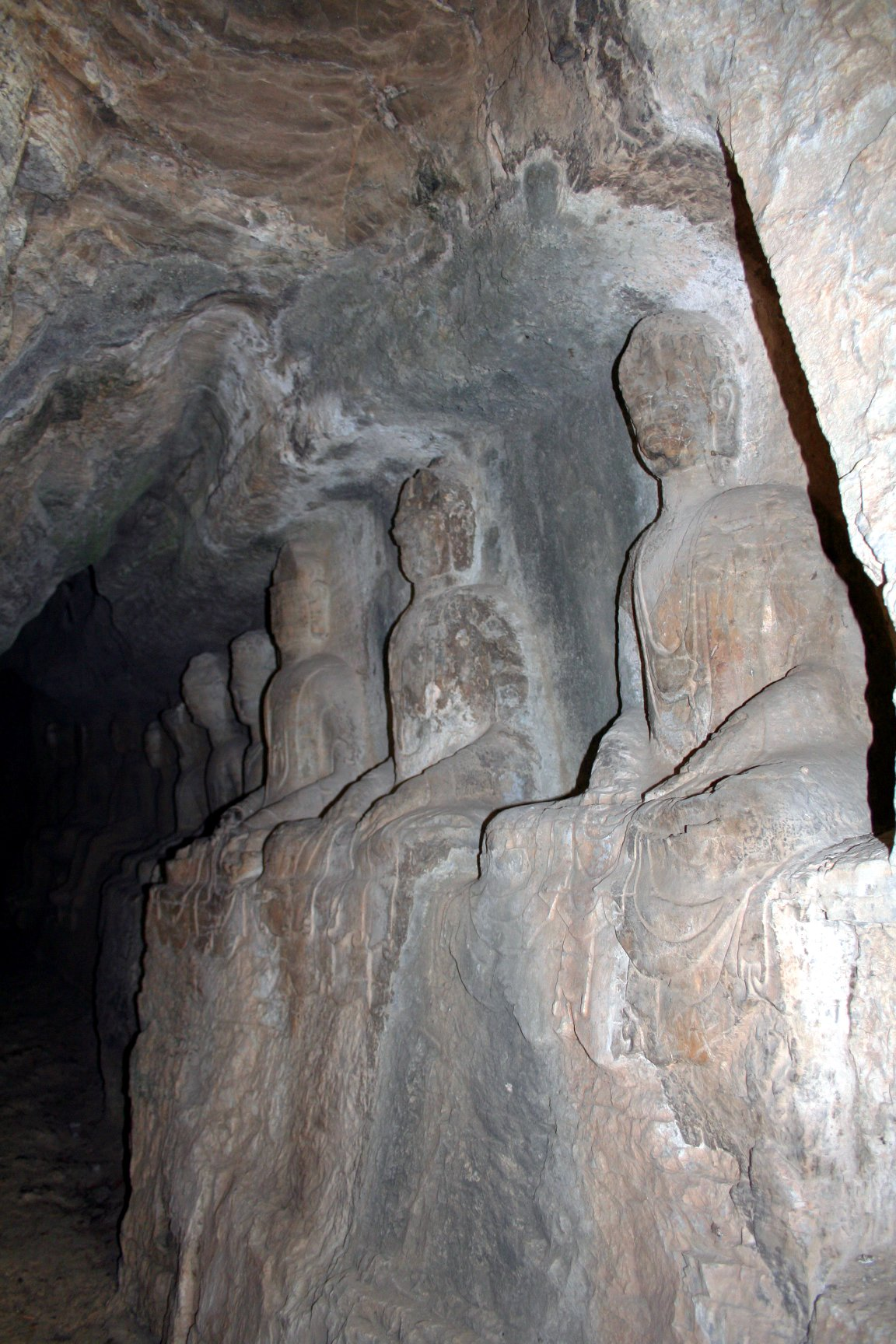
- Fuxue Confucian Temple 济南府学文庙 (2-69)
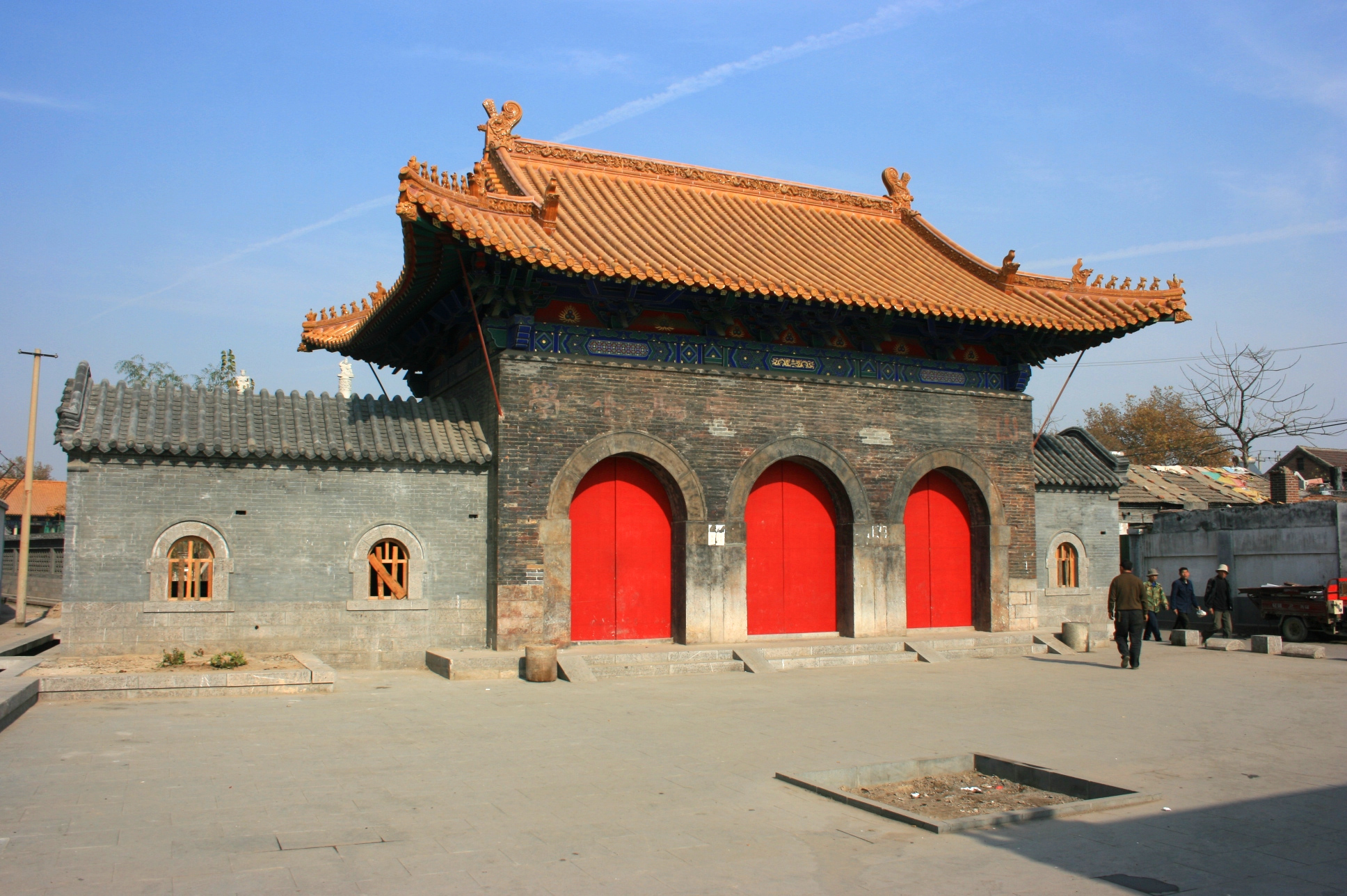
- Sacred Heart Cathedral 洪家楼天主教堂 (2-71)
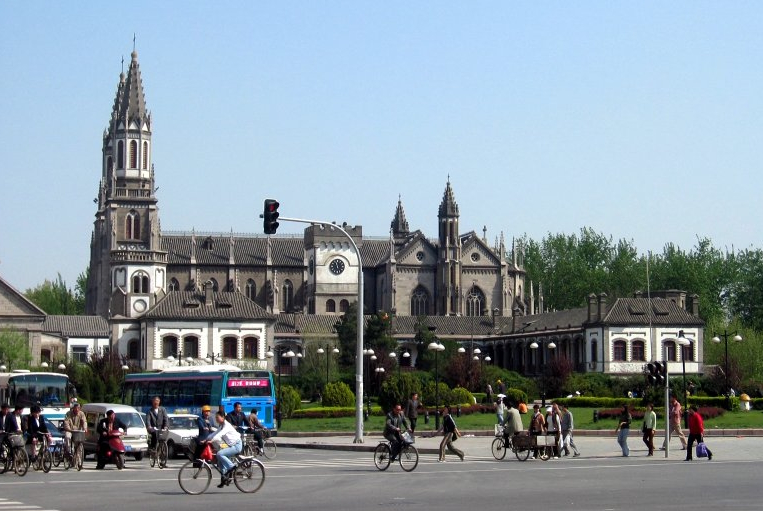
- Guangzhi Yuan 广智院 (2-72)
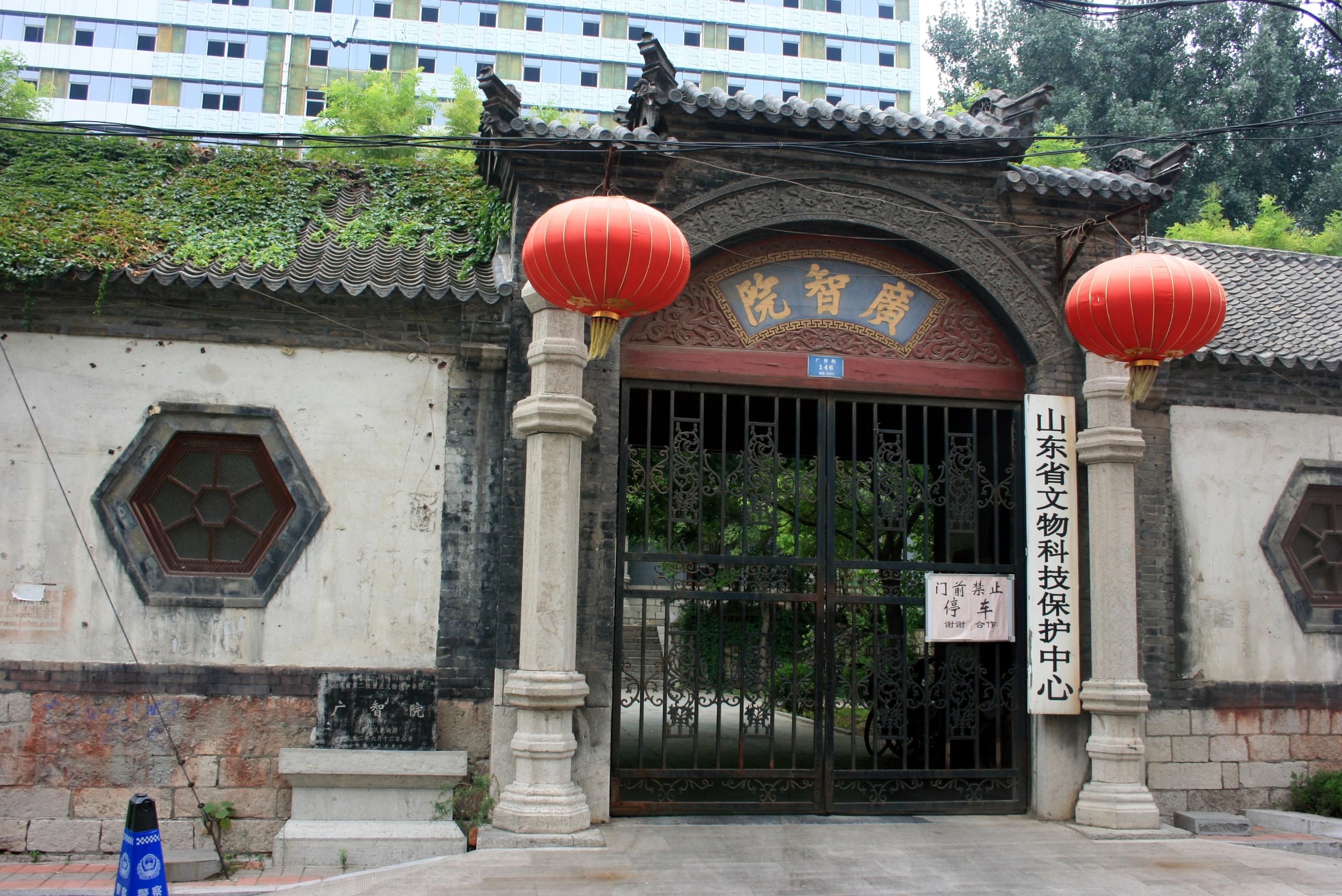
- Tomb of Dao Gui 道贵墓 (2–245)
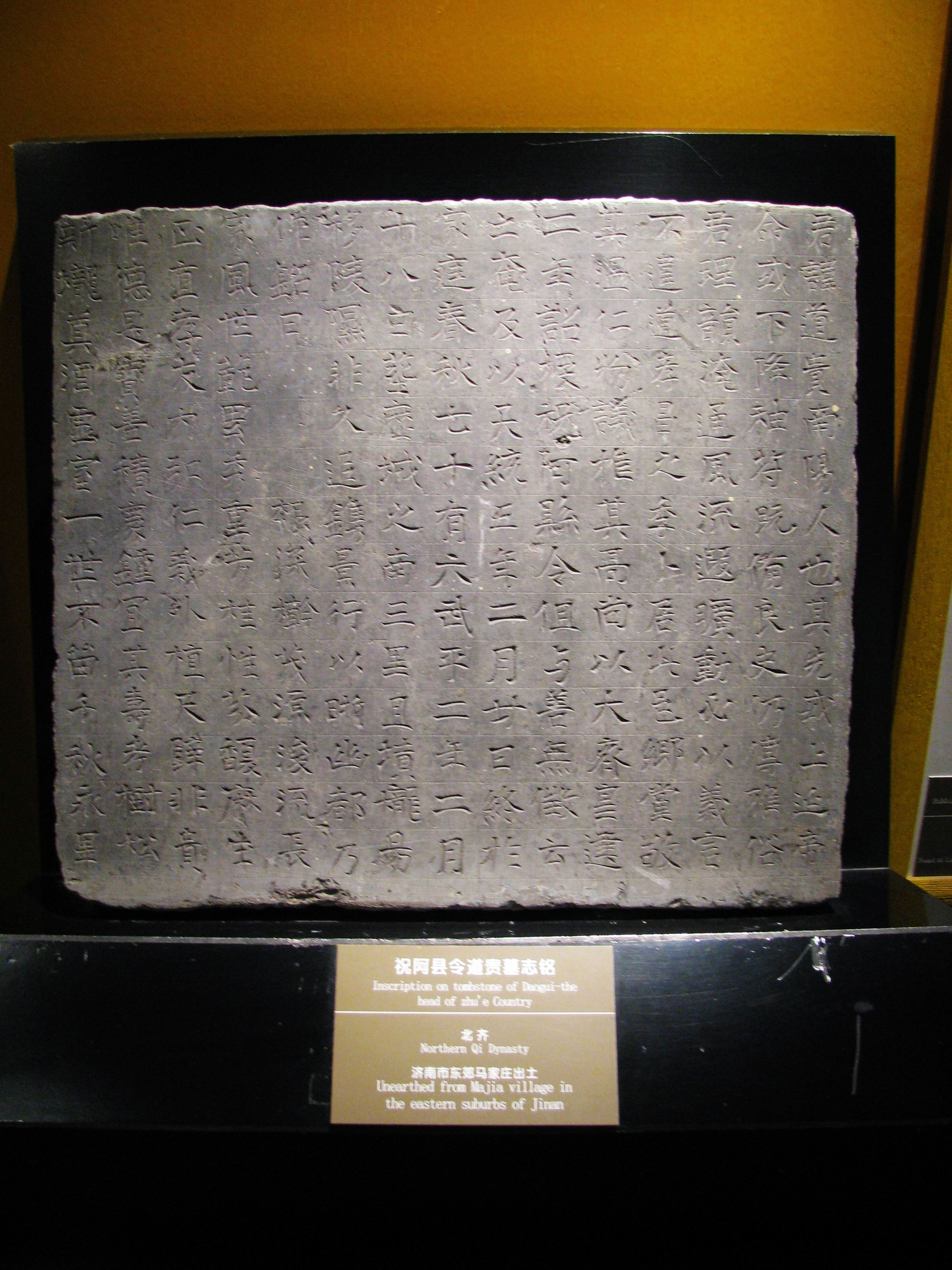
- Daming Lake 大明湖 (3–130)
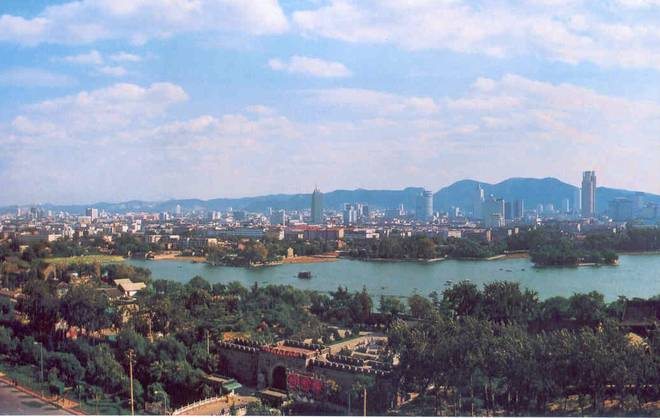
- German buildings of the Huangtai railway station 黄台车站德式建筑群 (3–252)
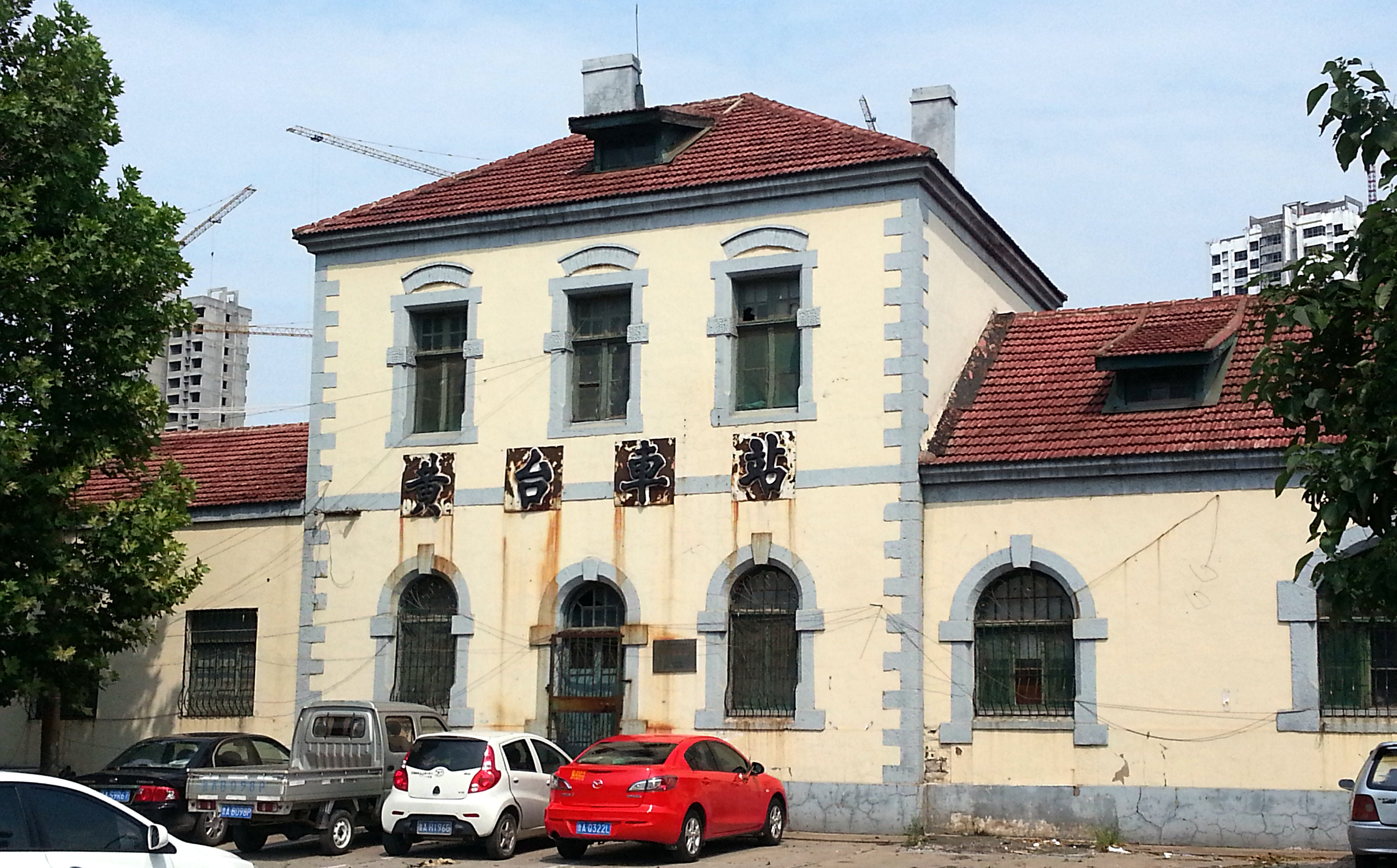
- Qilu University School of Medicine buildings 齐鲁大学含医学院建筑群 (Cheeloo University) (3–259)
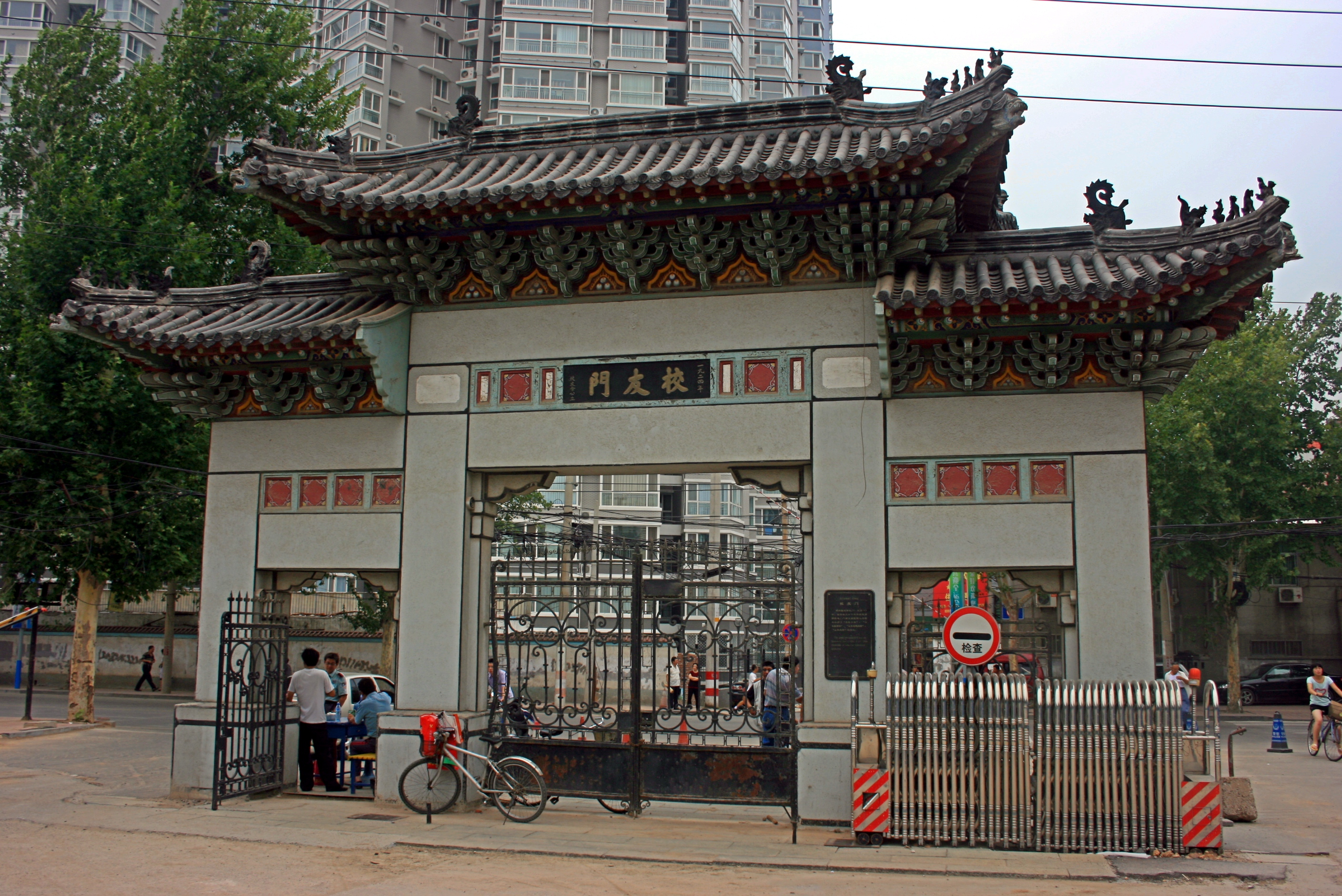
- Kuixu Library 奎虚书藏 (3–269)
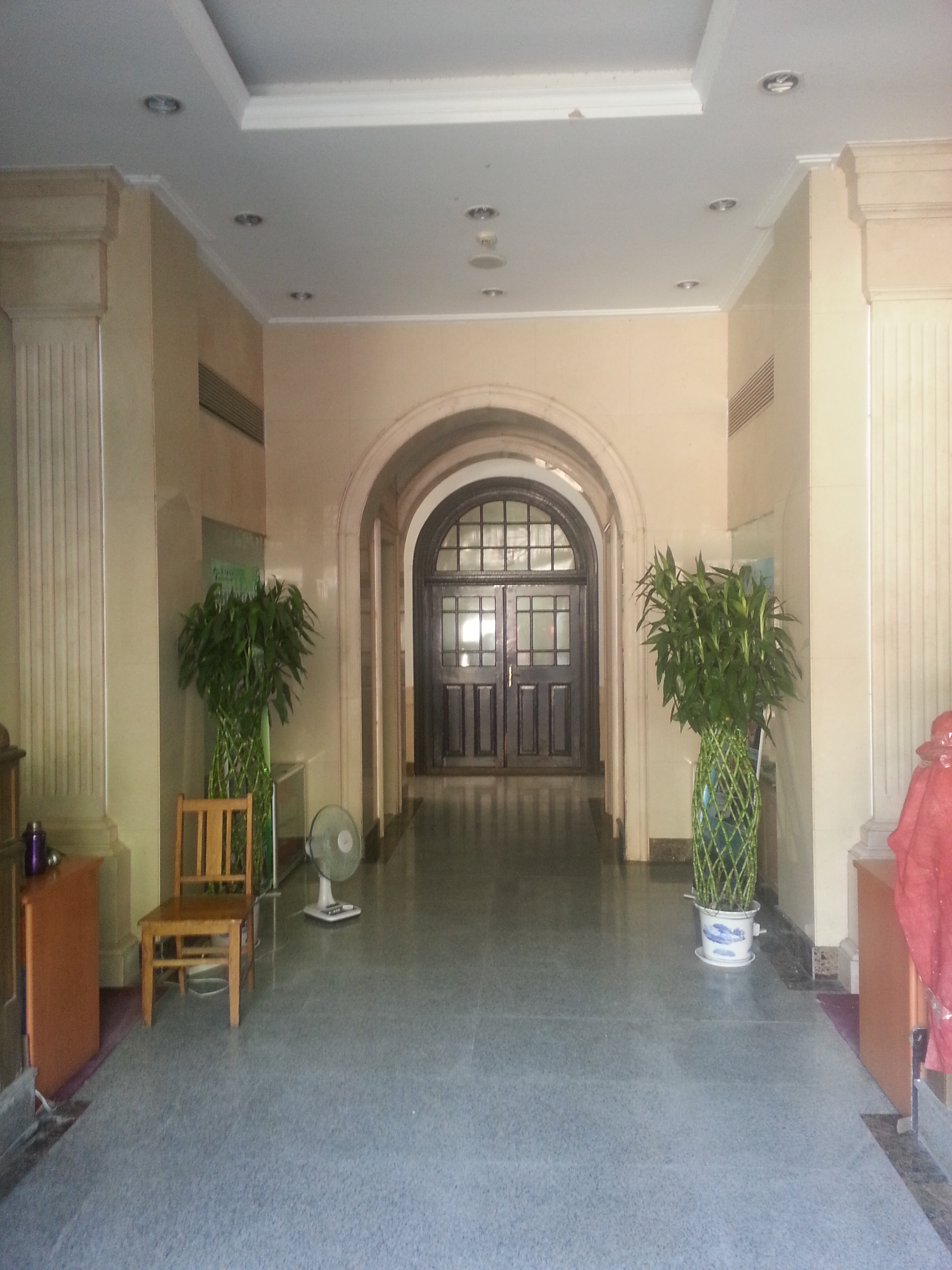
- Former residence of Lao She老舍旧居 (3–271) (Lao She)
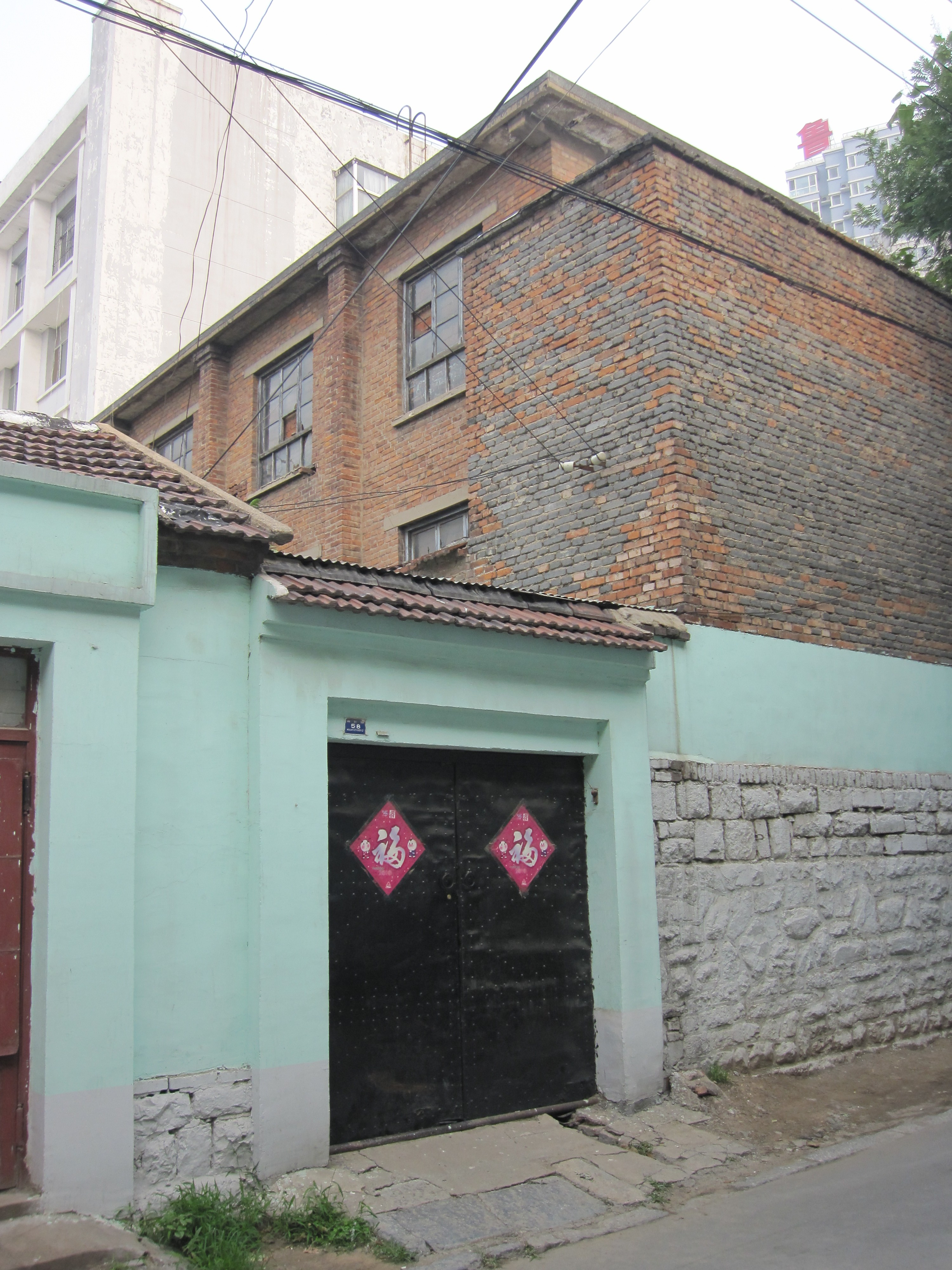

==== Tianqiao District ====
- Memorial for Chairman Mao's inspection of the North Park Commune 毛主席视察北园公社纪念地 (1-01) (Mao Zedong)
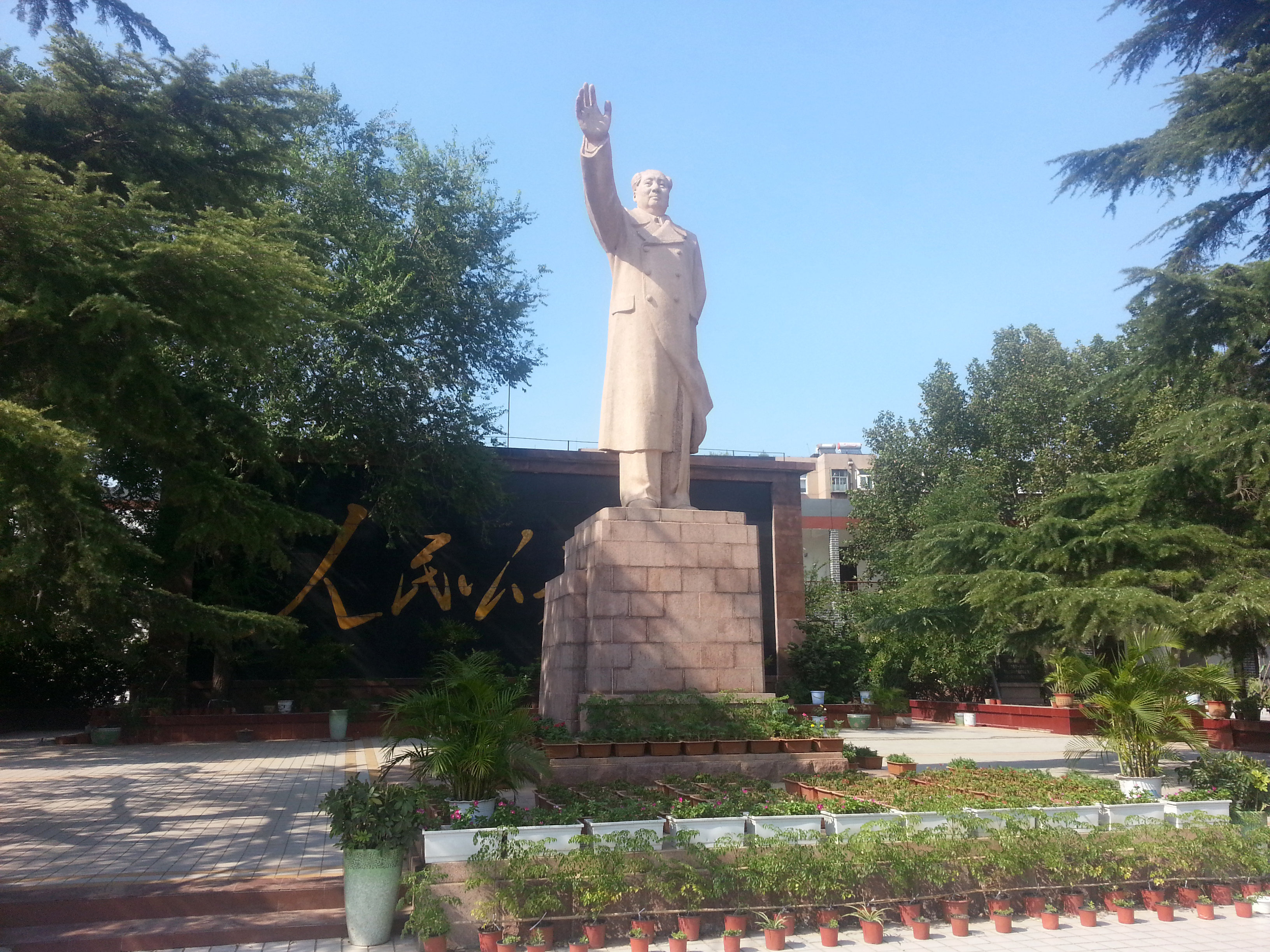
- Memorial for Premier Zhou's inspection of the Loukou Yellow River Railway Bridge 周总理视察泺口黄河铁路桥纪念地 (1-03) (Zhou Enlai)
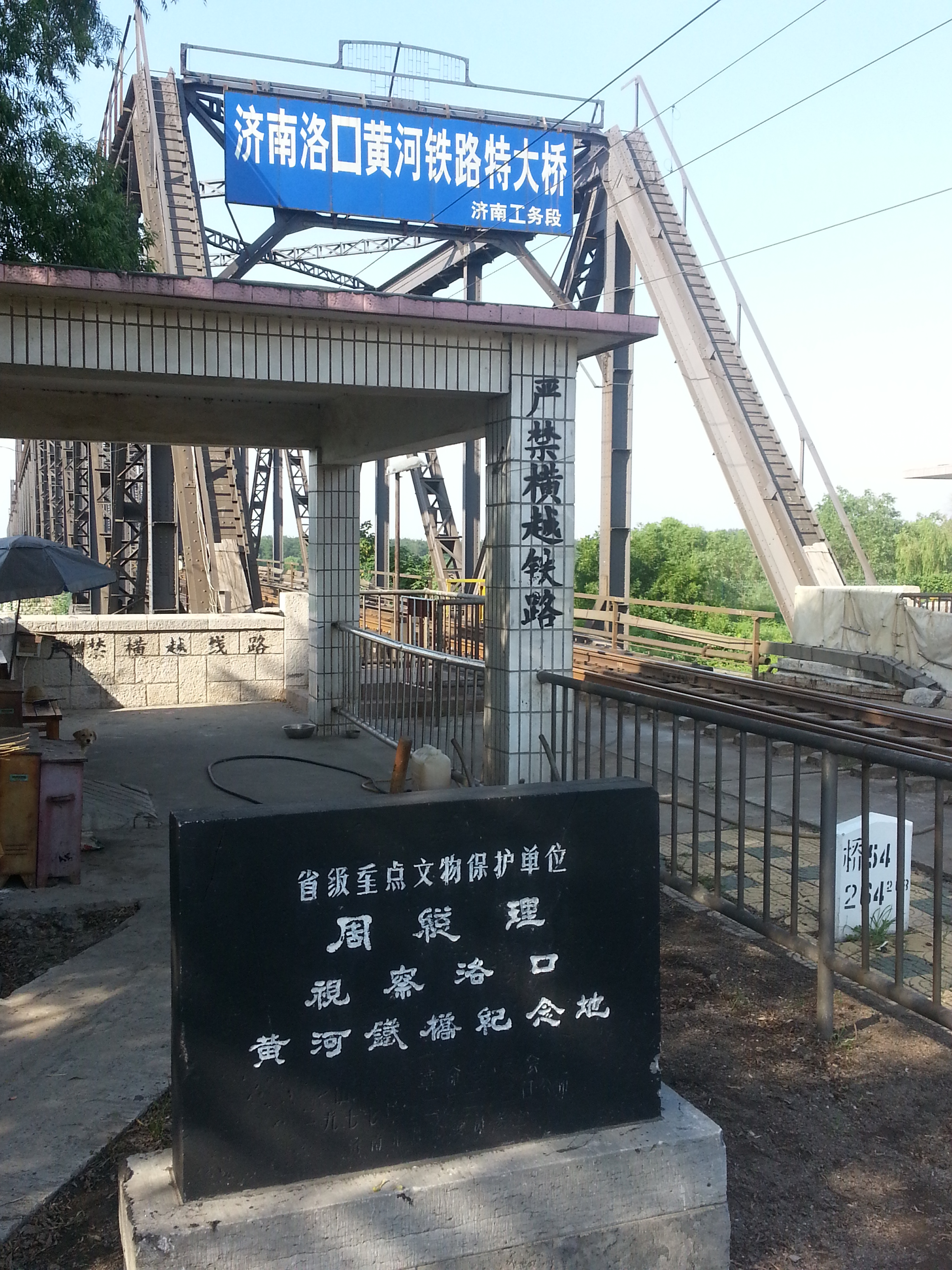
- Site of the CPC Shandong Provincial Committee Secretariat 中共山东省委秘书处旧址 (1-04)
- Tomb of Zhang Yanghao 张养浩墓 (2–246) (Zhang Yanghao)
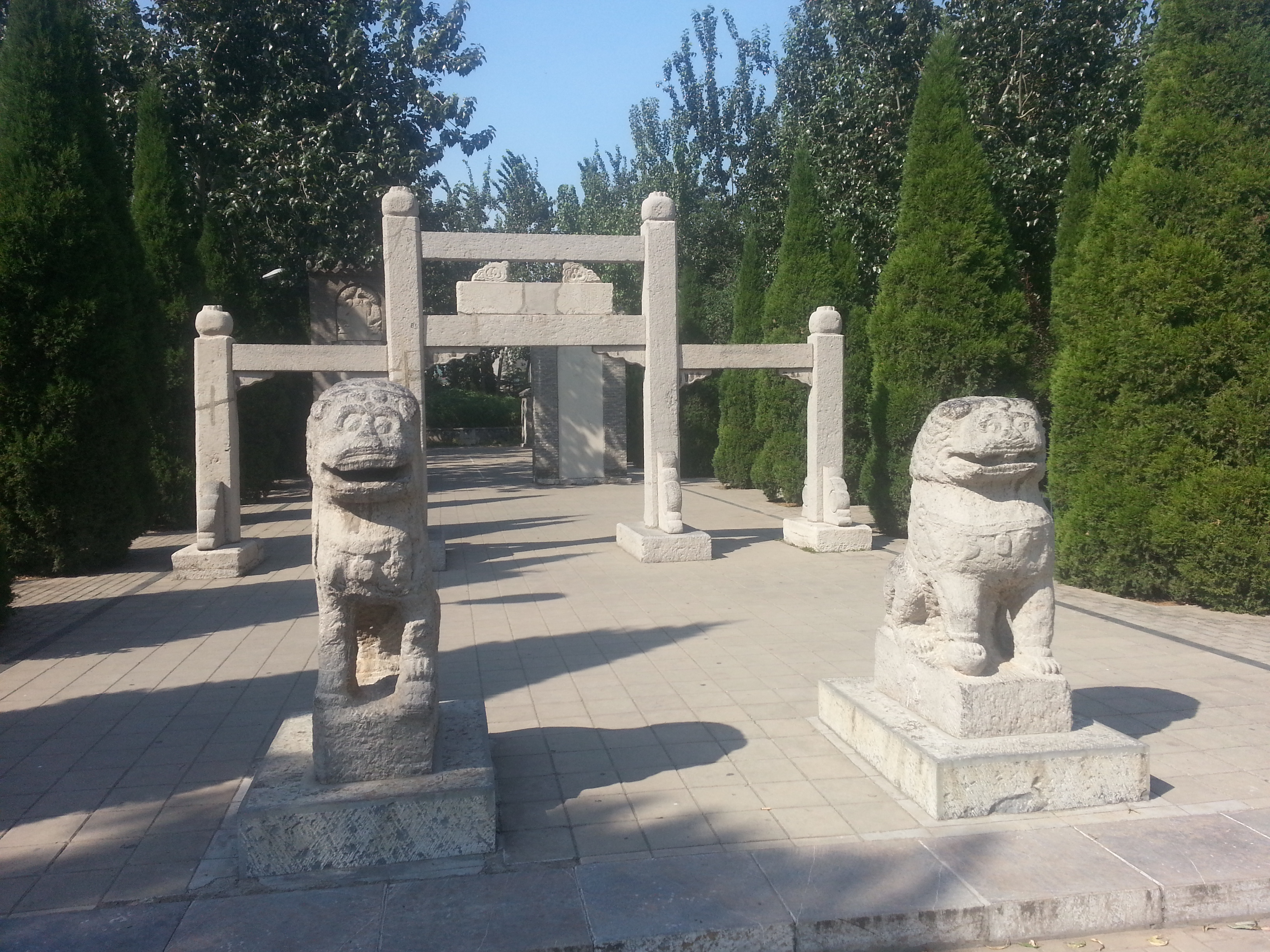
- Jiaoji Railway Station 胶济车站旧址 (3–258) (Qingdao–Jinan Railway)
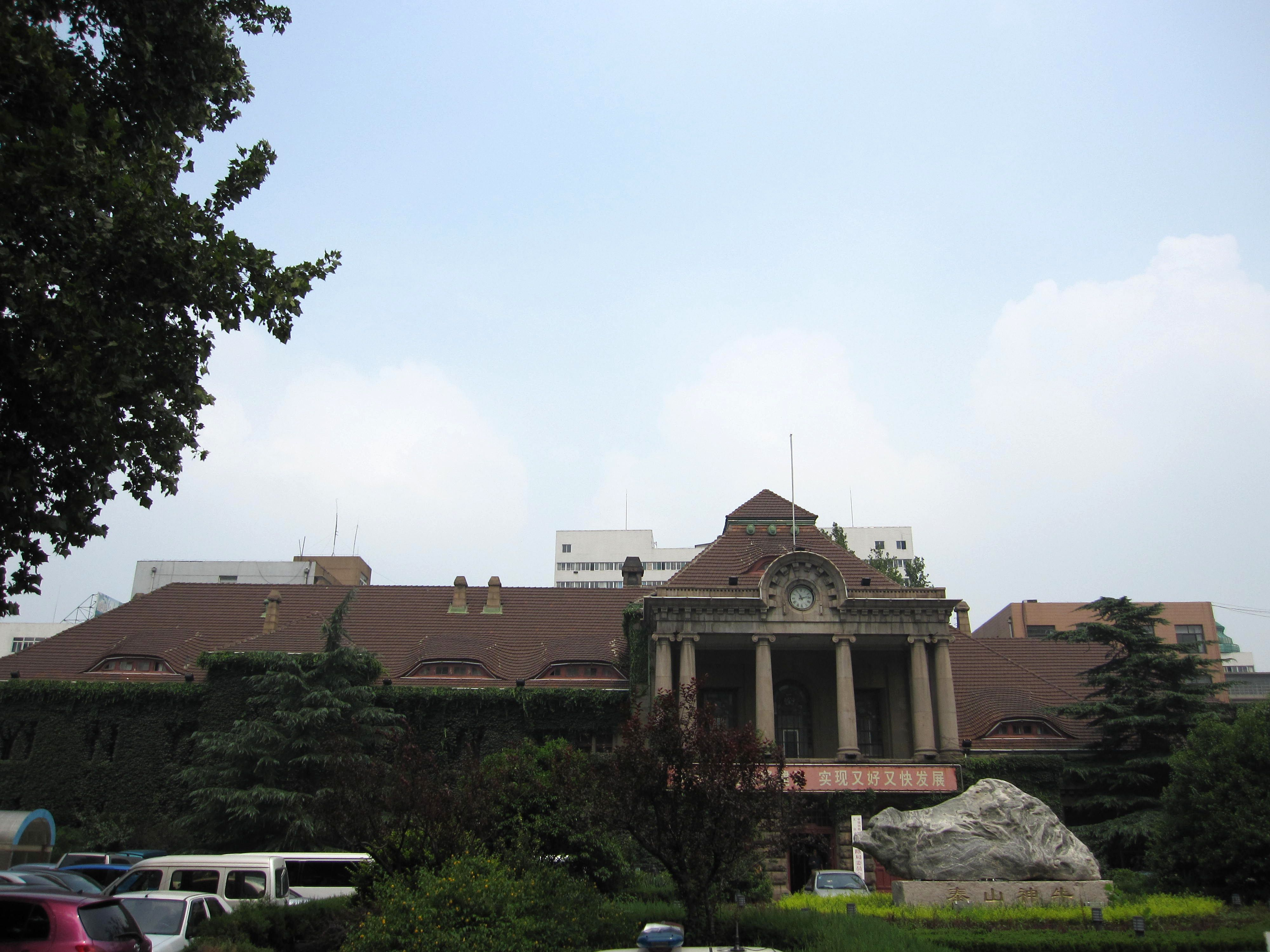
- Tomb of Wang Tongzhao 王统照墓 (3–290)

==== Huaiyin ====
- Xingfu Temple 兴福寺 (3–144)

==== Licheng ====
- Mao zhuxi shicha sheng nong-ke yuan jiniandi 毛主席视察省农科院纪念地 (1-02)
- Dafo Temple Stele Statues 大佛寺石刻造像 (1-30)
- Nine Pinnacle Pagoda 九顶塔 (1-38)
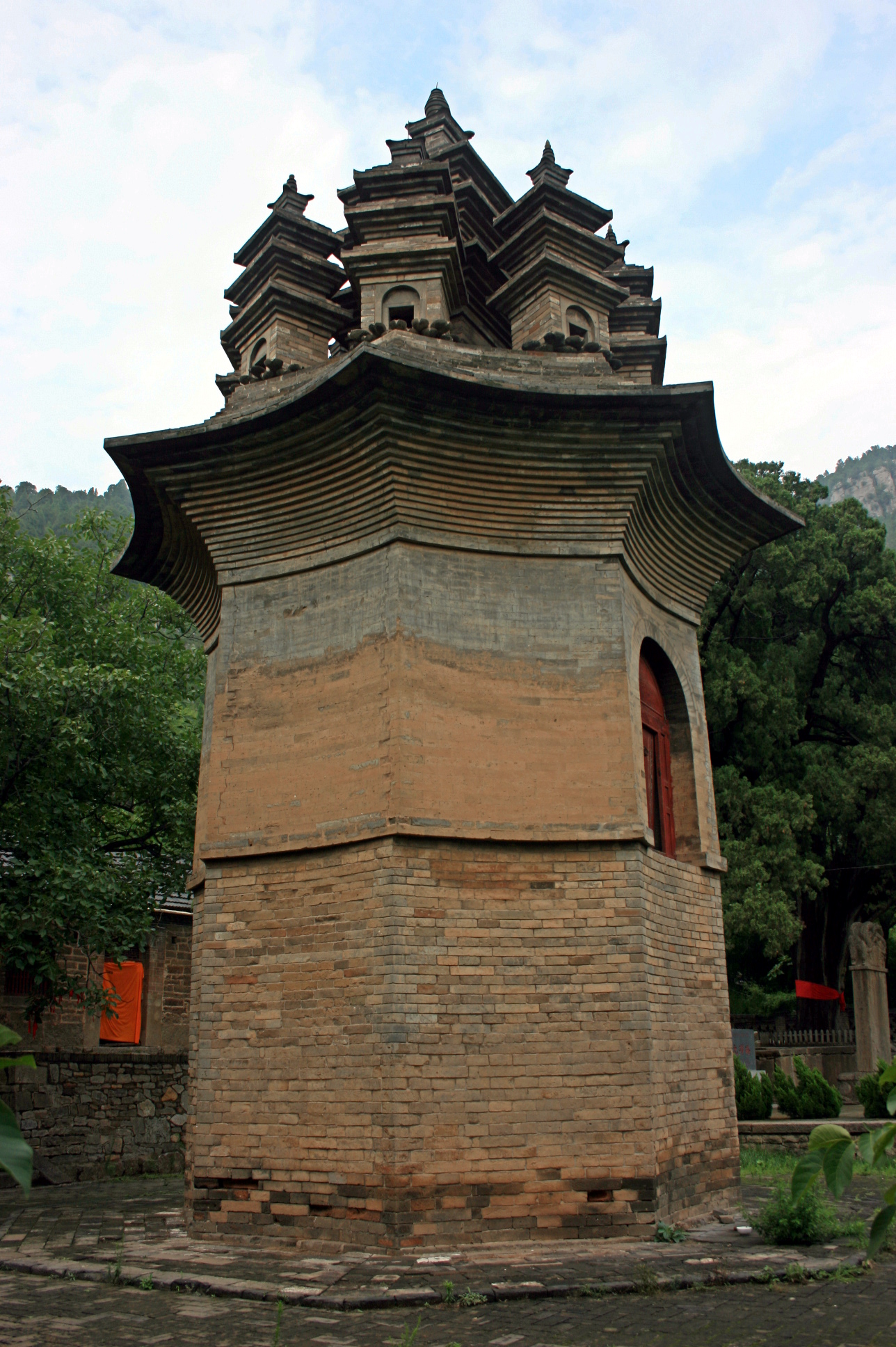
- Dragon-and-Tiger Pagoda 龙虎塔 (1-39)
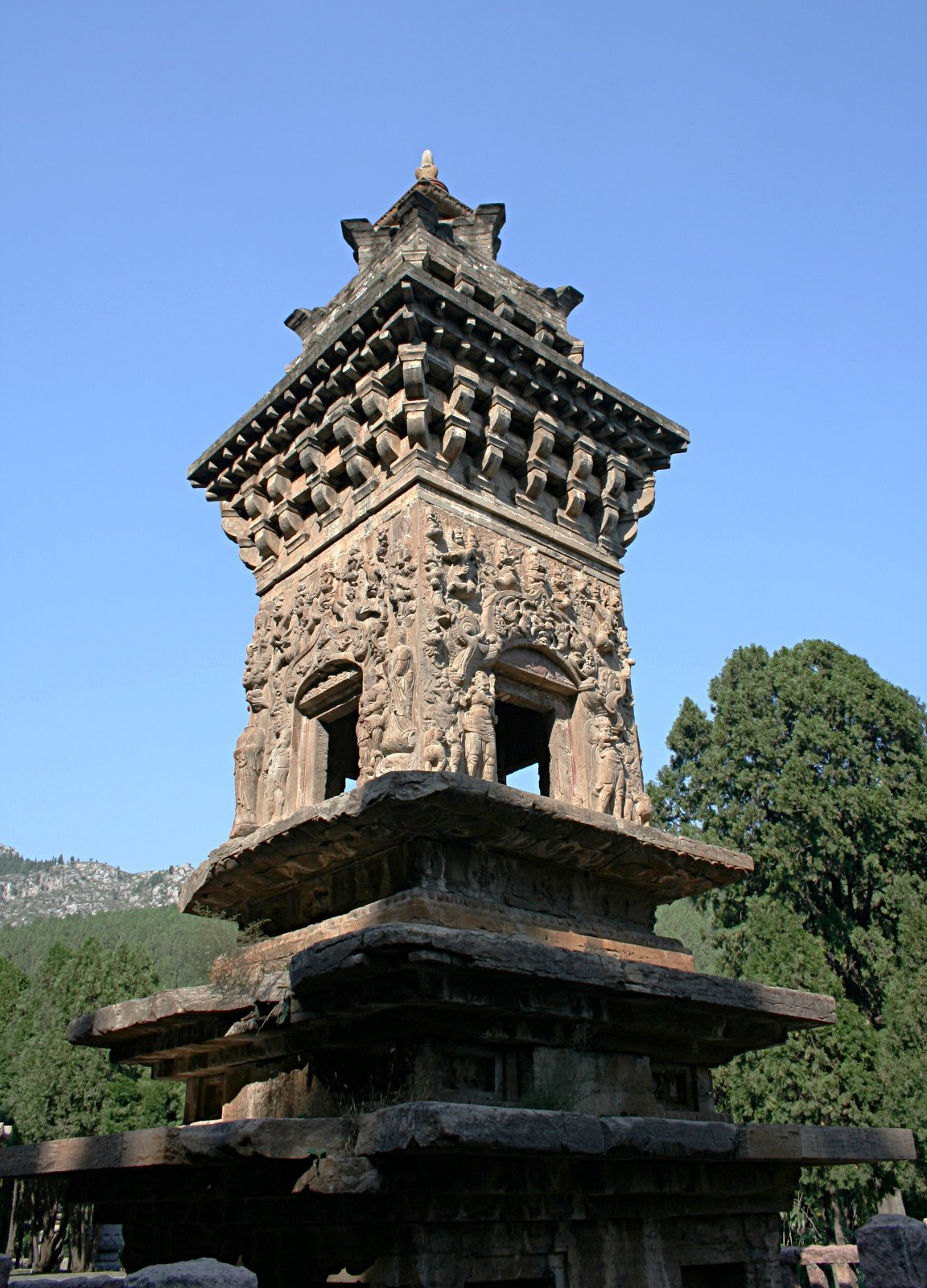
- Daxinzhuang Ruins 大辛庄遗址 (1-64)
- Tomb of Fang Yanqian 房彦谦墓 (1–116) (Fang Yanqian)
- Huayang Palace Old Building Group 华阳宫古建筑群 (3–222)
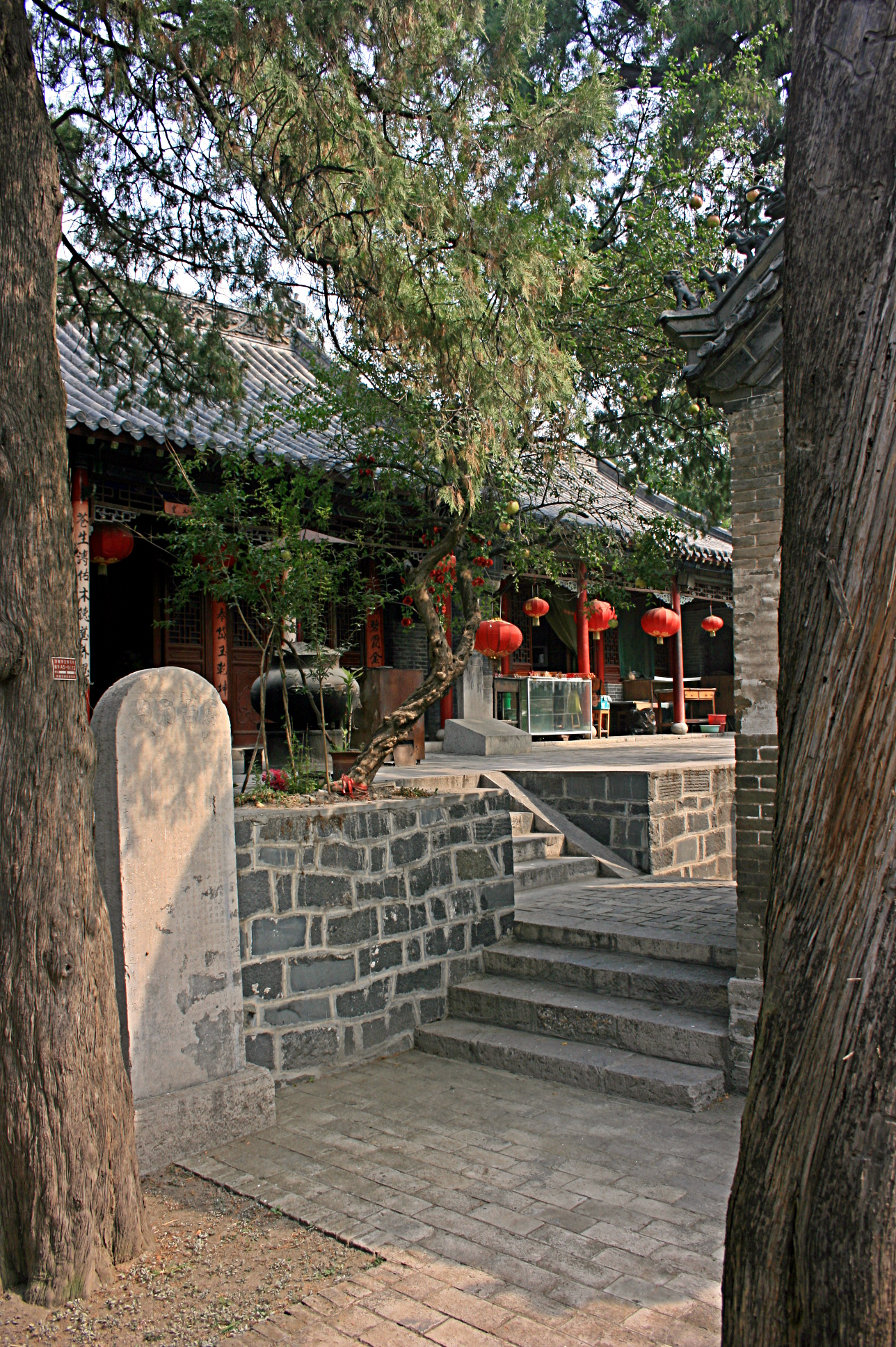

==== Changqing ====
- Lingyan Temple Thousand Buddha Hall Luohan Sculptures 灵岩寺千佛殿罗汉塑 (1-40)
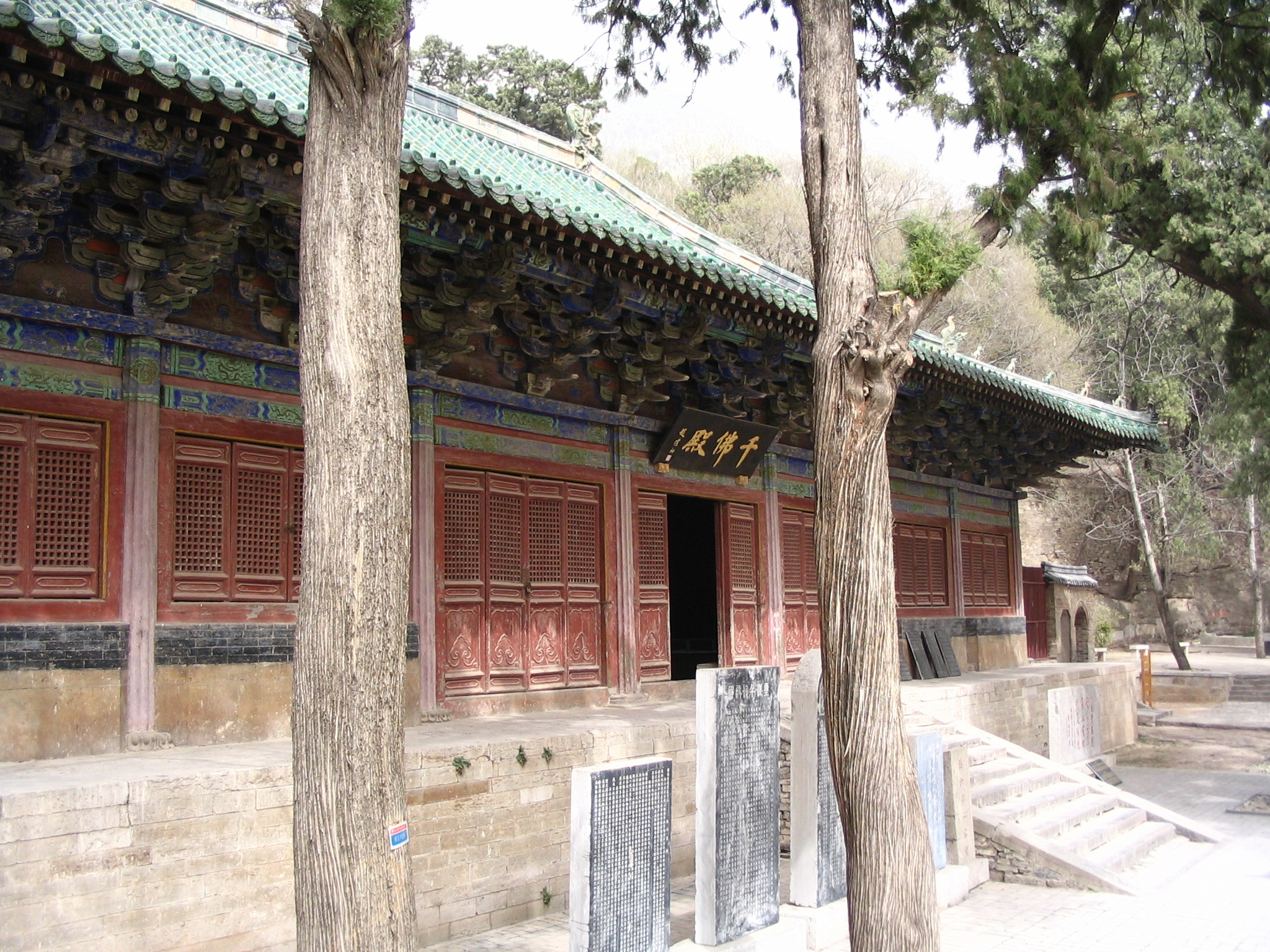
- Xiao Village Ruins 小屯遗址 (1-68)
- Lianhua Cave Grotto Statues 莲花洞石窟造像 (2–17)
- Zhangguan Ruins 张官遗址 (2-90)
- Daliuhang Ruins 大柳杭遗址 (2–110)
- Yuezhuang Ruins 月庄遗址 (3–1)
- Mingde Royal Tombs 明德王墓群 (3–122)
- Shifo Hall 石佛堂 (3–133)
- Mount Wufeng Cave zhenguan 五峰山洞真观 (3–149)

==== Zhangqiu ====
- Dongpingling Old City 东平陵故城 (1-72)
- Jiaojia Ruins 焦家遗址 (2–109)
- Wangtuiguan Ruins 王推官遗址 (2–144)
- Tomb of Li Kaixian 李开先墓 (2–250)
- Xihe Ruins 西河遗址 (2-88)
- Xiaojingshan Ruins 小荆山遗址 (2-89)
- Wangguan Ruins 王官遗址 (2-92)
- Xingguo Temple 兴国寺 (3–152)

==== Pingyin ====
- Cuipingshan Duofo Pagoda 翠屏山多佛塔 (1-43)
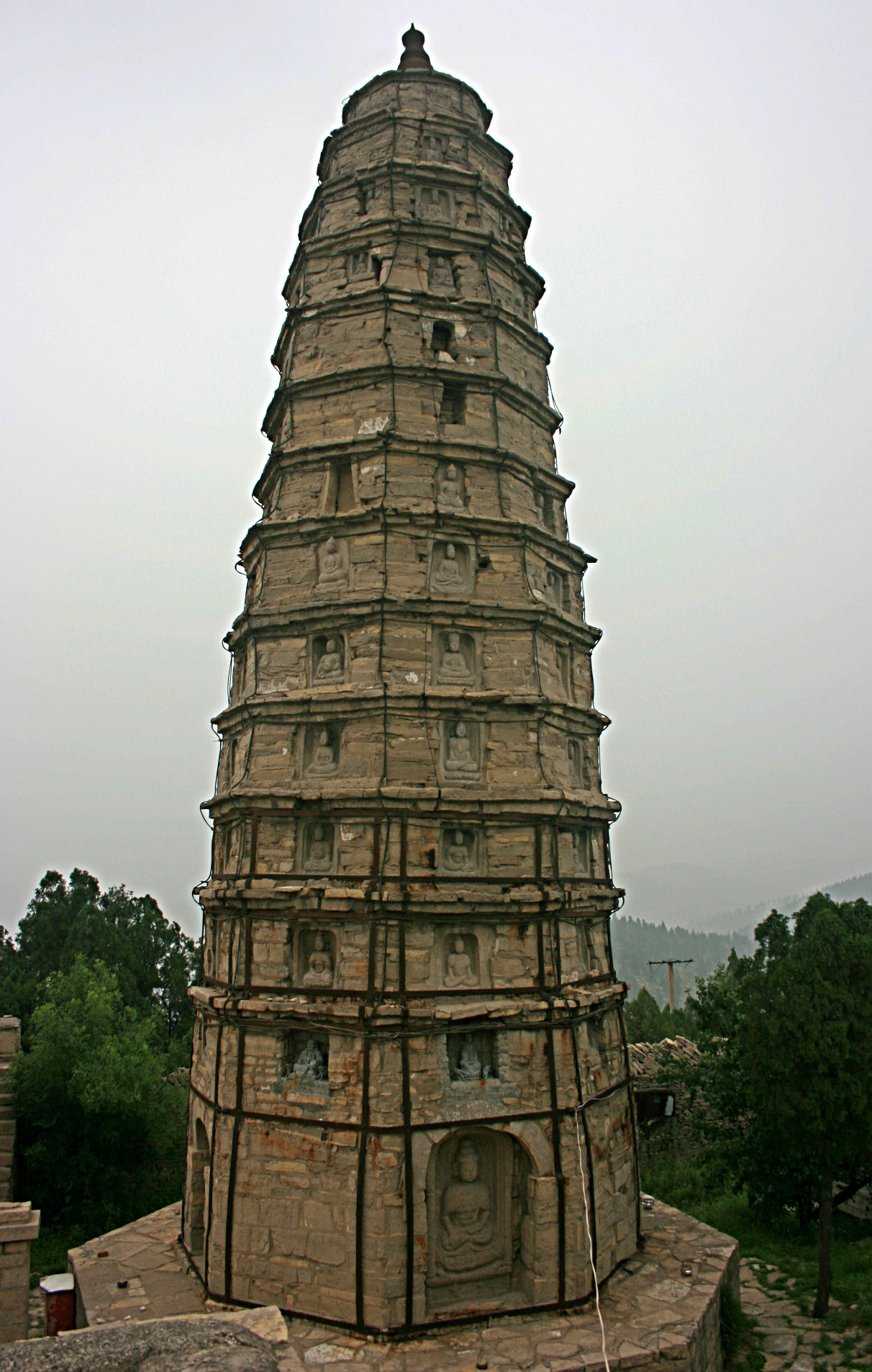
- Zhouhe Ruins 周河遗址 (2–111)
- Xin Village Han Tombs 新屯汉墓群 (3–110)
- Meng Village Han Tombs 孟庄汉墓群 (3–111)
- Confucian Temple 平阴文庙 (3–148)
- Yongji Bridge 永济桥 (3–157)
- Sishan Cliff Stele 平阴四山摩崖石刻 (3–228)

==== Jiyang ====
- Yuhuangzhong Ruins 玉皇冢遗址 (1–112)
- Lutaizi Ruins 刘台子遗址 (2–189)
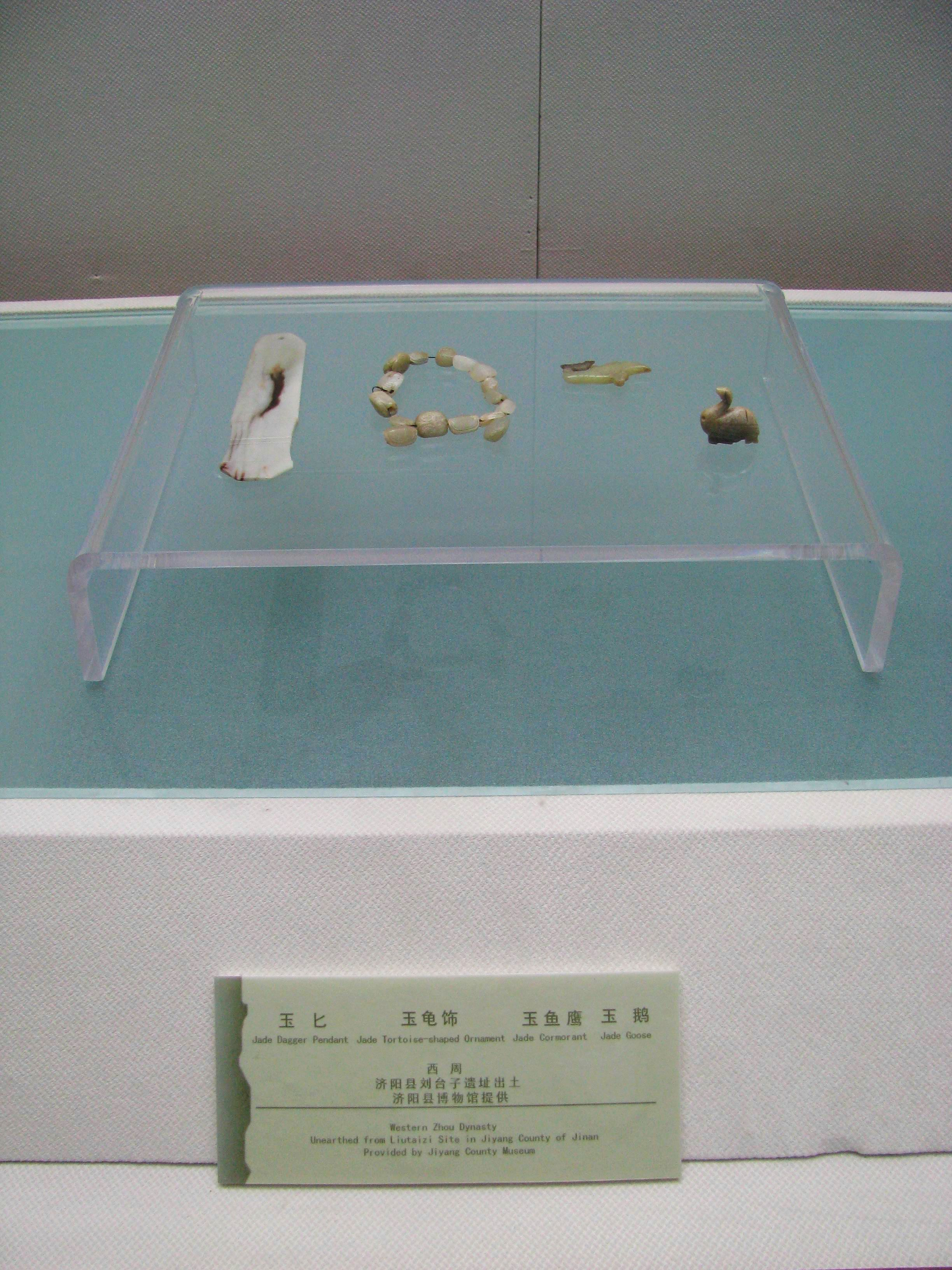

==== Shanghe ====
- Lufang Ruins 芦坊遗址 (2–190)
- Xiaoguan Village Tombs 小官庄墓群 (2–229)

=== Qingdao ===
==== Shinan ====
- Mao zhuxi zuo xiaji xingshi baogao jiniandi 毛主席作夏季形势报告纪念地 (1-07)
- Jiaozhou Governor's Hall 青岛提督府旧址 (2-63)
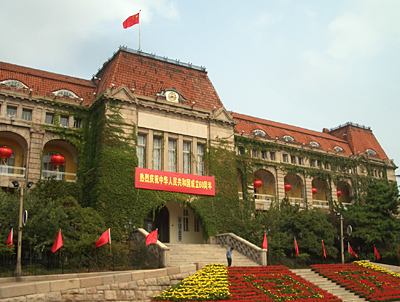
- Governor's Mansion 青岛提督楼旧址 (2-64)
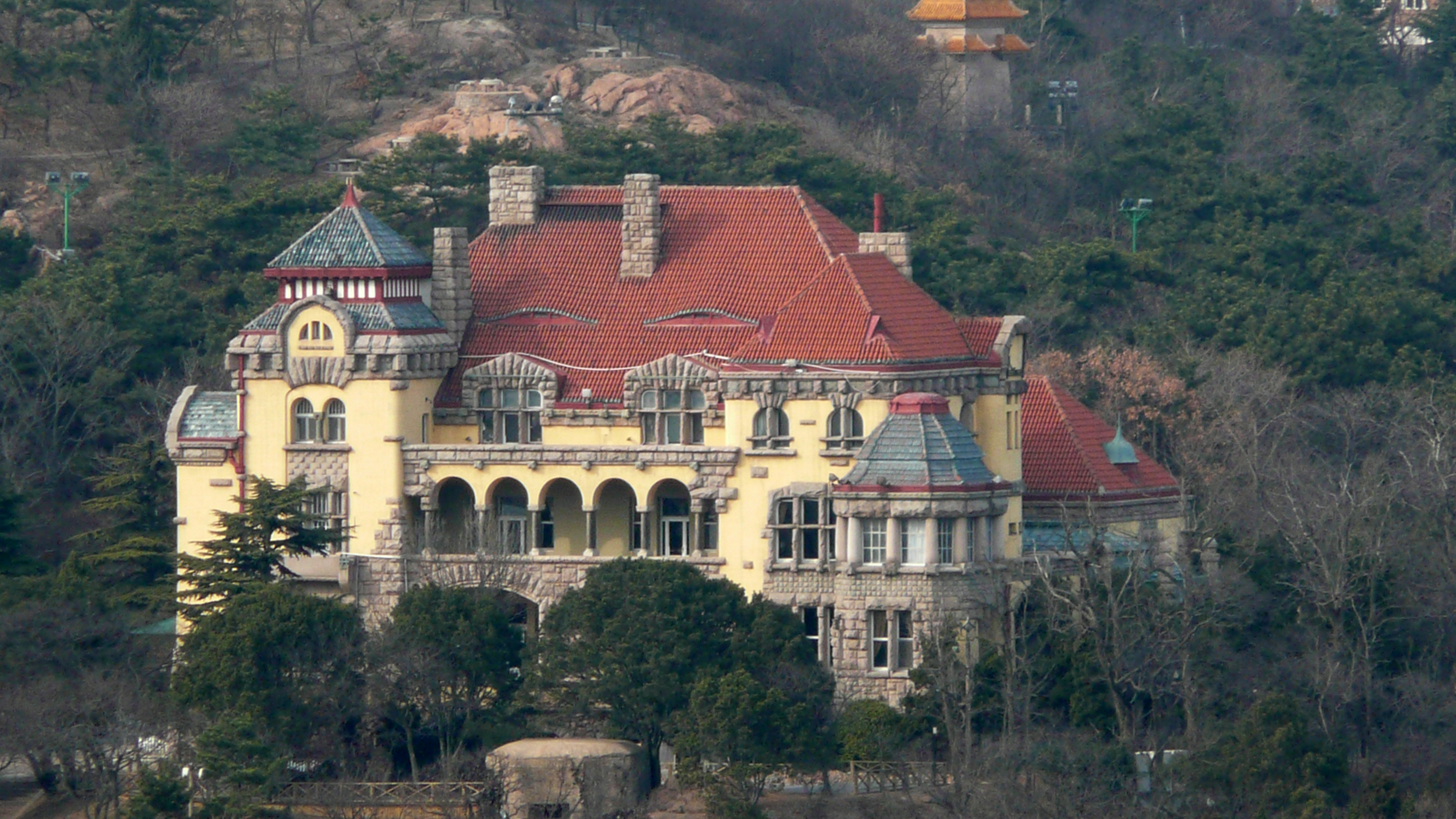
- German police headquarters building 青岛德国警察署旧址 (2-65)
- Badaguan Buildings 青岛八大关建筑群 (2-66)
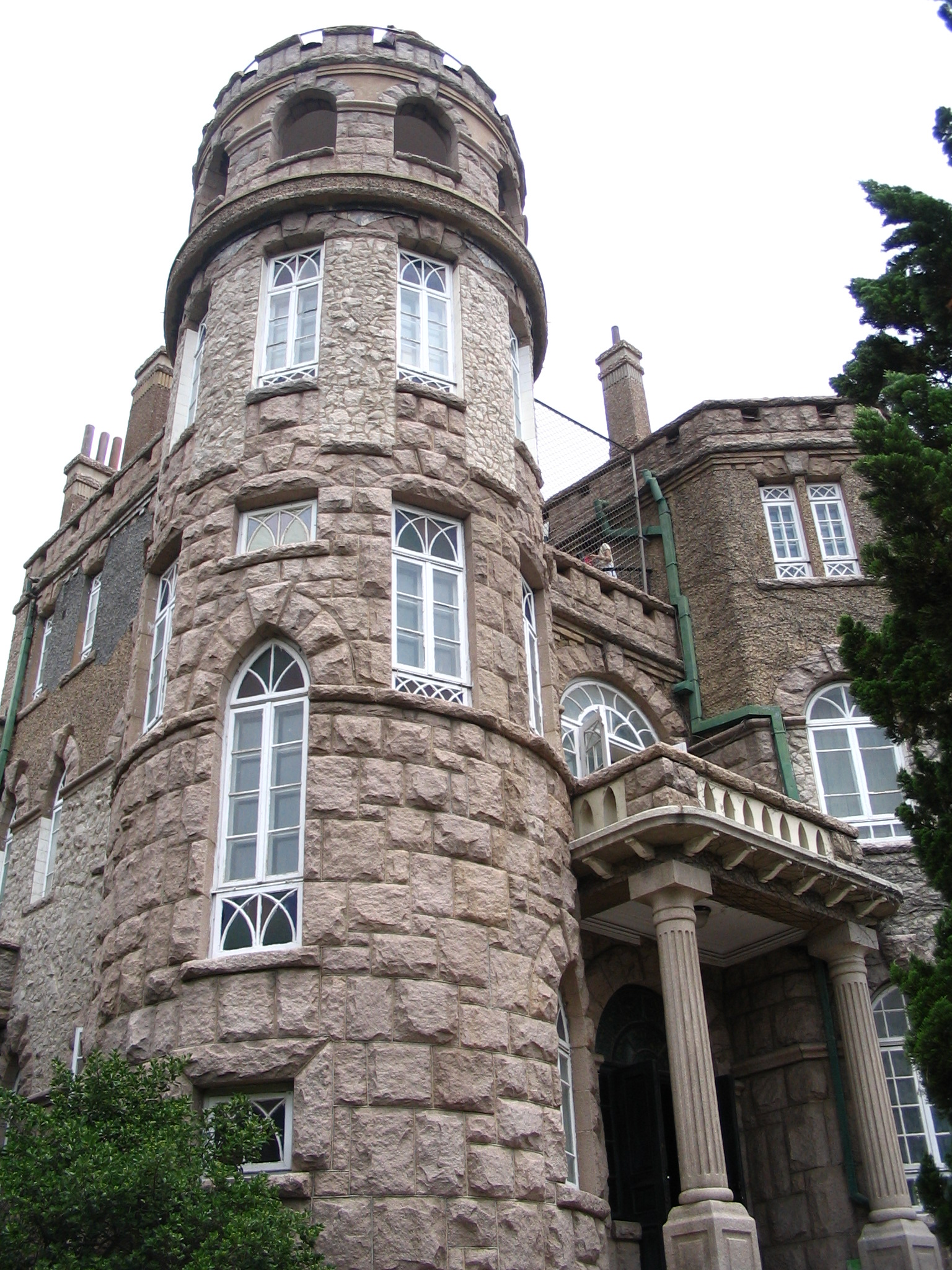
- Lutheran Church 青岛江苏路基督教堂 (2-67)
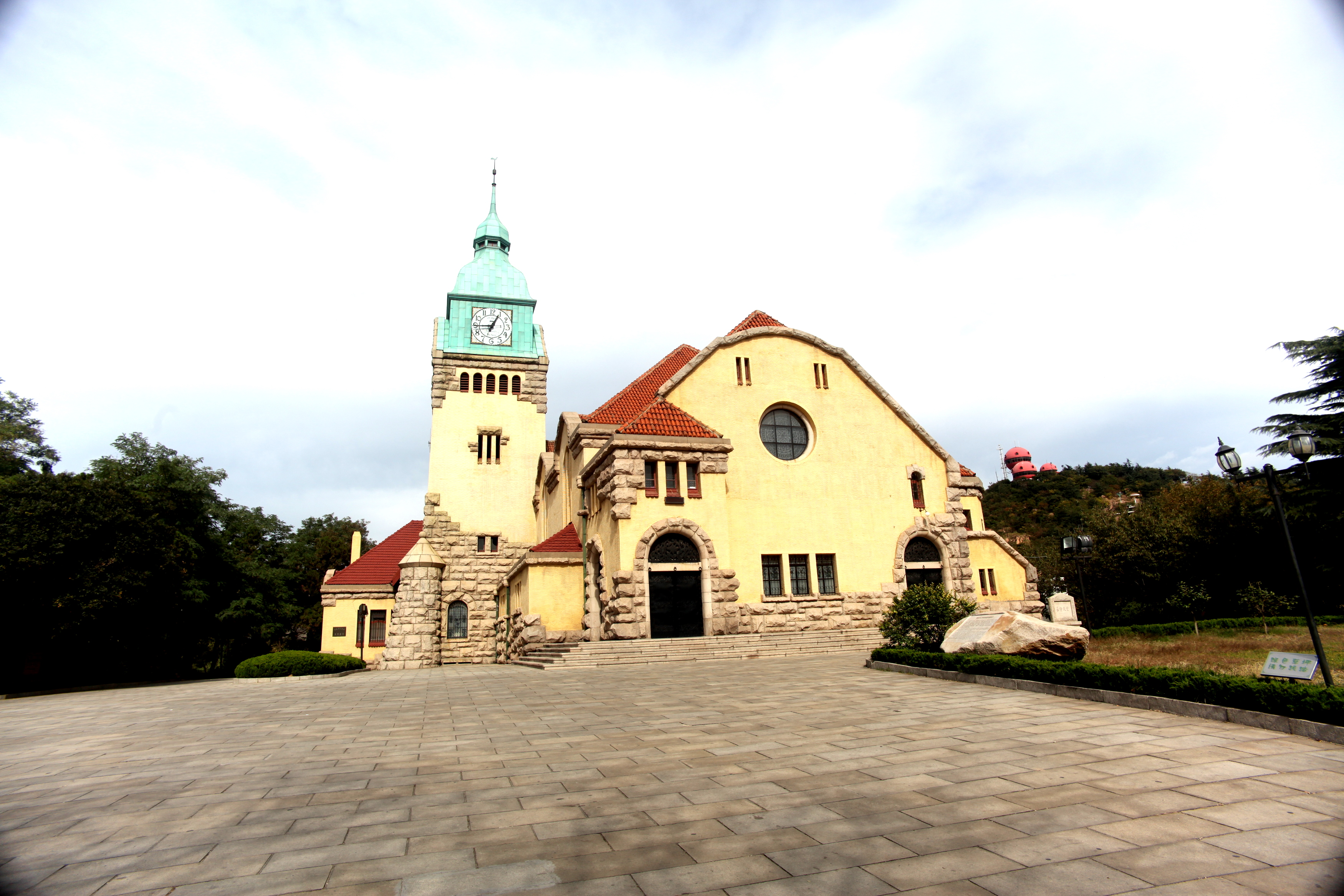
- St. Michael's Cathedral 青岛浙江路天主教堂 (2-68)
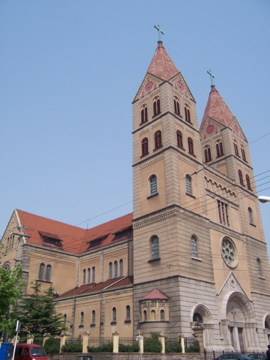
- Matsu Temple 青岛天后宫 (3–159)
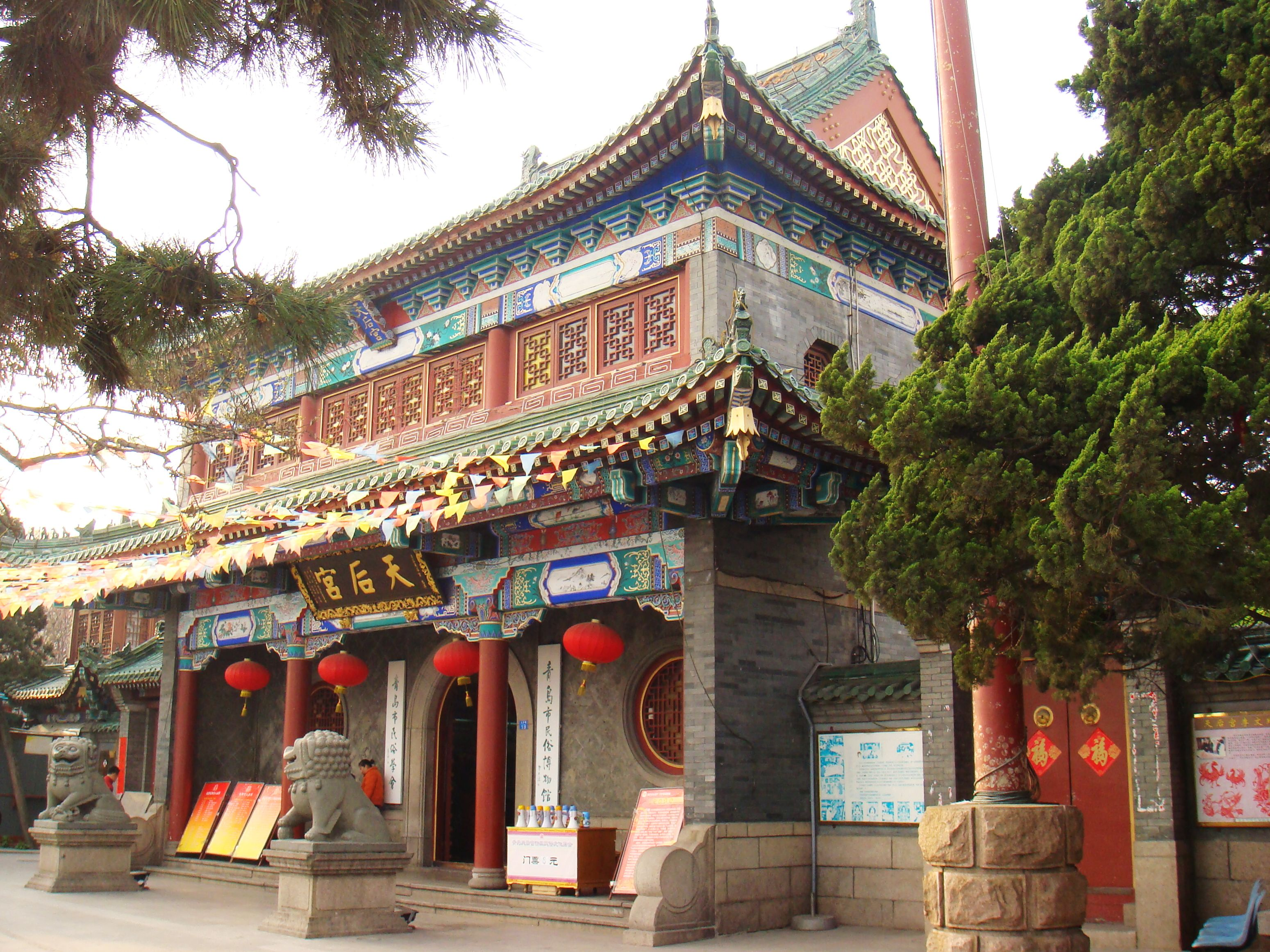
- Zhan Qiao Pier Pavilion 栈桥及回澜阁 (3–226)
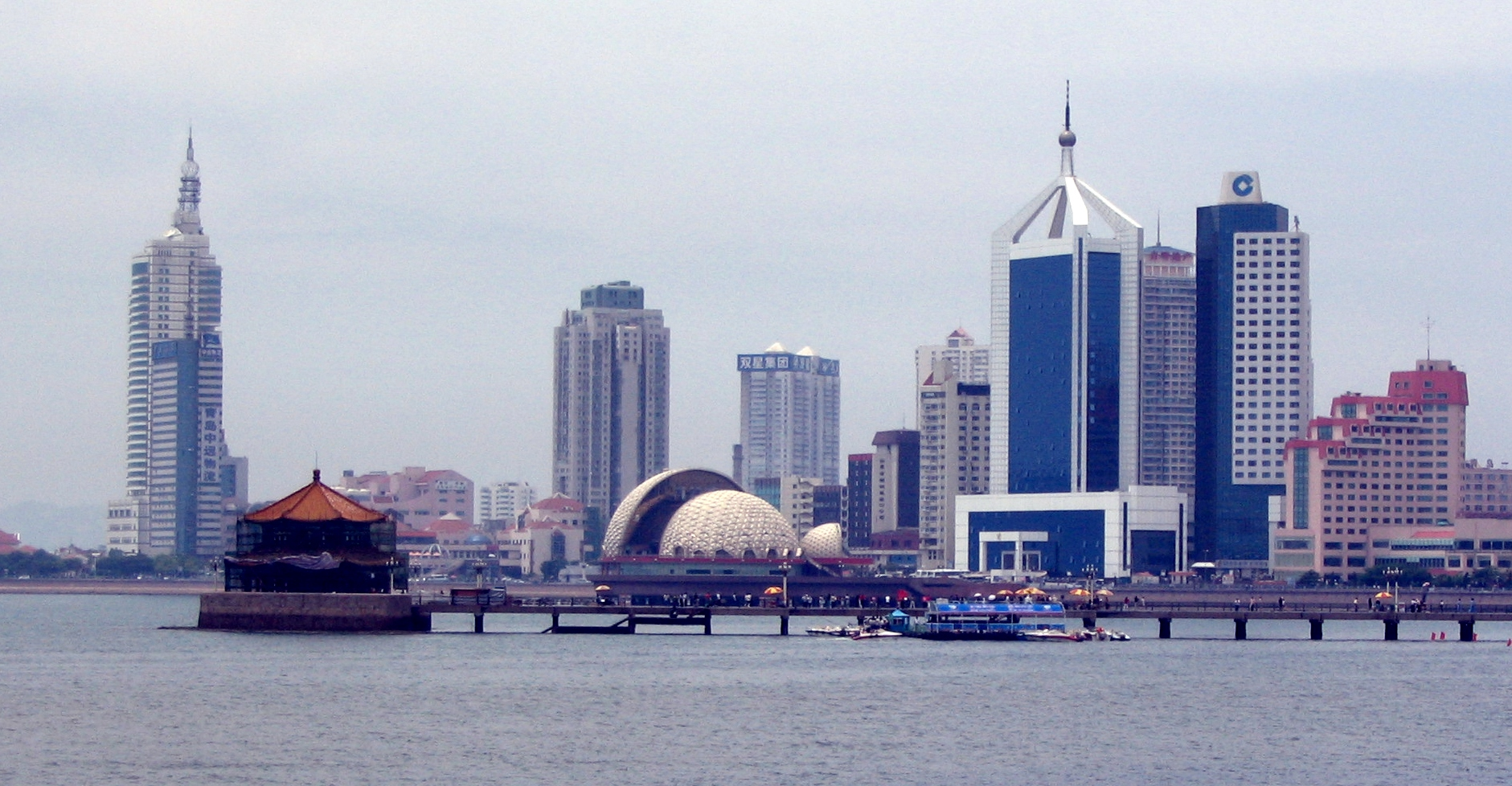
- Qingdao Zhongshan lu jindai jianzhu 青岛中山路近代建筑 (3–257)
- Former residence of Kang Youwei 康有为故居 (3–263)
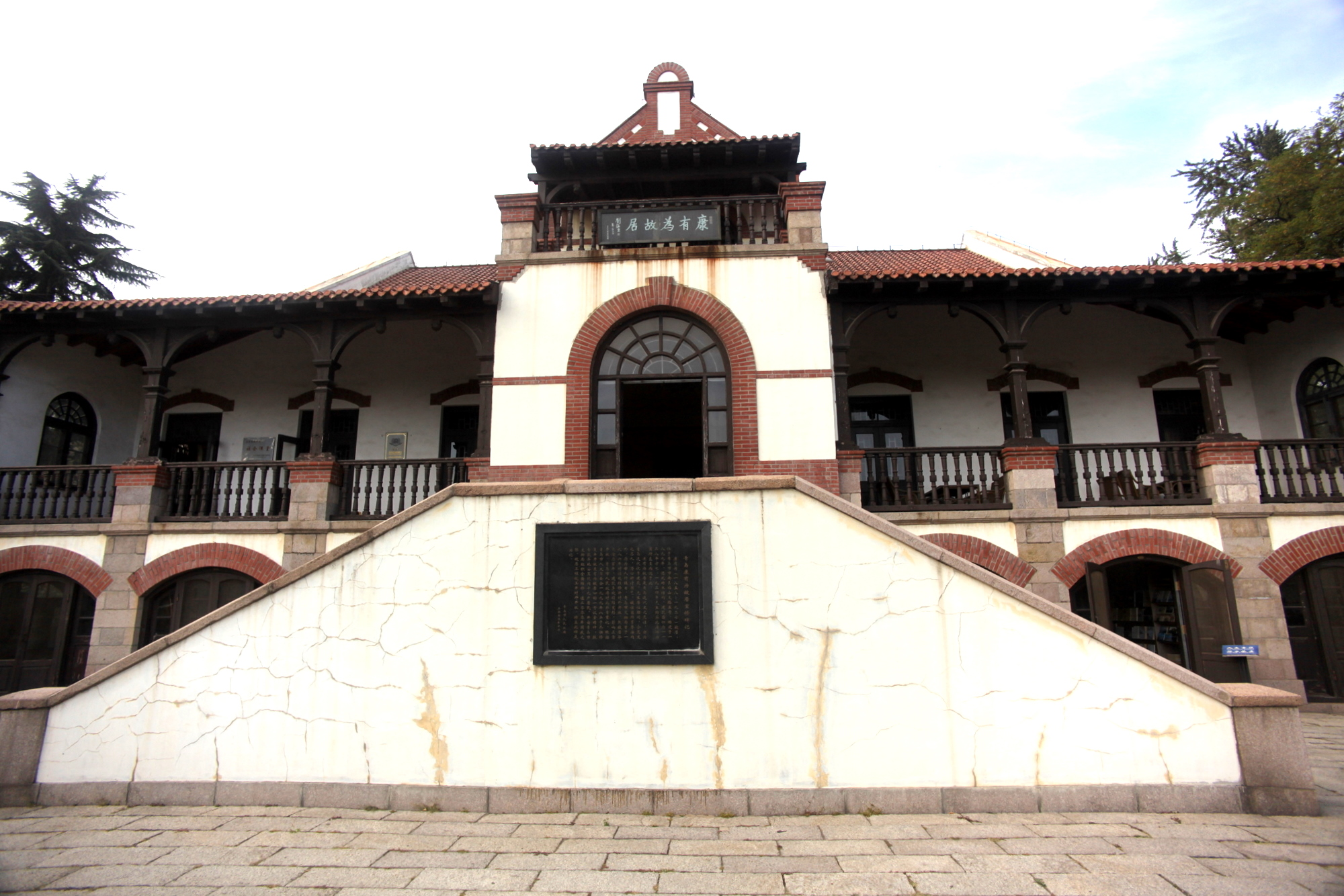
- Qingdao Aquarium 青岛水族馆 (3–267)
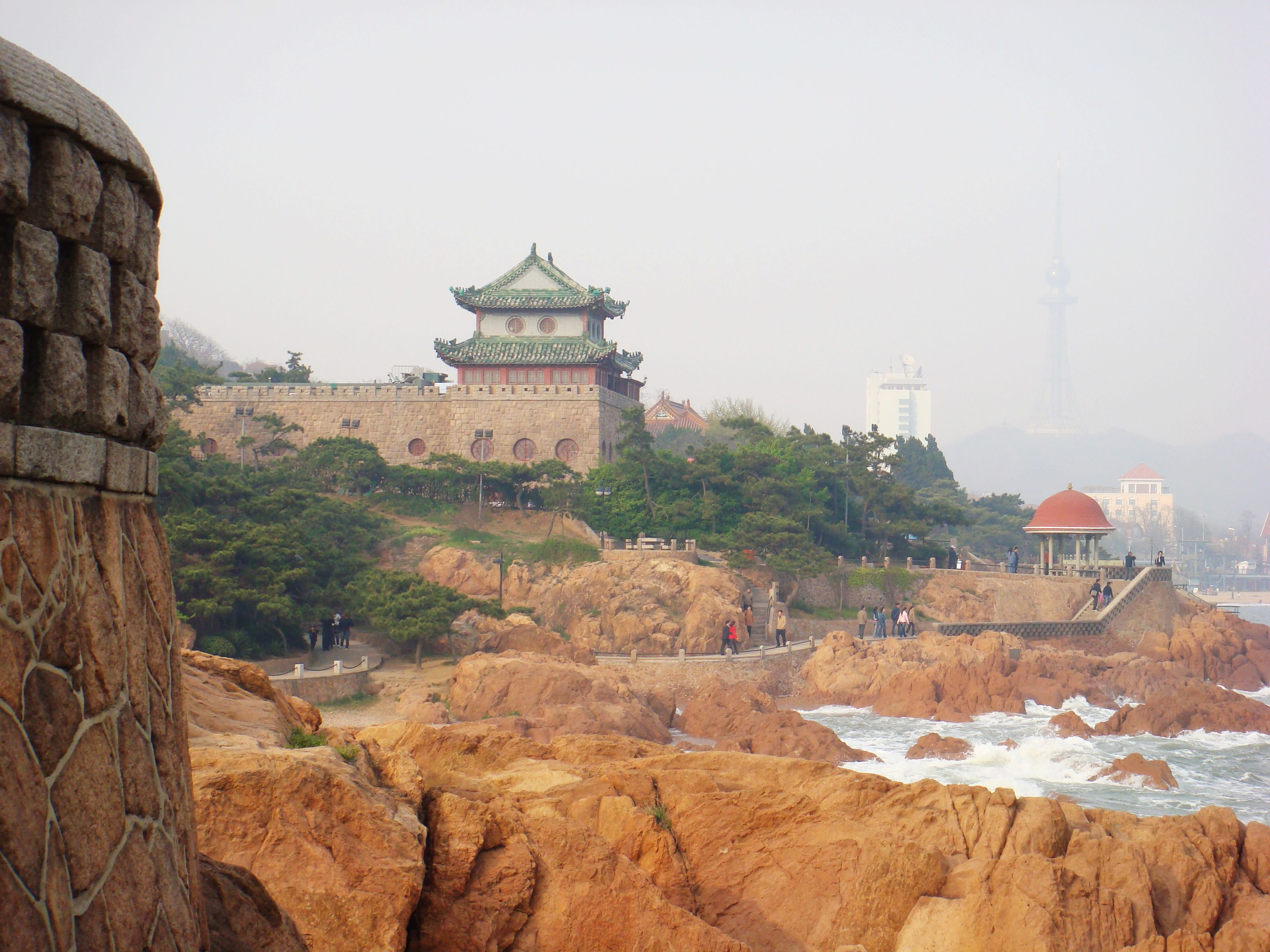

==== Shibei ====
- Qingdao Guantao lu jindai jianzhu 青岛馆陶路近代建筑 (3–249)

==== Sifang ====
- Zhong-Gong Qingdao difang zhibu jiuzhi 中共青岛地方支部旧址 (3–251)

==== Laoshan ====
- Shizaoxiang ji beike 石造像及碑刻 (1-33) (City Museum Qingdao)
- Chengzi Ruins 城子遗址 (1–115)
- Tomb of Kang Youwei 康有为墓 (2–11)

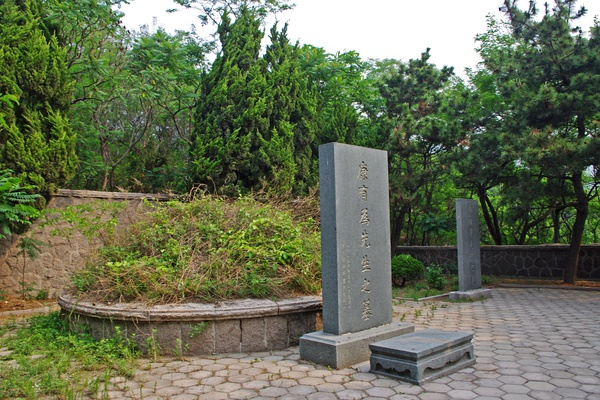

- Caibeigou Tombs 财贝沟墓群 (2–221)
- Laoshan Daoist Buildings 崂山道教建筑群 (3–128)
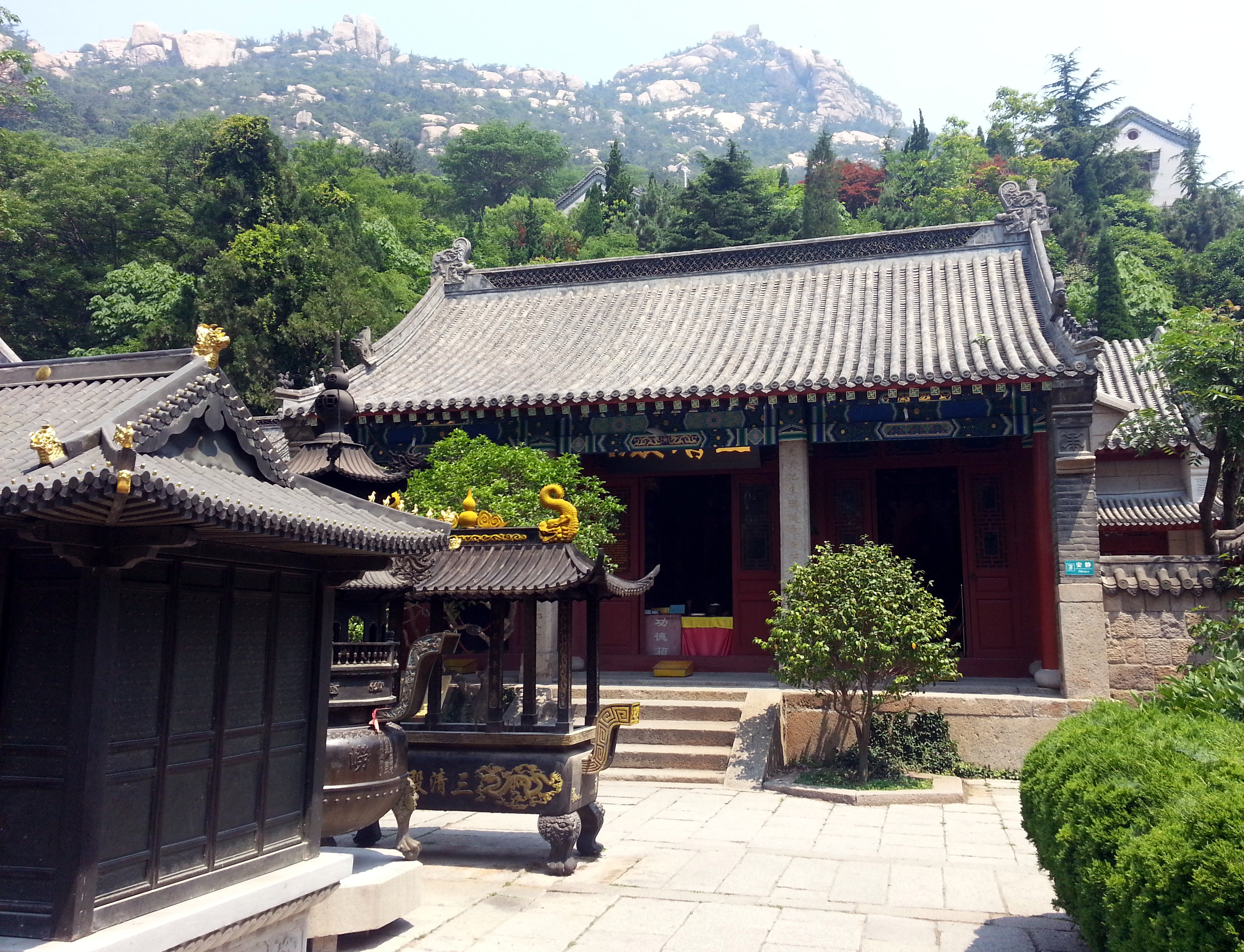

==== Chengyang 城阳区 ====
- Fahai Temple 法海寺 (3–129)

==== Jimo ====
- Nanqian Ruins 南阡遗址 (2–104)
- Xujiagou Ruins 徐家沟遗址 (2–145)
- Shiyuan Ruins 石原遗址 (2–146)
- Tianheng wubai yishi zhong 田横五百义士冢 (2–222)
- Xiaoqiao muqun 小桥墓群 (2–223)
- Xianzibu Ruins 现子埠遗址 (3–4)
- Jimo xianya 即墨县衙 (3–158)

==== Jiaozhou ====
- Sanlihe Ruins 三里河遗址 (2–105)
- Xi huang gu an Ruins 西皇姑庵遗址 (2–194)
- Zhaojiazhuang Ruins 赵家庄遗址 (3-3)
- Fuguo ducheng muma cheng yizhi ji mu qun 祓国都城牧马城遗址及墓群 (3-81)

==== Jiaonan ====
- Dongzaohu Ruins 东皂户遗址 (1-98)
- Langyetai Ruins 琅琊台遗址 (2–208)
- Xiangyang Ruins 向阳遗址 (3–2)

==== Pingdu ====
- Gaojia minbing lianfang Ruins 高家民兵联防遗址 (1-27)
- Liuqushan Tombs 六曲山墓群 (1–140)
- Dongyueshi Ruins 东岳石遗址 (2–180)
- Jimo guchengzhi 即墨故城址 (2–207)
- Dazeshan Stele ji Zhicang Temple Tomb Pagoda Forest 大泽山石刻及智藏寺墓塔林 (3–235)

==== Laixi ====
- Xishabu Ruins 西沙埠遗址 (3-79)
- Jie Wenqing lieshi jiu yichu 解文卿烈士就义处 (3–275)

=== Zibo ===
==== Zhangdian ====
- Heitieshan qiyi zhijunbu jiuzhi 黑铁山起义指挥部旧址 (2–10)
- Fushanyi Ruins 浮山驿遗址 (2-94)
- Pengjia Ruins 彭家遗址 (3–9)
- Changguo Ruins 昌国遗址 (3-76)

==== Linzi ====
- Tonglin, Tianwang Ruins 桐林、田旺遗址 (1-65)
- Linzi muqun 临淄墓群 (1–146)
- Houli Ruins 后李遗址 (2-87)
- Dongchu Ruins 董褚遗址 (2–147)
- Dapengke Ruins 大蓬科遗址 (2–148)
- Jishan muqun 稷山墓群 (2–227)

==== Zichuan ====
- Ma’anshan Kang-Ri jiuzhi 马鞍山抗日遗址 (1–11)
- Pu Songling guju 蒲松龄故居 (1-63)
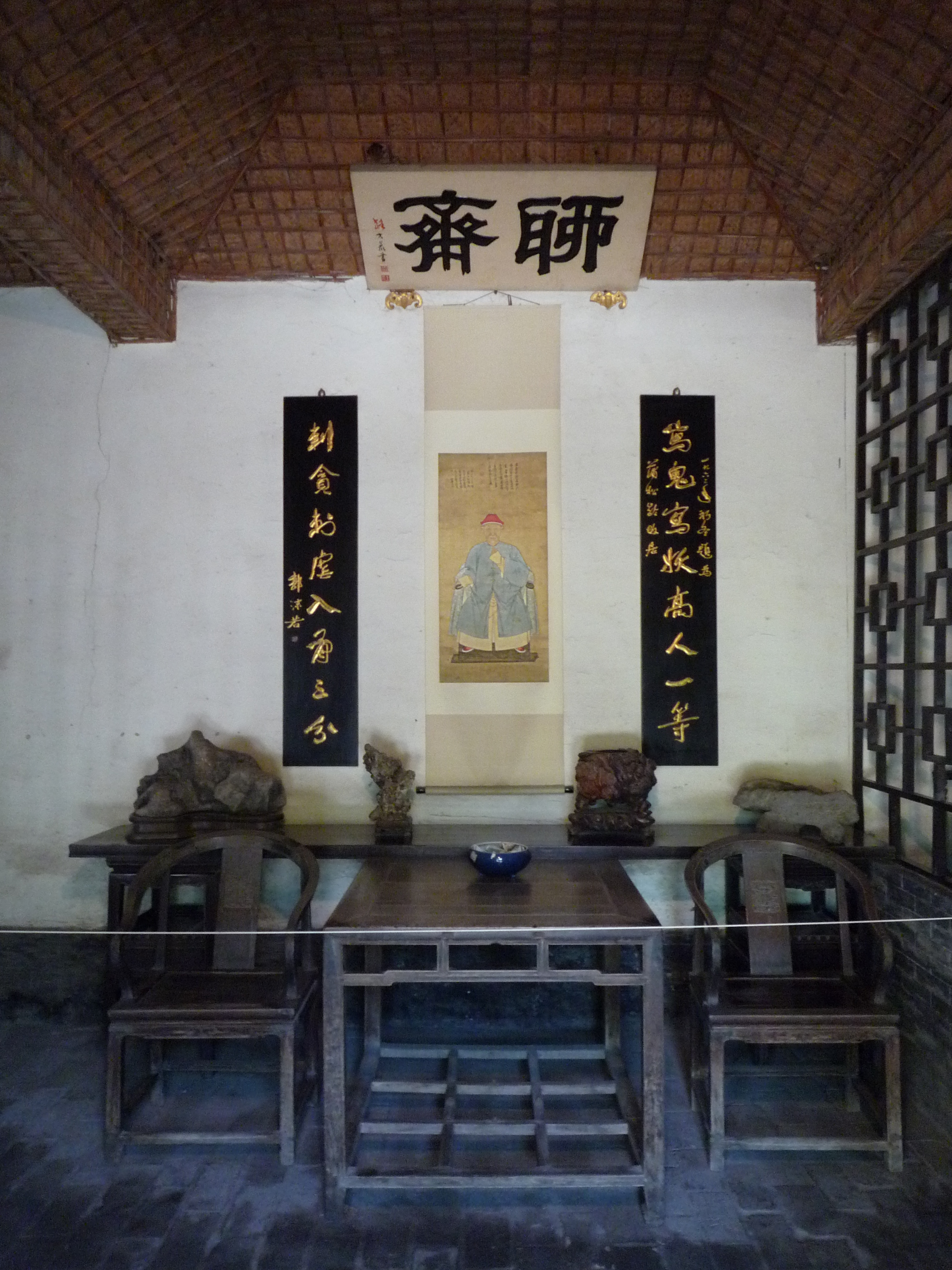
- Zhaili yaozhi 寨里窑址 (2–215)
- Beishen Ruins 北沈遗址 (3–8)
- Gongsun Ruins 公孙遗址 (3-61)
- Qianlai Ruins 前来遗址 (3-64)
- Cicun ciyaozhi 磁村瓷窑址 (3-88)
- Tomb of Su Qin 苏秦墓 (3–107)
- Tomb of Pu Luhun 蒲鲁浑墓 (3–121)
- Yangzhai Pagoda 杨寨塔 (3–143)
- Qingyun Pagoda 青云寺 (3–164)
- Pujia zhuang minsu jianzhuqun 蒲家庄民俗建筑群 (3–215)
- Zibo kuangwuju De-Ri jianzhuqun 淄博矿务局德日建筑群 (3–253)

==== Boshan ====
- Yan wen jiang Ancestral Hall 颜文姜祠 (2-31)
- Badou ciyaozhi 八陡瓷窑址 (3-90)
- Nanwanshan gu ciyao zhi 南万山古瓷窑址 (3-92)
- Tomb of Zhao Zhixin 赵执信墓 (3–126) (Zhao Zhixin)
- Hongmen 红门 (3–188)
- Lushen Temple 炉神庙 (3–189)
- Zhao Zhixin guju 赵执信故居 (3–217)

==== Zhoucun ====
- Zhoucun gu shangye jie 周村古商业街 (3–146)
- Bi Ziyan guju 毕自严故居 (3–163)
- Qianfo ge gu jianzhu qun 千佛阁古建筑群 (3–216)

==== Zibo ... ====
Zibo Gaoxin jishi chanye kaifa qu 淄博高新技术产业开发区

- Jiejia Ruins 解家遗址 (3–10)
- Dahe Southern Han Tomb 大河南汉墓 (3–119)
- Huntun Han Tomb 军屯汉墓 (3–120)

==== Huantai ====
- Xiaolong Ruins 小庞遗址 (1–105)
- Wangshi Ancestral Hall 王氏祠堂 (2-32)
- Qianfu Ruins 前埠遗址 (2–149)
- Tangshan Ruins 唐山遗址 (3–11)
- Lizhai Ruins 李寨遗址 (3–12)
- Shijia Ruins 史家遗址 (3-55)
- Wang Yuyang guju ji muzang 王渔洋故居及墓葬 (3–219)

==== Gaoqing ====
- Qingcheng Wenchang Pavilion 青城文昌阁 (2-33)
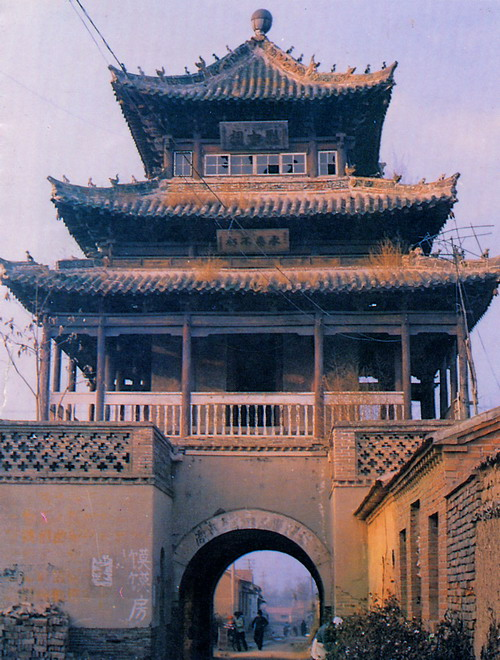
- Tomb of Lu Zhonglian 鲁仲连墓 (3–108) (Lu Zhonglian)

==== Yiyuan ====
- Xiyutai Ruins 西鱼台遗址 (3–13)
- Bei tao hua ping Ruins 北桃花坪遗址 (3–14)
- Yiyuan yuanren huashi didian 沂源猿人化石地点 (2-80)
- Shangya dong Ruins 上崖洞遗址 (2-81)
- Zhinü Cave 织女洞 (3–218)
- Tangshan Cliff Statue 唐山摩崖造像 (3–230)
- Dong’an Old City Ruins 东安古城遗址 (3-78)

=== Zaozhuang ===
==== Shizhong 市中区 ====
- Su-Lu-Yu-Wan bianqu tegongwei jiuzhi 苏鲁豫皖边区特工委旧址 (2–9)
- Hua de zhong xing meikuang gongsi 华德中兴煤矿公司 (3–195)
- Guoji yanghang jiuzhi 国际洋行旧址 (3–270)
- Tiedaoyou jidui jiuzhi 铁道游击队旧址 (3–288)

==== Shanting ====
- Baodugu gu jianzhu 抱犊崮古建筑 (3–131)
- Puzhao Temple 普照寺 (3–132)
- Jianxin Ruins 建新遗址 (3-32)
- Dongjiang Ruins 东江遗址 (3-59)

==== Fengcheng (峄城区) ====
- Hongtufu Ruins 红土埠遗址 (2–113)
- Erliucheng Ruins 二疏城遗址 (2–178)
- Tomb of Kuang Heng 匡衡墓 (2–228)
- Qingtan Temple 青檀寺 (3–196)
- Shiwushan quan Stele 石屋山泉石刻 (3–236)
- Guogong tanpan jiuzhi 国共谈判旧址 (3–273)
- Yangjiabu Ruins 杨家埠遗址 (3-38)
- Woluo Ruins 沃洛遗址 (3-39)
- Xingdian Ruins 邢店遗址 (3-40)
- Yuecheng gucheng 岳城故城 (3-77)
- Wangfutai Ruins 望夫台遗址 (3-83)

==== Tai'erzhuang ====
- Biyang gucheng 逼阳故城 (1-66)
- Nantanzi Ruins 南滩子遗址 (2–112)
- Heyao Tombs 贺窑墓群 (2–238)
- Houtang Old Temple 侯塘古寺 (3–194)
- Shaimicheng Ruins 晒米城遗址 (3-33)

==== Xuecheng ====
- Shagou Ruins 沙沟遗址 (2–114)
- Zhongchen Hao ciyao zhi 中陈郝瓷窑址 (2–213)*
- Niushan Sunshi zong Ancestral Hall 牛山孙氏宗祠 (3–160)
- Xi zhong zao che Ruins 奚仲造车遗址 (3-57)
- Nanchang gucheng 南常故城 (3-71)
- Anyang gucheng 安阳故城 (3-84)

==== Tengzhou ====
- Gangshang Ruins 岗上遗址 (1-75)
- Tengguo gucheng 滕国故城 (1-78)
- Xueguo gucheng 薛国故城 (1-79)
- Beixin Ruins 北辛遗址 (2-91)
- Longquan Pagoda 龙泉塔 (3–138)
- Tengzhou xianya 滕州县衙 (3–161)
- Huangling jiuzhi 皇陵旧址 (3–162)
- Baishou fang 百寿坊 (3–197)
- Wang Jia Ancestral Hall 王家祠堂 (3–198)
- Liushi Jia Ancestral Hall 刘氏家祠 (3–199)
- Zhangshi Ancestral Hall 张氏祠堂 (3–200)
- Tangdai shidiao qun 唐代石雕群 (3–234)
- Zhuanglixi Ruins 庄里西遗址 (3-34)
- Xikangliu Ruins 西康留遗址 (3-47)
- Qianzhangda Ruins 前掌大遗址 (3-60)

=== Dongying ===
==== Guangrao ====
- Nan Song Dadian 南宋大殿 (1-58)
- Yingzi Ruins 营子遗址 (1–104)
- Zhongtou Tombs 冢头墓群 (1–141)
- Fujia Ruins 傅家遗址 (2–115)
- Wucun Ruins 五村遗址 (3–7)
- Baiqin tai 柏寝台 (3-74)

==== Lijin ====
- Nan wang can gu yao zhi 南望参古窑址 (2–198)

=== Yantai ===
==== Zhifu ====
- Yantai Yingguo lingshiguan jiuzhi 烟台英国领事馆旧址 (2-52)
- Yantai Donghai guanshui wusi gongshu jiuzhi 烟台东海关税务司公署旧址 (2-53)
- Zhangyu gongsi yuanzhi 张裕公司原址 (2-54)
- Yantai jidu jiaochang Old Meeting Hall 烟台基督教长老会堂 (2-55)
- Fujian Meeting Hall 福建会馆 (2-58)
- Zhifu julebu jiuzhi 芝罘俱乐部旧址 (2-60)
- Kongdong dao deng Pagoda 崆峒岛灯塔 (2-61)
- Yantai dong, xi paotai 烟台东、西炮台 (2-62)
- Baishicun Ruins 白石村遗址 (2-93)
- Yangzhu Temple Ruins 阳主庙遗址 (2–200)
- Yuhuangding gu jianzhu qun 毓璜顶古建筑群 (3–155)
- Qishansuo 奇山所 (3–174)
- Eshan lingshi 俄国领事馆旧址 (3–276)
- Qiyo xueguan jiuzhi 启唷学馆旧址 (3–277)
- Zhongguo neidi huixuejiao jiuzhi 中国内地会学校旧址 (3–278)

==== Fushan ====
- Qiujiazhuang Ruins 邱家庄遗址 (3-26)
- Sanshili pao Tombs 三十里堡墓群 (1–136)
- Sanshili pao gucheng gucheng 三十里堡故城址 (2–199)
- Dachengzhan jiuzhi 大成栈旧址 (3–279)

==== Muping ====
- Leishen Temple zhandou Ruins 雷神庙战斗遗址 (1-22)
- Haduiding Ruins 蛤堆顶遗址 (1-91)
- Zhaogezhuang Ruins 照格庄遗址 (2–181)
- Li cha tu xiang Ruins 蛎碴土巷遗址 (3-29)
- Xuyang yuan jiuzhi 恤养院旧址 (3–268)
- Zhang Yanshan Former Residence 张颜山旧宅 (3–272)

==== Laishan ====
- Wutai Ruins 午台遗址 (3-27)
- Laoyingding Ruins 老茔顶遗址 (3-28)
- Mashanzhai Ruins 马山寨遗址 (3-95)

==== Longkou ====
- Guicheng gucheng 归城故城 (1-95)
- Dingshi guzhai 丁氏故宅 (2-59)
- Zhuangtou Tombs 庄头墓群 (2–218)
- Louzizhuang Ruins 楼子庄遗址 (3-35)
- Miao zhou jia Qin han jianzhu Ruins 庙周家秦汉建筑遗址 (3-80)
- Chongshi zhongxue jiuzhi 崇实中学旧址 (3–250)

==== Laiyang ====
- Qianheqian Tombs 前河前墓群 (1–138)
- Song Wan guju 宋琬故居 (2-56)

==== Laizhou ====
- Yunfengshan moya keshi 云峰山摩崖刻石 (1-37)
- Shenxian Cave shiku Statue 神仙洞石窟造像 (2-27)
- Suanyuanzi Ruins 蒜园子遗址 (2–108)
- Dangli gucheng zhi 当利故城址 (2–212)
- Mao Ji, Tomb of Mao Min 毛纪、毛敏墓 (2–249)
- Gaipingshan Cliff Stone Statue 盖平山摩崖石造像 (3–229)
- Liuzishan jiuzhai 刘子山旧宅 (3–265)

==== Zhaoyuan ====
- Qucheng Old City zhi 曲成故城址 (2–196)
- Xinzhuang Tombs 辛庄墓群 (2–219)
- Biguo Tombs 毕郭墓群 (3–103)

==== Penglai ====
- Penglai Water City 蓬莱水城 (1-55)
- Liujiagou Ruins 刘家沟遗址 (1-93)
- Cunliji Tombs 村里集墓群 (1–137)
- Qi Jiguang Ancestral Hall 戚继光祠 (2-57)
- Dazhongjia Ruins 大仲家遗址 (2–107)
- Nanwangxu Ruins 南王绪遗址 (3-30)
- Tomb of Qi Jiguang 戚继光墓 (3–124)
- Jiesongying Old City 解宋营古城 (3–175)

==== Qixia ====
- Taocai geming lieshi lingyuan 桃村革命烈士陵园 (1-23)
- Mou er hei zi di zhu zhuang yuan 牟二黑子地主庄园 (1-57)
- Yangjia quan Ruins 杨家圈遗址 (1-92)
- Beichengzi Ruins 北城子遗址 (2–150)
- Lishi zhuangyuan 李氏庄园 (3–224)

==== Haiyang ====
- Zhaotuan dileizhan Ruins 赵疃地雷战遗址 (1-24)
- Chengziding Ruins 城子顶遗址 (2–151)
- Zuiziqian Tombs 嘴子前墓群 (2–220)
- Dayucun Ruins 大榆村遗址 (3-31)

==== Changdao ====
- Beizhuang Ruins 北庄遗址 (2–106)
- Houji Island Lighthouse 猴矶岛灯塔 (3–223)
- Zhenzhumen Ruins 珍珠门遗址 (3-58)
- Miaodao gucheng ji Xianying gong Ruins 庙岛故城址及显应宫遗址 (3-91)

=== Weifang ===
==== Weicheng ====
- Weixian Temple of the City God 潍县城隍庙 (2-36)
- Wanyin Building 万印楼 (2-37)
- Guo Weiqu guju „Liuyuan“ 郭味蕖故居“疏园” (3–238)

==== Hanting ====
- Hanting qian bu xia Old Culture Ruins 寒亭前埠下古文化遗址 (3-21)
- Hanting Yikong Bridge 寒亭一孔桥 (3–150)
- Hanting Xiyangjia bu buban nianhua jiuzuo fang 寒亭西杨家埠木版年画旧作坊 (3–186)
- Hanting Yushi zhaiyuan minju 寒亭于氏宅院民居 (3–187)
- Hanting huiquanzhuang Ruins 寒亭会泉庄遗址 (3-62)

==== Fangzi ====
- De-Ri shi jianzhuqun 德日式建筑群 (3–256)

==== Qingzhou ====
- Tuoshan Grottoes 驼山石窟造像 (1-32)
- Xiaojia Village Ruins 萧家庄遗址 (1-97)
- Subutun Tombs 苏埠屯墓群 (1–139)
- Yunmenshan shiku Statue 云门山石窟造像 (2-21)
- Zhenjiao Mosque 青州真教寺 (2-34)
- Prince of Heng Palace shifang 衡王府石坊 (2-39)
- Fenghuangtai Ruins 凤凰台遗址 (2-153)
- Chengjiagou Old Tomb 程家沟古墓 (2-236)
- Tomb of Prince Gong of Heng 衡恭王墓 (2-251)

==== Zhucheng ====
- Former Residence of Wang Jinmei 王尽美烈士故居 (1-25)
- Former Residence of Kang Sheng 康生故居 (1-26)
- Chengchengzi Ruins 呈程子遗址 (3-22)
- Qianzhai Ruins 前寨遗址 (3-23)
- Liujizhuangzi Ruins 六吉庄子遗址 (3-24)
- Shihetou Ruins 石河头遗址 (2-162)
- Gaojiazhucun Tombs 高家朱村墓群 (2-234)

==== Shouguang ====
- Wosongtai Ruins 呙宋台遗址 (1-100)
- Jiguo gucheng 纪国故城 (1-101)
- Zhao Wangpu Ruins 赵旺铺遗址 (2-118)
- Bianxianwang Ruins 边线王遗址 (2-157)

==== Anqiu ====
- Anshangshifang 庵上石坊 (2-38)
- Tianjia lou Ruins 田家楼遗址 (2-117)
- Zheng jia xia zhuang Ruins 郑家下庄遗址 (2-154)
- Chengyi cheng 城遗城 (2-155)
- Tianjia wenpan Ruins 田家汶泮遗址 (2-191)
- Anqiu Dongjiazhuang hanhuaxiang Stone Tomb 安丘董家庄汉画像石墓 (3-112)

==== Gaomi ====
- Tomb of Zheng Xuan 郑玄墓 (2-235)

==== Changyi ====
- Jiangshi Ancestral Hall 姜氏祠堂 (3-206)

==== Changle ====
- Xiji Ruins 西级遗址 (2-119)
- Yuanjiazhuang Ruins 袁家庄遗址 (2-158)
- Pangjiazhuang Ruins 庞家庄遗址 (2-159)
- Yingqiu Ruins 营丘遗址 (2-160)
- Hexi Ruins 河西遗址 (2-161)
- Yingling guchengzhi 营陵故城址 (2-197)

==== Linqu ====
- Shan wang gu shengwuhua 山旺古生物化石保护 (1-96)
- Shimen fang Statue Group 石门坊造像群 (2-22)
- Weijia Ruins 魏家遗址 (2-156)
- Haifushan Tombs 海浮山墓群 (2-244)
- Dongzhen Temple 东镇庙 (3-225)

=== Jining ===
==== Shizhong (市中区) ====
- Hanbei qun 汉碑群 (1-35)
- Jining Iron Pagoda 济宁铁塔 (1-48)
- Jining Dongda Temple 济宁东大寺 (2-40)
- Liuxingdong Temple 柳行东寺 (3-173)
- Lüjia zhaiyuan 吕家宅院 (3-207)
- Ci xiao jian wan fang 慈孝兼完坊 (3-208)
- Pan jia da lou 潘家大楼 (3-284)
- Paifang jie Libaitang 牌坊街礼拜堂 (含教士楼)(3-285)

==== Rencheng ====
- Sihuidui Ruins 寺堌堆遗址 (1-74)
- Xiaowangzhuang Tombs 萧王庄墓群 (1-128)
- Daizhuang Catholic Church 戴庄天主教堂 (2-46)
- Kangfu gucheng zhi 亢父故城址 (2-210)
- Fenghuang tai Ruins 凤凰台遗址 (3-36)
- Shihai Ruins 史海遗址 (3-48)
- Rencheng Chengziya Ruins 任城城子崖遗址 (3-54)

==== Qufu ====
- Zhu zongsiling zhaokai junshi huiyi huizhi 朱总司令召开军事会议会址 (1-08)
- Temple of Yan Hui 颜庙 (1-45)
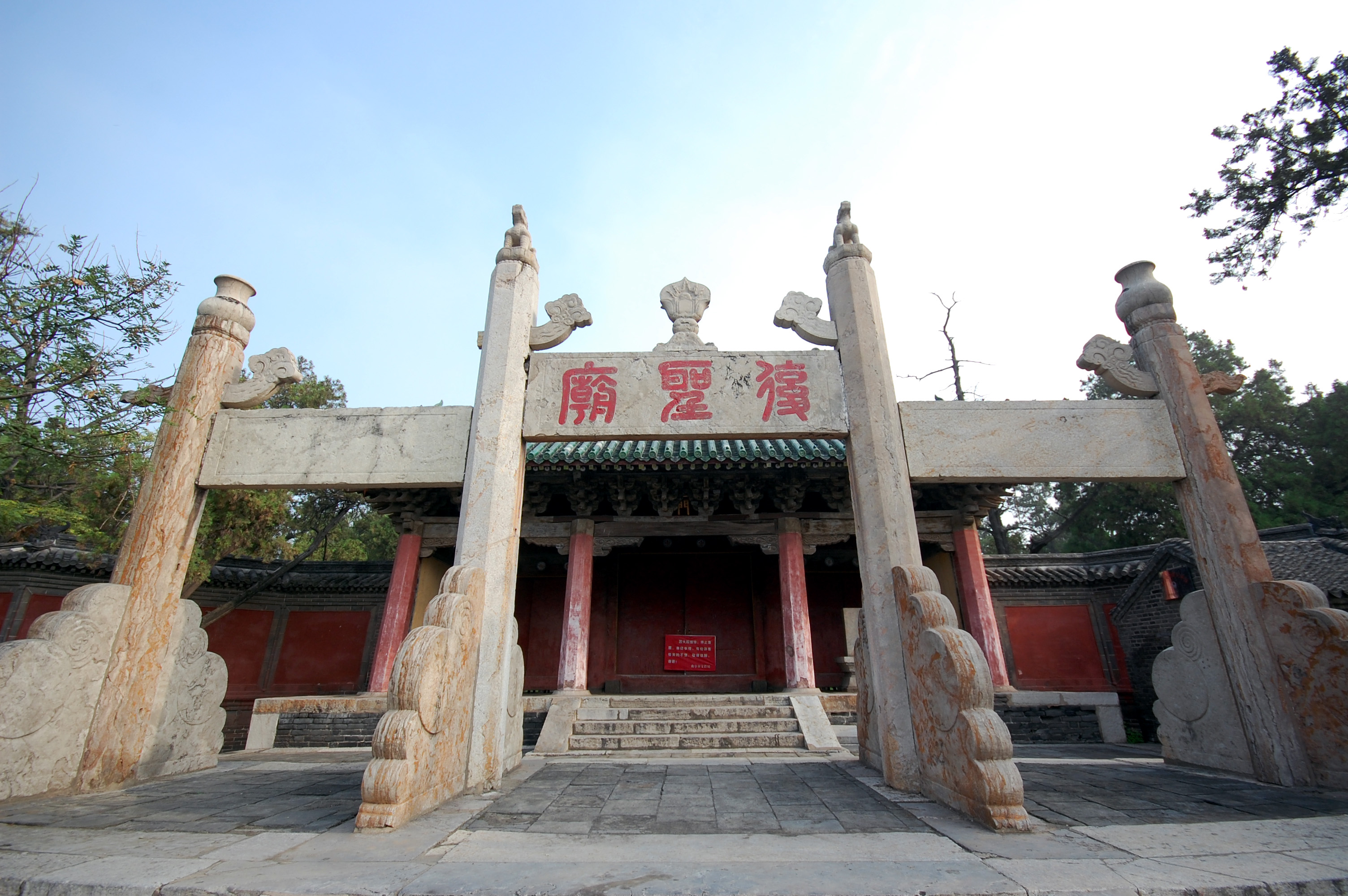
- Duke of Zhou Temple 周公庙 (1-46)
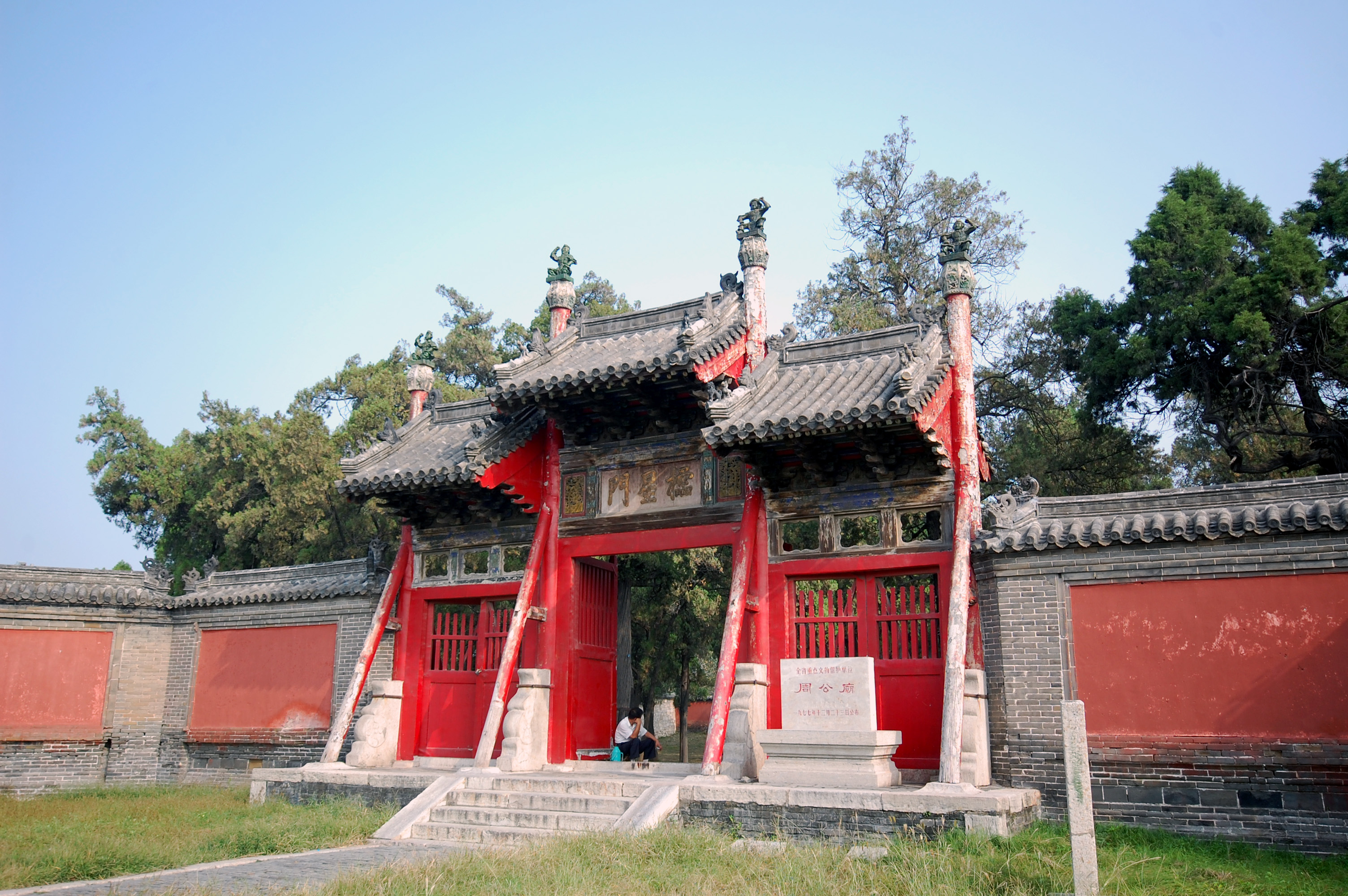
- Nishan jianzhuqun 尼山建筑群 (1-47)
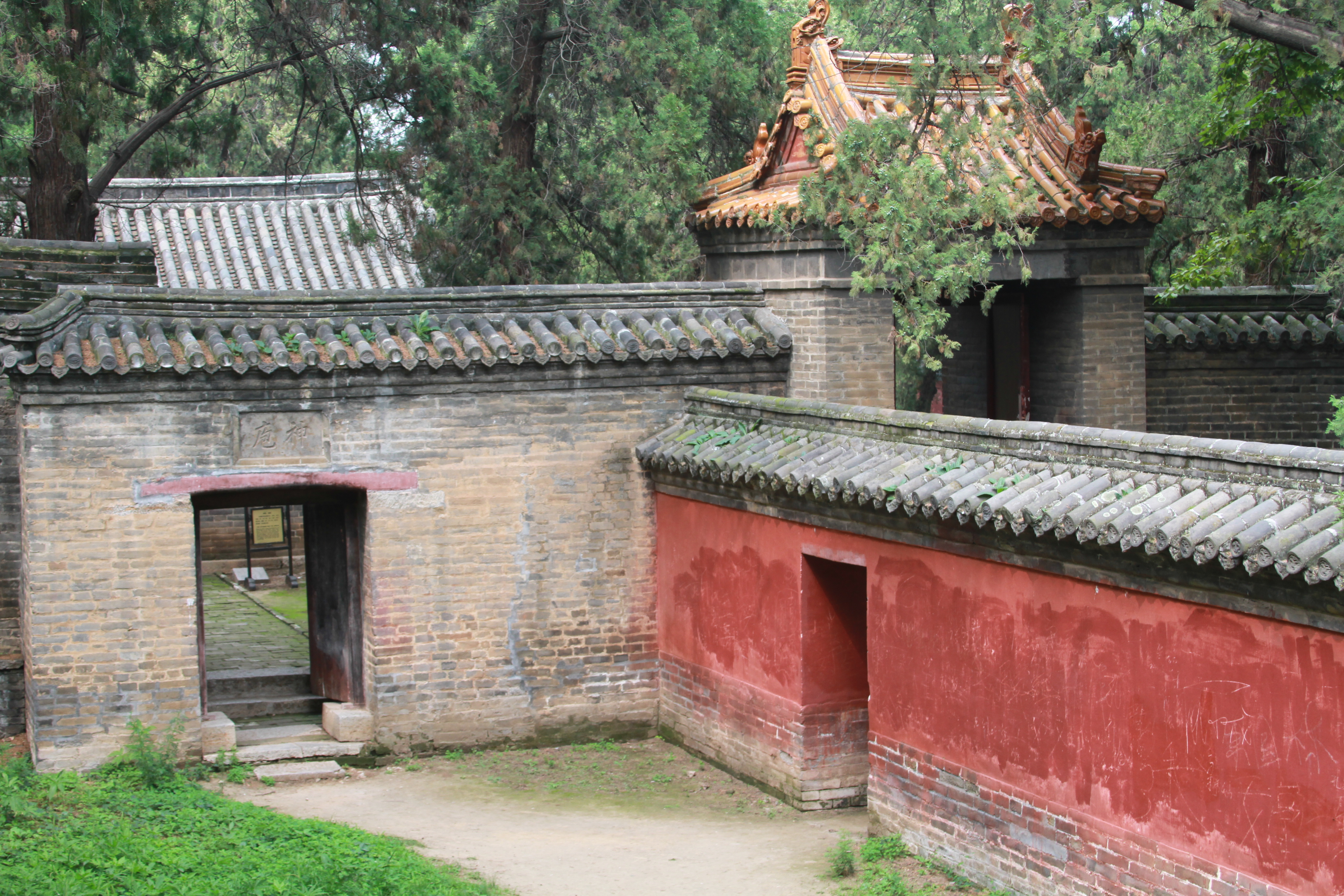
- Fangshan Tombs 防山墓群 (1-121)
- Weijia Tombs 韦家墓群 (1-122)
- Jiangcun Old Tomb 姜村古墓 (1-123)
- Jiulongshan Cliff Tombs 九龙山崖墓群 (1-124)
- Meng mu lun Tombs 孟母林墓群 (1-125)
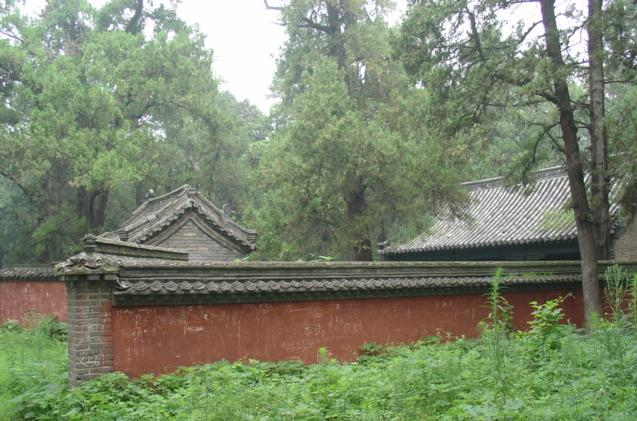
- Shaohao Pyramid 少昊陵 (1-126)
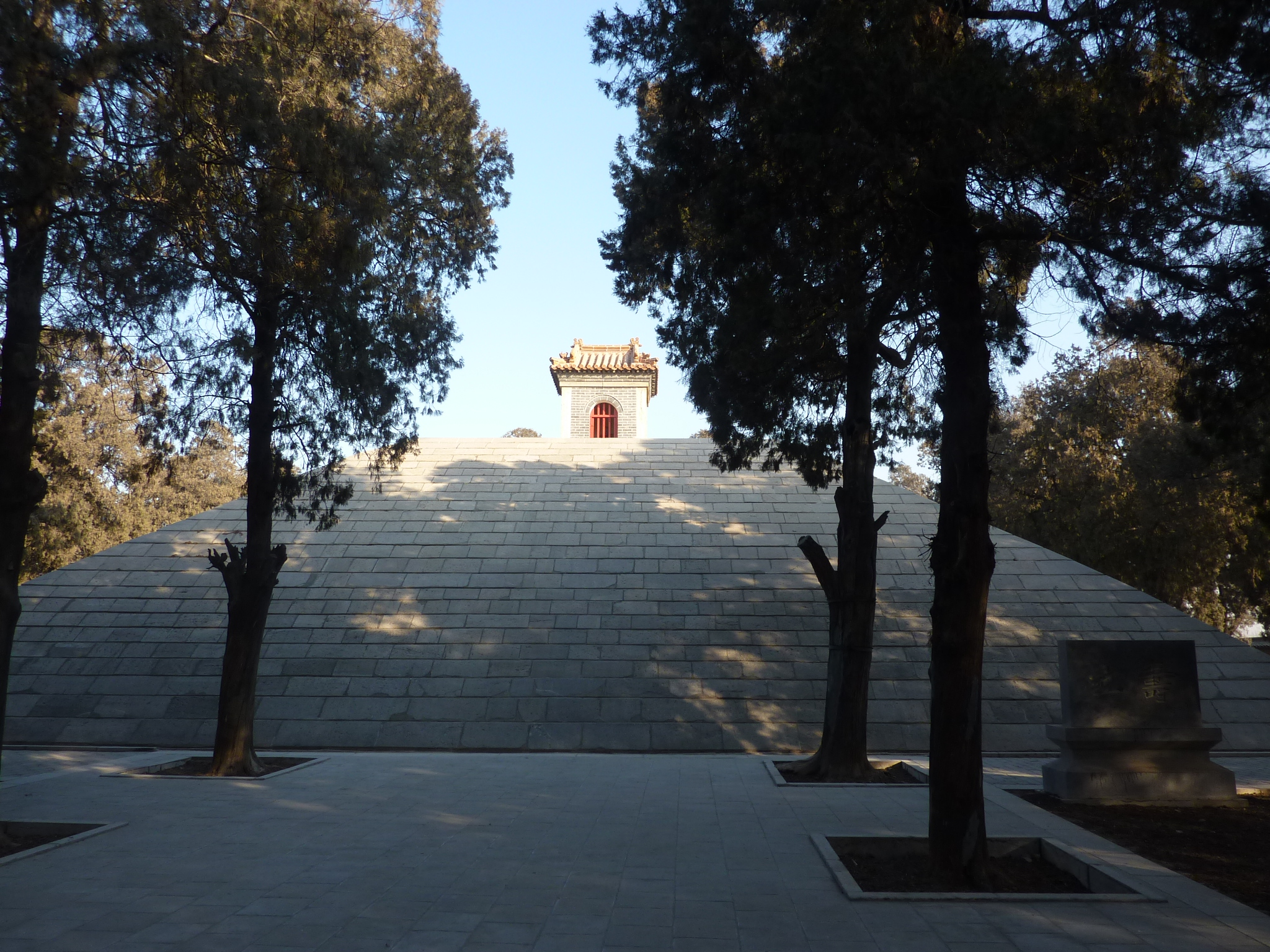
- Anqiu Royal Tombs 安丘王墓群 (1-127)
- Zhusi shuyuan 洙泗书院 (2-41)
- Liang gong lin Tombs 梁公林墓群 (2-224)
- Shaohao ling Ruins 少昊陵遗址 (3-19)
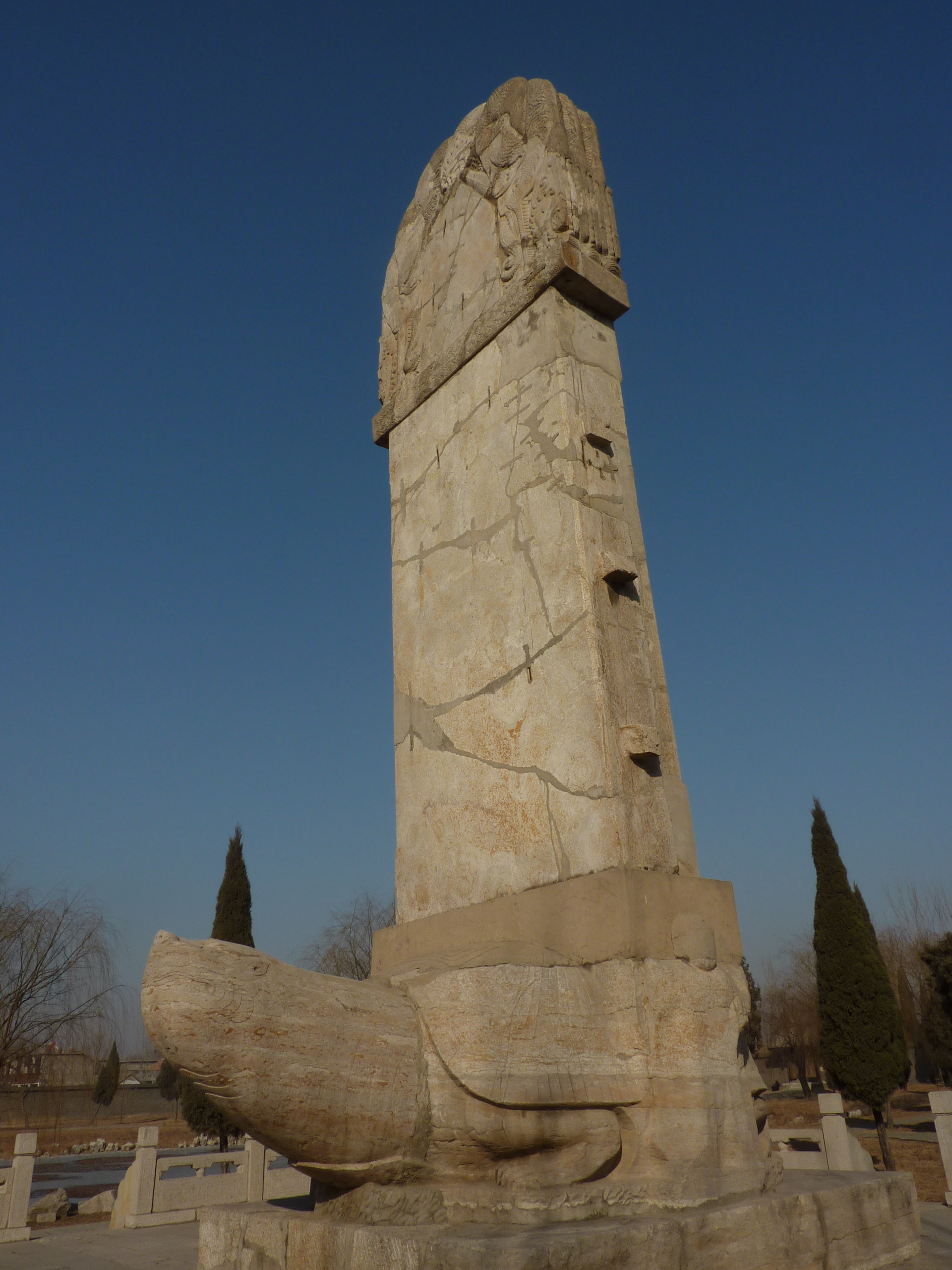
- Xixia hou Ruins 西夏侯遗址 (3-20)
- Xianyuan cian gucheng 仙源县故城 (3-93)
- Tomb of Lin Fang 林放墓 (3-105) (Lin Fang)
- Dongyanlin 东颜林 (3–106)
- Jiuxian Shan jianzhuqun 九仙山建筑群 (3–182)
- Qufu Ming gucheng chenglou 曲阜明故城城楼 (3–183)
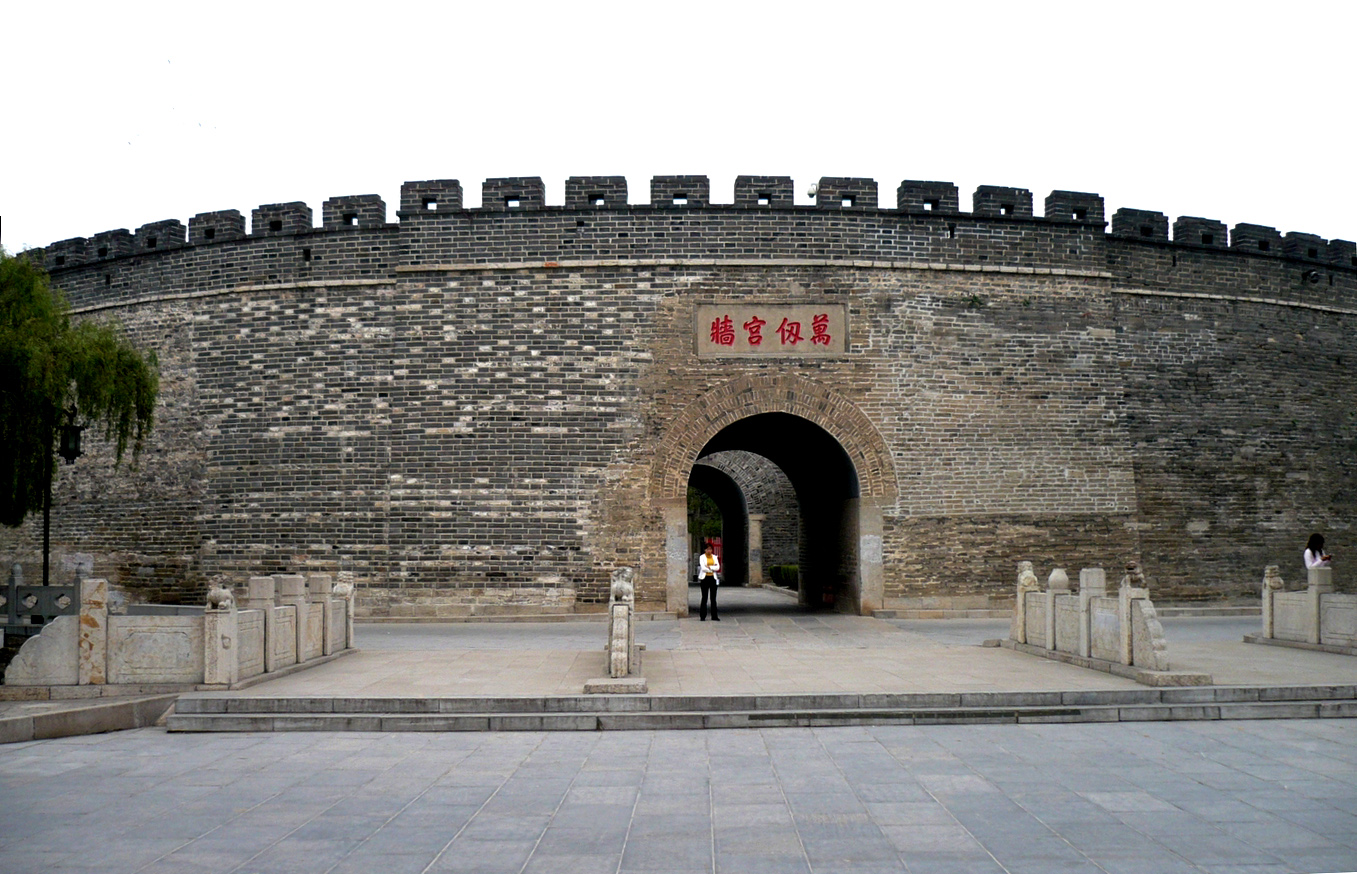
- Siji Shan Guanyin Temple 四基山观音庙 (3–184)
- Shimen Temple jianzhu qun 石门寺建筑群 (3–210)
- Jiulong shan 九龙山摩崖造像石刻 (3–233)
- Qushi litang ji jiaoxue lou han kaopeng 曲师礼堂及教学楼含考棚 (3–254)

==== Yanzhou ====
- Xinglong Pagoda 兴隆塔 (1-50)

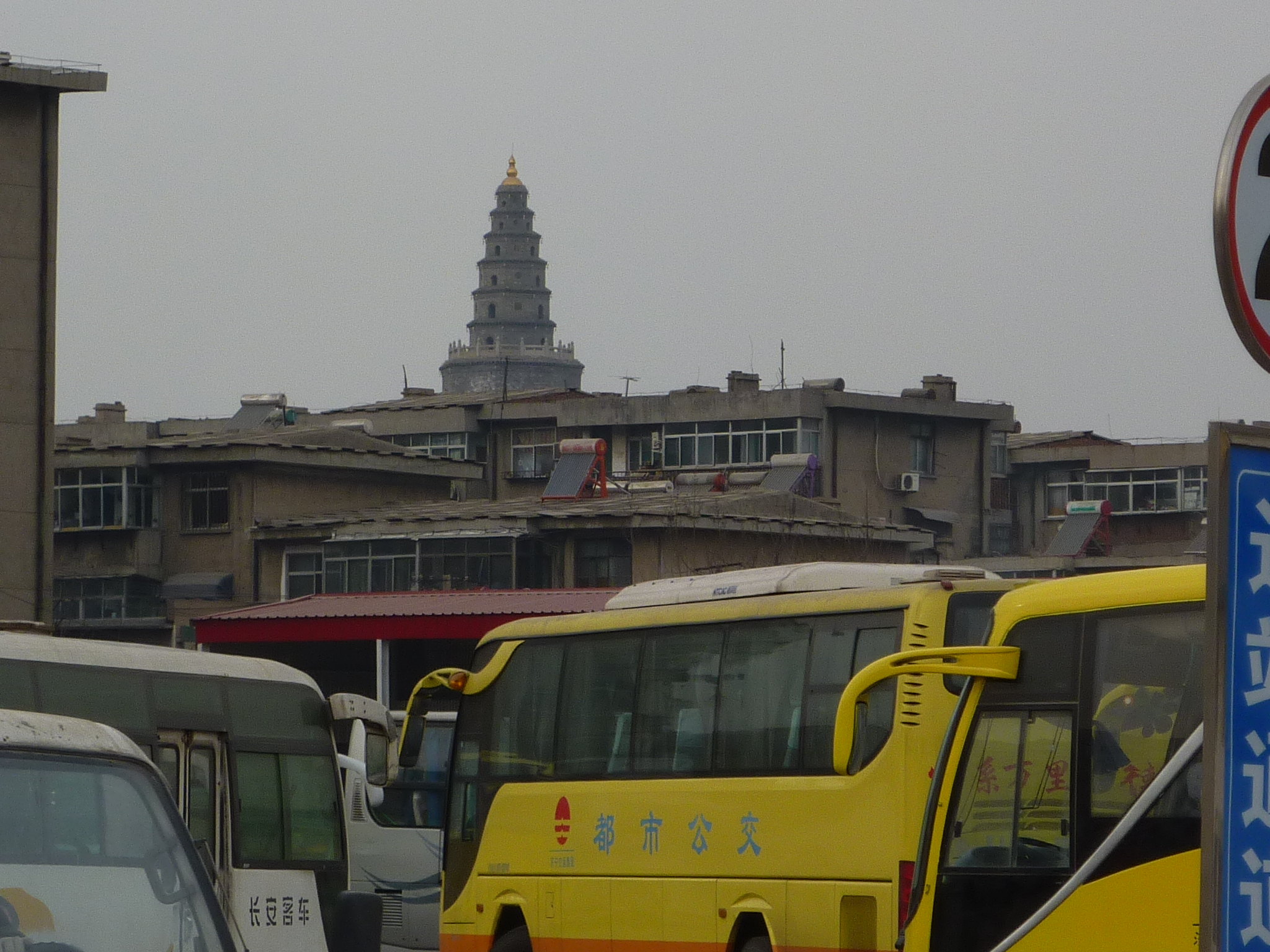

- Xiwu Temple Ruins 西吴寺遗址 (1-76)
- Dongdun cun Ruins 东顿村遗址 (2–201)
- Jinkouba 金口坝 (2-47)
- Xisangyuan Ruins 西桑园遗址 (2-96)
- Wangyin Ruins 王因遗址 (2-97)
- Zhengshi zhuangyuan 郑氏庄园 (3–209)
- Yanzhou Catholic Church 兖州天主教堂 (3–239)

==== Zoucheng ====
- Tieshan moya Stele 铁山摩崖刻石 (1-36)
- Temple of Mencius 孟庙 (1-44)

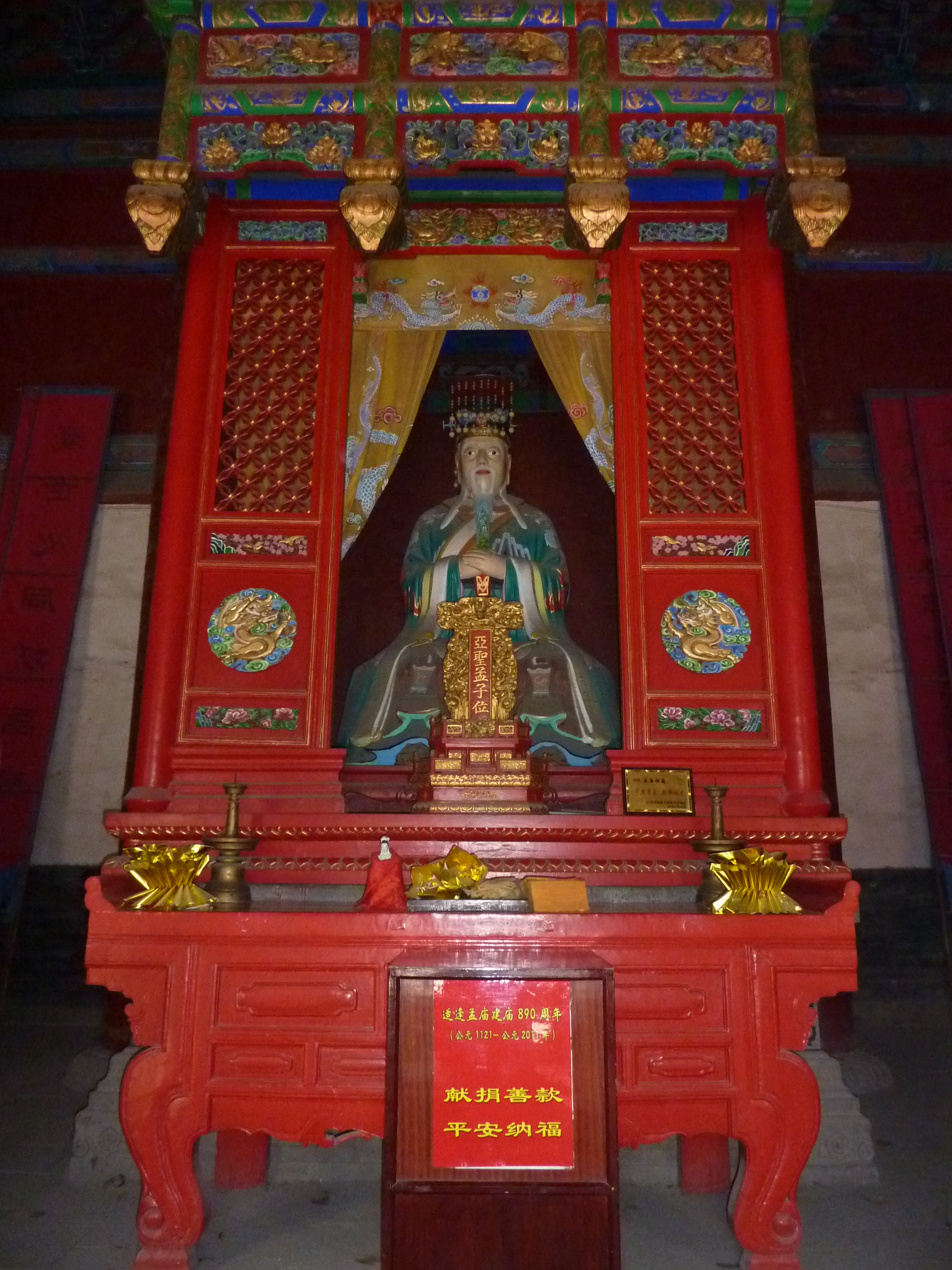

- Yedian Ruins 野店遗址 (1-73)
- Zhuguo gucheng 邾国故城 (1-77)
- Siji Shan Cliff Tombs 四基山崖墓群 (1–120)
- Yishan moya Steles 峄山摩崖石刻群 (2-20)
- Qinücheng Ruins 漆女城遗址 (2–120)
- Mencius Cemetery 孟林 (2–225)
- Mingluwang Tombs 明鲁王墓群 (2–247)
- Zhongxing Pagoda 重兴塔 (3–140)
- Meng mu san qian Ancestral Hall 孟母三迁祠 (3–214)
- Fenghuang Shan shiku Statue 凤凰山石窟造像 (3–232)
- Fu shan xi huang Temple Ruins 凫山羲皇庙遗址 (3-94)

==== Yutai ====
- Qixiadui Ruins 栖霞堆遗址 (2–176)
- Wudangting Ruins 武棠亭遗址 (2–192)
- Tomb of Fan Chi 樊迟墓 (3–104)
- Yutai Kongmiao dadian 鱼台孔庙大殿 (3–211)

==== Jinxiang ====
- Yangshan zhandou jiniandi 羊山战斗纪念地 (2–6)
- Minchengdui yicheng 缗城堆遗址 (2–177)
- Yushandui Ruins 鱼山堆遗址 (2–193)
- Guangshan Temple Pagoda 光善寺塔 (3–134)
- Jinxiangjie xiaofang 金乡节孝坊 (3–213)

==== Jiaxiang ====
- Jianshan Cliff Tomb 尖山崖墓 (1–129)
- Zengzi Temple 曾子庙 (2-44)
- Tomb of Xi Jian 郗鉴墓 (2–243)
- Jiaoguo gucheng Ruins 焦国故城遗址 (3-67)
- Tomb of Zengzi 曾子墓 (3–102)
- Qingshan Temple 青山寺 (3–147)
- Caoshi Jia Ancestral Hall 曹氏家祠 (3–185)
- Yueshi Jia Ancestral Hall 岳氏家祠 (3–212)

==== Weishan ====
- Weishandao Old Tomb 微山岛古墓 (1–130)
- Yinwa Ruins 尹洼遗址 (2–121)
- Fu Xi Temple 伏羲庙 (2-42)
- Zhongzi Temple 仲子庙 (2-43)

==== Wenshang ====
- Shuinia Shan moya Stele 水牛山摩崖石刻 (2–19)
- Wenshang zhuan Pagoda 汶上砖塔 (1-49)
- Mao jia dui Old Tombs 茅家堆古墓群 (2–237)
- Nan wang fen shui Dragon King Temple 南旺分水龙王庙 (2-45)
- Jia Bai Ruins 贾柏遗址 (2-83)
- Wenshang Confucian Temple 汶上文庙 (3–137)
- Wenshang Guandi Temple 汶上关帝庙 (3–154)
- Chi you zhong 蚩尤冢 (3-98)

==== Sishui ====
- Ka Bridge 卞桥 (1-51)
- Ming lu hui wang 明鲁惠王、恭王、端王墓 (2–248)
- Tianqi miao Ruins 天齐庙遗址 (3-37)
- Yinjia cheng Ruins 尹家城遗址 (3-49)

==== Liangshan ====
- Qingdui Ruins 青堆遗址 (2–122)
- Faxing Temple Ruins baokuo Liantai Stele, Donglu Xizhu chan shi muta, Wenli tang 法兴寺遗址包括莲台石刻、东鲁西竺禅师墓塔、问礼堂 (3-89)

=== Tai'an ===
==== Taishan ====
- Jingshiyu, Wuzibei ji moya Stele 经石峪、无字碑及摩崖刻石 (1-34)
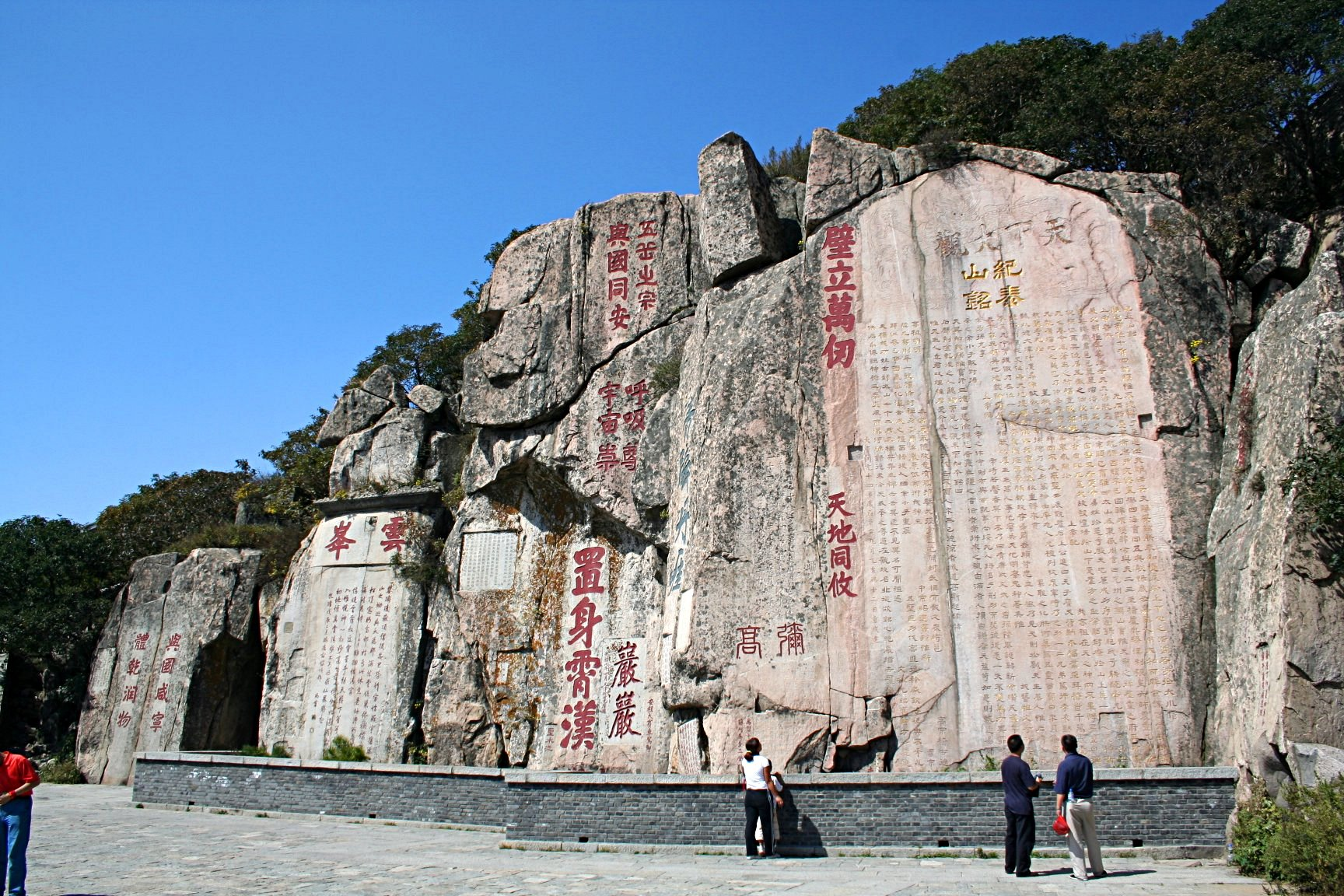
- Tiankuang dian ji bihua 天贶殿及壁画 (1-41)
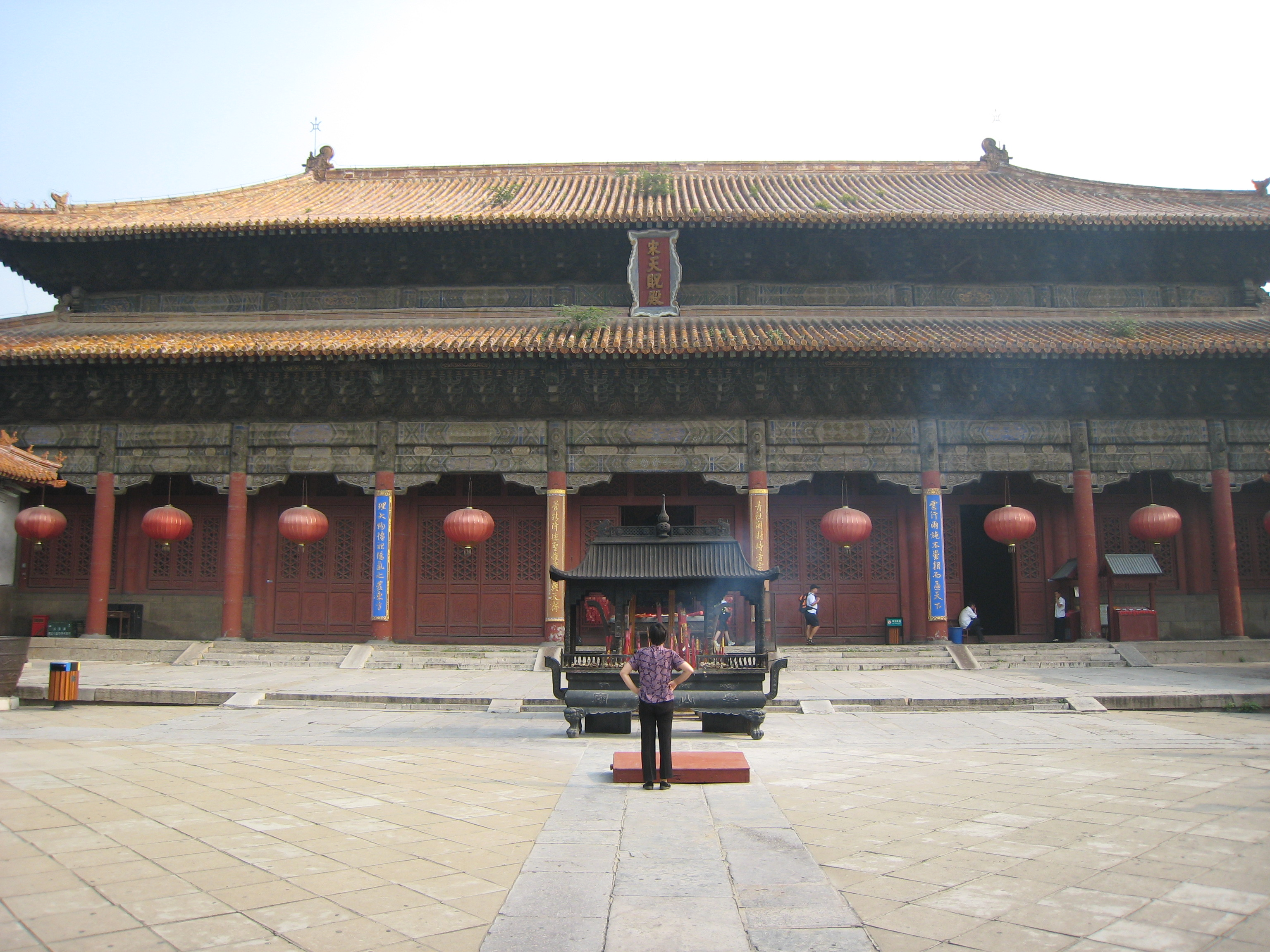
- Taishan Bixia Ancestral Hall 碧霞祠 (1-42)
- Taishan Panlu ji gu jianzhu qun 泰山盘路及古建筑群 (2-28)
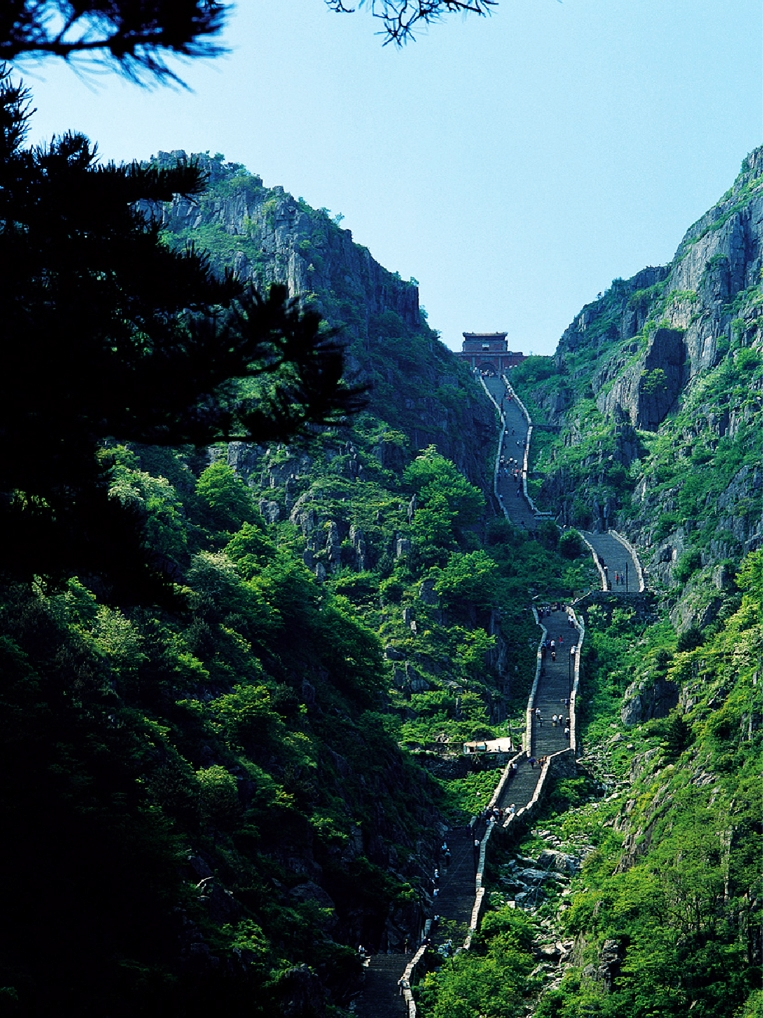

==== Daiyue ====
- Culai Shan geming Ruins 徂徕山革命遗址 (1-09)
- Culai Shan moya Stele 徂徕山摩崖石刻 (2–13)
- Xiao da heng mudi Stele 萧大亨墓地石刻 (2–15)
- Dawenkou site 大汶口遗址 (1-67) 1982年列入第二批全国重点文物保护单位名单
- Wuliang dian 无梁殿 (3–177)
- Shanxi huiguan 山西会馆 (3–178)
- Gushi Bridge 古石桥 (3–179)

==== Xintai ====
- Xintai zhiren huashi didian 新泰智人化石地点 (2-82)
- Xintai shi Zhoujiazhuang Dong Zhou Tombs 新泰市周家庄东周墓群 (3–101)

==== Feicheng ====
- Lufang zhandou Ruins 陆房战斗遗址 (1–10)
- Tai Shan Xianling gong 泰山显灵宫 (3–181)

==== Ningyang ====
- Guci yaozhi 古磁窑址 (1-71)
- Panmaocun Han Tomb 潘茂村汉墓 (1–117)
- Ningyang Yanzi Temple 宁阳颜子庙 (2-29)
- Ningyang Lingshan Temple 宁阳灵山寺 (3–136)
- Ningyang Confucian Temple 宁阳文庙 (3–156)
- Ningyang Yuwang Temple 宁阳禹王庙 (3–180)

==== Dongping ====
- Baifo shan Grotto Statue 白佛山石窟造像 (1-31)
- Dongping gucheng 东平故城 (1-69)
- Beiqiao Tombs 北桥墓群 (1–118)
- Liangshi Tombs 梁氏墓群 (1–119)
- Sili Shan Stele Statue 司里山石刻造像 (2–12)
- Limingwo Cliff Statue 理明窝摩崖造像 (2–14)
- Daicunba 戴村坝 (2-30)

=== Weihai ===
==== Huancui ====
- Beiyang shuishi tidu shu 北洋水师提督署 (1-56)
- Yihe Ruins 义和遗址 (2–100)
- Datiandong Tombs 大天东墓群 (2–232)
- Kuanrenyuan Site 宽仁院旧址 (2-75)
- Weihai Yingguo lingshiguan Site 威海英国领事馆旧址 (2-76)
- Gongji fenhui Site 共济分会旧址 (3–240)
- Kanglai fandian Site 康来饭店旧址 (3–241)
- Yingguo gongcheng shizhizhai Site 英国工程师住宅旧址 (3–242)
- Yingguo haijun shangjiang bieshu Site 英国海军上将别墅旧址 (3–243)
- Ying haijun siling bishufang jiuzhi Siyin Building 英海军司令避暑房旧址四眼楼 (3–244)
- Ying shang siren zhuzhai jiuzhi Xiaohong Building 英商私人住宅旧址小红楼 (3–245)
- Zhengliusuo Site 蒸馏所旧址 (3–246)
- Taimao yanghang Site 泰茂洋行旧址 (3–261)
- Shouhui Weihai wei jinian Pagoda 收回威海卫纪念塔 (3–266)
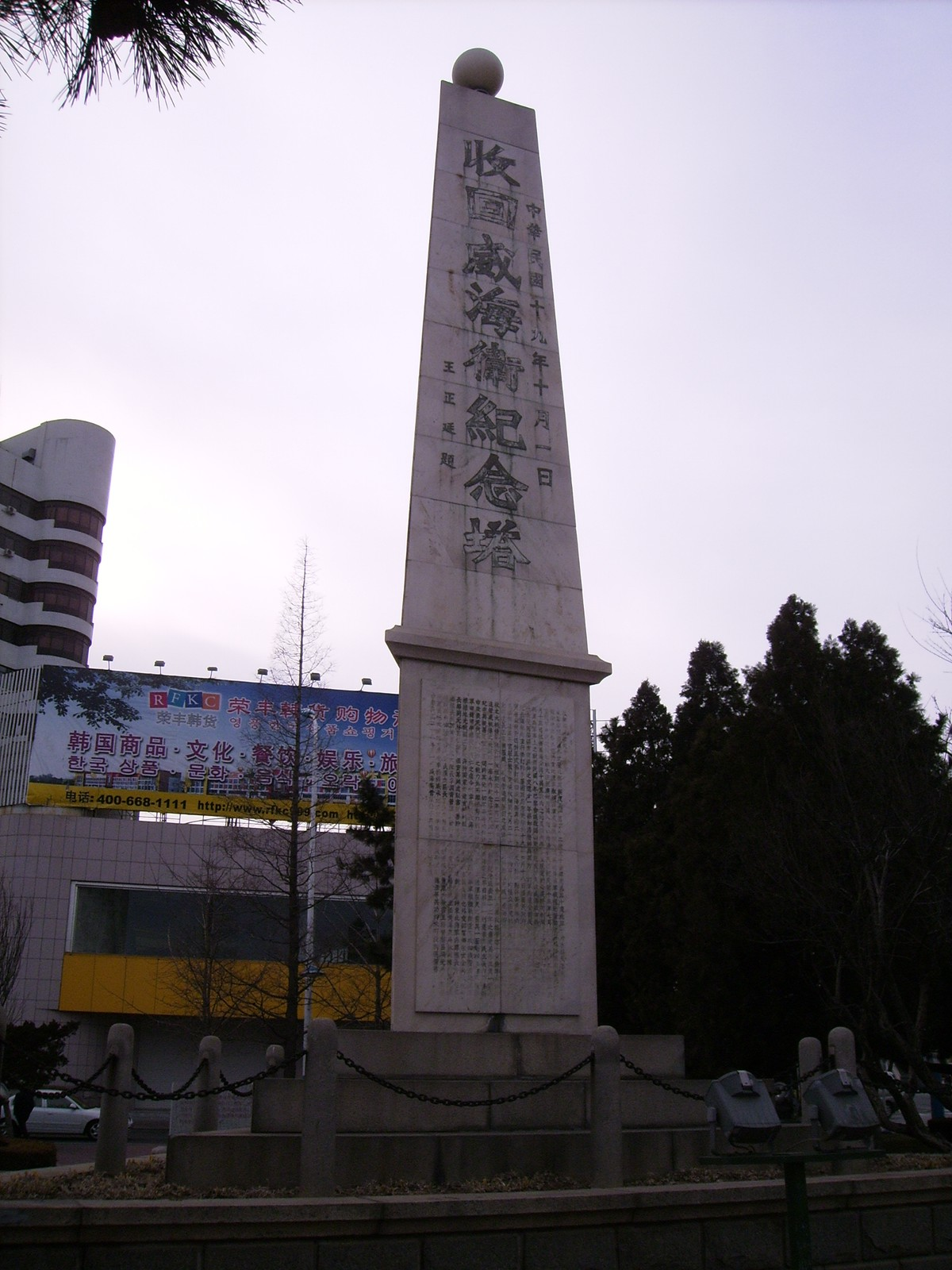
- Haixing xuejiao Site 海星学校旧址 (3–280)
- Meiguo yayi bieshu Site 美国牙医别墅旧址 (3–281)
- Yiren bieshu Site 意人别墅旧址 (3–282)
- Ying shang bieshu Site 英商别墅旧址 (3–283)

==== Fushan (乳山市) ====
- Shengshuiyan Stele Statue 圣水岩石刻造像 (2-26)
- Xiaoguan Ruins 小管遗址 (2–152)
- Nanhuangzhuang Tombs 南黄庄墓群 (2–217)

==== Wendeng ====
- Tianfushan geming Ruins 天福山革命遗址 (1-21)
- Shengjing shan moya Stele 圣经山摩崖石刻 (2-25)
- Shali dian Ruins 沙里店遗址 (1-94)
- Dasongjia Ruins 大宋家遗址 (2–102)
- Maitian Ruins 脉田遗址 (2–103)
- Xinquan Tombs 新权墓群 (2–233)
- Shiyang Han Tombs 石羊汉墓群 (3–118)

==== Rongcheng ====
- Cha shan qian zhen dong shie ke 槎山千真洞石刻 (2-24)
- Hekou Ruins 河口遗址 (2–101)
- Chengshantou Ruins 成山头遗址 (2–209)

=== Rizhao ===
==== Donggang ====
- Donghaiyu Ruins 东海峪遗址 (1-84)
- Sujia Ruins 苏家遗址 (2–138)

==== Lanshan ====
- Yao wangcheng Ruins 尧王城遗址 (1-86)
- Xiao dai tuan Ruins 小代疃遗址 (2–167)

==== Wulian ====
- Dongjiaying Ruins 董家营遗址 (3-25)
- Dantu Ruins 丹土遗址 (1-99)
- Dongchengxian Ruins 东城仙遗址 (2–116)
- Dinggongshi Ancestral Hall 丁公石祠 (2-35)
- Wulianshan Guangming Temple 五莲山光明寺 (3–176)
- Pai gucheng Ruins 牌孤城遗址 (3-75)

==== Ju ====
- Liu Xie guju 刘勰故居 (1-54)
- Yingguo gucheng 莒国故城 (1-87)
- Qijiazhuang Tombs 齐家庄墓群 (1–135)
- Lingyanghe Ruins 陵阳河遗址 (2–128)
- Dazhucun Ruins 大朱村遗址 (2–129)
- Hangtou Ruins 杭头遗址 (2–137)
- Tangzi Ruins 塘子遗址 (2–182)
- Tianjingwang Tombs 天井汪墓群 (2–226)
- Chengyang Royal Tomb 城阳王墓 (2–239)

==== Rizhao ... ====
Rizhao jingji kaifaqu 日照经济开发区

- Liangcheng zhen Ruins 两城镇遗址 (1-85)

=== Laiwu ===
==== Laicheng ====
- Gu ye tong Ruins 古冶铜遗址 (1-70)
- Wangyang tai 汪洋台 (2–8)
- Mucheng Ruins 牟城遗址 (2–188)
- Xiao bei ye ye tie Ruins 小北冶冶铁遗址 (2–216)
- Ying cheng Ruins 嬴城遗址 (3-66)
- Cai jia zhen jingchuang 蔡家镇经幢 (3–231)

==== Gangcheng ====
- Laiwu zhanyi zhihuisuo Site 莱芜战役指挥所旧址 (1–18)

=== Linyi ===
==== Lanshan ====
- Linyi geming lieshi lingyuan 临沂革命烈士陵园 (1–17)
- Yinqueshan, Jinqueshan Tombs 银雀山、金雀山墓群 (1–133) (Yinqueshan)
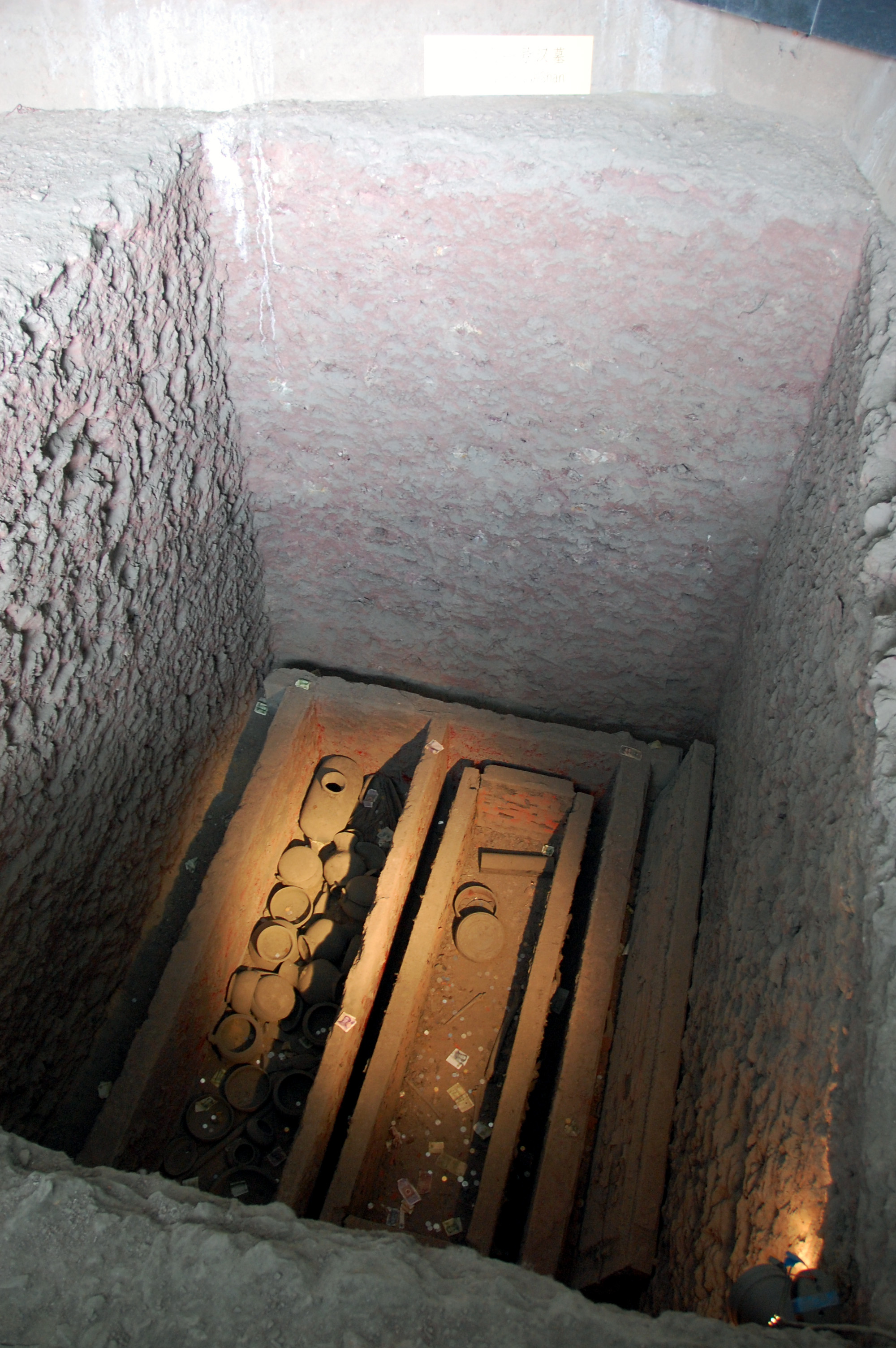
- Linyi Confucius Temple 临沂孔庙 (2-77)
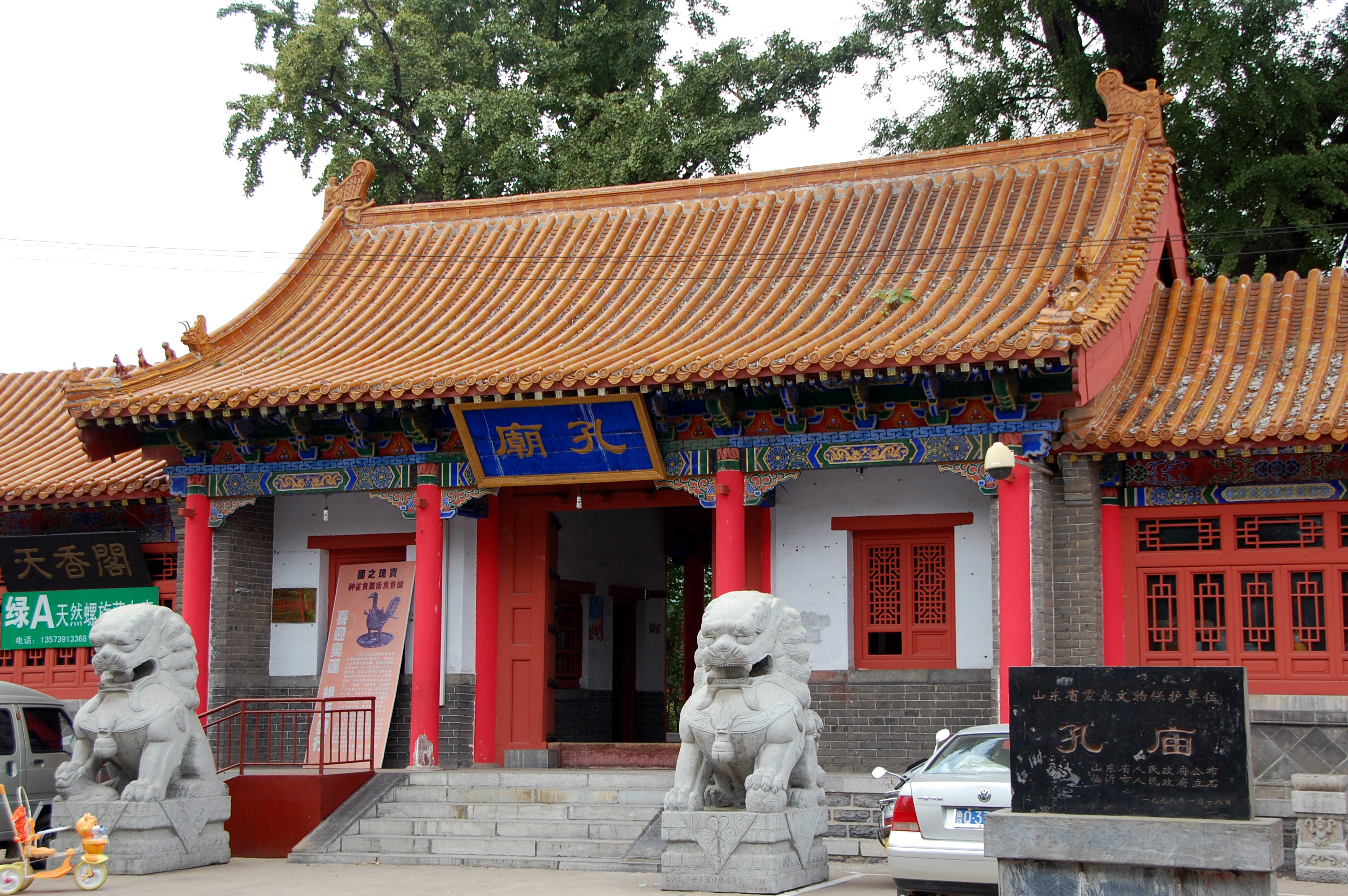
- Wangjiasangang Ruins 王家三岗遗址 (2–125)
- Xiaochenghou Ruins 小城后遗址 (2–126)
- Gucheng Ruins 故城遗址 (2–179)
- Xiaogucheng gucheng 小谷城故城 (3-45)
- Jiqiu gucheng 即邱故城 (3-65)
- Zhongqiu gucheng zhu ge cheng 中丘故城诸葛城 (3-72)
- Wang Xizhi guli Ruins 王羲之故里遗址 (3-85) (Wang Xizhi)

==== Luozhuang ====
- Yan jia dun Ruins 晏驾墩遗址 (3–15)
- Zhu chen gu ciyao zhi 朱陈古瓷窑址 (3-86)
- Wubaizhuang huaxiang Stone Tomb 吴白庄画像石墓 (3–227)

==== Hedong ====
- Quanshangtun Ruins 泉上屯遗址 (2-84)
- Qingfengling Ruins 青峰岭遗址 (2-85)
- Zhuqiu gucheng xian gucheng 祝丘故城故县故城 (3-51)
- Xiaohuangshan Tombs 小皇山墓群 (3–100)
- Xin sijun junbu Site 新四军军部旧址 (3–274)

==== Yinan ====
- Kangda yi fenjiai Site 抗大一分校旧址 (1–16)
- Daqingshan zhandou Site 大青山战斗遗址 (1–19)
- Shandong sheng zhanshi gongzuo wei yuanhui Site 山东省战时工作委员会旧址 (1-20)
- Beizhai huaxiang Stone Tombs 北寨画像石墓群 (1–132)
- Xisima Ruins 西司马遗址 (2–127)
- Xinliang Bridge 信量桥 (3–142)
- Yangdu gucheng 阳都故城 (3-63)

==== Tancheng ====
- Maling Shan Ruins 马陵山遗址 (3–17)
- Tanguo gucheng 郯国故城 (1-88)
- Heilongtan Ruins 黑龙潭遗址 (2-86)
- Tomb of Lord Yu 于公墓 (3–117)
- Matou Mosque 马头清真寺 (3–191)

==== Yishui ====
- Zhong-gong Zhongyang Shandong fenbuju jiuzhi 中共中央山东分局旧址 (2–3)
- Dazhong Daily Newspaper chuangkan di 《大众日报》创刊地 (2–4)
- Great Wall of Qi 齐长城遗址 (1-89)
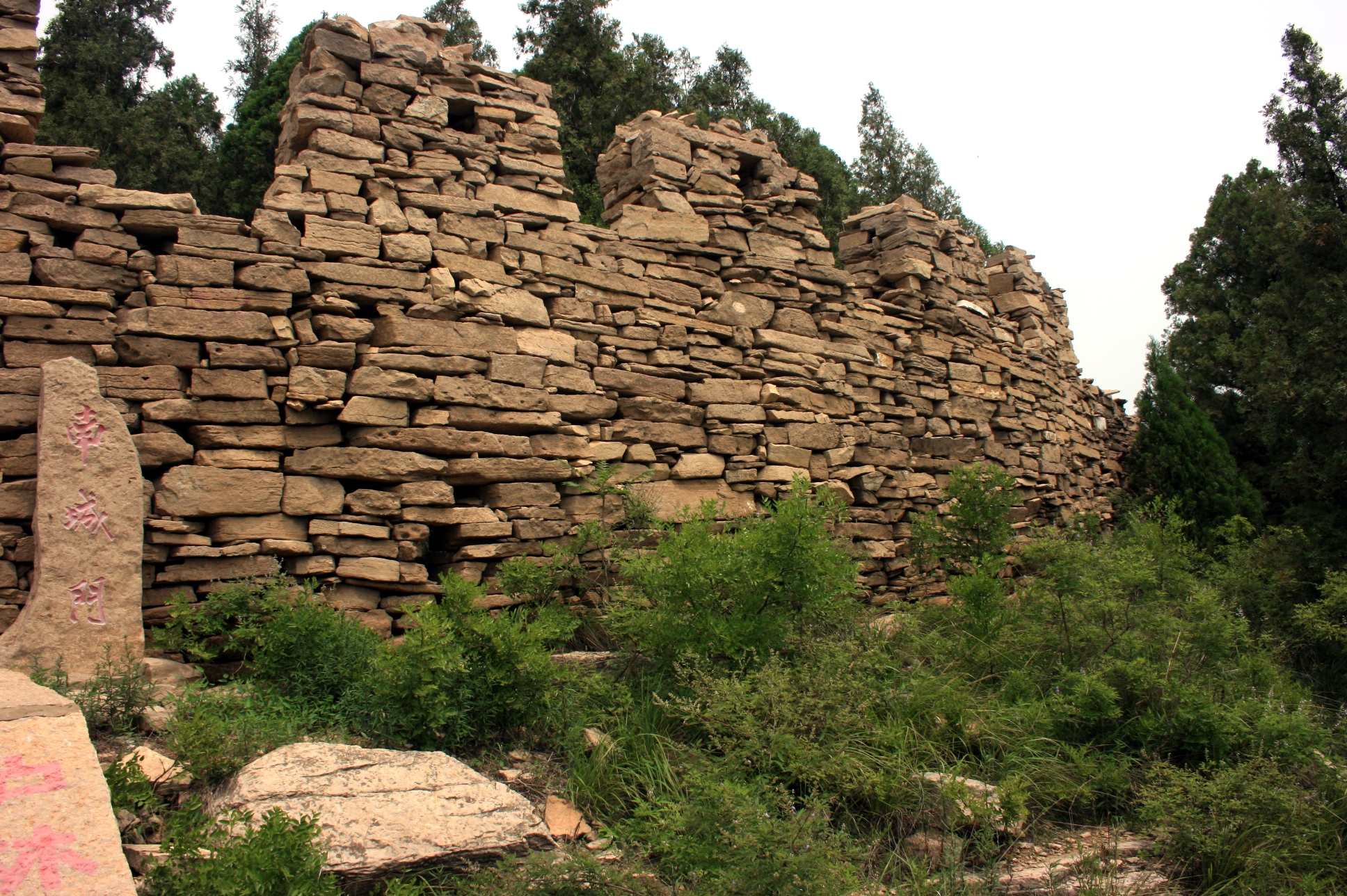
- Guziding Ruins 姑子顶遗址 (3-53)
- Taitou Ruins 抬头遗址 (3-56)

==== Cangshan ====
- Cengguo gucheng 鄫国故城 (1-90)
- Lanling Old Tomb 兰陵古墓 (1–134)
- Lunan lieshi lingyuan 鲁南烈士陵园 (2–5)
- Xiangcheng Ruins 向城遗址 (2-98)
- Yuguanzhuang Ruins 于官庄遗址 (2-99)
- Xiaohu Ruins 小湖遗址 (2–132)
- Donggaoyao Ruins 东高尧遗址 (3-44)
- Zuocheng gucheng 柞城故城 (3-50)
- Jinshan Han Tombs 金山汉墓群 (3–116)
- Zhuangwu Paifang 庄坞牌坊 (3–221)

==== Fei ====
- Xi xi jiang Ruins 西西蒋遗址 (2–133)
- Fei xian gucheng zhi 费县故城址 (2–205)
- Liujia tuan Tombs 刘家疃墓群 (2–240)
- Fangcheng gucheng Ruins 防城故城遗址 (3-52)

==== Pingyi ====
- Gong cao que, Huang sheng qing que 功曹阙、皇圣卿阙 (1-53)
- Tongshi Ruins 铜石遗址 (2–134)
- Beichi Ruins 北池遗址 (2–135)
- Zhuanyu gu chengzhi 颛臾故城址 (2–204)
- Cai zhuang Ruins 蔡庄遗址 (3-42)
- Nanwu cheng gucheng 南武城故城 (3-73)
- Zuo baogui yi-guanzhong 左宝贵衣冠冢 (3–127)

==== Junan ====
- Xuejiayao Ruins 薛家窑遗址 (2–130)
- Qian sha gou Ruins 前沙沟遗址 (原崔家沙沟)(3–16)
- Wang jing yu feng lin 王璟御封林 (3–237)
- Shandong sheng zhengfu Site 山东省政府旧址 (3–286)
- Shandong Xinhua shudian Site 山东新华书店旧址 (3–287)

==== Mengyin ====
- Daigu geming Ruins 岱崮革命遗址 (1–14)
- Menglianggu zhanyi Ruins 孟良崮战役遗址 (1–15)
- Lüjiazhuang Ruins 吕家庄遗址 (2–136)
- Beilou ying xian Bridge 北楼迎仙桥 (3–192)

==== Linshu ====
- Beigoutou Ruins 北沟头遗址 (1-83)
- Guojiashan Ruins 郭家山遗址 (2–131)
- Chenguanzhuang Ruins 陈官庄遗址 (3-69)

=== Dezhou ===
==== Decheng ====
- Sulu Royal Tomb 苏禄王墓 (1–145)

==== Leling ====
- Wuli zhong Ruins 五里冢遗址 (1–113)
- Huiwang zhong Ruins 惠王冢遗址 (2–173)
- Sannü zhong 三女冢 (2–230)
- Yeling Confucian Temple 乐陵文庙 (3–172)

==== Yucheng ====
- Yuwang ting Ruins 禹王亭遗址 (1–114)
- Doujia Ruins 窦冢遗址 (2–174)

==== Ling ====
- Shentou Tombs 神头墓群 (1–144)

==== Qihe ====
- Yitun Ruins 尹屯遗址 (2–175)
- Fengli Han Tomb 冯李汉墓 (3–114)

==== Pingyuan ====
- Zhuzhuang Tombs 朱庄墓群 (2–231)

=== Liaocheng ===
==== Dongchangfu ====
- Liaocheng Iron Pagoda 聊城铁塔 (1-60)
- Guangyue Building 光岳楼 (1-61)
- Shan-Shaan Meeting Hall 山陕会馆 (1-62)
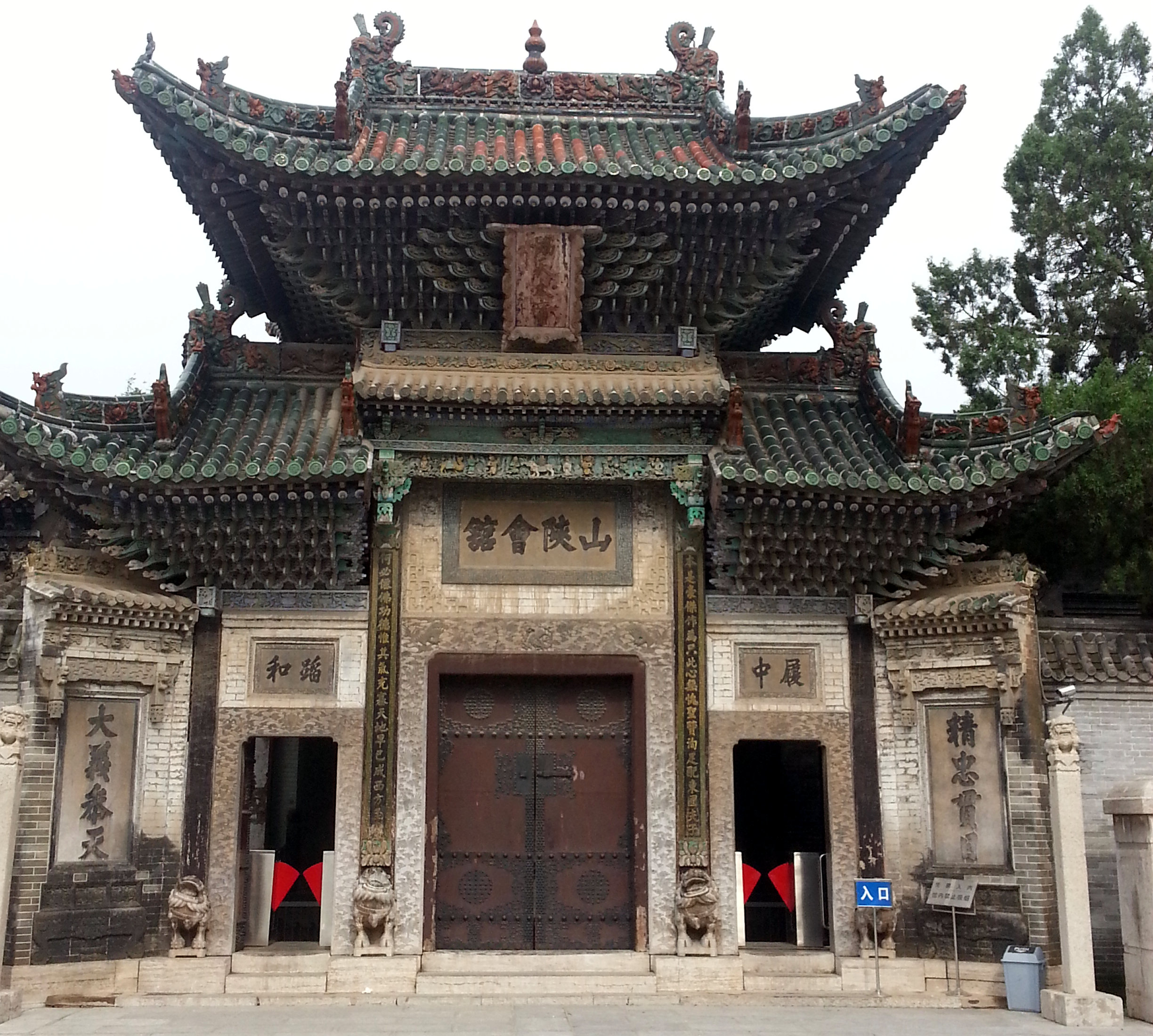
- Quan Temple Ruins 权寺遗址 (2–172)
- Houtugu Han Tomb 堠土固汉墓 (3–115)
- Tangyi Confucian Temple 堂邑文庙 (3–151)
- Fu shi Ancestral Hall 傅氏祠堂 (3–201)
- Haiyuan Pavilion 海源阁 (3–202)

==== Linqing ====
- Ao tou ji 鏊头矶 (2-49)
- Linqing Western Mosque 临清西清真寺 (2-50)
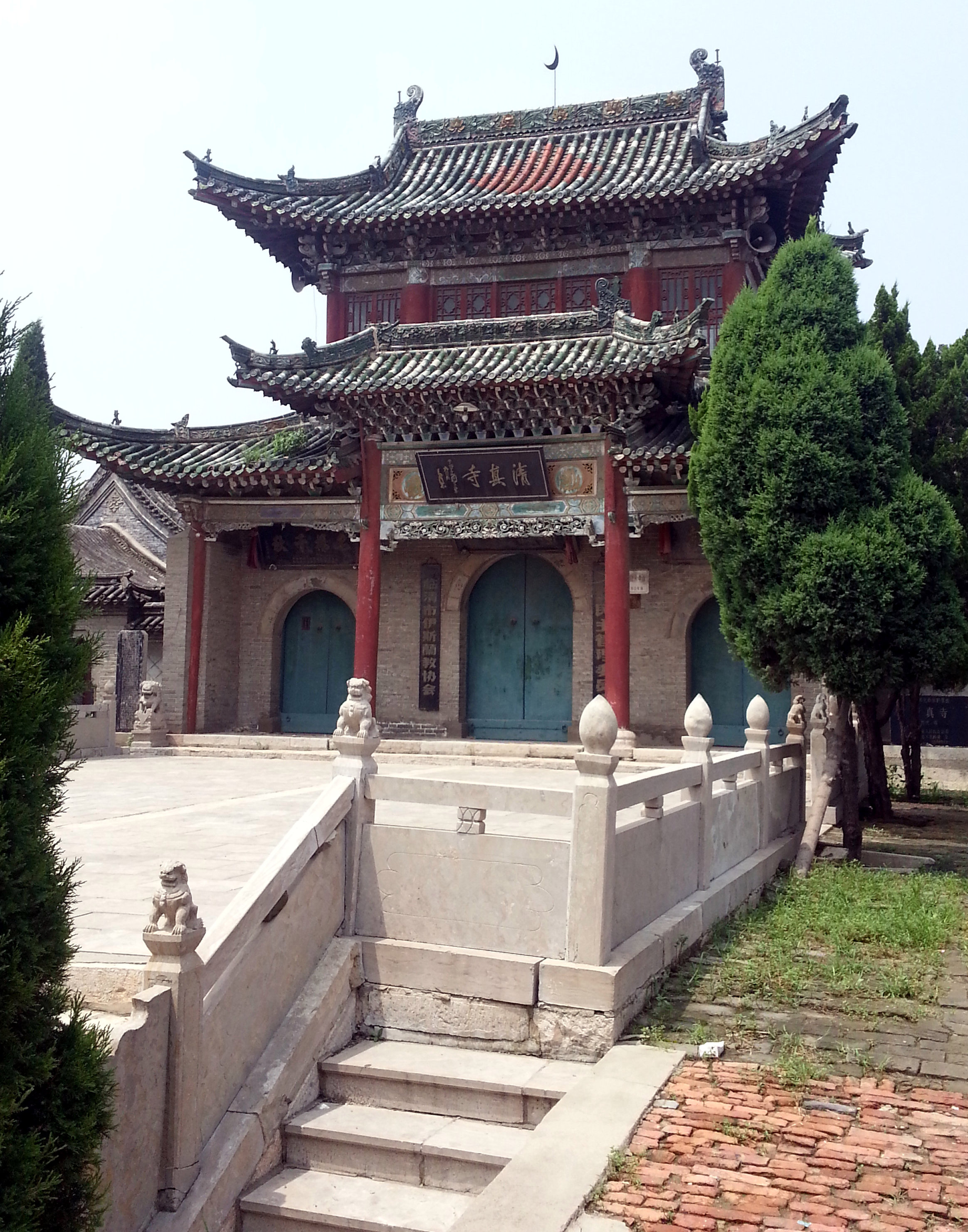
- Linqing sheli bao Pagoda 临清舍利宝塔 (2-51)
- Linqing He wie zhang zhuang ming, Qing zhuan yao Ruins 临清河隈张庄明、清砖窑遗址 (3-96)
- Linqing Eastern Mosque 临清清真东寺 (3–167)
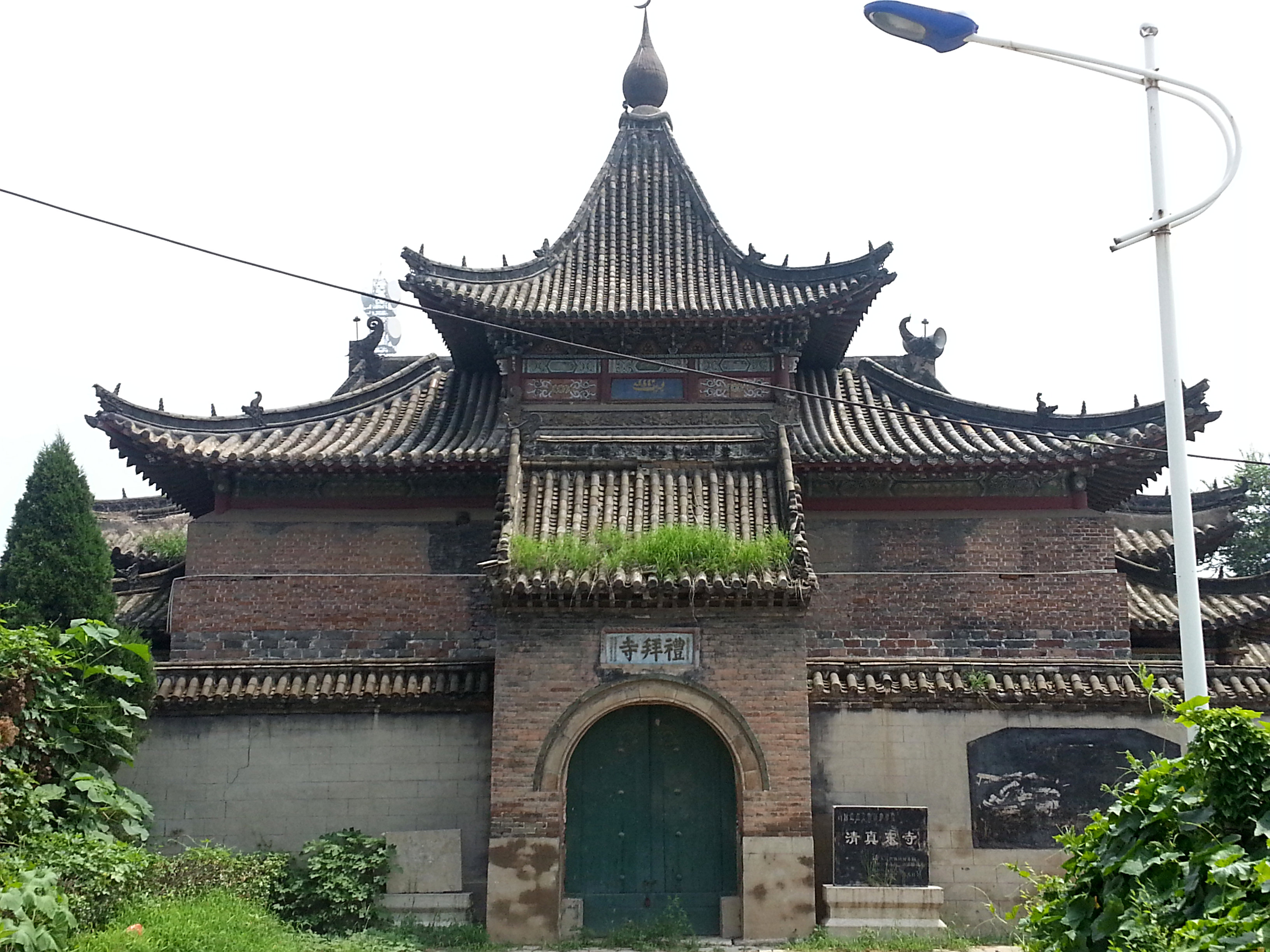
- Linqing minju 临清民居 (3–190)

==== Gaotang ====
- Hehe Tombs 涸河墓群 (2–241)
- Liangcun Xingguo Temple Pagoda 梁村兴国寺塔 (3–141)
- Gaotang Confucian Temple 高唐文庙 (3–153)

==== Yanggu ====
- Jingyanggang Ruins 景阳岗遗址 (1–111)
- Hongdui Ruins 红堆遗址 (2–142)
- Huanggu zhong Ruins 皇姑冢遗址 (2–143)
- A cheng gu chengzhi 阿城故城址 (2–206)
- Yanggu Confucian Temple 阳谷文庙 (3–145)
- Boji Bridge 博济桥 (3–165)
- Haihui Temple han yanyunsi 海会寺含盐运司 (3–204)
- Poli Church 坡里教堂 (3–205)

==== Chiping ====
- Zhangjia lou Kang-Ri Site 张家楼抗日遗址 (1-28)
- Shangzhuang Ruins 尚庄遗址 (1–109)
- Taizigao Ruins 台子高遗址 (1–110)
- Jiao chang pu Ruins 教场铺遗址 (2–141)
- Nanchen Ruins 南陈遗址 (3–5)

==== Shen ====
- Hanshi mudi Stele 韩氏墓地石刻 (2-23)
- Mengwa Ruins and Han Tombs 孟洼遗址含汉墓群 (3-82)
- Shenxian Xiangzhang Ruins 莘县相庄遗址 (3-87)
- Shenxian Confucian Temple 莘县文庙 (3–166)

==== Dong'e ====
- Tomb of Caozhi 曹植墓 (2–242)
- Qian Zhao Ruins 前赵遗址 (3–6)
- Deng miao Han huaxiangshi Tomb 邓庙汉画像石墓 (3–113)
- Jingjue Temple 净觉寺 (3–168)
- Weizhuang Stone Paifang 魏庄石牌坊 (3–203)

==== Guan ====
- Xiaocheng Old Ruins 肖城古遗址 (3-97)
- Wuxun mu ji Ancestral Hall 武训墓及祠堂 (3–125)
- Nanjie minju Zhang Menggeng guju 南街民居张梦庚故居 (3–255)

=== Binzhou ===
==== Bincheng ====
- Lanjia Ruins 兰家遗址 (1–107)

==== Zouping ====
- Baojia Ruins 鲍家遗址 (1–103)
- Xinanzhuang Ruins 西南庄遗址 (2-95)
- Dinggong Ruins 丁公遗址 (2–124)
- Tomb of Liang Shuming 梁漱溟墓 (3–289)

==== Zhanhua ====
- Yangjia guyaozhi 杨家古窑址 (1–108)
- Xi Ruins 西遗址 (2–203)

==== Huimin ====
- Wie ji di zhu zhuangyuan 魏集地主庄园 (1-59)
- Dashang Ruins 大商遗址 (1–102)
- Dagai Ruins 大盖遗址 (1–106)
- Lujia Ruins 路家遗址 (2–166)
- Houjia Ruins 郝家遗址 (2–183)

==== Boxing ====
- Zhangbafo 丈八佛 (2–18)
- Fengyang Stone Bridge 凤阳石桥 (2-48)
- Zhaika Ruins 寨卞遗址 (2–163)
- Caigao Ruins 村高遗址 (2–164)
- Licheng Ruins 利城遗址 (2–165)
- Xiancheng Ruins 贤城遗址 (2–186)
- Donglu Ruins 东鲁遗址 (2–187)
- Longhua Temple Ruins 龙华寺遗址 (2–214)
- Yuanzhuang Ruins 院庄遗址 (3-43)

==== Yangxin ====
- Zhangjia jitu jinianshi 张家集土改纪念室 (1-29)
- Niuwangtang Old Tomb 牛王堂古墓 (1–143)
- Xiaohan Ruins 小韩遗址 (2–123)
- Qintai Ruins 秦台遗址 (2–184)
- Bangchuiliu Ruins 棒槌刘遗址 (2–185)

==== Wudi ====
- Guolaiyi Old Tomb 郭莱仪古墓 (1–142)
- Xinyanggu chengzhi 信阳故城址 (2–202)
- Wushifen guju 吴式芬故居 (3–193)
- Dajue Temple 大觉寺 (3–220)

=== Heze ===
==== Mudan ====
- Anqiudui Ruins 安邱堆遗址 (1-81)
- Feng zui tu gu dui Ruins 凤嘴土固堆遗址 (3-70)

==== Juancheng ====
- Lishan gu Ruins 历山古遗址 (3–18)
- Shaoling 尧陵 (3-99)
- Su shu yu shi Paifang 苏述御使牌坊 (3–170)

==== Shan (单县) ====
- Baishoufang, Baishifang 百寿坊、百狮坊 (1-52)
- Zhangtugudui Ruins 张土固堆遗址 (3-41)

==== Yuncheng ====
- Guanyin Temple Pagoda 观音寺塔 (3–135)

==== Cao (曹县) ====
- Hongsancun Kang-Ri lianfang yizhi 红三村抗日联防遗址 (1–13)
- Liangdui Ruins 梁堆遗址 (1-80)
- Anlingdui Ruins 安陵堆遗址 (1-82)
- Shen zhong ji Ruins 莘冢集遗址 (2–139)
- Xidui Ruins 郗堆遗址 (2–140)
- Gaodui Ruins 郜堆遗址 (2–170)

==== Dingtao ====
- Fangshan Tombs 仿山墓群 (1–131)
- Guandui Ruins 官堆遗址 (2–169)
- Zuoshan Temple Ruins 左山寺遗址 (3-46)
- Qiji Temple Ruins 戚姬寺遗址 (3-68)
- Tomb of Xiang Liang 项梁墓 (3–109)

==== Juye ====
- Juye Incident Site 巨野教案遗址 (1–12) (Juye Incident)
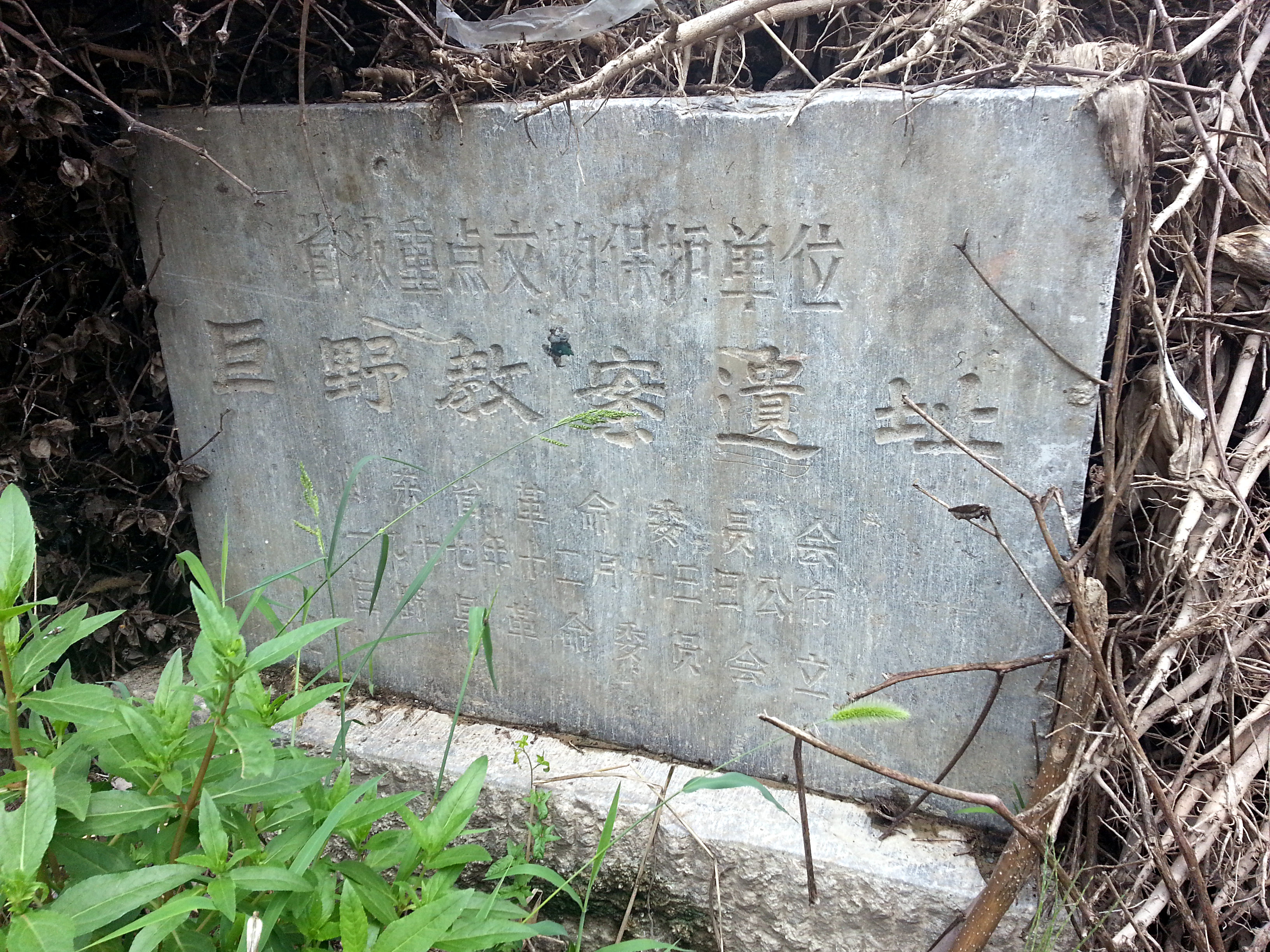
- Changyi guchengzhi 昌邑故城址 (2–211)
- Yongfeng Pagoda 永丰塔 (3–139)
- Juye Confucian Temple 巨野文庙 (3–169)

==== Dongming ====
- Doudui yizhi 窦堆遗址 (2–171)
- Dongming Confucian Temple 东明文庙 (3–171)

==== Chengwu ====
- Liushi shifang 刘氏石坊 (2-78)
- Shenshi shifang 申氏石坊 (2-79)
- Datai Ruins 大台遗址 (2–168)
- Chengwu guchengzhi 成武故城址 (2–195)

== See also ==
- Major Historical and Cultural Site Protected at the National Level
- Major National Historical and Cultural Sites (Shandong)
