= 2025 in rail transport =

This article lists events related to rail transport that occurred in 2025.

The year marks the bicentenary of the Stockton and Darlington Railway, considered to be the first operational passenger railway. Several events in the United Kingdom were held to celebrate the bicentenary as part of the Railway 200 program.

== Events ==
=== January ===
- 1 January
  - (China) – Line 5 of the Hangzhou Metro extends to East Nanhu from Jinxing.
  - (South Korea) – Donghae Line of the Korail Network opens between Yeongdeok and Samcheok.
- (China) 2 January – Bitong line of the Chongqing Suburban Railway opens between Bishan and Tongliangxi.
- 3 January – Baku-Balakən Route of the Azerbaijan Railways reopens between Baku and Balakən.
- 5 January
  - (India) – Magenta Line of the Delhi Metro extends to Krisna Park from Janakpuri West.
  - (India) – New Ashok Nagar To Meerut South Section of the Delhi–Meerut RRTS opens between New Ashok Nagar and Meerut South.
  - (Saudi Arabia) – Line 3 of the Riyadh Metro opens between Jeddah Road and Khashm Al An.
- 6 January
  - (Canada) – O-Train: Line 2 reopens and extends to Limebank from Greenboro; Line 4 opens between Airport and South Keys.
  - (France) – Nice Tramway Network: Line B opens between Nice Côte d'Azur Airport Terminal 2 and CADAM; Line 3 is rerouted between Saint Isidore and Port Lympia.
  - (Qatar) – Turquoise Line of the Lusail Tram opens between Rawdat Lusail and Crescent Park – North as a loop line.
  - (Turkey) – Otogar–Opera Line of the Eskişehir Estram opens between Otogar and Opera.
- (Finland) 7 January – Line 1 of the Tampere Light Rail extends to Lentävänniemi from Santalahti.
- (China) 10 January – Line 4 of the Ningbo Metro extends to Cicheng West from Cicheng.
- (South Korea) 11 January – Gyooe Line of the Korail Network reopens between Daegok and Uijeongbu.
- (Japan) 19 January – Chūō Line of the Osaka Metro extends to Yumeshima from Cosmosquare.
- 20 January
  - (North Macedonia) – Kumanovo-Beljakovce Line of the Macedonia Railways reopens between Kumanovo and Beljakovce.
  - (South Korea) – Southern Section of the Jungang Line opens between Cheongnyangni and Gyeongju.
- 25 January
  - (China) – Qingyuan Maglev Tourist Line opens between Yinzhan and Chimelong Forest Kingdom.
  - (Italy) – Line T2 of the Florence Tramway Network extends to San Marco-Universita from Fortezza.
  - (Tunisia) – Line D of the Tunis TFR opens between Tunis and Gobâa.
- 27 January
  - (Brazil) – Line 9 of the São Paulo Metro extends to Varginha from Mendes-Vila Natal.
  - (Italy) – Cuneo-Savigliano Line of the Arenaways reopens between Cuneo and Savigliano.

=== February ===
- (Italy) 1 February – Trieste–Opicina Tramway reopens between Piazza Oberdan and Villa Opicina.
- (Finland) 3 February – Hanko–Hyvinkää railway of the Finnish Railways is electrified between Hyvinkää and Karis.
- (Belgium) (Italy) 5 February – Brussels-Venice Route of the European Sleeper opens between Brussels and Venice.
- (Italy) (Slovenia) 8 February – Trenitalia introduces new passenger services between Venice and Nova Gorica.
- 9 February – Leixões Line of the Comboios de Portugal reopens between Contumil and Leixões.
- (Georgia (country)) 11 February – Georgian Railway resumes passenger services between Tbilisi and Ozurgeti.
- (China) 12 February – Line 1 of the Lijiang Rail Transit (Lijiang Snow Mountain Sightseeing Train) opens between Youkezhongxin and Yulongxueshan.
- (India) 15 February – The New Delhi railway station crowd crush, in which at least 18 people lost their lives.
- (Slovakia) 20 February – Haniska pri Košiciach – Moldava nad Bodvou Line is electrified between Haniska pri Kosiciach and Moldava nad Bodvou.
- (China) 22 February – Line 1 of the Taiyuan Metro opens between Helongwan and Wusu 1 Hao / 2 Hao Hangzhanlou.
- (Israel) 27 February – Jerusalem Light Rail extends to Neve Yaakov from Heil Ha-Avir; also extends to Hadassah Ein Kerem from Mount Herzl.

=== March ===
- 1 March – Kazakhstan Temir Joly introduces new passenger service between Almaty and Balkhash.
- 2 March – Line T1 of the Luxembourg Tramway Network extends to Luxembourg Airport-Findel from Luxexpo.
- (Germany) 3 March – Passenger services resume on part of the Moselle Valley Railway after over 40 years.
- (Iran) (Turkey) 9 March – Passenger services resume between Tehran and Van.
- 15 March
  - (China) – Zhengzhou-Kaifeng intercity railway extends to Kaifeng railway station from Songchenglu.
  - (Malaysia) – Extension of KTM ETS services to Segamat from Gemas.
- 23 March – The section of Transilien Line P between Esbly and Crécy-la-Chapelle becomes line T14 of the Ile-de-France Tramway Network.
- (United States) 24 March – As part of the South Coast Rail project, the Fall River/New Bedford Line of the MBTA opens from Boston to New Bedford and Fall River.
- (Uzbekistan) 28 March – Tashkent-Xoʻjakent Railway is extended from Xoʻjakent to Chinorkent.
- (France) (Italy) 31 March – The Culoz–Modane railway and the Turin–Modane railway reopen between Saint-Jean-de-Maurienne and Oulx following a 2023 landslide.

=== April ===
- 1 April
  - (Czech Republic) – Line S61 of Esko Prague opens between Praha-Vršovice and Úvaly.
  - (Italy) – Line 1 of the Naples Metro extends to Centro Direzionale from Garibaldi.
  - (Japan) – Keisei acquires the Shin-Keisei Railway and its lone route is renamed to the Matsudo Line.
  - (Japan) – Nankai acquires the Semboku Rapid Railway and its lone route is renamed to the Semboku Line.
- 4 April
  - (Italy) – La Dolce Vita Orient Express launches, starting between Rome and Montalcino.
  - (Czech Republic) – AŽD resumes passenger services between Kopidlno and Dolní Bousov as Automatic train operation.
- 6 April
  - (India) – New Pamban Bridge opens.
  - – Comboios de Portugal resumes passenger services between Mangualde and Vilar Formoso.
  - (Sri Lanka) – Maho-Omanthai railway is upgraded.
- (China) 17 April – Airport MRT of the Ürümqi Metro opens between International Airport and International Airport North.
- (India) 19 April – Katra to Banihal Section of the Jammu–Baramulla Line opens between Katra and Banihal.
- (Spain) 21 April – Line 3 of the Madrid Metro extends to El Casar from Villaverde Alto.
- (Chile) 22 April – EFE resumes passenger services between Puerto Montt and Llanquihue after 18 years.
- (Spain) 23 April – Barcelona-Seville AVE high speed service starts operations.
- 26 April – Hedjaz Jordan Railway launches first tourist train in Mafraq.
- (India) 27 April – Yellow line of the Ahmedabad Metro is extended from Sector-1 to Sachivalaya.
- (Belgium) 28 April – Liege Tramway Network opens between Sclessin, Coronmeuse, and Liège Expo.

=== May ===
- 1 May
  - (Latvia) – Rīgas Satiksme introduces new tram route 14 between Iļģuciems and Kengarags; tram route 2 is extended to Milgravis and now will run as route 8; route 10 will start from Central tirgus.
  - (Russia) – Routes 8, 9 and 10 of Saratov tram reopen as light rail.
- (India) 2 May – Vande Bharat launches passenger services between Nagpur and Mumbai.
- (Iran) 3 May – Line 2 of the Mashhad Urban Railway extended from Shahid Kaveh to Shahid Fakouri.
- (Iran) 8 May – Line 3 of the Mashhad Urban Railway opens between Imam Reza Terminal and Shohada.
- 9 May
  - (Ukraine) – Railways of Novorossiya introduces new passenger trains to Donetsk.
  - (Sweden) (Germany) – Snälltåget extends night trains to Chemnitz.
- 10 May
  - (India) – Line 3 of the Mumbai Metro extends to Acharya Atrey Chowk from Bandra - Kurla Complex.
  - (United States) – 2 Line of Link light rail extends to Downtown Redmond from Redmond Technology.
- (Croatia) 13 May – New BEMUs manufactured by Končar enter service between Zagreb and Bjelovar.
- (China) 16 May – Line 4 of the Ningbo Metro extends to International Conference Center from Dongqian Lake.
- (Thailand) 20 May – Pink Line of the Bangkok MRT branches off from Muang Thong Thani to Lake Muang Thong Thani.
- (France) 23 May – Line 1 of the Nantes tramway extends from Ranzay to Babinière railway station.
- 25 May
  - (United Kingdom) – The Labour government renationalisation of Great Britain's railways begins as train operator South Western Railway is taken into public ownership.
  - (China) (Vietnam) – Passenger services resume between Nanning and Hanoi.
- 29 May
  - (China) (Kazakhstan) – A tourist train launched between Xi'an and Almaty.
  - (South Africa) – Central Line of the Metrorail Western Cape reopens.
- (India) 30 May – Orange Line of the Kanpur Metro extends to Kanpur Central from Moti Jheel.
- 31 May
  - (India) – Yellow Line of the Indore Metro opens between Gandhi Nagar and Super Corridor 3.
  - (United States) – Sonoma–Marin Area Rail Transit extends to Windsor from Sonoma County Airport.

=== June ===
- (China) (Mongolia) 3 June – Passenger services resume between Beijing and Ulaanbaatar on the Trans-Mongolian Railway.
- 6 June
  - (India) – Jammu–Baramulla line is inaugurated.
  - (United States) – Los Angeles Metro Rail: The C Line extends to the LAX/Metro Transit Center from Aviation/Century and the K Line extends to Aviation/Century from Westchester/Veterans.
- (United States) 7 June – B Line of Valley Metro Rail & Streetcar opens from the Downtown Phoenix Hub to Baseline/Central Avenue.
- (Russia) 8 June – Petrozavodsk City Rail opens between Kondopoga and Derevyanka as well as Ladva-Vetka.
- 9 June
  - (Australia) – Thornlie railway line is extended from Thornlie to Cockburn Central.
  - (Spain) – Passenger service resumes between Zaragoza and Canfranc.
- 15 June
  - – Baku-Agstafa route of Azerbaijan Railways extends to Qazax.
  - – Trenitalia France service between Paris and Marseille begins.
  - (Poland) – Passenger services resume between Jelenia Góra and Karpacz.
- 16 June
  - (Russia) – First passenger train launched between Kirov and Kirovo-Chepetsk.|
  - (Germany) – Eifel Railway reopens.
  - (Pakistan) – Sialkot Express service relauched between Lahore and Sialkot.
- (Russia) (North Korea) 17 June – Passenger service resumes between Moscow, Khabarovsk and Pyongyang.
- (China) 18 June – Tianshui Tram extends to Jingkun Xijun Sanzhong from Wulipu and from Yangpodong to Tianshui Jichang.
- 20 June
  - (China) – Line 2 of Guangzhou Huangpu Tram opened between Xiangxue Subway Station and Kaiyuan Rd East.
  - (Croatia) (Slovenia) – New passenger train launched between Zagreb and Ljubljana via Pula.
- (India) 21 June – Pune Metro adds Khadki as an infill station on the Purple Line.
- (France) 22 June – Montréjeau-Luchon railway reopens.
- (Portugal) 24 June – The first electric train launched between Faro and Vila Real de Santo Antónion.
- (North Korea) 25 June – Wonsan Tram opens.
- 27 June
  - (China) – Chongqing–Xiamen high-speed railway opens between Chongqing East and Qianjiang.
  - (China) – The second branch of Line 6 of the Chongqing Rail Transit opened from Liujiaping to Chongqingdong Railway Station.
  - (Poland) (Croatia) – PKP Intercity introduces new passenger service between Warsaw and Rijeka.
  - (Russia) – Moscow Monorail suspends service.
- 28 June
  - (South Korea) – Line 1 of the Incheon Subway extends to Geomdan Lake Park from Gyeyang.
  - (China) – Nanchang Metro: Line 1 extended north to Changbei Airport from Shuanggang and east from Yaohu Lake West to Maqiu; Line 2 extends to Nanchang East Railway Station from Xinjia'an.
  - (Poland) – Line 19 of the Warsaw tram extends to Stegny.
- 29 June
  - (China) – Guangzhou Metro: Line 10 opens between Xilang and Yangji East; Line 12 opens in two separate sections: one between Xunfenggang and Guangzhou Gymnasium and another one between Ersha Island and Higher Education Mega Center South.
  - (France) – Transdev Rail Sud Inter-Métropoles takes over TER Provence-Alpes-Côte d'Azur service between Marseille and Nice, previously operated by SNCF Voyageurs.
- 30 June
  - (China) – Line 8 of the Ningbo Metro opens between Hansong Road and Kaiyuan Road.
  - (China) – Line 1 of the Shaoxing Metro extends to Exhibition And Convention Center from Daqingsi.
  - (China) – Line 1 of the Shenyang Metro extends to Shuangma from Limingguangchang.

=== July ===
- (Spain) 3 July – Line M1 of the Palma Metro extends from UIB to Parc Bit.
- (Italy) (France) 4 July – FS Treni Turistici Italiani launches night trains between Rome and Marseille.
- (Italy) 5 July – Trenitalia launches a direct train between Verona and Chioggia.
- (China) 8 July – The northern section of Line 4 of the Tianjin Metro opens between Xiaojie and Xizhan.
- 11 July – The first battery train in Denmark enters service between Vemb, Lemvig and Thyborøn.
- 14 July
  - (Austria) – Tauern Tunnel reopens.
  - (Sweden) – Varberg Tunnel enters operation.
  - (Sweden) (Norway) – Vy resumes passenger service between Malmö and Oslo.
- 21 July – New Biobío Railway Bridge opens in Concepción, Chile.
- (United Kingdom) 26 July – Wigan-Bolton railway is electrified.
- (Slovakia) 27 July – Route 3 of the Bratislava Tramway Network extends to Južné Mesto from Jungmannova.
- (Germany) 30 July – Zeithain–Leckwitz section of the Leipzig-Dresden line upgraded from 120 to 160 km/h after level crossing removals.

=== August ===
- (United Kingdom) 1-3 August – The Greatest Gathering, locomotive exhibition at Derby Litchurch Lane Works—celebrating 200 years since the opening of the Stockton and Darlington Railway.
- (Czech Republic) 1 August – First phase of railway link to Prague International Airport opens between Praha–Bubny and Výstaviště.
- (Japan) 3 August – Ekimae Ohashi Line of the Hiroshima Electric Railway opens between Hiroshima Station and Hijiyama-shita.
- (Austria) 4 August – The Wieserbahn is electrified between Wettmannstätten and Wies, allowing service to Graz via the Koralm Railway.
- 5 August
  - (United Kingdom) – The Dearne Valley line is electrified between Church Fenton and York, as part of the Transpennine Route Upgrade.
  - (Italy) – Double-tracking of the Rome–Pescara railway between Lunghezza and Bagni di Tivoli completed.
- (China) 6 August – Line 5 of the Nanjing Metro extends to Fangjiaying from Wenjinglu.
- (India) 11 August – Yellow Line of the Namma Metro opens from RV Road to Bommasandra.
- (United States) 18 August – Amtrak Mardi Gras Service opens between New Orleans and Mobile.
- (Vietnam) 19 August – Five City Gates Train is launched between Hanoi and Bắc Ninh.
- (Ecuador) 20 August – Passenger services resume on Alausí-Sibambe section of Guayaquil-Quito railway.
- (India) 22 August – Green Line of the Kolkata Metro extends to Esplanade from Sealdah; Yellow Line opens between Noapara and Jai Hind; Orange Line extends from Hemanta Mukhopadhyay to Beleghata.
- (United States) 28 August – First five Avelia Liberty trains enter service along the Northeast Corridor.
- (China) 29 August – Line 7 of the Ningbo Metro opens from Yunlong to Yufan.
- 30 August
  - (Malaysia) – KTM ETS extends to Kluang from Segamat.
  - (Azerbaijan) – First passenger train to Karabakh is relaunched between Baku and Aghdam.
- (Czech Republic) 31 August – Praha – České Budějovice speed increase from 160 to 200 km/h on some sections. 7-11 min faster.

=== September ===
- 1 September
  - (Austria) – Line 12 of Trams in Vienna opens from Josefstädter Straße to Hillerstraße.
  - (Croatia) (Slovenia) – HŽ Putnički prijevoz introduce Zabok–Rogatec train.
- 3 September – First driverless tram in Russia enters service on the Moscow Tram Network route 10.
- (Ukraine) 5 September – Uzhhorod-Chop standard gauge railway opens.
- (Iran) 6 September – Line 2 of the Karaj Metro extends from Ayatollah Taleghani to Shahid Soltani.
- (Russia) 10 September – New line 90 for trams in Moscow opens between Komsomolskaya Ploschad and Bulvarnoye Koltso.
- (Norway) 11 September – New Drammen Station as well as the double track between Drammen and Kobbervikdalen opens.
- 13 September
  - (India) Bairabi–Sairang railway opens.
  - (Russia) Line 16 of the Moscow Metro extends to ZIL from Novatorskaya.
  - – The first hydrogen train in the United States begins operations on Arrow between San Bernardino and Redlands, California.
- 15 September
  - (Italy) – Pistoia–Montecatini Terme section of Florence–Pistoia–Viareggio railway is doubled.
  - (Spain) – Passenger services resume on the Zafra-Huelva railway.
- 17 September
  - (Bolivia) – Yellow Line of the Cochabamba Metropolitan Train opens between Estación Central de San Antonio and Maica.
  - (China) – Chengdu Metro: Line 10 extends to Wuhouci from Taipingyuan; Line 17 extends to Gaohong from Jitouqiao.
  - (Kenya) – A commuter rail line opens in Mombasa, connecting Mombasa Terminus and Mombasa Railway Station on the tracks of the former Uganda Railway.
- (Poland) 18 September – RegioJet starts passenger services in Poland on Warsaw-Kraków route.
- 19 September
  - (Germany) – The four-track expansion between Strullendorf and Eggolsheim on the Nuremberg–Bamberg railway enters service.
  - (United States) – A Line of Los Angeles Metro Rail extends to Pomona North from APU/Citrus College.
- (United States) 22 September – New SC42-DM locomotives entered service on Metro-North Hudson Line.
- (Spain) 23 September – The new Oural Tunnel opens on the León–A Coruña railway.
- 24 September
  - (Netherlands) (Germany) – Amsterdam-Berlin ICE high speed service commences.
  - Thailand – A ground collapse on Samsen Road due to a sinkhole caused by soil flowing into an unfinished and unsecured section of the MRT Purple Line tunnel which in turn damaged a sewer line immediately delays construction while repairs last for at least a year.
- 26 September
  - (China) – Line 4 of the Nanning Metro extends from Lengtangcun to Longgang.
  - (China) – Line 1 of the Tianshui Tram extends from Tianshui Jichang to Fenlukou.
- 27 September
  - (South Korea) – Mokpo–Boseong Line of the Korail Network opens between Sinboseong to Imseong-ri.
  - (United Kingdom) – British Rail Class 756 start running on Coryton Line, Rhymney line, Rhondda line, Aberdare line and Merthyr line.
- 28 September
  - (Azerbaijan) – First interregional train is launched between Agstafa and Mingachevir.
  - (China) – Line 2 of the Changchun Rail Transit extends from Dongfang Square to Wukaihe Dajie.
  - (China) – Shenzhen Metro: Line 6 Branch extends to Guangmingcheng from Guangming; Line 16 extends to Yuanshan Xikeng from Universiade.
  - (China) – Line 7 of the Tianjin Metro opens between Saidalu and Gulou.
  - (China) – Line 6 of the Xuzhou Metro opens between Xuzhou Tongshan District Hospital of TCM and Xuzhoudong Railway Station.
  - (China) – Shenyang–Baihe high-speed railway opens.
  - (China) – Xiangyang–Jingmen high-speed railway opens.
  - (Colombia) – Passenger services resume on Paipa - Sogamoso section of the Bogotá - Belencito railway.
- 29 September
  - (China) – Binhai Express Line of the Fuzhou Metro opens between Fuzhou Railway Station and Wenling.
  - (China) – Guangzhou Metro: Guangzhou East Railway Station opens as an infill station on Line 11; Line 13 extends from Yuzhu to Tianhe Park; Line 14 extends to Lejia Road from Jiahewanggang.
  - (China) – Pearl River Delta Metropolitan Region intercity railway: Guangzhou–Huizhou intercity railway extends from Xiaojinkou to Huizhou North; Guangzhou–Foshan circular intercity railway opens new section between Panyu and Baiyun Airport North; Pazhou–Lianhuashan intercity railway opens between Pazhou and Guangzhou Lianhuashan.
- (United Kingdom) 30 September – B23 rolling stock enters service on the Docklands Light Railway.

=== October ===
- (Ghana) 1 October – Passenger service begins on the Tema-Mpakadan Railway Line.
- (Serbia) 3 October – Belgrade-Subotica high-speed train is launched as part of the Budapest–Belgrade railway.
- (Netherlands) 4 October – Last locomotives are retired from domestic passenger services by the Nederlandse Spoorwegen.
- 6 October
  - (Austria) – Railjet starts operations between Lienz and Vienna.
  - (Austria) – New line 27 of Trams in Vienna opens between Aspern Nord and Strebersdorf Edmund-Hawranek-Platz.
- (India) 7 October – Patna Metro opens between New ISBT and Bhootnath.
- (Turkey) 8 October – Yıldıztepe metro station on the M3 line opens for service.
- 9 October
  - (India) – Line 3 of the Mumbai Metro extends to Cuffe Parade from Acharya Atrey Chowk, completing the line.
  - (Germany) – New Stadler FLIRT3 XL (class 3428) trains start operations in DB Regio services between Trier, Koblenz and Perl.
- (Romania) (Ukraine) 10 October – Passenger services resume between Bucharest and Kyiv.
- (Austria) (Slovakia) 11 October – Marchegger Eastern Railway reopens and is electrified between Vienna and Bratislava.
- 13 October
  - (Australia) – The Armadale line of the Transperth Network reopens and extends to Byford from Armadale.
  - (Australia) – New South Wales D set starts operations on the Blue Mountains Line.
- 16 October
  - (France) – New MF 19 rolling stock enters operation on Line 10 of the Paris Metro.
  - (Italy) – Line 7 of the Milan tramway network is extended from Anassagora to Adriano-Vipiteno.
  - (United States) – Honolulu Skyline extends from Hālawa to Kahauiki.
- 18 October – Line 1 of the Montpellier Tramway Network extends to Gare Sud de France from Odysseum.
- 20 October
  - (Czech Republic) – New ComfortJet trains enter Austria being introduced on Prague-Vienna-Graz route.
  - (Kazakhstan) – New suburban train is launched between Arkalyk and Derzhavinsk.
- (United States) 24 October – KC Streetcar extends to UMKC from Union Station.
- (United States) 25 October – Silver Line opens between Dallas Fort Worth International Airport and Plano.
- 26 October
  - (Denmark) – Greater Copenhagen Light Rail opens southern phase between Rødovre Nord and Ishøj station.
  - (Russia) (Kazakhstan) – Passenger services resume between Moscow and Almaty.

=== November ===
- (China) 1 November – Line 2 of the Shanghai Metro extends to Panxiang Road · Shanghai National Accounting Institute from National Exhibition and Convention Center.
- 3 November
  - (Finland) – VR Class Sm6 trainsets start domestic services on Helsinki-Turku route.
  - (Germany) (Denmark) – Talgo 230 trainsets start operations on Copenhagen-Hamburg route.
- (Italy) 10 November – Line 7 of the Naples metropolitan railway service opens between Monte Sant'Angelo and Soccavo.
- (Russia) 12 November – New line T1 of the Trams in Moscow opens between Universitet and Metrogorodok.
- (France) 15 November – Line F of the Strasbourg Tramway Network extends to Wolfisheim from Comtes.
- (Canada) 17 November – Montreal REM: Deux-Montagnes branch opens between Deux-Montagnes and Gare Centrale.
- (United States) 18 November – Pittsburgh International Airport People Mover is permanently decommissioned.
- (Mexico) 21 November – Line K of the Tren Interoceánico opens between Ixtepec and Tonalá.
- 28 November
  - (China) – Line 1 of Dongguan Rail Transit opens between Dongguanxi Railway Station and Meitang.
  - (China) – Panzhou–Xingyi high-speed railway opens.
- (Austria) 29 November – New lines 16 and 17 of Graz tramway network open.
- (Australia) 30 November – Metro Tunnel opens, connecting the Pakenham, Cranbourne, and Sunbury metropolitan rail lines in Melbourne.

=== December ===
- (Brazil) 1 December – Line 2 of the Baixada Santista Light Rail opens between Conselheiro Nébias and Valongo.
- 3 December
  - (Russia) – Burevestnik train returns on Moscow-Nizhny Novgorod route but now as double-decker.
  - (United Kingdom) – East Midlands Railway introduces British Rail Class 810 Aurora train on the Midland Main Line.
  - (United Kingdom) – Rhymney line of the South Wales Metro is electrified.
- (China) 5 December – Nanning–Pingxiang high-speed railway extends from Chongzuo to Pingxiang.
- 6 December
  - (China) – Jinan SkyShuttle opens as a loop line as part of the Jinan Metro.
  - (France) – Bordeaux Tramway Network: Line E opens between Gare de Blanquefort and Floirac Dravemont while Line F opens between Bordeaux Airport and Bordeaux-Saint-Jean.
  - (United States) – 1 Line of Link light rail extends to Federal Way Downtown from Angle Lake.
- (Canada) 7 December – Line 6 Finch West of the Toronto subway opens between Humber College and Finch West.
- (United States) 8 December – Buffalo Metro Rail extends to DL&W from Canalside.
- (China) 10 December – Line 4 of the Fuzhou Metro extends to Banzhou from Fenghuangchi.
- 12 December
  - (Malaysia) – KTM ETS extends to Johor Bahru Sentral, concluding the Gemas–Johor Bahru electrification and double-tracking project.
  - (France) (Germany) (Austria) – ÖBB and SNCF Voyageurs end their joint Nightjet service between Paris and Berlin/Vienna.
- 14 December
  - (Austria) – Koralm Railway opens between Graz and Klagenfurt.
  - (Czech Republic) (Austria) – New ComfortJet trains introduced on Prague-Villach route.
  - (Czech Republic) (Poland) – České dráhy launches a new night train between Prague and Przemyśl.
  - (Germany) – Berlin Airport Express between Flughafen and Berlin Hauptbahnhof is rerouted via Berlin Südkreuz.
  - (Germany) – The four-track expansion between Müllheim and Auggen on the Rhine Valley Railway enters service.
  - (Germany) – ICE L trains enter service between Berlin and Cologne.
  - (Italy) – Line S19 of the Milan suburban railway opens from Milano Rogoredo to Albairate–Vermezzo.
  - (Norway) – Electrification of the Meråker Line is completed between Trondheim and Storlien.
  - (Sweden) – Line 12 of the Gothenburg Tramway opens between Mölndal and Lindholmen, Line 10 is rerouted to Lindholmen from Biskopsgården, Line 2 is rerouted to Biskopsgården from Mölndal.
  - (Switzerland) – Double-tracking of the Basel–Biel/Bienne railway line between Grellingen and Duggingen completed.
  - (United Kingdom) – East Kilbride Line of the ScotRail Network is electrified between Glasgow Central and East Kilbride.
  - (United Kingdom) – Lumo extends London King's Cross-Edinburgh service to Glasgow Queen Street via Falkirk High.
- 15 December
  - (Mexico) – Line 4 of SITEUR opens between Las Juntas and Tlajomulco Centro.
  - (Estonia) – New Škoda 21Ev train starts passenger operations on Tallinn-Kloogaranna route.
- 16 December
  - (China) – Chengdu Metro: Line 13 opens between Wayaotan and Long'an; Line 30 opens between East of Terminal 2 of Shuangliu International Airport and Longquanyi Railway Station South.
  - (Croatia) (Hungary) – Hungarian border–Botovo–Koprivnica–Dugo Selo railway is modernised.
  - (Italy) – Line C of the Rome Metro extends to Colosseo from San Giovanni.
  - (Madagascar) – Urban passenger service is launched between Soarano station Antananarivo and Ambohimanambola.
  - (Russia) – New line 5 of Trams in Moscow is launched between Moscow Belorussky railway station and Moscow Rizhsky railway station.
- (China) 19 December – Nanjing Metro: Line 3 extends to Moling from Mozhoudonglu; Line 10 extends to Dongqilu from Andemen.
- (France) 20 December – Line 5 of the Montpellier Tramway Network opens between Clapiers and Lavérune.
- (India) 21 December – Orange Line of the Bhoj Metro opens between AIIMS and Subhash Nagar.
- 22 December
  - (Poland) – Line 19 of the Warsaw tram network extends from Goworka to Pole Mokotowskie.
  - (China) – Shantou–Shanwei high-speed railway opens remaining section between Shantou South railway station and Shantou Railway Station.
  - (China) – Guangzhou-Zhanjiang high-speed rail opens between Guangzhou Baiyun railway station and Zhanjiang North Station
- (China) 23 December – Baotou-Yinchuan high-speed railway is made fully operational with the opening of the Baotou-Huinong section.
- 24 December
  - (Russia) – Slavyanka tram line of the Saint Petersburg tramway network opens between Kupchino and Shushary.
  - (Japan) – E3 Series Shinkansen ends regular passenger service after 28 years of operation.
- (China) 25 December – Longluxu Railway opens.
- 26 December
  - (China) – Line 6 of Hefei Metro opens between Beiyanhu and Longtang.
  - (China) – The Wuhan–Yichang high-speed railway, a section of the larger Shanghai–Chongqing–Chengdu high-speed railway, enters operation.
  - (China) – Xi'an–Yan'an high-speed railway opens between Xi'an East and Yan'an, parallelling the existing Xi'an–Yan'an railway.
  - (China) – Hangzhou–Quzhou high-speed railway opens.
  - (Russia) – Saint Peterburg Metro Line 6 opens between Yugo-Zapadnaya and Putilovskaya.
- 27 December
  - (China) – Beijing Subway: Line 6 extends to Luyang from Lucheng; Line 17 extends to Shilihe from Workers' Stadium: Line 18 opens between Malianwa and Tiantongyuandong.
  - (China) – Jinan Metro: Line 4 opens between Shandong First Medical University and Pengjiazhuang; Line 6 opens between Shandong University and Liangwang; Line 8 opens between Xingcun Lijiaoqiao East and Qingyuan Dajie.
  - (China) – Line 18 of the Shanghai Metro extends to Kangwen Road from South Changjiang Road.
- 28 December
  - (China) – Shenzhen Metro:Line 5 extends from Huangbeiling to Grand Theater; Line 8 extends from Xiaomeisha to Xichong; Line 11 extends from Huaqiang South to Hongling South; Line 13 extends from Hi-Tech Central to Shangwu.
  - Mexico – A train operating on Line Z of Tren Interoceánico derails at Asunción Ixtaltepec, killing 13 people and injuring 98, with 5 being severely injured.
- 29 December
  - (China) – Line 22 of the Guangzhou Metro extends to Fangcun from Chentougang.
  - (China) – Line 15 of the Xi'an Metro opens between Xiliu and Dongzhaoyu.
- 30 December
  - (China) – Jiyang Line of the Jinan Metro opens between Jinandong Railway Station and Jiyang North.
  - (China) – Hefei-Xinyi High-Speed Railway opens between Hefei West railway station and Sixian East Railway Station.
