= Line 2 (Jinan Metro) =

Metro line in Jinan, Shandong, China

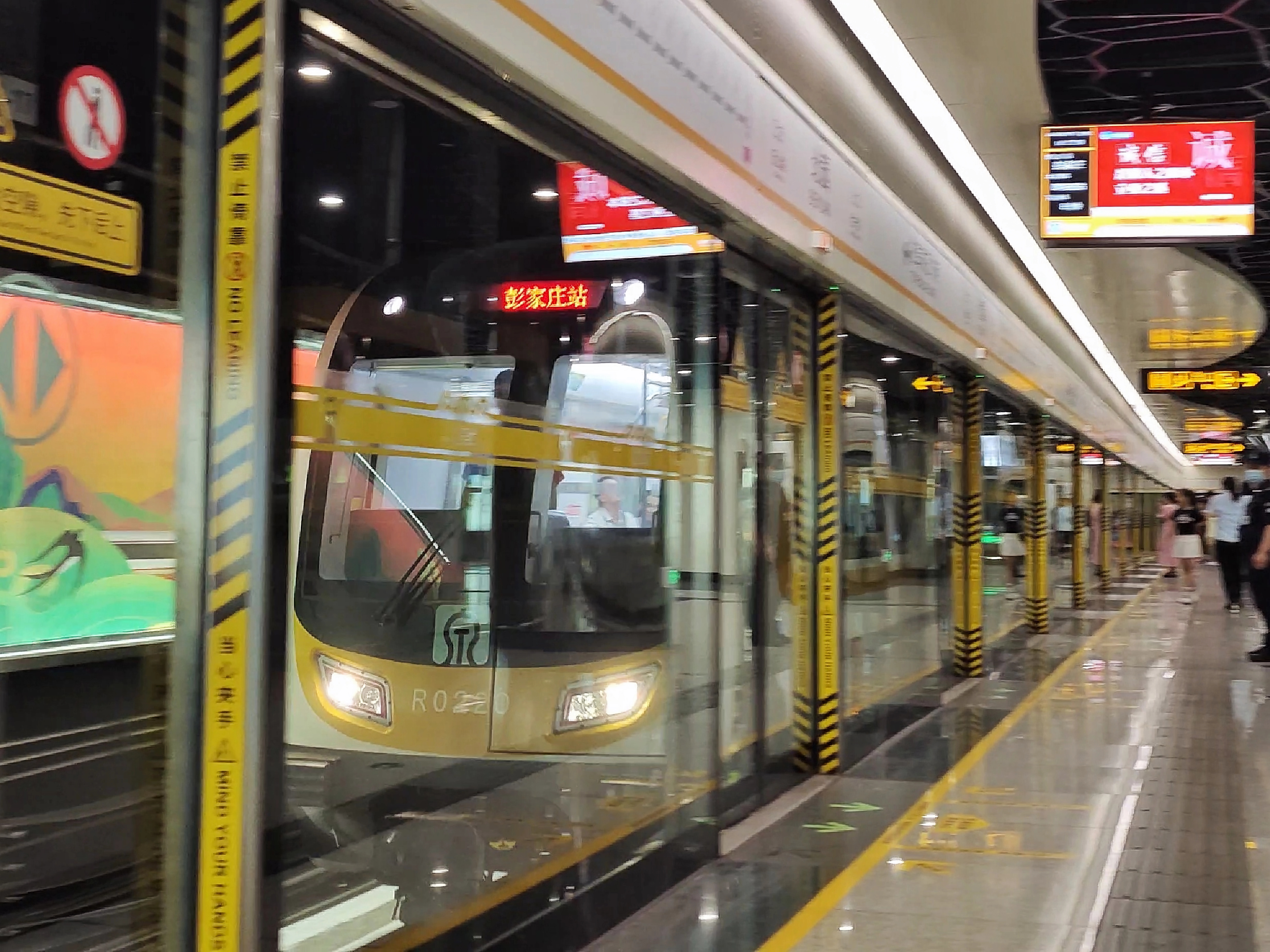
- A train of Jinan Metro Line 2

Overview
- Other name: R2 (construction name)
- Status: Operating
- Locale: Jinan
- Termini: Wangfuzhuang; Pengjiazhuang
- Stations: 19 (Phase 1)

Service
- Type: Rapid transit
- System: Jinan Metro
- Rolling stock: 6-car Type B

History
- Opened: March 26, 2021; 5 years ago

Technical
- Line length: 36.39 km (22.61 mi)
- Character: underground and elevated
- Track gauge: 1,435 mm (4 ft 8 1/2 in)
- Operating speed: 100 km/h (62 mph)

Line 2 of Jinan Metro (Chinese: 济南地铁2号线; pinyin: Jǐnán Dìtiě Èr Hào Xiàn) is a rapid transit line in Jinan, Shandong, China. The line uses six-car Type B rolling stock. The line is 36.39 kilometres (22.61 mi) in length, including a 34.8-kilometre (21.6-mile)-long underground section. The line began operation on 26 March 2021.

== Significance ==
Prior to the opening of Line 2, Jinan Metro consisted of the separate Line 1 and Line 3 with no means of transfer between them. Line 2 runs east to west and interchanges with both existing lines. It is the first fully automated (GoA4) line of Jinan Metro system.

== Stations ==
Station Name		Connections	Distance km	District
English	Chinese	Connections	Distance km	District
Wangfuzhuang	王府庄	1		Huaiyin
Lashannan	腊山南			Huaiyin
Lashan	腊山	4		Huaiyin
Erhuanxilu	二环西路			Huaiyin
Laotun	老屯			Huaiyin
Baliqiao	八里桥			Tianqiao
Yikanglu	益康路			Tianqiao
Jinan Railway Station North	济南站北			Tianqiao
Jiluolu	济泺路			Tianqiao
Shengchanlu	生产路			Tianqiao
Beiyuan	北园			Tianqiao
Lishanlu	历山路			Tianqiao
Qilipu	七里堡			Licheng
Zhudian	祝甸			Licheng
Bajianpu	八涧堡	3		Lixia
Jiangjiazhuang	姜家庄			Lixia
Fenghuang Beilu	凤凰北路	6		Licheng
Baoshan	鲍山			Licheng
Pengjiazhuang	彭家庄	SkyShuttle Line 1		Licheng
