= Jinan–Laiwu high-speed railway =

High-speed rail line in China

Jinan–Laiwu high-speed railway 济莱高速铁路

Overview
- Status: Operational
- Locale: Jinan, Shandong Province, China
- Termini: Jinan East; Gangcheng
- Stations: 6

Service
- Operator: China Railway Jinan Group

History
- Opened: 30 December 2022

Technical
- Line length: 117.49 km (73 mi)
- Track gauge: 1,435 mm (4 ft 8 1/2 in)
- Operating speed: 350 km/h (217 mph)

Jinan–Laiwu high-speed railway is a high-speed railway in Jinan, Shandong Province, China. It will have a design speed of 350 kilometres per hour (220 mph). The expected journey time between the two terminuses is 22.5 minutes.

== History ==
Plans for the railway were confirmed in 2017. Construction started in September 2019. The railway opened on 30 December 2022.

An extension to Linyi North railway station in Linyi on the Rizhao–Lankao high-speed railway is under planning. It will be renamed as Jinan–Laiwu–Linyi high-speed railway after the extension.

== Stations ==
Station Name	Chinese	Metro transfers/connections	China Railway transfers/connections	Location		
Jinan East	济南东	3		Licheng	Jinan	Shandong
Licheng	历城			Licheng	Jinan	Shandong
Zhangqiu South	章丘南			Zhangqiu	Jinan	Shandong
Xueye	雪野			Laiwu	Jinan	Shandong
Laiwu North	莱芜北			Laiwu	Jinan	Shandong
Gangcheng	钢城			Gangcheng	Jinan	Shandong
