= Line 1 (Jinan Metro) =

Metro line in Jinan, China

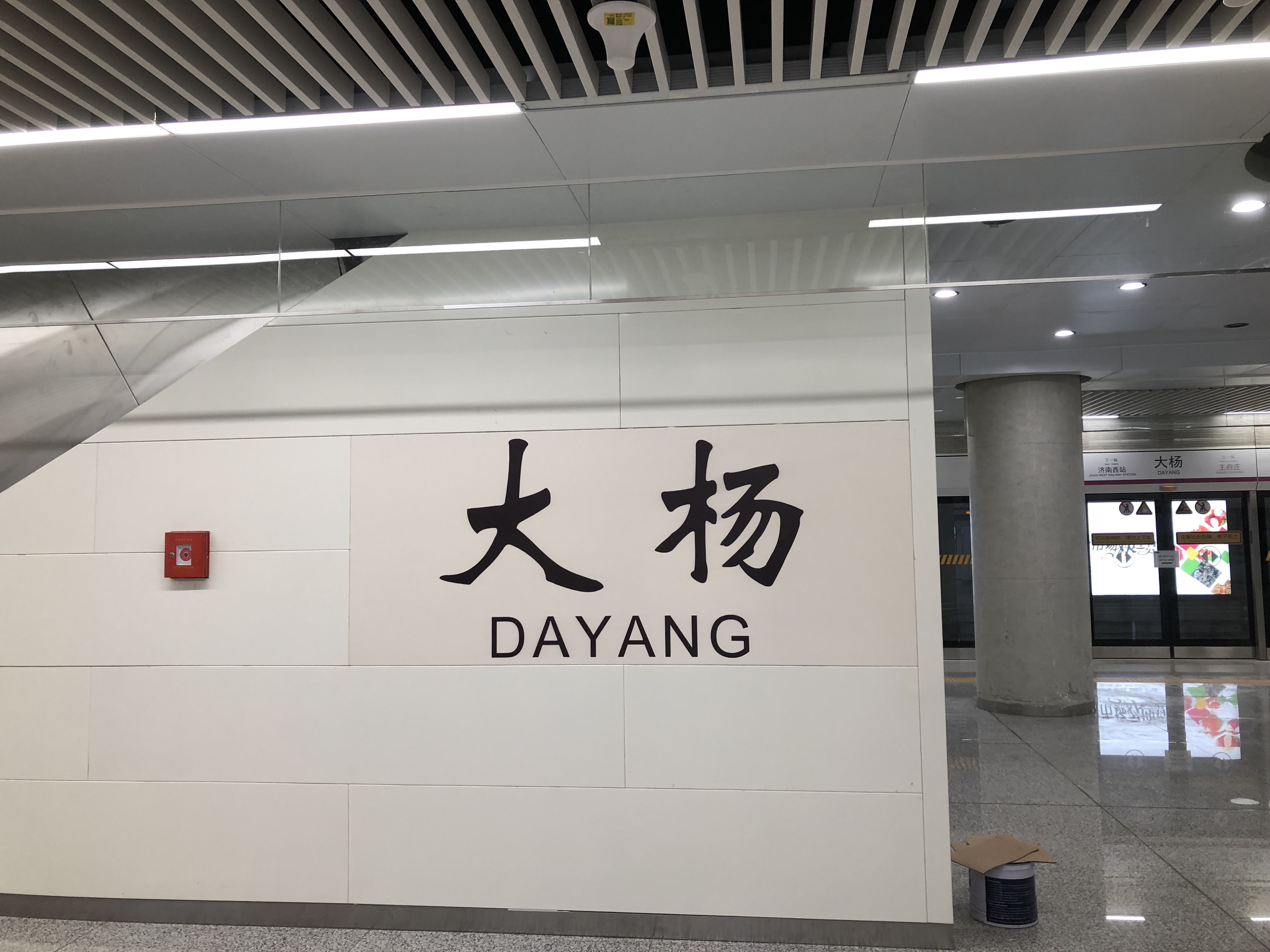
- Dayang station, Line 1

Overview
- Other name: R1 (construction name)
- Locale: Jinan
- Termini: Fangte; Gongyanyuan
- Stations: 11

Service
- Type: Rapid transit
- System: Jinan Metro
- Rolling stock: 4-car Type B

History
- Opened: April 1, 2019; 7 years ago

Technical
- Line length: 26.27 kilometres (16.32 mi)
- Track gauge: 1,435 mm (4 ft 8 1/2 in)
- Operating speed: 100 km/h (62 mph)

Line 1 of Jinan Metro (Chinese: 济南地铁1号线; pinyin: Jǐnán Dìtiě Yī Hào Xiàn) is a rapid transit line in Jinan, China. The line uses four-car Type B rolling stock, with an option to expand to six-car Type B in the future.

The line began operating on April 1, 2019.

== Timeline ==
Segment	Opened	Length	Station(s)	Name
Fangte — Gongyanyuan	1 April 2019	26.27 km	11	Phase 1

== Stations ==
Station Name		Connections	Distance km	District
English	Chinese	Connections	Distance km	District
Fangte	方特			Huaiyin
Jinanxi Railway Station	济南西站	JGK; 6 Jiyang (OSI)		Huaiyin
Dayang	大杨	4		Huaiyin
Wangfuzhuang	王府庄	2		Huaiyin
Yufuhe	玉符河			Shizhong
Zhaoying	赵营			Changqing
Ziweilu	紫薇路			Changqing
Daxuecheng	大学城			Changqing
Yuanboyuan	园博园			Changqing
Chuangxingu	创新谷			Changqing
Gongyanyuan	工研院			Changqing
