= Jinan–Zaozhuang high-speed railway =

High-speed rail line under construction in China

Overview
- Status: Under Construction
- Termini: Jinan East; Tai'erzhuang
- Stations: 10

Service
- Operator(s): China Railway Jinan Group

History
- Opened: December 2027

Technical
- Line length: 268.564 km (167 mi)
- Track gauge: 1,435 mm (4 ft 8 1/2 in)
- Operating speed: 350 km/h (217 mph)

The Jinan–Zaozhuang high-speed railway (Chinese: 济枣高速铁路; pinyin: Jǐzǎo gāosù tiělù) is a high-speed railway under construction in Shandong Province, China. It will run parallel to the Beijing–Shanghai high-speed railway with two shared stations.

Construction of the line had been expected to start in April 2021. However, in April 2021, it was announced that the project had been postponed. Construction started on 16 December 2023 and will be finished in 4 years.

== Stations ==
Station Name	Chinese	Metro transfers/connections
Jinan East	济南东	3
Licheng	历城	
Nanshan	南山	
Tai'an East	泰安东	
Ningyang East	宁阳东	
Qufu East	曲阜东	
Zoucheng	邹城	
Tengzhou East	滕州东	
Zaozhuang South	枣庄南	
Tai'erzhuang	台儿庄	
