= Jinan Metro =

Rapid transit system serving Jinan, Shandong, China

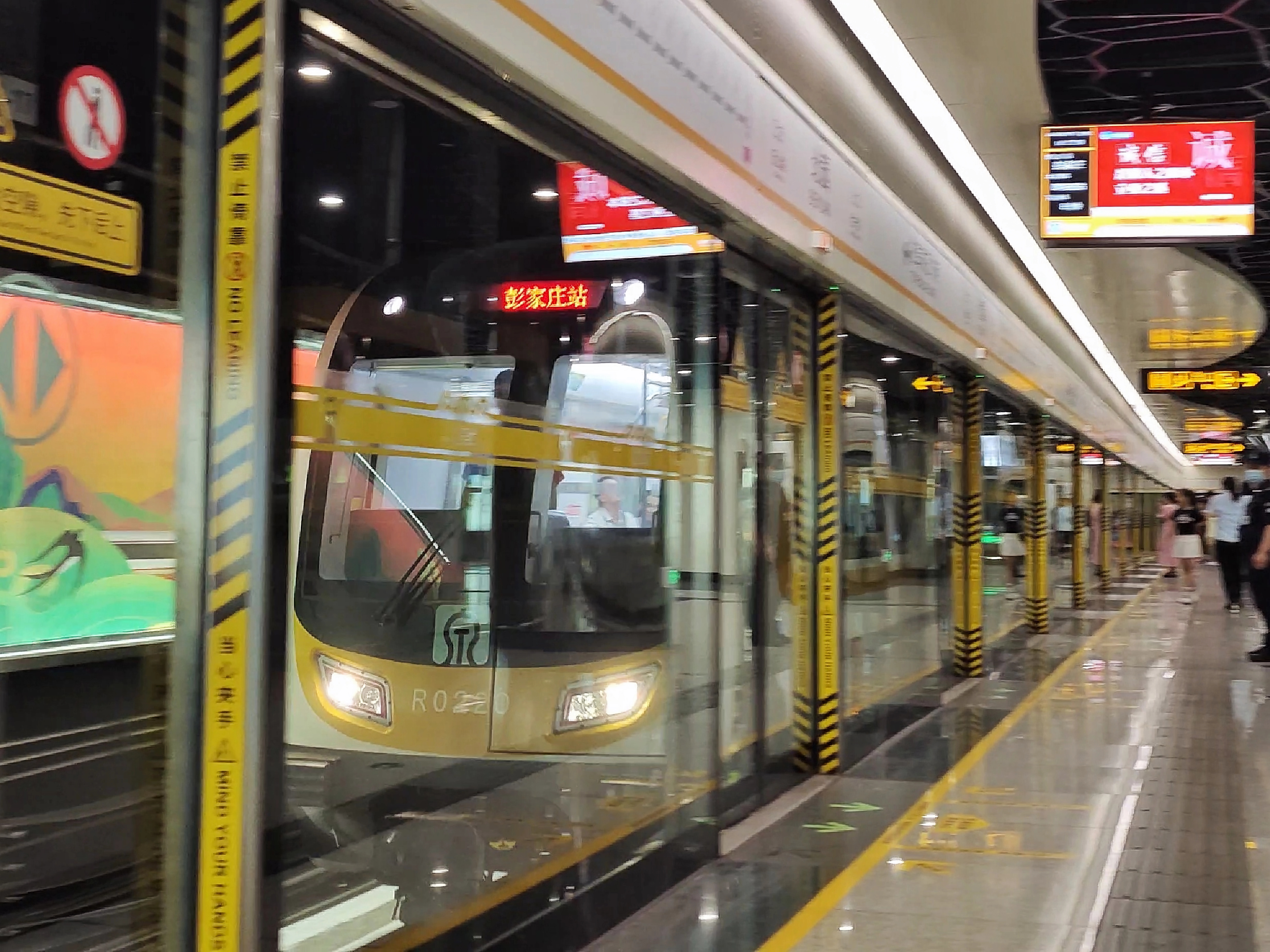
- Line 2 train at Beiyuan station

Overview
- Locale: Jinan, Shandong
- Transit type: Rapid transit
- Number of lines: 8 (operating); 2 (under construction)
- Number of stations: 151 (operating); 108 (Metro lines only)
- Daily ridership: 1,452,300 (Highest record on 31 December 2025)
- Annual ridership: 116.39 million (2024)

Operation
- Began operation: 1 April 2019; 7 years ago

Technical
- System length: 232.68 km (144.58 mi); 181.53 km (112.80 mi) (Metro lines only)
- Track gauge: 1,435 mm (4 ft 8 1/2 in) standard gauge
System map
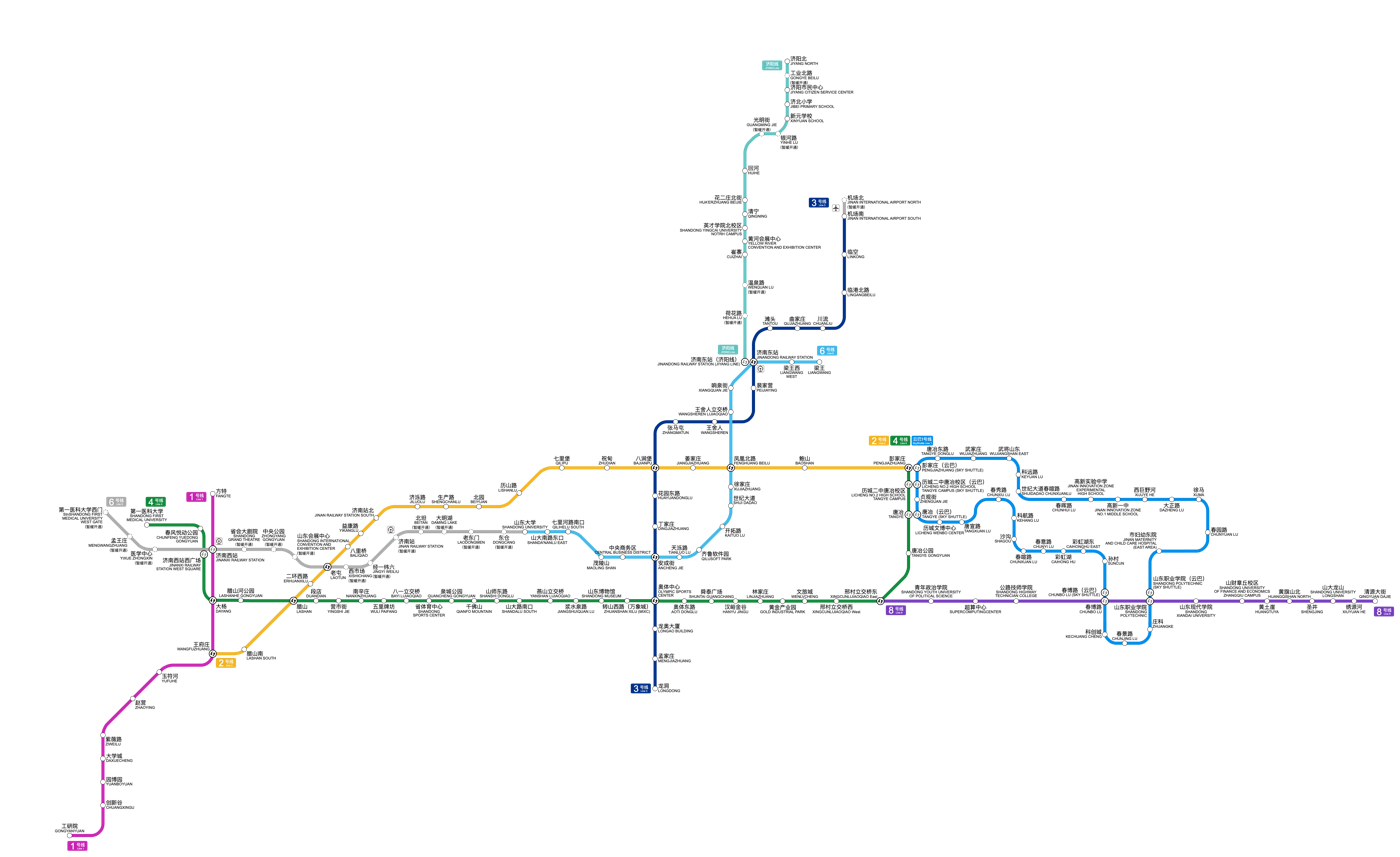
Key

Jinan Metro (Chinese: 济南地铁; pinyin: Jǐnán Dìtiě), also known as Jinan Rail Transit (Chinese: 济南轨道交通; pinyin: Jǐnán Guǐdào Jiāotōng) is a rapid transit system serving Jinan, the capital of Shandong province, China.

== History ==
Planning of the system began in the early 2000s but was delayed due to 2008 world economic crisis. After years of preparation, construction started at an official ceremony on 29 December 2013. Line 1 was opened on 1 April 2019.

The first phase of construction was adopted by National Development and Reform Commission and included three lines (1, 2, and 3) with 47 stations. The first phase has a total length of 96.5 kilometres (60.0 mi): 72.2 kilometres (44.9 mi) underground, 23.8 kilometres (14.8 mi) elevated, and one-half kilometre (0.3 miles) transitional. It is expected to cost up to ¥48.9 bn. Phase 1 was completed on 27 December 2025, when Lines 4, 6 and 8 opened simultaneously.

The fare system is based on existing smart card technology.

== Lines in operation ==
Line	Terminals (District)		Opened	Length in km	Stations
1	Fangte (Huaiyin)	Gongyanyuan (Changqing)	1 April 2019	26.27	11
2	Wangfuzhuang (Huaiyin)	Pengjiazhuang (Licheng)	26 March 2021	36.39	19
3	Longdong (Lixia)	Jichangnan (Jinan International Airport South) (Licheng)	28 December 2019	33.67	18
4	Shandong First Medical University (Huaiyin)	Pengjiazhuang (Licheng)	27 December 2025	40.2	33
6	Shandong University (Lixia)	Liangwang (Licheng)	27 December 2025	19.5	17
8	Xingcun Lijiaoqiao East (Licheng)	Qingyuan Dajie (Zhangqiu)	27 December 2025	25.5	10
Jiyang	Jiyang North (Jiyang)	Jinandong Railway Station (Licheng)	30 December 2025	36.1	11
SkyShuttle Line 1	Loop line		6 December 2025	30.55	32
Total				232.68	151
Total (Metro lines only)				181.53	108

=== Line 1 ===
Line 1 runs north–south in the western part of the city. The line began operating on 1 April 2019, and cost CN¥12 billion to build.

=== Line 2 ===
Line 2 is 36.39 kilometres (22.61 mi) in length, including a 34.8-kilometre (21.6-mile)-long underground section. The line began operating on 26 March 2021.

=== Line 3 ===
Line 3 (Phase 1) is 21.592 kilometres (13.417 miles) long. It is completely underground. The line began operating on 28 December 2019.

=== Line 4 ===
Line 4 is 40.3 kilometres (25.0 miles) long. The line began operating on 27 December 2025.

=== Line 6 ===
Line 6 (Phase 1) is 40.1 kilometres (24.9 miles) long. The line began operating on 27 December 2025.

=== Line 8 ===
Line 8 is 25.5 kilometres (15.8 miles) long. The line began operating on 27 December 2025.

=== Jiyang Line ===
The Jiyang Line is 36.1 kilometres (22.4 miles) long, running from Jinan East railway station to the Jiyang district. The line began operating on 30 December 2025.

=== SkyShuttle Line 1 ===
Jinan SkyShuttle Line 1 runs in a loop in the eastern part of the city. The fully elevated line using a BYD SkyShuttle automated guideway transit system began operating on 6 December 2025. It is 30.55 km in length with 32 stations.

== Future Development ==
Phase 2 Construction Plan

Phase 2 was approved by the National Development and Reform Commission on 30 October 2020. Phase 2 consists of 159.6 km of new subway and is proposed to start construction in 2020.

Line	Terminals (District)		Opening Date	Length in km	Stations	Status
3	Jichangnan	Jichangbei	2027	3.3	1	Under Construction
6	Weilizhuang	Liangwang	2026-2027 (Full)	40.1	33	Under Construction
7	Jinanbei Railway Station	Fenghuang Nanlu	2028	30.0	22	Under Construction
9	Huanghe Nan'an	Maozhuang	2027	14.8	11	Under Construction

== Rolling stock ==
Lines 1, 2, and 3 use Type B rolling stock. Lines 2 and 3 have six-car trains, whereas Line 1 has four-car trains with provision for an increase to six-car trains in the future. Lines 4, 6 and 8 use high capacity type A rolling stock.

Lines 7 and 9 will use high capacity Type A rolling stock like the lines 4, 6 and 8.

== See also ==
- List of metro systems
- Urban rail transit in China
