= Line 3 (Jinan Metro) =

Metro line in Jinan, China

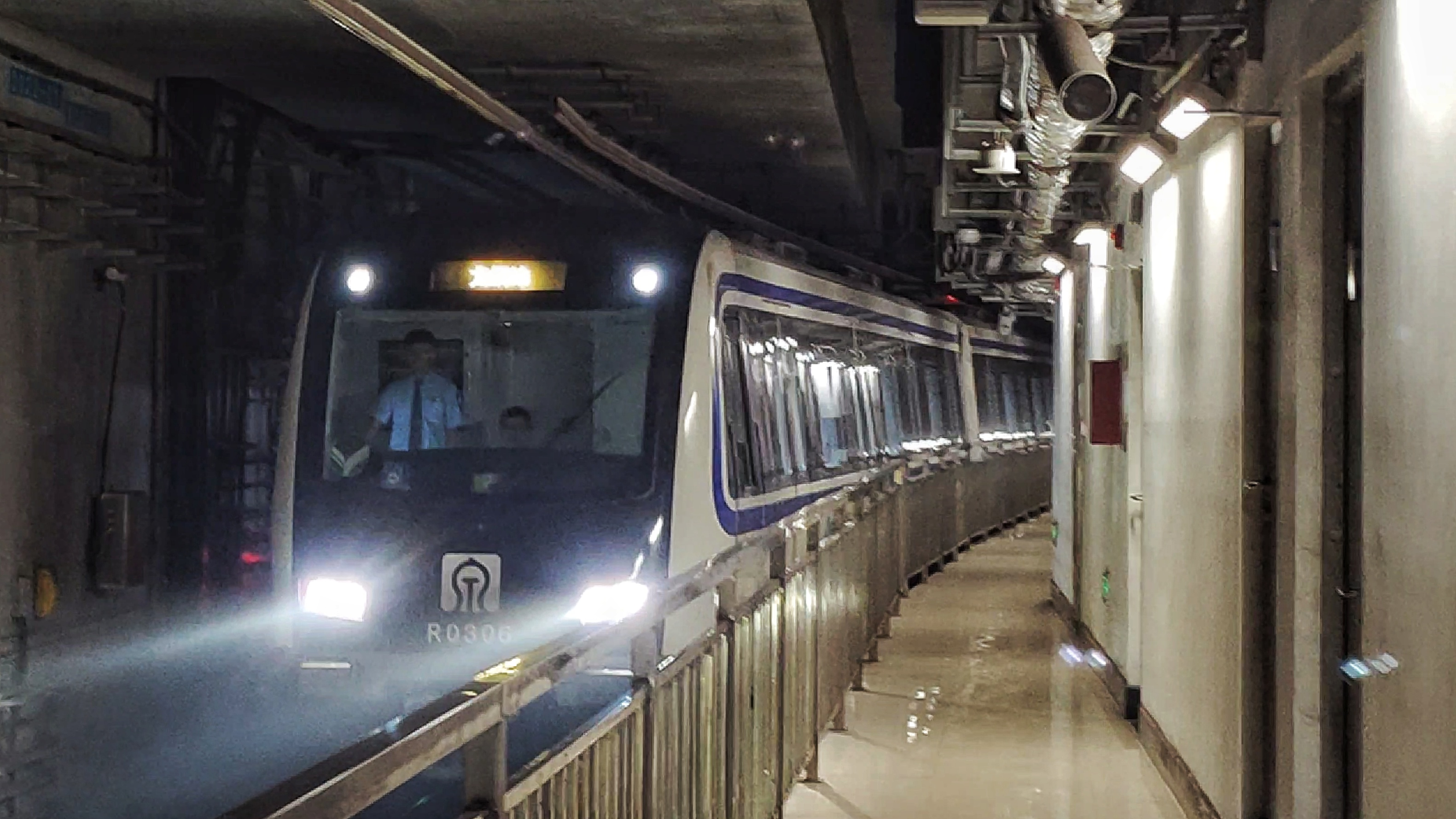
- A train of Jinan Metro Line 3

Overview
- Other name: R3 (construction name)
- Status: operating
- Locale: Jinan
- Termini: Longdong; Jichangnan (Jinan International Airport South)
- Stations: 18

Service
- Type: rapid transit
- System: Jinan Metro
- Rolling stock: 6-car Type B

History
- Opened: 28 December 2019; 6 years ago

Technical
- Line length: 33.675 km (20.9 mi) (Future: 34.328 km (21.3 mi))
- Character: underground
- Track gauge: 1,435 mm (4 ft 8 1/2 in)
- Operating speed: 100 km/h (62 mph)

Line 3 of Jinan Metro (Chinese: 济南地铁3号线; pinyin: Jǐnán Dìtiě Sān Hào Xiàn) is a rapid transit line in Jinan, China. The line use six-car Type B rolling stock. The line is 33.675 kilometres (20.9 miles) long. It is completely underground.

Phase 1 of Line 3 was opened on 28 December 2019. Phase 2 of Line 3 opened on 22 November 2024 (Jichangbei station is still under construction).

== Timeline ==
Segment	Opened	Length	Station(s)	Name
Longdong — Tantou	28 December 2019	21.592 km (13.4 mi)	12	Phase 1
Peijiaying	25 October 2023	n/a	1	infill station
Tantou — Jichangnan	22 November 2024	12.083 km (7.5 mi)	5	Phase 2
Jichangnan — Jichangbei	2027 or 2028 (U/C)	0.653 km (0.4 mi)	1	Phase 2

== Stations ==
Services		Station Name		Connections	Distance km	District
Local	Rapid	English	Chinese	Connections	Distance km	District
·	△	Longdong	龙洞		0	Lixia
·	|	Mengjiazhuang	孟家庄			Lixia
·	|	Longao Building	龙奥大厦			Lixia
·	△	Olympic Sports Center	奥体中心	4		Lixia
·	|	Ancheng Jie (Note: Formerly known as Ligenglu until 22 November 2024.)	安成街	6		Lixia
·	△	Dingjiazhuang	丁家庄			Lixia
·	|	Huayuandonglu	花园东路			Lixia
·	△	Bajianpu	八涧堡	2		Lixia
·	|	Zhangmatun	张马屯			Licheng
·	△	Wangsheren	王舍人			Licheng
·	|	Peijiaying	裴家营			Licheng
·	▲	Jinandong Railway Station	济南东站	OSI: Jiyang; 6 MDK		Licheng
·	|	Tantou	滩头			Licheng
·	|	Qujiazhuang	曲家庄			Licheng
·	|	Chuanliu	川流			Licheng
·	|	Lingangbeilu	临港北路			Licheng
·	|	Linkong	临空			Licheng
·	▲	Jichangnan (Jinan International Airport South)	机场南		33.675	Licheng
		Jichangbei (Jinan International Airport North) (U/C)	机场北		34.328	Licheng
