= Line 6 (Jinan Metro) =

Rapid transit line in Jinan, China

- 6

Overview
- Native name: 济南轨道交通6号线
- Status: Operational (East Section)
- Owner: Jinan Rail Transit Group
- Locale: Jinan, Shandong, China
- Termini: Shandong University; Liangwang
- Stations: 17 (operational); 33 (total)

Service
- Type: Rapid transit
- System: Jinan Metro
- Operator: Jinan Metro
- Depot(s): Weilizhuang Depot; Liangwang Yard
- Rolling stock: CRRC Qingdao Sifang 6-car Type A trains

History
- Opened: 27 December 2025; 8 months ago (East Section)

Technical
- Line length: 19.5 km (12.1 mi)
- Number of tracks: 2
- Track gauge: 1,435 mm (4 ft 8 1/2 in)
- Electrification: Overhead catenary, 1.5 kV DC
- Operating speed: 80 km/h (50 mph)

Jinan Metro Line 6 (Chinese: 济南轨道交通6号线) is a rapid transit line of Jinan Metro system. Construction of Line 6 officially started on 29 September 2021. The east section was officially opened for passenger service on 27 December 2025 at 10:15 am, with Line 4 and Line 8.

== Timeline ==
Segment	Opened	Length	Station(s)	Name
Shandong University — Liangwang	27 December 2025	19.5 km (12.1 mi)	17	East section
Shandong First Medical University West Gate — Dongcang	Under construction	-	15	West section

== Stations ==
The interval between the eastern section of Line 6 is 5 minutes and 30 seconds for peak hours on weekdays, 7 minutes and 30 seconds for normal, and about 10 minutes for low peaks, and the interval on weekends is the same as that of peak and low peak hours on weekdays.

Station name		Transfer	Distance km		Location
English	Chinese	Transfer	Inter-station	Cumulative	Location
Shandong University	山东大学		0.00	0.00	Lixia
Shanda'nanlu East	山大南路东口				Lixia
Qilihelu South	七里河路南口				Lixia
Maoling Shan	茂陵山				Lixia
Central Business District	中央商务区	Line 7 (U/C)			Lixia
Ancheng Jie	安成街	3			Lixia
Tianluo Lu	天泺路				Lixia
Qilusoft Park	齐鲁软件园				Lixia
Kaituo Lu	开拓路				Lixia
Shiji Dadao	世纪大道				Licheng
Xujiazhuang	徐家庄				Licheng
Fenghuang Beilu	凤凰北路	2			Licheng
Wangsheren Lijiaoqiao	王舍人立交桥				Licheng
Xiangquan Jie	响泉街	Line 9 (U/C)			Licheng
Jinandong Railway Station	济南东站	3 OSI: Jiyang; MDK			Licheng
Liangwang West	梁王西				Licheng
Liangwang	梁王		19.50	19.50	Licheng
