= Jiyang Line =

Tram line in Jinan, China

- Jiyang Line
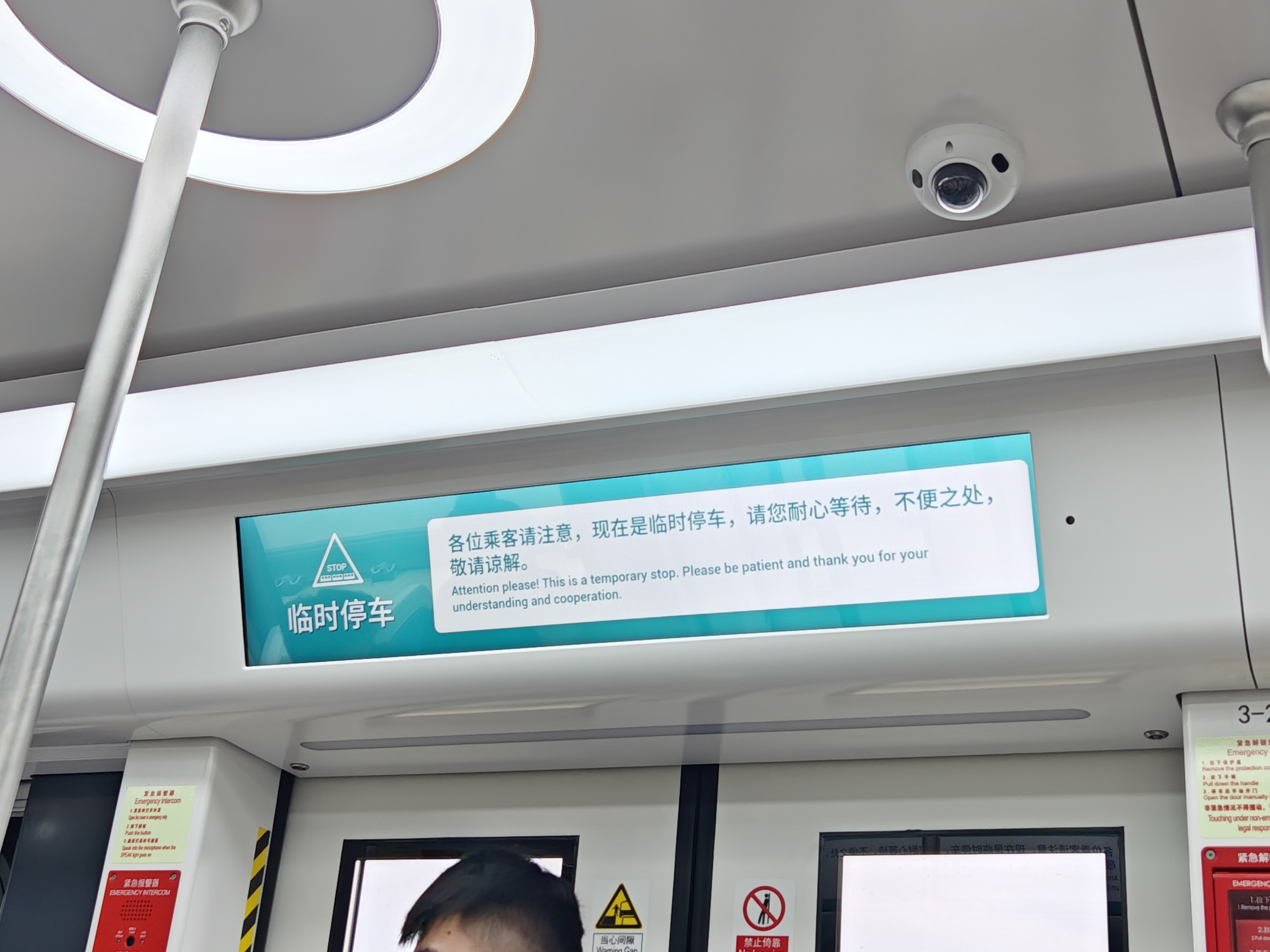
- Interior display screen of Jiyang Line

Overview
- Other name: Jiyang Tram
- Native name: 济阳线
- Status: Operational
- Owner: Jinan Rail Transit Group
- Locale: Jinan, Shandong, China
- Termini: Jinandong Railway Station; Jiyang North
- Stations: 16 (11 in operation)

Service
- Type: Tram / Light rail
- System: Jinan Metro
- Operator: Jinan Metro
- Depot: Jiyang North Depot (济阳北车辆段)
- Rolling stock: CRRC Qingdao Sifang 3-car Tram units

History
- Opened: 30 December 2025; 10 months ago

Technical
- Line length: 36.1 km (22.4 mi)
- Num of tracks: 2
- Track gauge: 1,435 mm (4 ft 8 1/2 in)
- Electrification: 750 V DC Overhead catenary
- Operating speed: 70 km/h (43 mph)
Route map
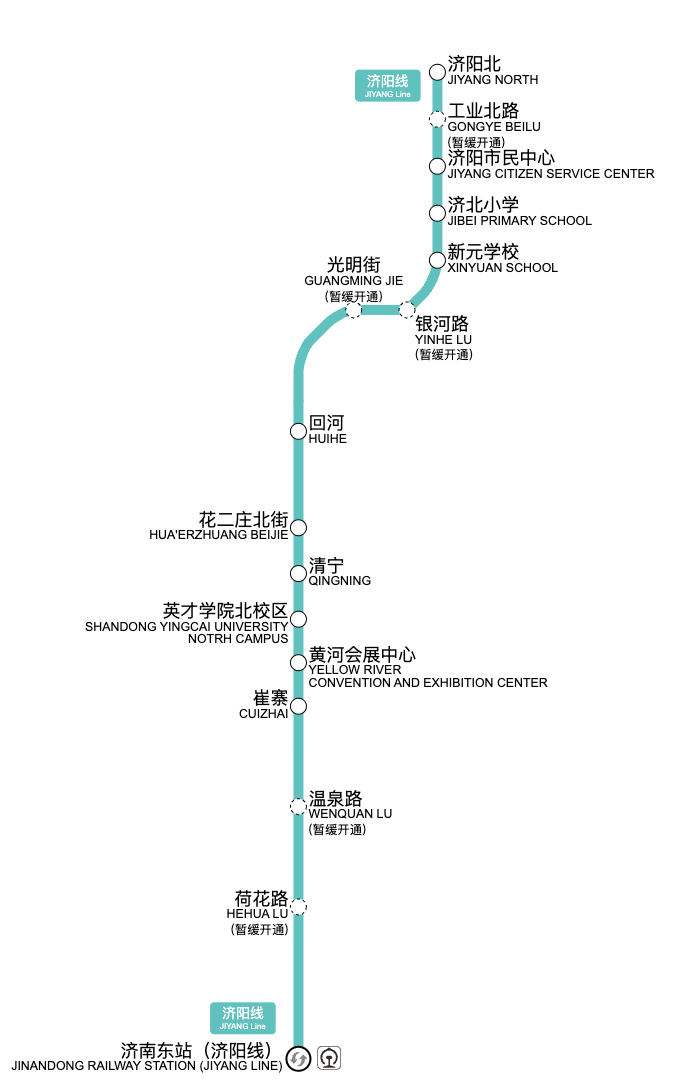

The Jiyang Line (Chinese: 济阳线), also known as Jiyang Tram, is the eighth line and also the first modern tram line of Jinan Metro system and also the first tram in operation in Shandong province. Construction was started on 27 September 2022 and opened for passenger service on 30 December 2025 at 10:00 am. The total length of this line is 36.1 km. The line will also be the first to cross the Yellow River in Shandong province. The project will cost a total of 6.65 billion yuan ($1.01 billion), and the average cost per kilometer will be 198 million yuan, less than the cost of a metro line.

== Stations ==
The operating hours are from 6:00 am to 8:50 pm for Jinandong Railway Station and from 6:30 am to 9:00 pm for Jiyang North.

The peak hours are from 6:00 am to 9:00 am and from 5:00 pm to 9:00 pm with 15 minute intervals on weekdays. Otherwise, trains run on schedule within 20 minute intervals.

The average distance between stations is 2.35 km (1.46 mi).

- OSI: Out of system interchange.
- - Station not opened.

Station name		Transfer	Structure Type	Distance km		Location
English	Chinese	Transfer	Structure Type	Distance km		Location
Jinandong Railway Station	济南东站	3 6 (Both OSI); MDK	Underground	0.00	0.00	Licheng
Hehua Lu	荷花路					Jiyang
Wenquan Lu	温泉路					Jiyang
Cuizhai	崔寨		Underground	11.50	11.50	Jiyang
Yellow River Convention and Exhibition Center	黄河会展中心		Underground	3.20	14.70	Jiyang
Shandong Yingcai University North Campus	英才学院北校区		Underground	4.50	19.20	Jiyang
Qingning	清宁		Underground	2.80	22.00	Jiyang
Hua'erzhuang Beijie	花二庄北街		Elevated	2.50	24.50	Jiyang
Huihe	回河		Elevated	3.00	27.50	Jiyang
Guangming Jie	光明街					Jiyang
Yinhe Lu	银河路					Jiyang
Xinyuan School	新元学校		Underground	2.20	29.70	Jiyang
Jibei Primary School	济北小学		Underground	2.10	31.80	Jiyang
Jiyang Citizen Service Center	济阳市民中心		Underground	1.80	33.60	Jiyang
Gongye Beilu	工业北路					Jiyang
Jiyang North	济阳北		At-grade	2.50	36.10	Jiyang

== Fares ==
A one-way fare is 2 CNY for all destination of this line.
