= 2025 Bangkok road collapse =

2025 Bangkok Road Collapse
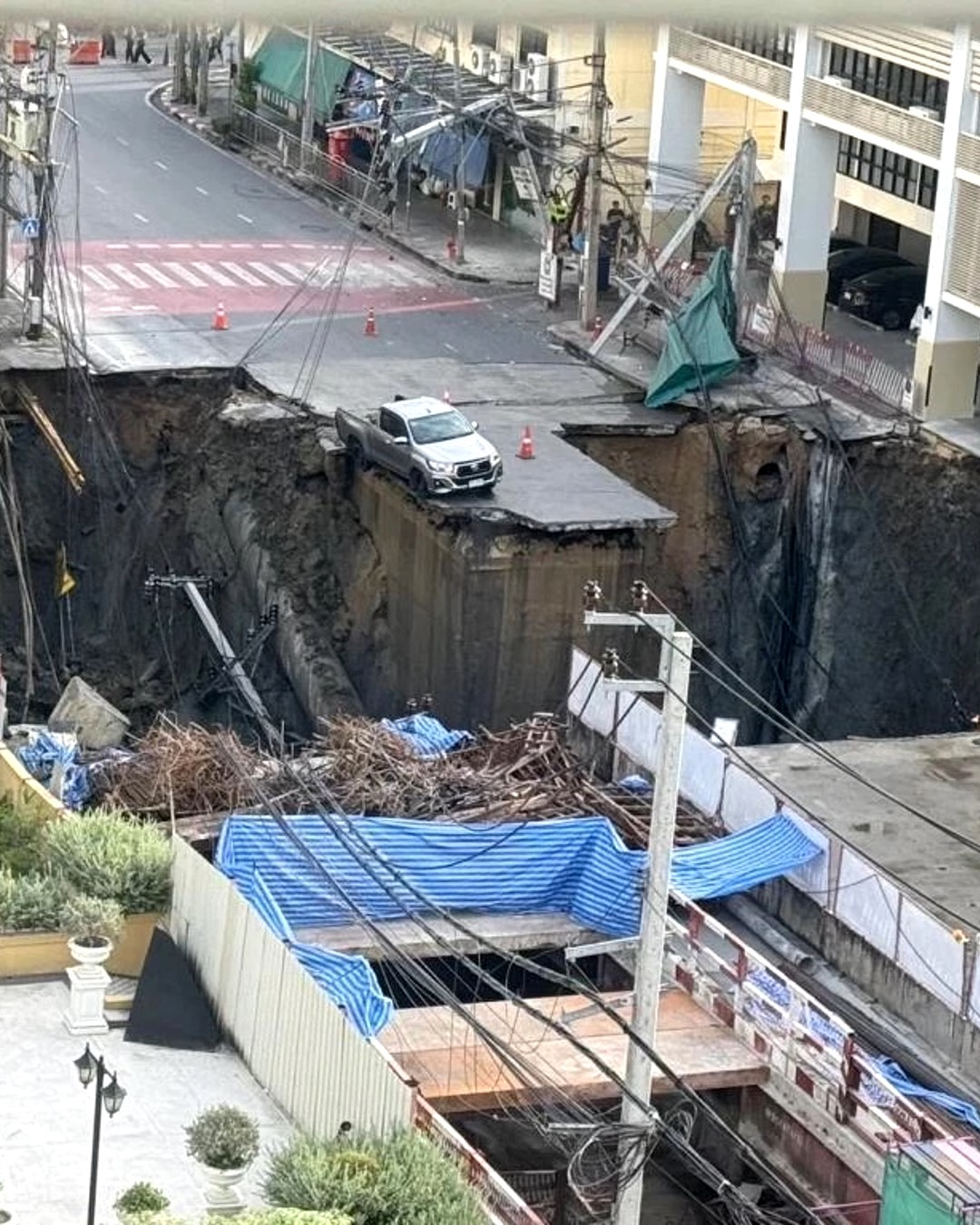
- Site of the collapsed Samsen Road
- Date: 24 September 2025; 9 months ago
- Time: 7:13 am ICT
- Location: Dusit, Bangkok; 13°46′49.8″N 100°30′33.9″E
- Type: Construction accident
- Cause: Soil erosion caused by the unfinished and unsecured section of the MRT purple line tunnel, which in turn damaged the underground sewer pipeline and worsening the erosion
- Deaths: 0
- Injuries: 0

In late September 2025, a significant ground collapse occurred on Samsen Road in the Dusit district of Bangkok, Thailand, adjacent to Vajira Hospital and the Samsen Police Station. The resulting sinkhole, which emerged at approximately 7:13 AM local time on 24 September, initially measured an estimated 30 meters in width and 50 meters in depth. This event caused severe structural damage and swallowing multiple vehicles, including a police tow truck. Prime Minister Anutin Charnvirakul estimated that repairs would take at least a year. While no casualties were reported, the incident led to the immediate suspension of utility services and evacuation of nearby buildings as authorities assessed further risks. Following the initial sinkhole collapse, reports confirmed continued ground instability and further subsidence in the affected area to 40 meters wide. Structural assessments revealed significant cracking and slight tilting in the foundation of the Samsen Police Station, raising concerns about potential structural failure if ground displacement persists.

As of October 5, the road is indefinitely closed.

The cause of the sinkhole was quickly identified as soil flowing into the nearby subway tunnel under construction, due to heavy rains and cracks forming in the tunnel itself. Responsibility for the design and construction of the tunnel and underground stations along the Taopoon–National Library section, covering a distance of 4.8 kilometers, lies with the contractor awarded Contract 1. This contract, valued at 19.43 billion baht (approximately S$778 million), is executed by the CKST-PL joint venture, which consists of CH. Karnchang and Anutin's Sino-Thai Engineering and Construction.

== Timeline of event ==
In the weeks leading up to the incident, underground construction for a subway tunnel was ongoing beneath Samsen Road in Bangkok's Dusit district. This area, known for its soft soil and susceptibility to subsidence, had also experienced heavy rainfall due to the ongoing monsoon season. Local authorities now believe that a leaking or burst underground water pipe may have contributed to soil erosion beneath the road surface, weakening the structural stability around the tunnel zone.

On the morning of September 24, 2025, the road in front of Vajira Hospital and the Samsen Police Station was closed off after police noticed water seeping onto the road's surface. An hour later, a massive sinkhole suddenly opened. The crater, measuring approximately 30 meters in width and 50 meters in depth, swallowed several vehicles, including a police tow truck, and caused the collapse of surrounding pavement and utility poles. Water and electricity services were immediately cut off to prevent further hazards. Emergency responders quickly evacuated nearby buildings, including parts of the hospital and police station. Despite the dramatic nature of the collapse, no fatalities or serious injuries were reported.

In the following two days, September 25 and 26, emergency crews worked intensively to stabilize the site. Over 50,000 sandbags and large stones were deployed to reinforce the area and redirect potential rainwater runoff. Engineers began pumping more than 500 cubic meters of concrete into the sinkhole to fill the void. However, the operation was disrupted when concrete began leaking into the subway tunnel beneath, indicating a breach in the tunnel wall. This led engineers to halt further filling and re-evaluate their approach to avoid additional structural damage or a secondary collapse.

As of September 27, 2025, the sinkhole site remains sealed off to the public, and Samsen Road is closed indefinitely. Monitoring equipment has been installed around the affected area to track any additional ground movement or signs of further subsidence. The police station and other nearby buildings are still under assessment, and temporary relocation of staff and services is ongoing. The Bangkok Metropolitan Administration has officially designated the area a disaster zone to streamline emergency funding and coordinate long-term repairs.

=== Recovery efforts ===
Media said that "3,800 cubic metres of sand [were dumped] into the sinkhole as of" Saturday night [5 October]. The subsequent phases of the recovery and reinforcement process, as outlined in collaboration with the engineering team, will incorporate a new, innovative method for stabilizing the area beneath the metro station. In contrast to traditional soil stabilization techniques, this approach involves the use of sprayed concrete, a more advanced technique designed to both reinforce the subsoil and prevent any further subsidence. Sprayed concrete will provide a strong, seamless layer, improving the overall stability and reducing the potential for future ground movement.

Following this initial application, the ground will be further reinforced with a sand and cement fill. This method not only serves as an intermediary material that enhances soil consolidation, but it also improves the load distribution properties of the underlying layers. By filling voids and compacting the material, this fill will help ensure that the surface remains stable under varying conditions. The next stage will involve applying a layer of crushed stone over the reinforced area. This new method, by integrating crushed stone, adds a level of durability and resilience to the surface, significantly improving the foundation's load-bearing capacity. The crushed stone will help facilitate drainage, reduce settlement, and provide additional stability to the area, ensuring that it can support both the metro station structure and the surrounding infrastructure.

Simultaneously, a comprehensive debris removal operation will take place, focusing on the clearance of obstacles such as transformers, broken concrete, and dislodged utility poles. This process not only clears the site for further construction but also contributes to the overall safety of the area by eliminating potential hazards.
