= Jinan East railway station =

Railway station in Jinan, China

Jinan East 济南东
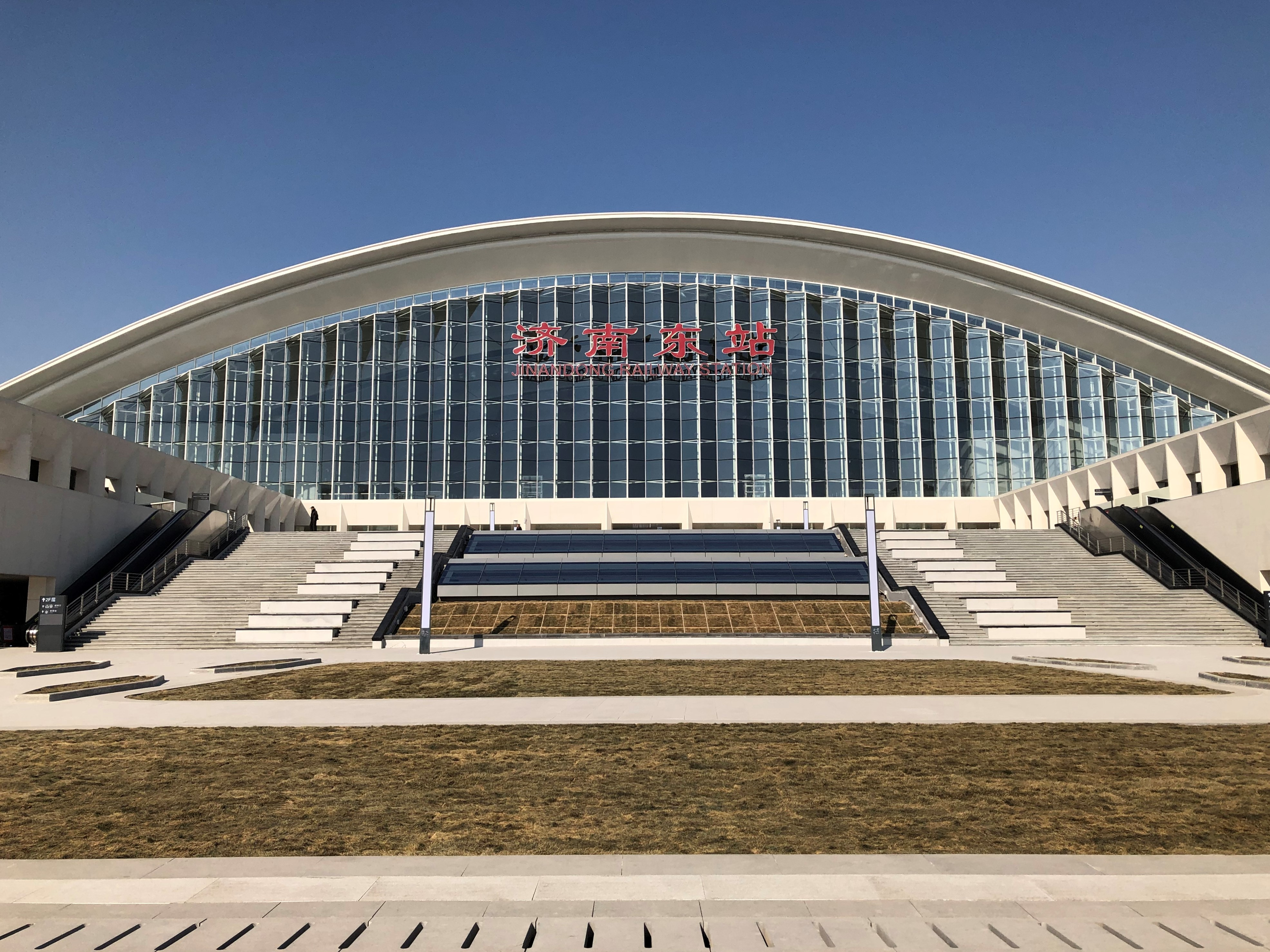
- Exterior of the station

General information
- Location: Licheng District, Jinan, Shandong; China
- Coordinates: 36°44′54″N 117°09′15″E
- Operated by: China Railway Jinan Group; China Railway Corporation
- Lines: Shijiazhuang–Jinan passenger railway; Jinan–Qingdao high-speed railway; Huangtai–Jinan East link line; Jinan–Laiwu high-speed railway; Jinan–Zaozhuang high-speed railway (under construction)

History
- Opened: 26 December 2018
Location

Jinan East railway station (Chinese: 济南东站; pinyin: Jǐnándōng zhàn) is a high-speed railway station in Licheng District, Jinan, the capital of Shandong province, China. The station is located on the east-west Jinan–Qingdao high-speed railway.

It is the third major station in Jinan, following Jinan railway station and Jinan West railway station.

== History ==
The station opened on 26 December 2018 with the Jinan–Qingdao high-speed railway.

== Future development ==
It will be served by Jinan–Zaozhuang high-speed railway in 2027.

== Metro station ==
It is served by a station on Line 3, Line 6 and Jiyang Line of the Jinan Metro.

Preceding station	China Railway High-speed	Following station
Qihe towards Shijiazhuang	Shijiazhuang–Jinan high-speed railway	Terminus
Terminus	Jinan–Qingdao high-speed railway	Zhangqiu North towards Qingdao North
