= Lixia, Jinan =

Lixia 历下区
- District
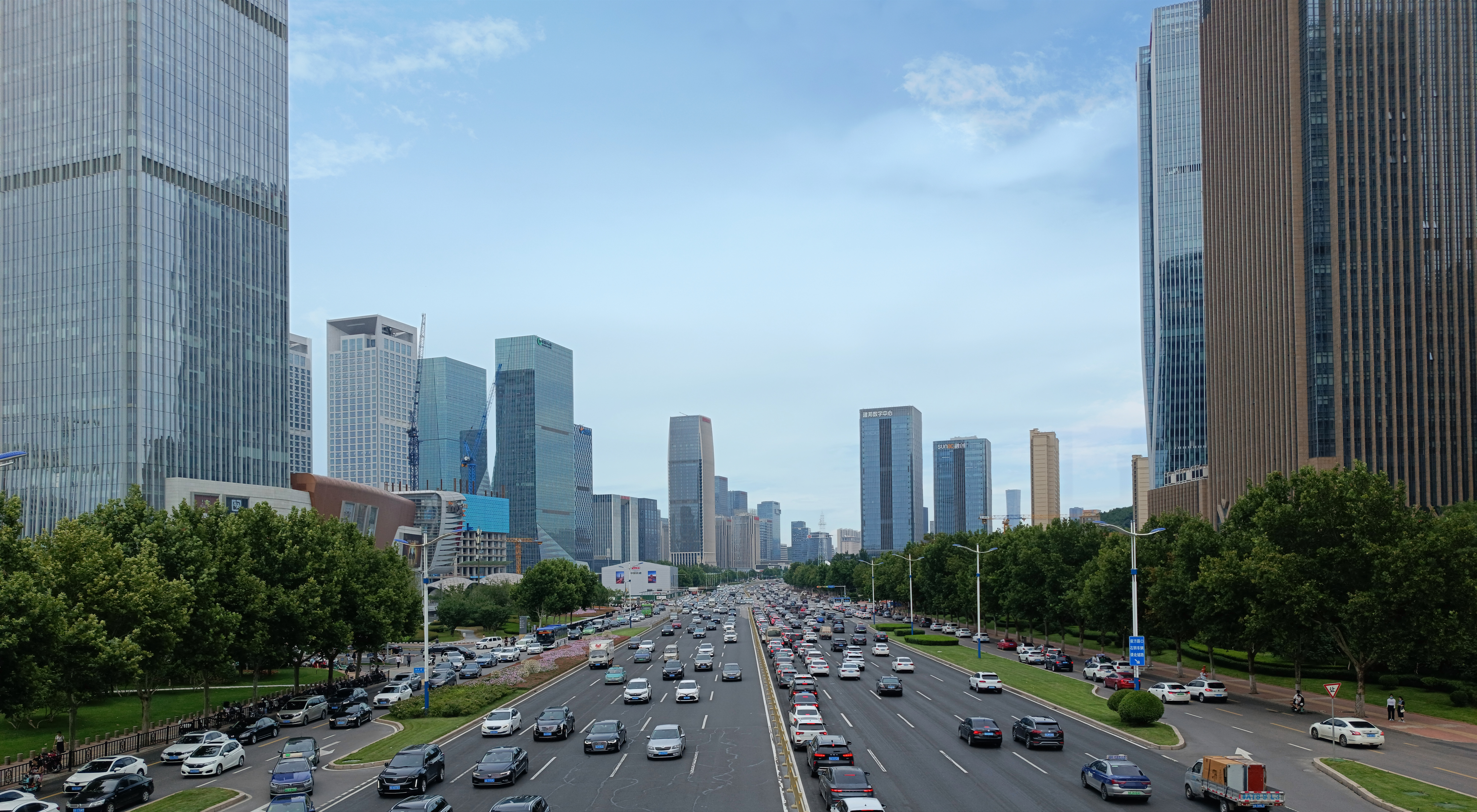
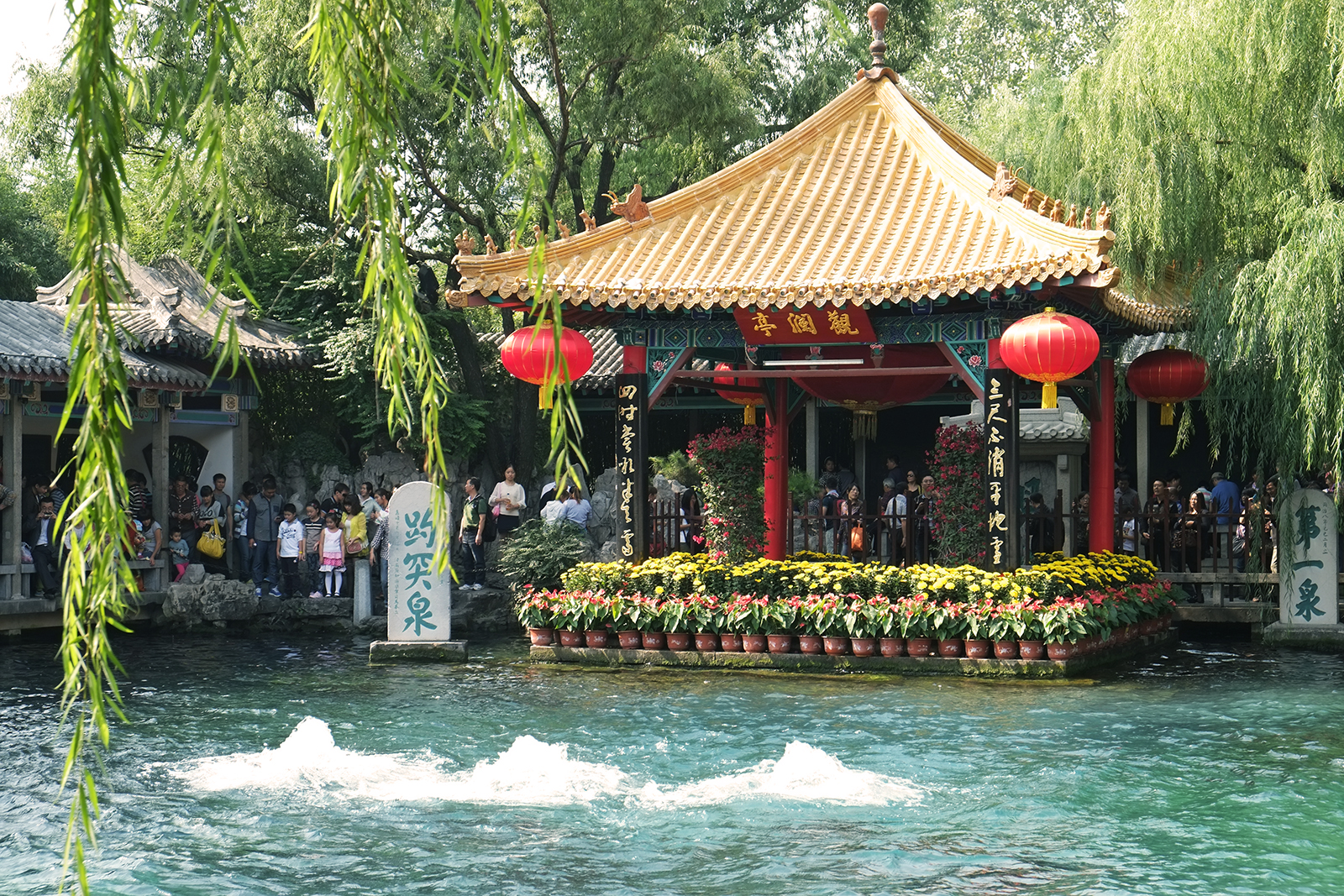
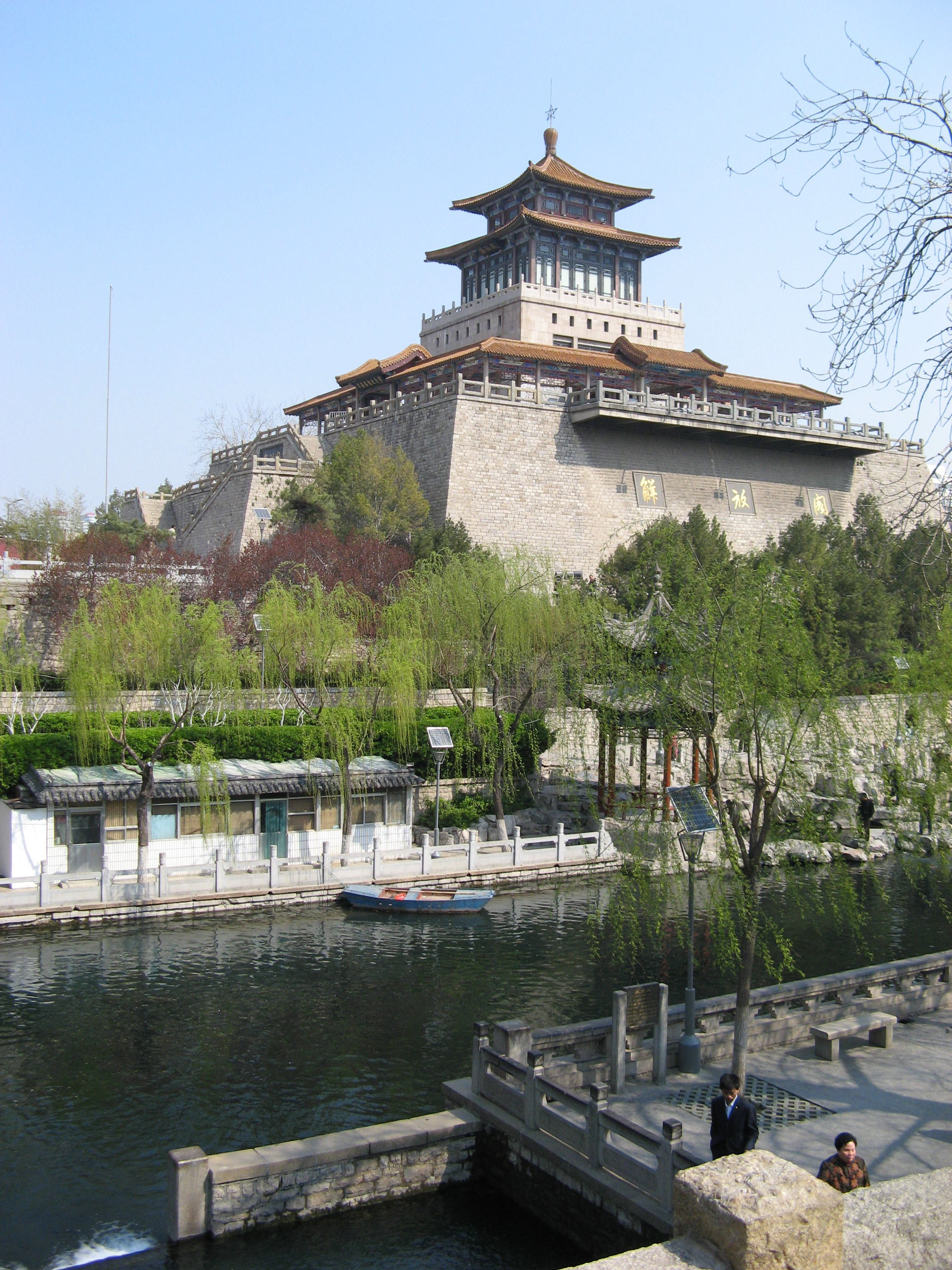
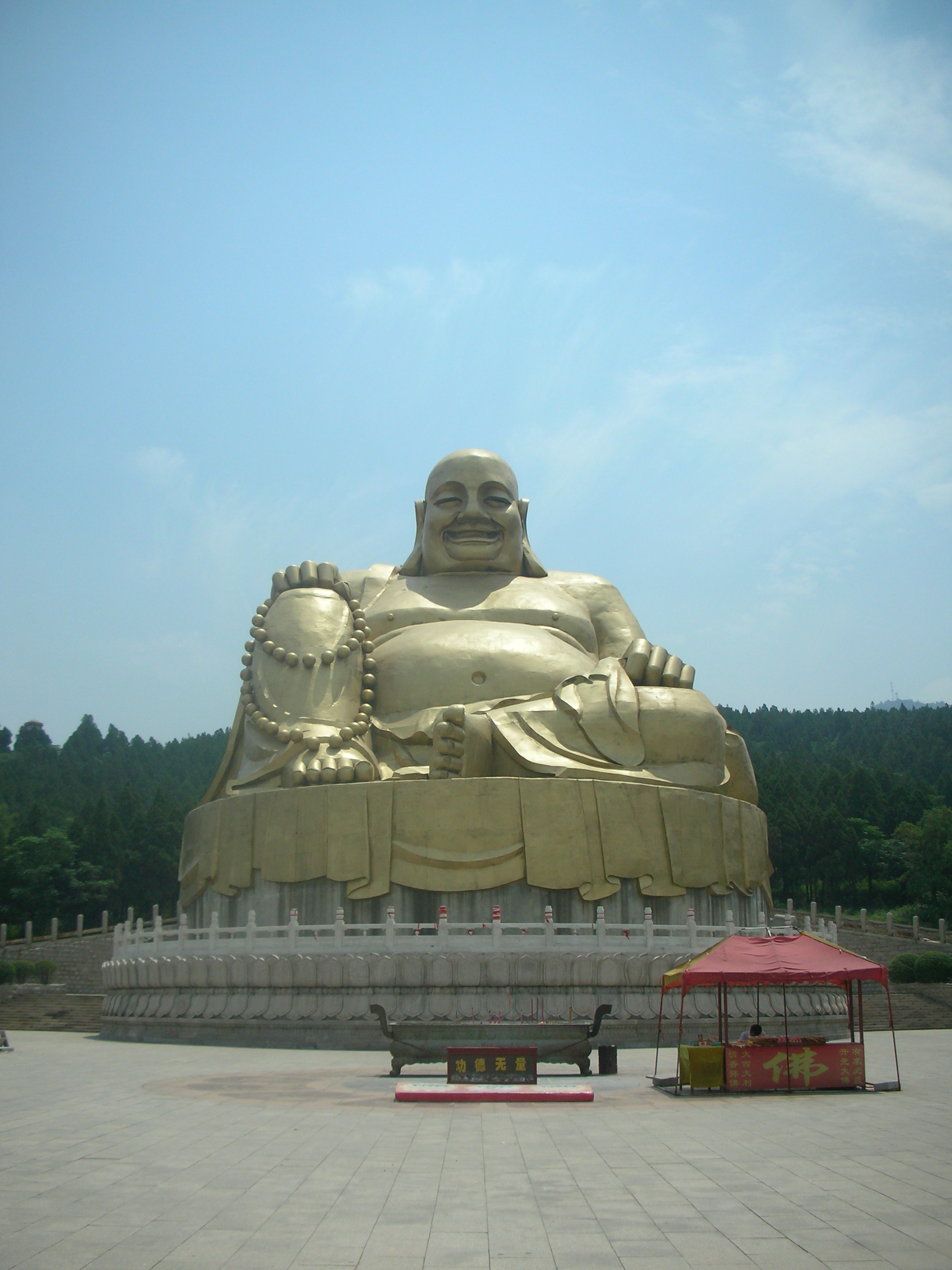
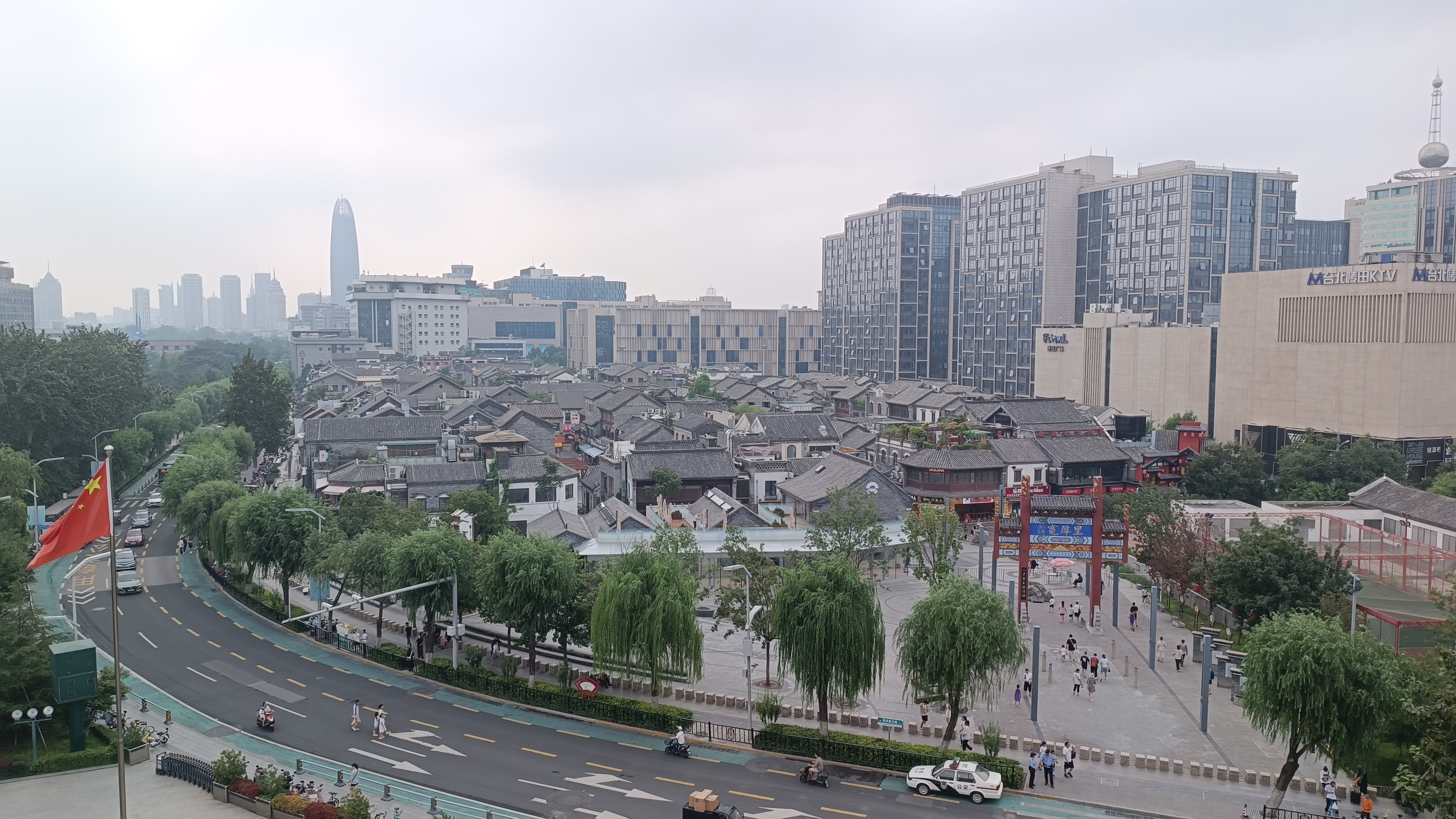
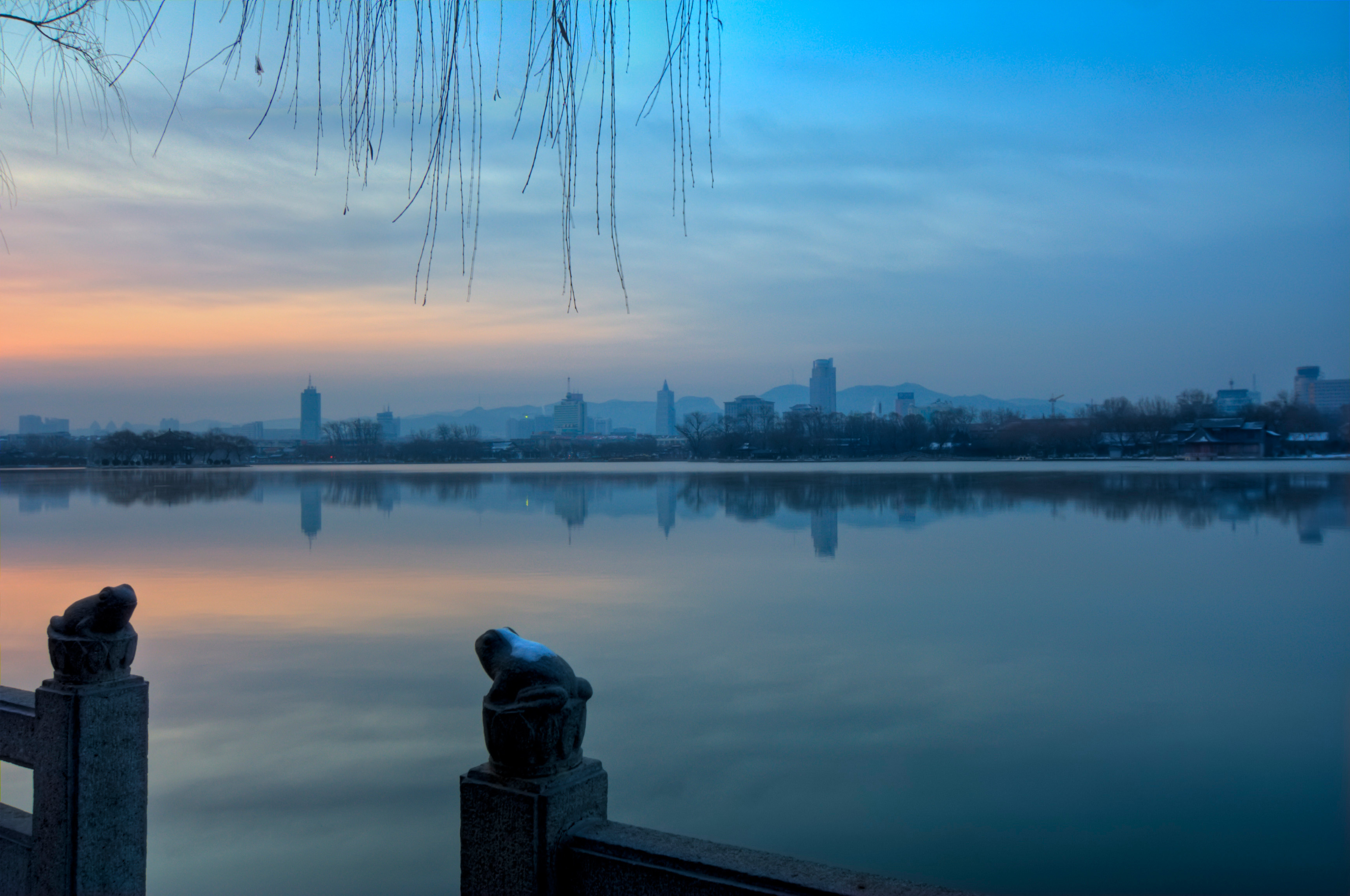
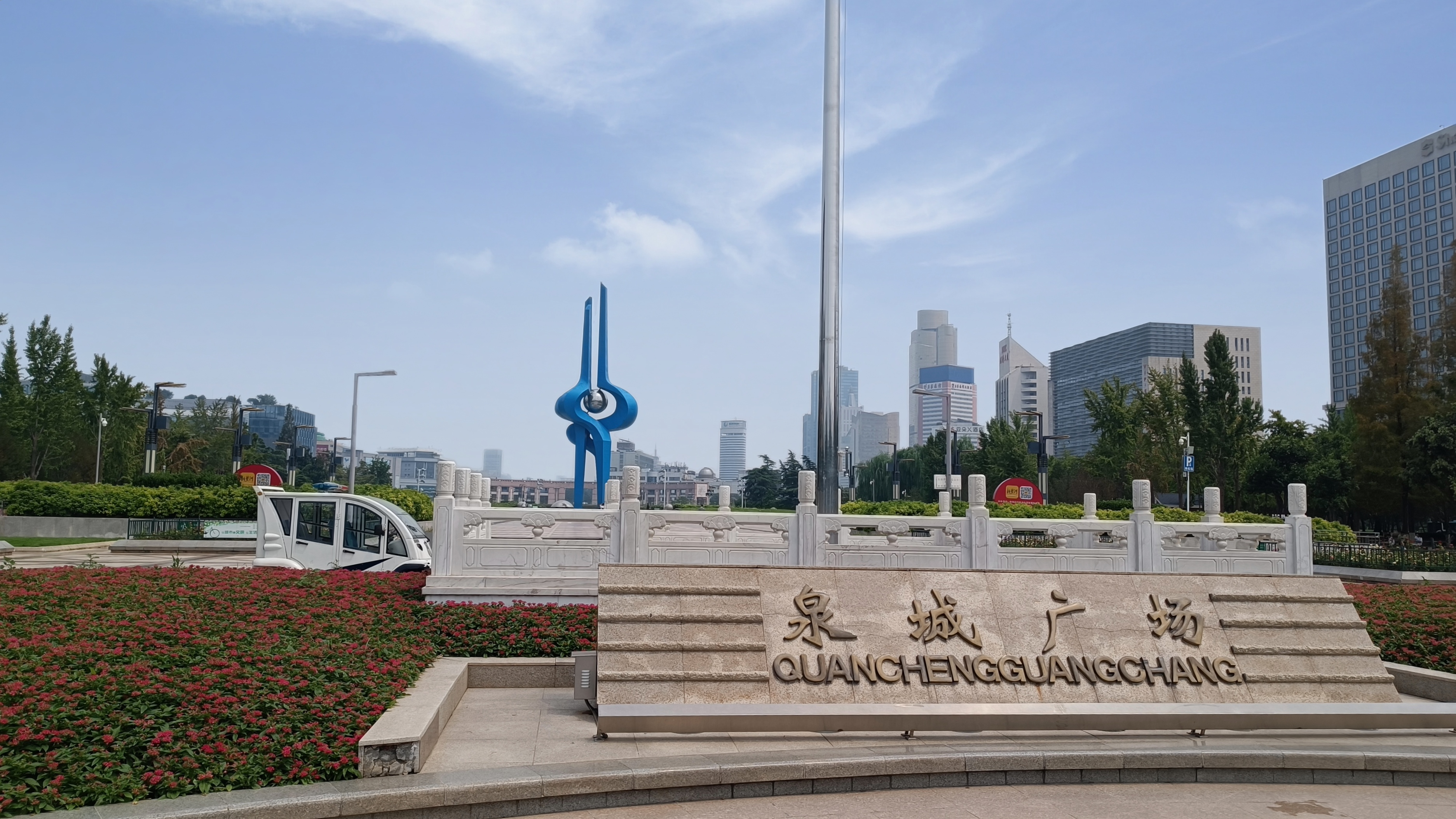
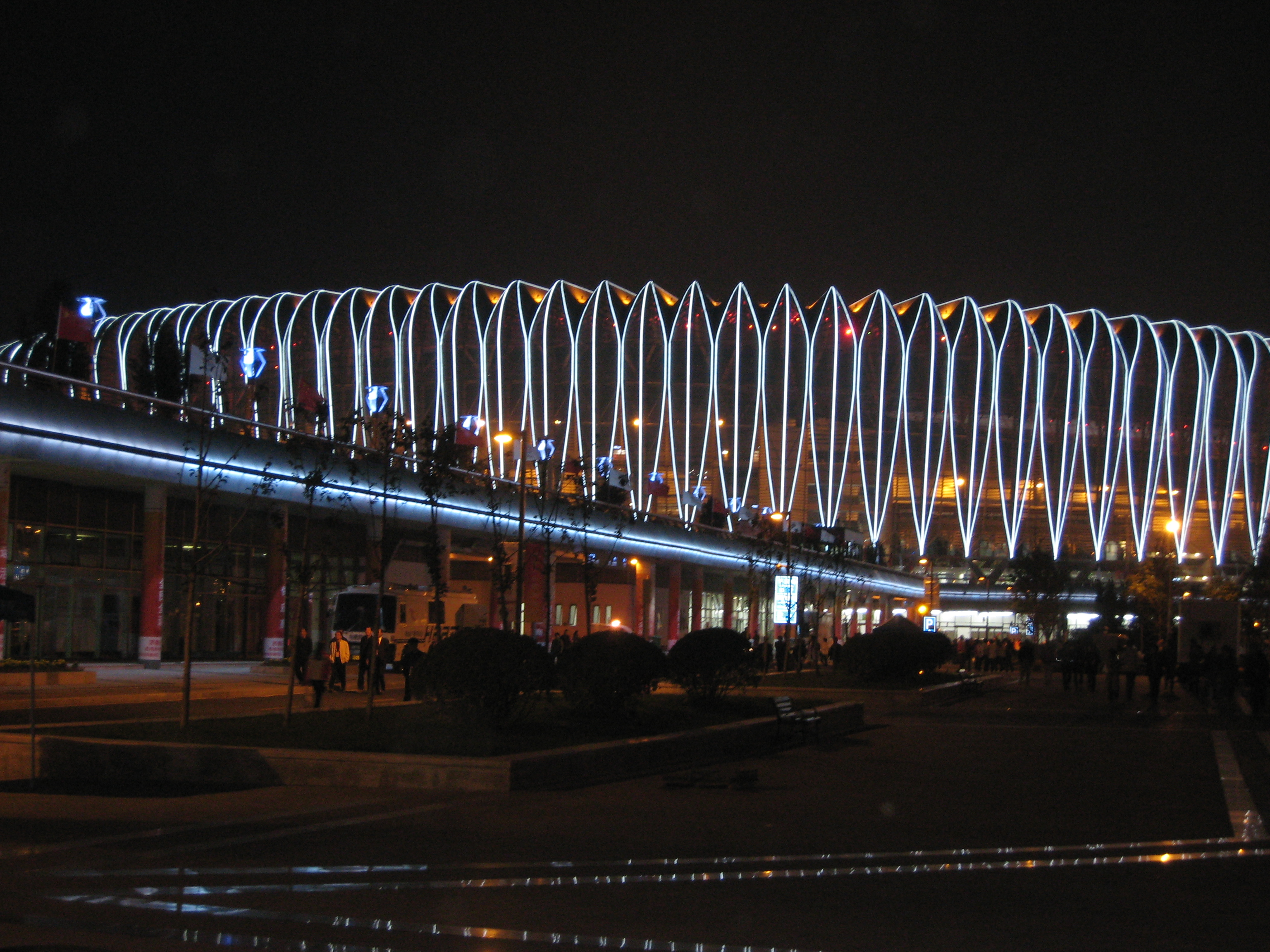
- Jinan CBD Baotu Spring Liberation Pavilion Chaoran Pagoda Thousand Buddha Mountain Kuanhouli Daming Lake Quancheng Square Jinan Olympic Sports Center

- Location in Shandong
- Coordinates: 36°39′58″N 117°04′40″E
- Country: People's Republic of China
- Province: Shandong
- Capital City: Jinan

Area
  - Total: 100.87 km^{2} (38.95 sq mi)

Population (2020)
  - Total: 784,900
  - Density: 7,781/km^{2} (20,150/sq mi)
- Time zone: UTC+8 (China Standard)
- Postal code: 250014

Lixia District (Chinese: 历下区; pinyin: Lìxià Qū) is one of 10 urban districts of the prefecture-level city of Jinan, the capital of Shandong Province. It is a sister city of Sacramento (the capital of California), and forms part of Jinan's urban core, where the CBD of Jinan located. The GDP (PPP) per capita reached US$56,429 (by 2023), surpassing Italy, France and the United Kingdom, and exceeded most developed countries.

== History ==
Lixia was named in 770 BC (during the Spring and Autumn and the Warring States period), belonged to Qi State, since it down to the Mt. Lishan (歷山), so it takes the name of Li (歷, "Mt. Lishan") Xia (下, "foot").

In 153 BC, Licheng County was established, with Lixia as its administrative center. In the 310s, the administrative center of Jinan Commandery moved from Dongpoingling (today in eastern Jinan) to Lixia, and it became the center of the prefecture since then.

During Ming and Qing dynasties, Lixia was the seat of three levels of government—Licheng County, Jinan Prefecture, as well as Shandong Province. After the Republic of China was founded in 1911, traditional administrative divisions were abolished, and in 1929, core area of Licheng County was sliced out and together formed the City of Jinan (as district one to four). District one was named Lixia District in September 1955. During the Cultural Revolution, it was renamed as the Red Guard District (红卫区).

== Administrative divisions ==
As of 2012, this district is divided to 13 subdistricts.

Subdistricts

- Jiefanglu Subdistrict (解放路街道)
- Qianfoshan Subdistrict (千佛山街道)
- Baotuquan Subdistrict (趵突泉街道)
- Quanchenglu Subdistrict (泉城路街道)
- Daminghu Subdistrict (大明湖街道)
- Dongguan Subdistrict (东关街道)
- Wendong Subdistrict (文东街道)
- Jianxin Subdistrict (建新街道)
- Dianliu Subdistrict (甸柳街道)
- Yanshan Subdistrict (燕山街道)
- Yaojia Subdistrict (姚家街道)
- Longdong Subdistrict (龙洞街道)
- Zhiyuan Subdistrict (智远街道)

== Education ==
Lixia district is the home of many colleges and universities, such as:

- Shandong University
- Shandong Normal University
- Shandong University of Traditional Chinese Medicine
- Qilu University of Technology
- Shandong University of Finance and Economics
- Shandong University of Political Science and Law
- Shandong Police College
- Shandong University of Arts
- Shandong Theatre Academy
- Shandong Sport University
