= Licheng, Jinan =

Licheng 历城区
- District
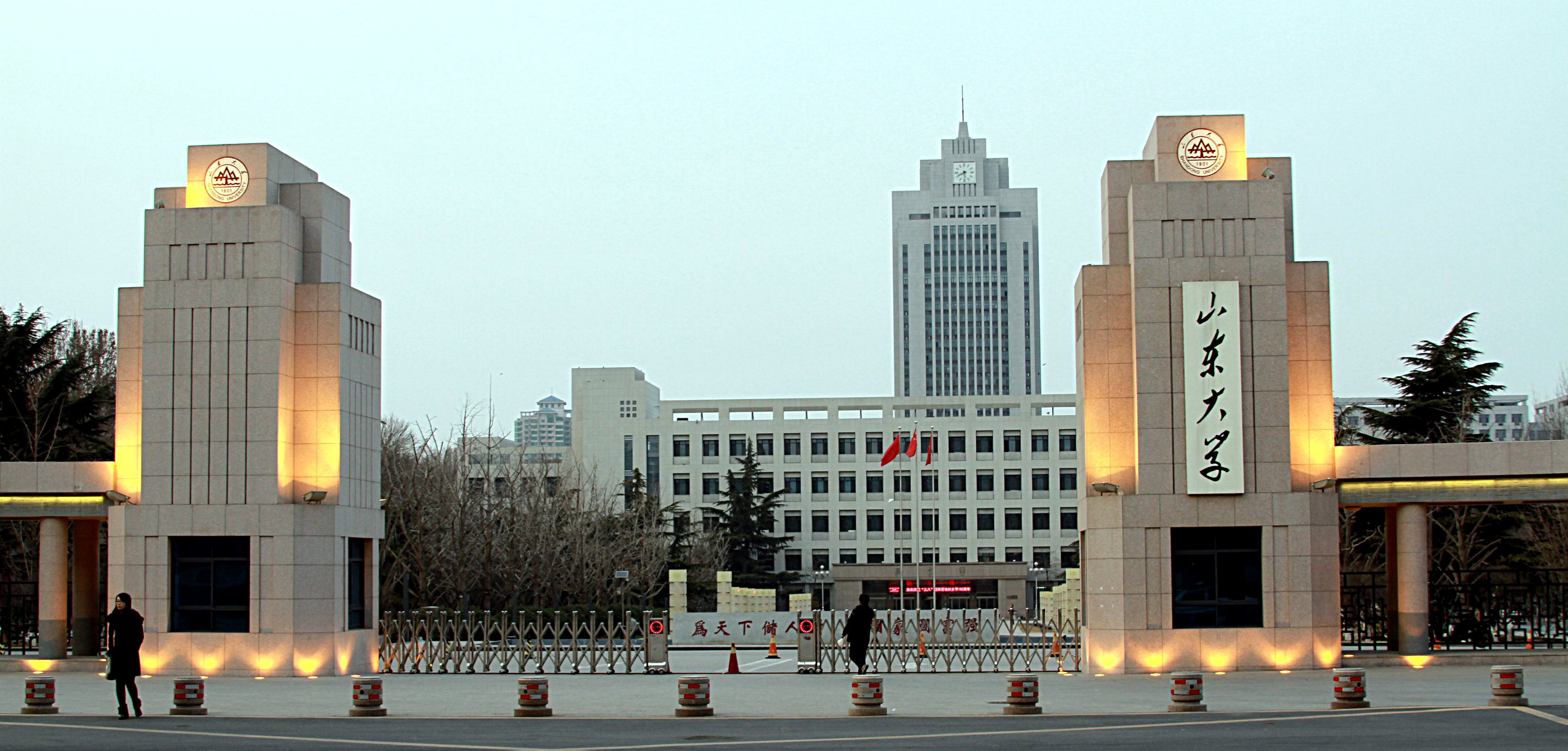
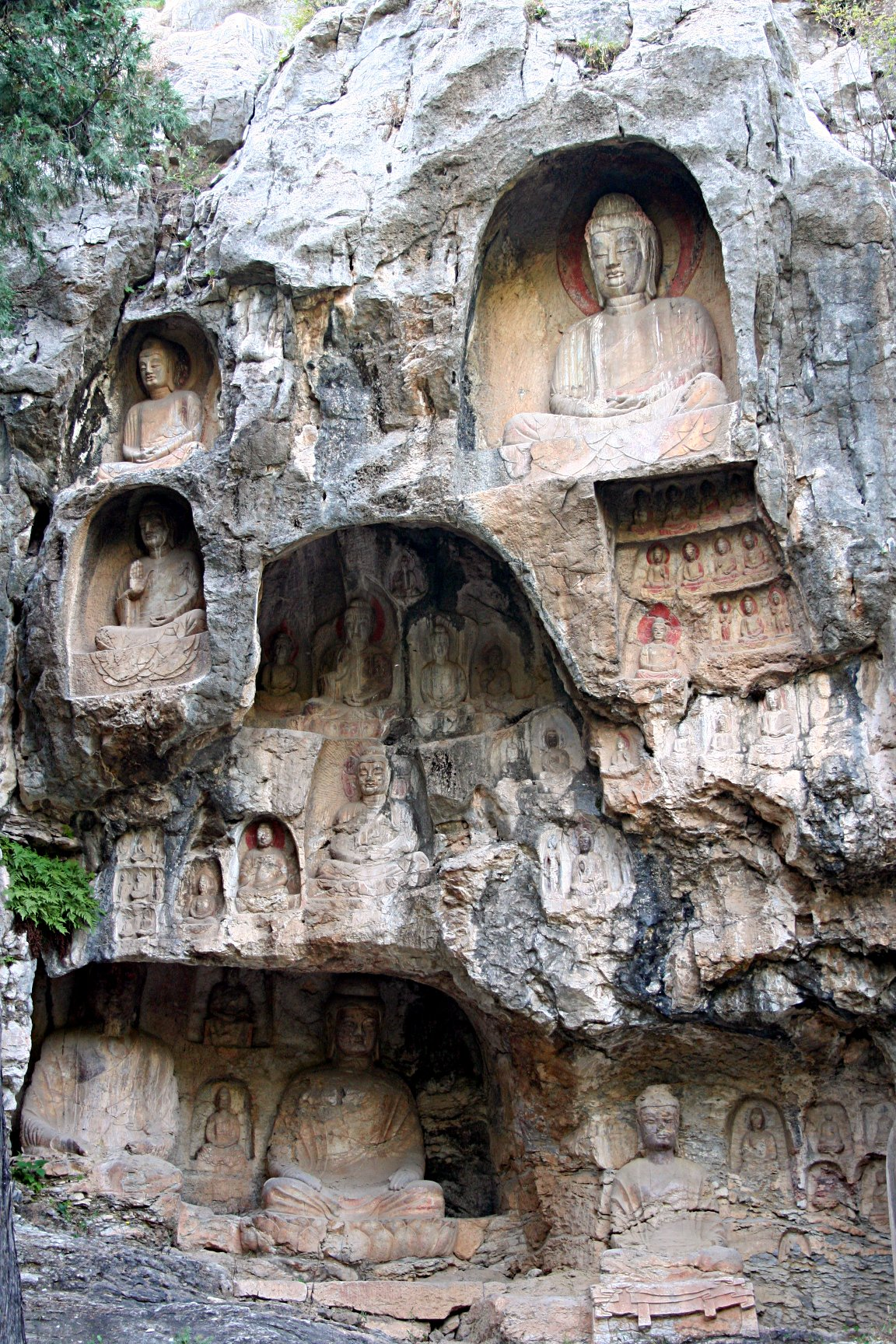
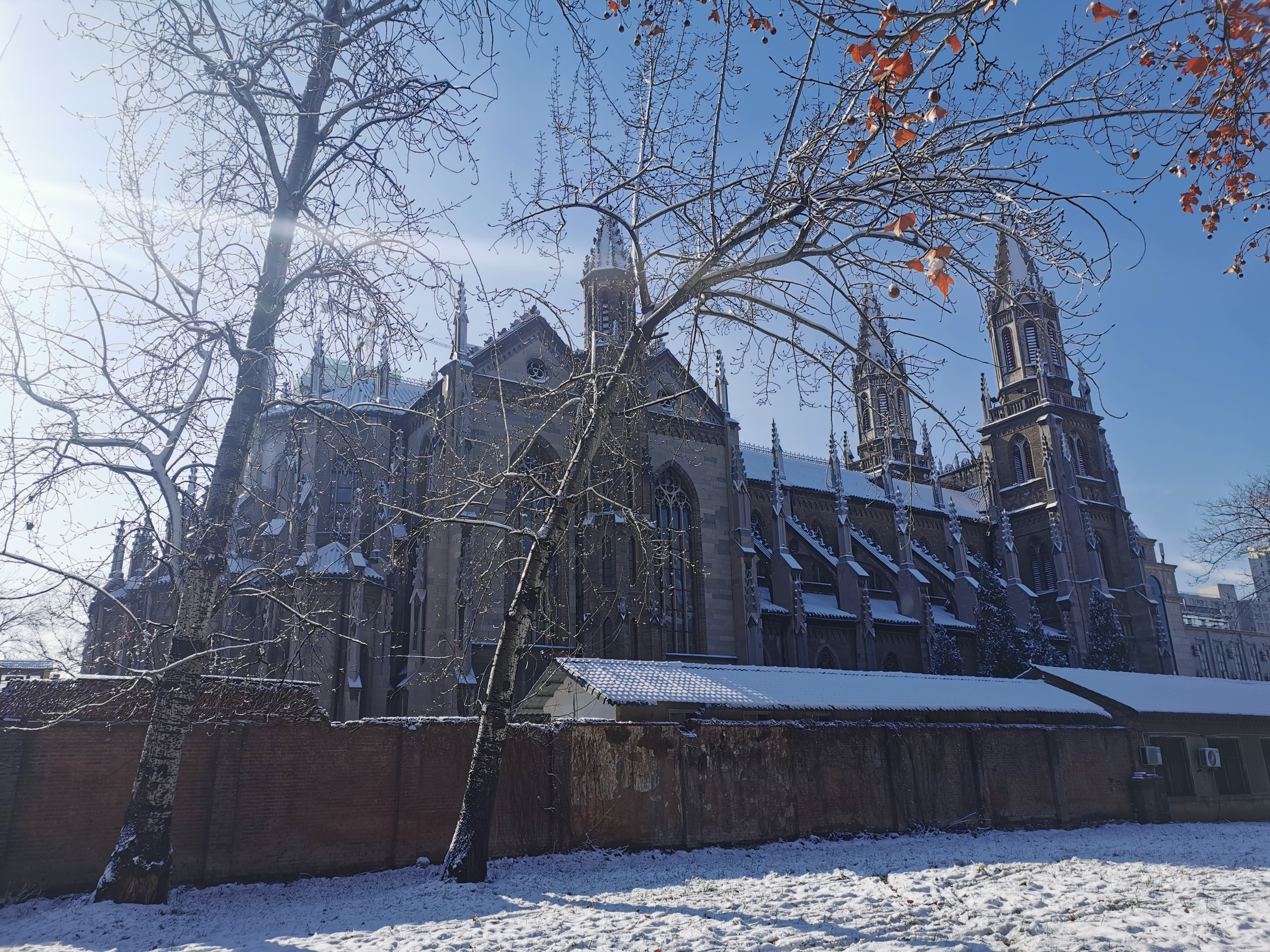
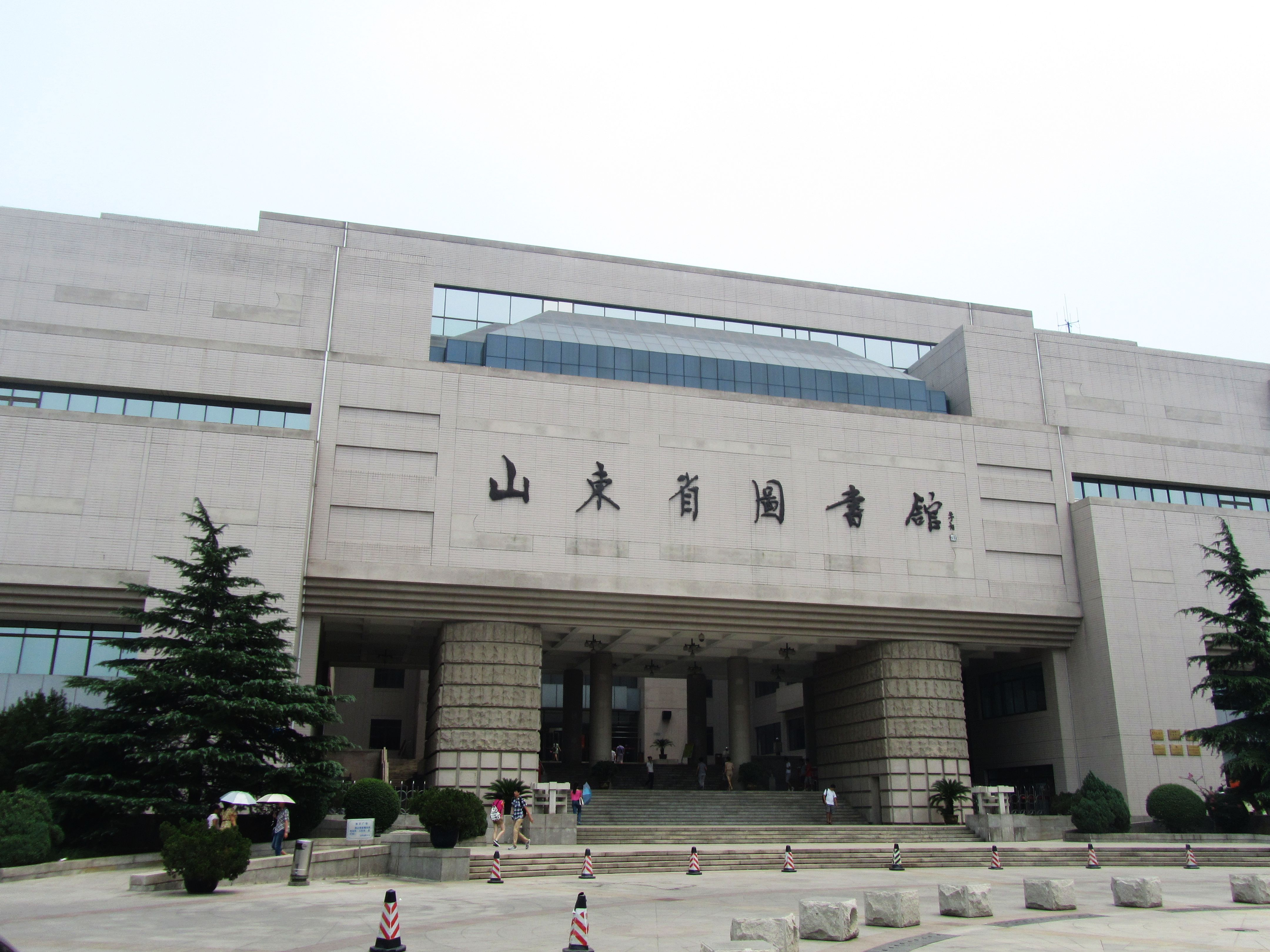
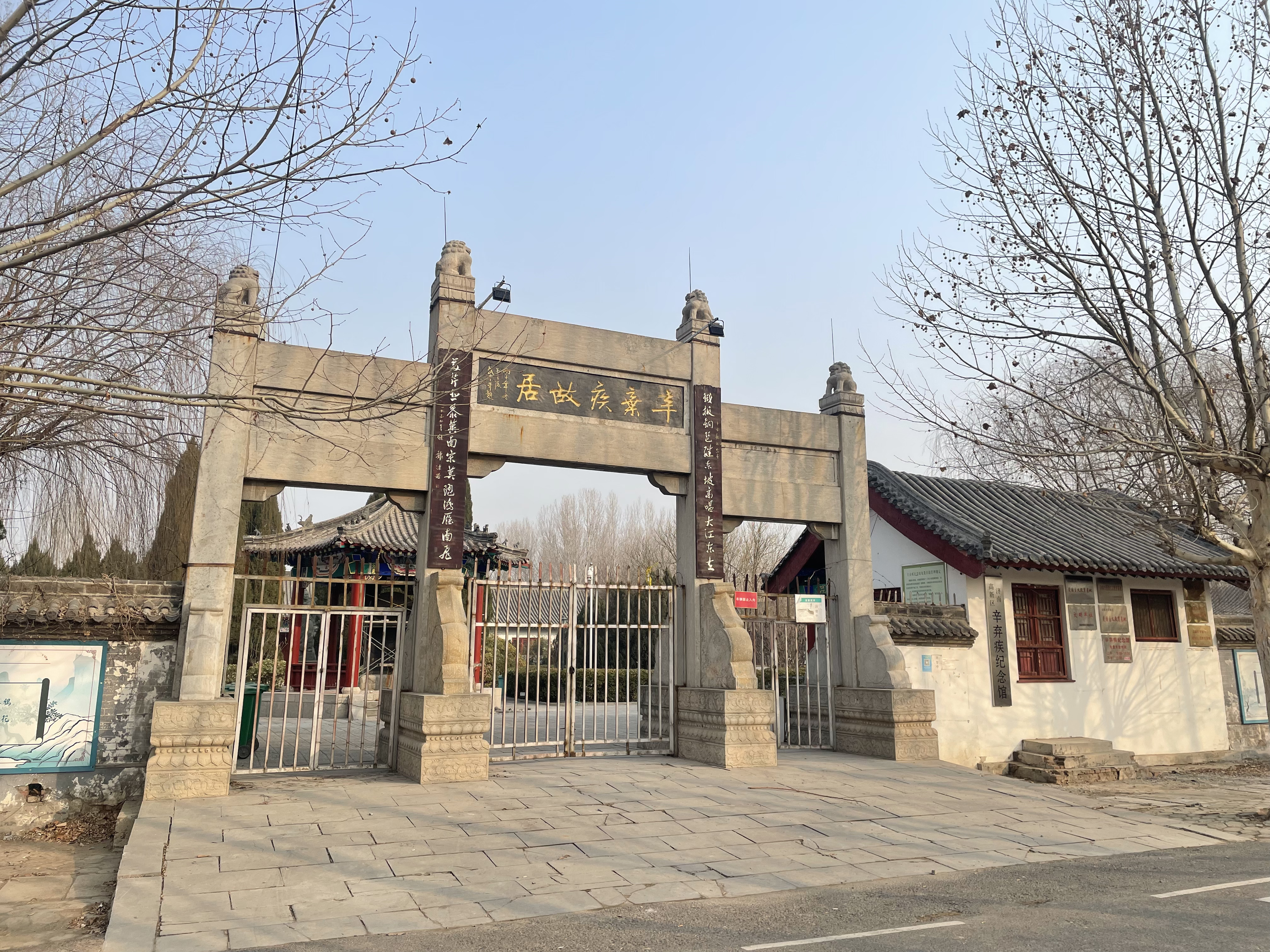
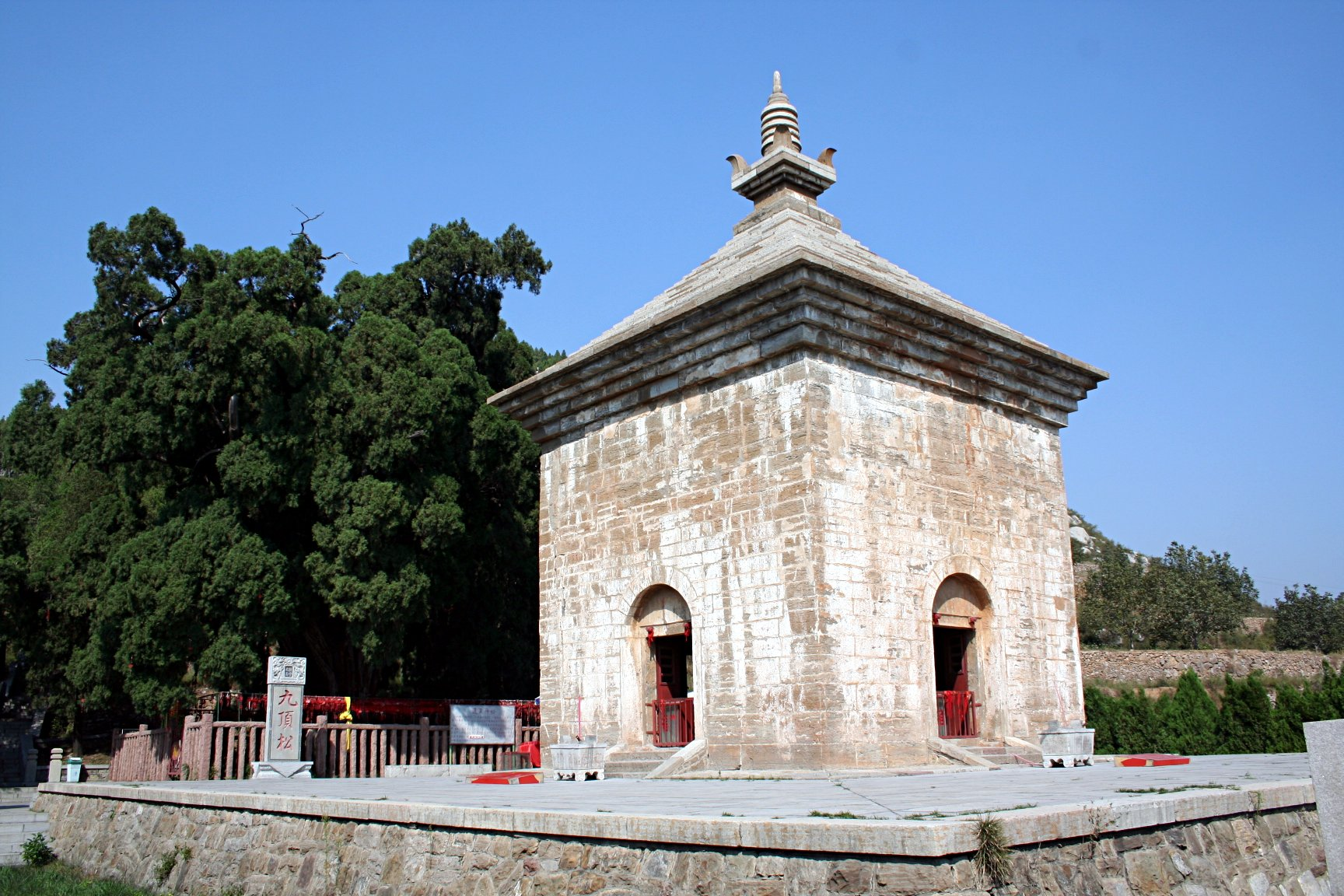
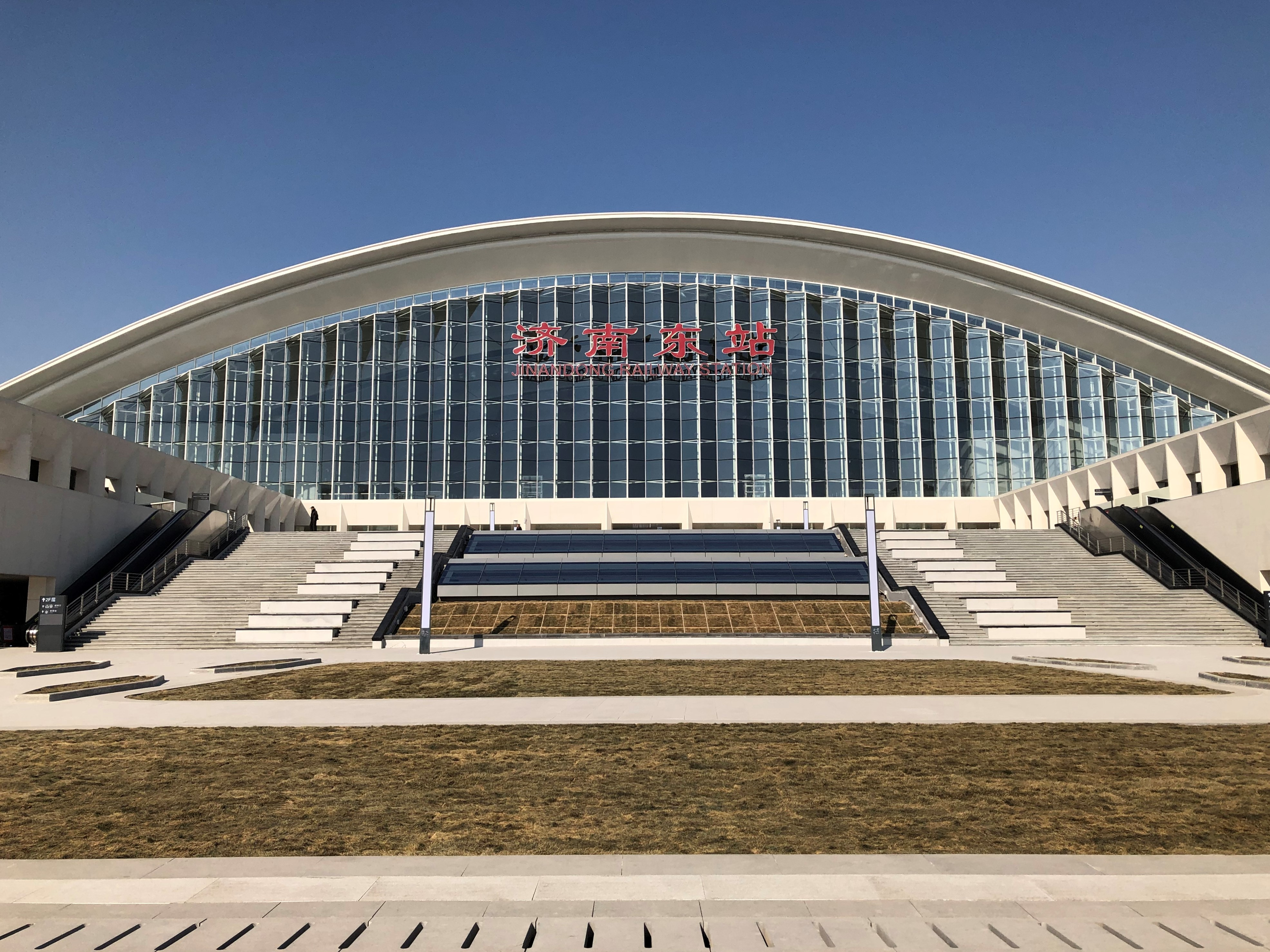
- Shandong University Central Campus Thousand-Buddha Cliff Honglou Sacred Heart Cathedral Shandong Provincial Library Xin Qiji Memorial Hall Four Gates Pagoda Jinandong Railway Station

- Location in Shandong
- Coordinates: 36°41′18″N 117°04′54″E
- Country: People's Republic of China
- Province: Shandong
- Sub-provincial city: Jinan

Area
  - Total: 1,303.88 km^{2} (503.43 sq mi)

Population (2018)
  - Total: 1,033,500
  - Density: 792.63/km^{2} (2,052.9/sq mi)
- Time zone: UTC+8 (China Standard)
- Postal code: 250100

Licheng District (simplified Chinese: 历城区; traditional Chinese: 歷城區; pinyin: Lìchéng Qū) is one of 10 urban districts of the prefecture-level city of Jinan, the capital of Shandong Province, East China, covering part of the eastern suburbs. It has an area of 1,303.88 km^{2} and has 1,124,306 permanent residents as of 2010. The Jinan Yaoqiang International Airport is located in the district's northern reaches. The largest county-level division of Jinan by permanent resident population, it borders Zhangqiu District to the east, Changqing District to the southwest, the districts of Shizhong, Lixia, and Tianqiao to the west, Jiyang District to the northwest, as well as the prefecture-level city of Tai'an to the southeast.

== Administrative divisions ==
As of 2012, this district is divided to 6 subdistricts and 11 towns.

Subdistricts

- Shandalu Subdistrict (山大路街道)
- Hongjialou Subdistrict]] (洪家楼街道)
- Dongfeng Subdistrict (东风街道)
- Quanfu Subdistrict (全福街道)
- Suncun Subdistrict (孙村街道)
- Juyehe Subdistrict (巨野河街道)

Towns

- Zhonggong (仲宫镇)
- Ganggou (港沟镇)
- Liubu (柳埠镇)
- Guodian (郭店镇)
- Dongjia (董家镇)
- Tangwang (唐王镇)
- Yaoqiang (遥墙镇)
- Wangsheren (王舍人镇)
- Huashan (华山镇)
- Xiying (西营镇)
- Caishi (彩石镇)

== See also ==
- Nine Pinnacle Pagoda
