= Memorial for Premier Zhou's inspection of the Loukou Yellow River Railway Bridge =

Coordinates: 36.72319°N 116.99960°E

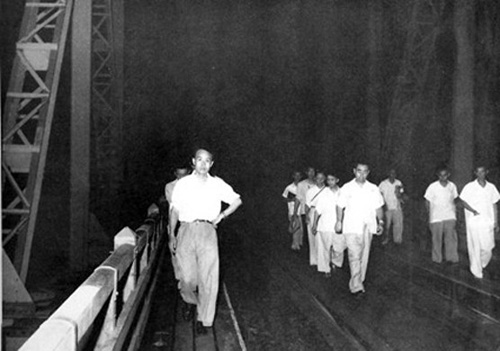
Premier Zhou Enlai (center) on the bridge.

The Memorial for Premier Zhou's inspection of the Loukou Yellow River Railway Bridge (Chinese: 周总理视察泺口黄河铁路桥纪念地; pinyin: Zhōu zǒnglǐ shìchá luòkǒu huánghé tiělùqiáo jìniàndì) is a major historical site protect by Shandong Province in Tianqiao District of Jinan, Shandong, China. It commemorates the visit by Premier Zhou Enlai to the Luokou Yellow River Railway Bridge during the 1958 Yellow River flood on August 6, 1958. The bridge was defended against the flood successfully. The site has been listed as a protected by Shandong province since December 23, 1977 (site number 1-03).

== See also ==
- List of sites in Jinan
- Major historical and cultural sites protected by Shandong Province
