= Line 4 (Jinan Metro) =

Rapid transit line in Jinan, China

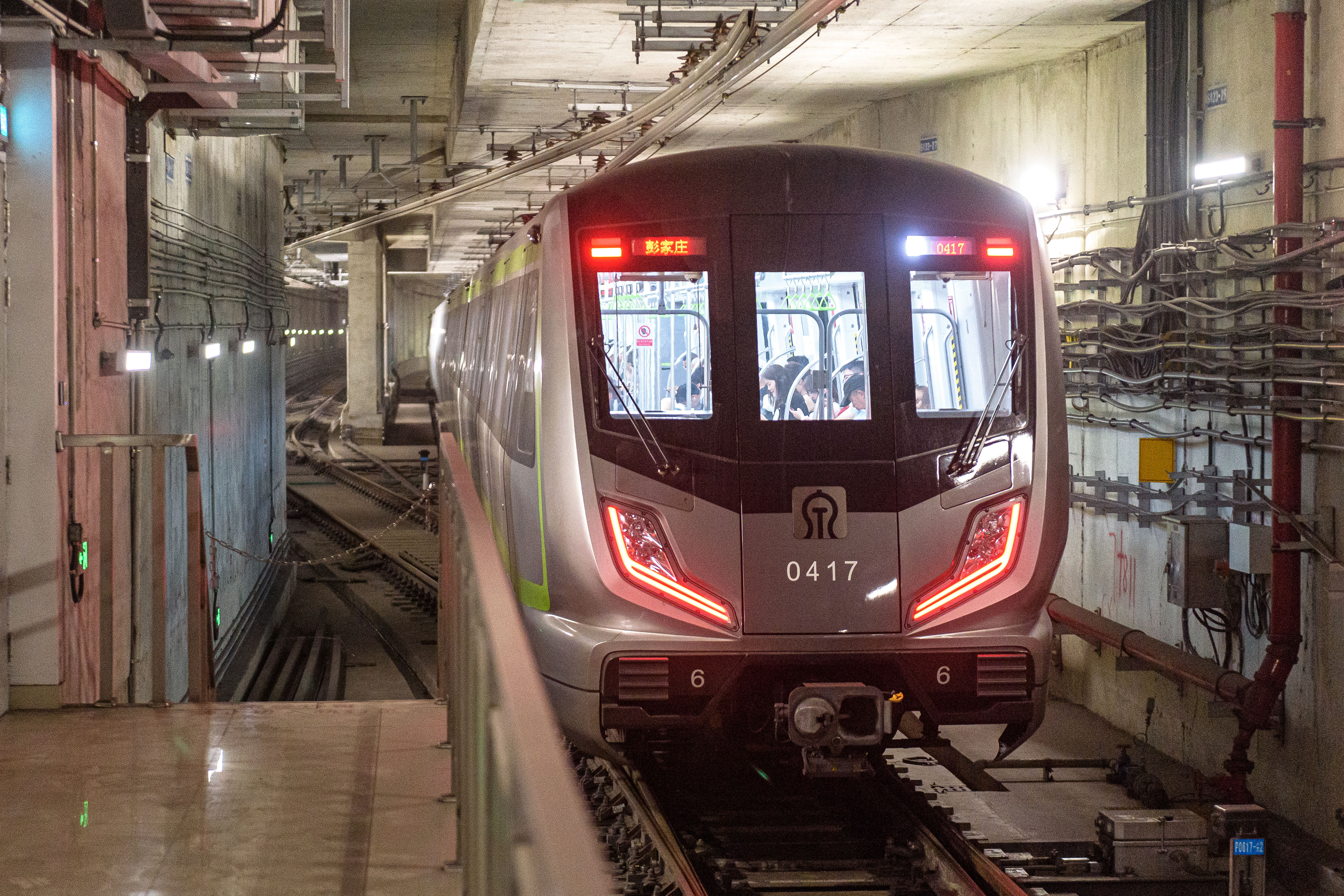
- Line 4 train leaving Lashan station

Overview
- Native name: 济南轨道交通4号线
- Status: Operational
- Owner: Jinan Rail Transit Group
- Locale: Jinan, Shandong, China
- Termini: Shandong First Medical University; Pengjiazhuang
- Stations: 33

Service
- Type: Rapid transit
- System: Jinan Metro
- Operator(s): Jinan Metro
- Depot(s): Tangye North Depot; Lizhuang Depot
- Rolling stock: CRRC Qingdao Sifang 6-car Type A trains

History
- Opened: 27 December 2025; 5 months ago

Technical
- Line length: 40.2 km (25.0 mi)
- Number of tracks: 2
- Track gauge: 1,435 mm (4 ft 8 1/2 in)
- Electrification: Overhead catenary, 1.5 kV DC
- Operating speed: 80 km/h (50 mph)

Jinan Metro Line 4 (Chinese: 济南轨道交通4号线) is a rapid transit line of Jinan Metro system. Construction of Line 6 first phase started on 6 March 2021. It officially opened for passenger service on 27 December 2025 at 10:15 am, with Line 6 east section and Line 8. The line spans 40.2 km long, all 33 stations are underground. And it is also the longest line of Jinan Metro system, serving the most densely populated areas, it connects key areas including the old downtown, the Central Business District, and Tangye New district.

== Stations ==
Through service with Line 8 are available before 8 pm.

Station name		Transfer	Distance km		Location
English	Chinese	Transfer	Distance km		Location
Shandong First Medical University	山东第一医科大学		0.00	0.00	Huaiyin
Chunfeng Yuedong Gongyuan	春风悦动公园				Huaiyin
Jinanxi Railway Station West Square	济南西站西广场	JGK			Huaiyin
Dayang	大杨	1			Huaiyin
Lashanhe Gongyuan	腊山河公园				Huaiyin
Lashan	腊山	2			Huaiyin
Duandian	段店				Huaiyin
Yingshi Jie	营市街				Huaiyin
Nanxinzhuang	南辛庄				Huaiyin
Wuli Paifang	五里牌坊				Huaiyin
Bayi Lijiaoqiao	八一立交桥				Shizhong
Shandong Sports Center	省体育中心				Shizhong
Quancheng Gongyuan	泉城公园				Lixia
Qianfo Mountain	千佛山				Lixia
Shanshi Donglu	山师东路				Lixia
Shandalu South	山大路南口				Lixia
Yanshan Lijiaoqiao	燕山立交桥				Lixia
Jiangshuiquan Lu	浆水泉路				Lixia
Shandong Museum	山东博物馆				Lixia
Zhuanshan Xilu (MIXC)	转山西路(万象城)				Lixia
Olympic Sports Center	奥体中心	3			Lixia
Aoti Donglu	奥体东路				Lixia
Shuntai Guangchang	舜泰广场				Lixia
Hanyu Jingu	汉峪金谷				Lixia
Linjiazhuang	林家庄				Lixia
Gold Industrial Park	黄金产业园				Licheng
Wenlvcheng	文旅城				Licheng
Xingcun Lijiaoqiao West	邢村立交桥西				Licheng
Xingcun Lijiaoqiao East	邢村立交桥东	8 (Through service before 8 pm); 4 (Branch)			Licheng
↓ Before 8 pm, Through service via Line 8 toward Qingyuan Dajie
Line 4 Terminus (at Tangye Branch)
Xingcun Lijiaoqiao East	邢村立交桥东	8; 4 (Main)			Licheng
Tangye South	唐冶南				Licheng
Tangye	唐冶	SkyShuttle Line 1 (OSI)			Licheng
Licheng No.2 High School Tangye Campus	历城二中唐冶校区	SkyShuttle Line 1 (OSI)			Licheng
Pengjiazhuang	彭家庄	2 SkyShuttle Line 1 (OSI)		40.30	Licheng
