= Site of the CPC Shandong Provincial Committee Secretariat =

The Site of the CPC Shandong Provincial Committee Secretariat (Chinese: 中共山东省委秘书处旧址; pinyin: Zhōnggòng Shāndōng Shěng Wěimìshūchù Jiùzhǐ) is located in the Tianqiao District of Jinan, Shandong Province, China. It has been placed on the list of Major historical and cultural sites protected by Shandong Province as a "revolutionary site" on December 23, 1977 (site number 1-04).

== Location ==
The street address of the site is East Liushui Alley 105 (东流水街105号). It is located off Dikou Road, about 300 meters to the west of the intersection between Dikou Road and Jiluo Road.

== See also ==
- List of sites in Jinan
- Major historical and cultural sites protected by Shandong Province
