= Weihui South railway station =

Railway station in Xinxiang, Henan

Weihui South 卫辉南

General information
- Location: Weihui, Xinxiang, Henan; China
- Coordinates: 35°23′24.94″N 114°7′58.43″E
- Line: Zhengzhou–Jinan high-speed railway
Location

Weihui South railway station (Chinese: 卫辉南站) is a railway station in Weihui, Xinxiang, Henan, China. It is an intermediate stop on the currently under construction Zhengzhou–Jinan high-speed railway.

== See also ==
- Weihui railway station

Preceding station	China Railway High-speed	Following station
Xinxiang East towards Zhengzhou East	Zhengzhou–Jinan high-speed railway	Huaxun towards Jinan West
