= Zhengzhou–Jinan high-speed railway =

High speed rail line in China

Zhengzhou–Jinan high-speed railway 郑济高速铁路

Overview
- Status: Operational
- Locale: Zhengzhou; Jinan
- Termini: Zhengzhou East; Jinan West

Service
- Operator(s): China Railway High-speed

Technical
- Line length: 378.7 km (235 mi)
- Track gauge: 1,435 mm (4 ft 8 1/2 in)
- Operating speed: 350 km/h (217 mph)

The Zhengzhou–Jinan high-speed railway is a high-speed railway in China.

== History ==
On 31 August 2016, a feasibility study was published which investigated the construction of a railway between Zhengzhou and Jinan. At the time, it was expected to be completed by 2020.

Construction officially began on 18 June 2020 on the section between Zhengzhou East and Puyang East and operation began on 20 June 2022. The Jinan-Puyang section started construction on 29 December 2019 and opened on 8 December 2023.

== Stations ==
Station Name	Chinese	Metro transfers/connections
Zhengzhou East		1 5 8 (u/c)
Xinxiang South
Xinxiang East
Weihui South
Huaxun
Neihuang
Puyang East
Nanle
Shenxian
Liaocheng West
Chiping South
Changqing
Jinan West		1 4 (u/c) 6 (u/c)
