= Huaxun railway station =

Railway station in Henan, China

Huaxun 滑浚
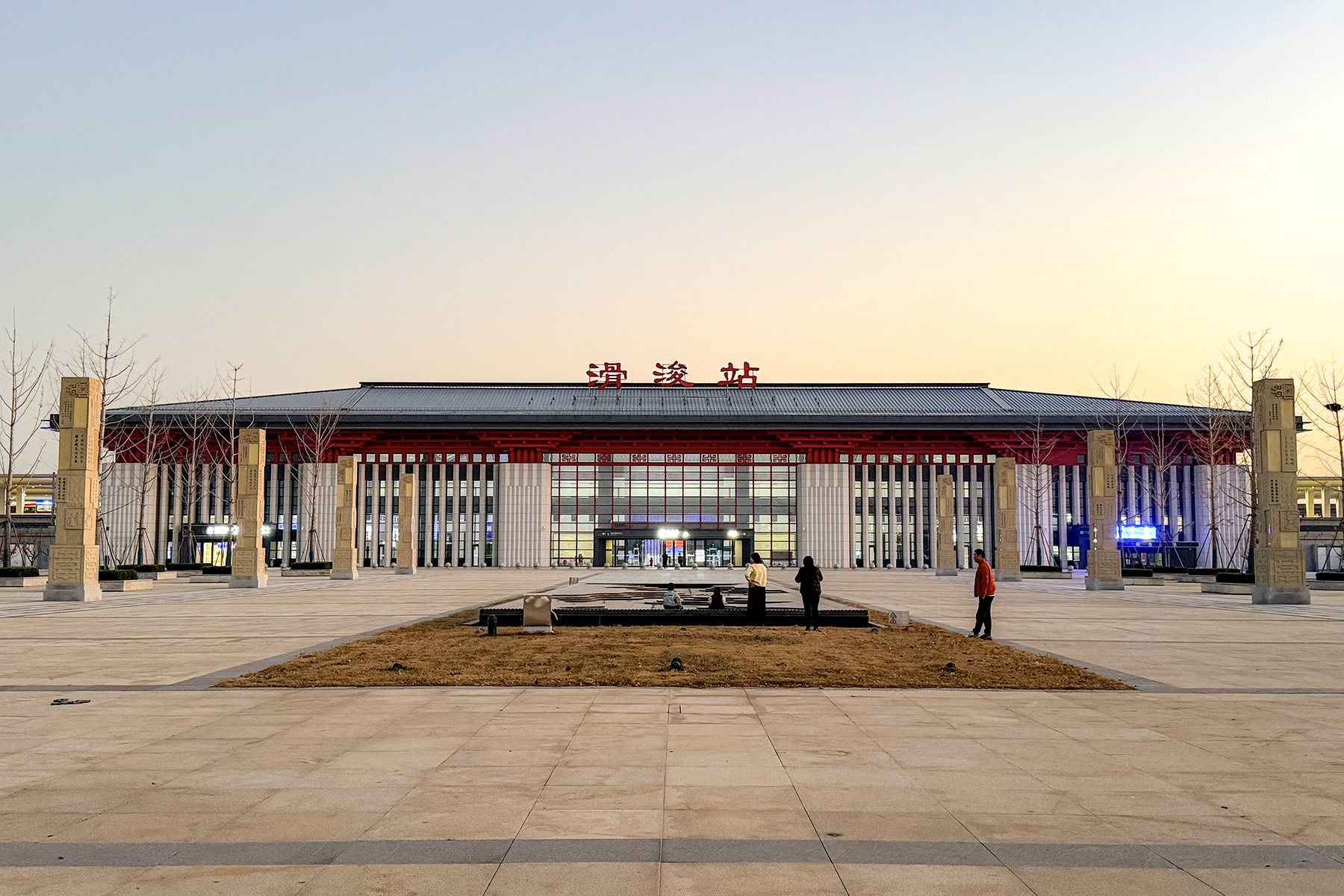
- Station seen from Xun County side

General information
- Location: Hua County, Anyang / Xun County, Hebi, Henan; China
- Coordinates: 35.61685°N 114.545922°E
- Line: Zhengzhou–Jinan high-speed railway

History
- Opened: 20 June 2022
Location

Huaxun railway station is a station on the Zhengzhou–Jinan high-speed railway. The station serves both Hua County and Xun County, hence the name of the station. It opened with the initial section of the railway, between Zhengzhou East and Puyang East, on 20 June 2022.

Originally there was some dispute between the counties about the location of a station on the line for each of them individually. Eventually it was settled that a single station was to be built on the boundary between the counties and named after both counties, with both sides having their own station entrance, thus saving construction cost for two separate stations. The Hua County side building in the south of the station has architecture inspired by the Xia, Shang and Zhou dynasties. The Xun County side is inspired by the Tang and Han dynasty.

Preceding station	China Railway High-speed	Following station
Weihui South towards Zhengzhou East	Zhengzhou–Jinan high-speed railway	Neihuang towards Jinan West
