= Line 8 (Jinan Metro) =

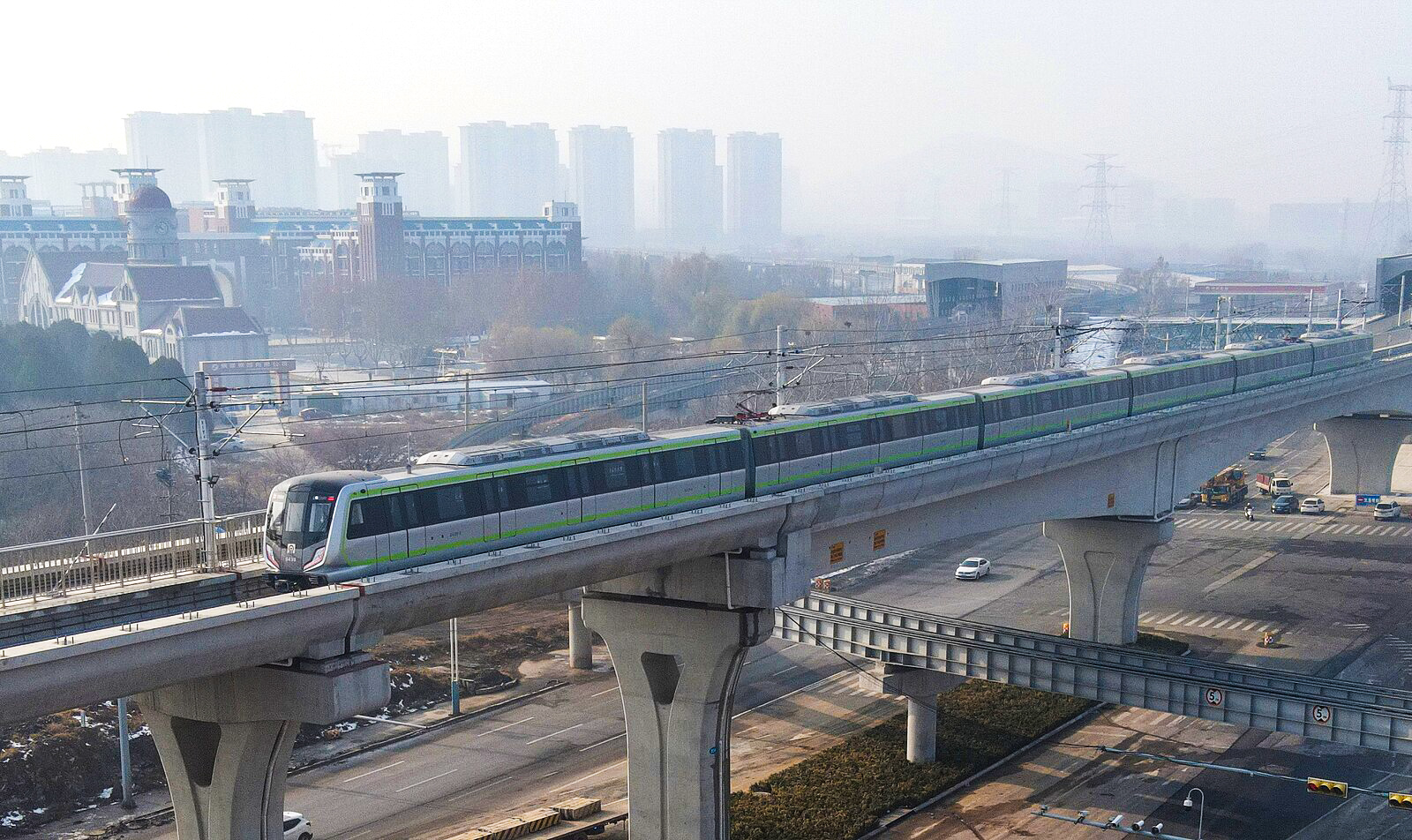

Overview
- Other name: R4 (construction name)
- Status: In operation
- Locale: Jinan
- Termini: Xingcun Lijiaoqiao East; Qingyuan Dajie
- Stations: 14

Service
- Type: Rapid transit
- System: Jinan Metro

Technical
- Line length: 25.5 km
- Character: Underground and Elevated
- Track gauge: 1,435 mm (4 ft 8 1/2 in)

Line 8 of Jinan Metro (Chinese: 济南地铁8号线; pinyin: Jǐnán Dìtiě Bā Hào Xiàn) is a rapid transit line in Jinan. The line is 25.5 km in length, including 19.9 km elevated section and a 5.6 km underground section. The line comprises 14 stations. Construction started on September 20, 2022. The line opened on December 27, 2025.

== Stations ==
Station Name		Connections	Distance km	District
English	Chinese	Connections	Distance km	District
↑Before 8 pm, through service via Line 4 for Shandong First Medical University
Xingcun Lijiaoqiao East	邢村立交桥东	4		Licheng
Shandong Youth University of Political Science	青年政治学院			Licheng
Supercomputing Center	超算中心			Licheng
Shandong Highway Technician College	公路技师学院			Licheng
Chunbo Lu	春博路	SkyShuttle Line 1 (OSI)		Licheng
Shandong Polytechnic	山东职业学院	SkyShuttle Line 1 (OSI)		Licheng
Shandong Xiandai University	山东现代学院			Licheng
Shandong University of Finance and Economics Zhangqiu Campus	山财章丘校区			Zhangqiu
Huangtuya	黄土崖			Zhangqiu
Huangqishan North	黄旗山北			Zhangqiu
Shengjing	圣井			Zhangqiu
Shandong University Longshan	山大龙山			Zhangqiu
Xiuyuan He	绣源河			Zhangqiu
Qingyuan Dajie	清源大街			Zhangqiu
