= Greenland Puli Center =

Supertall skyscraper in Jinan, Shandong, China

- 济南绿地·普利中心
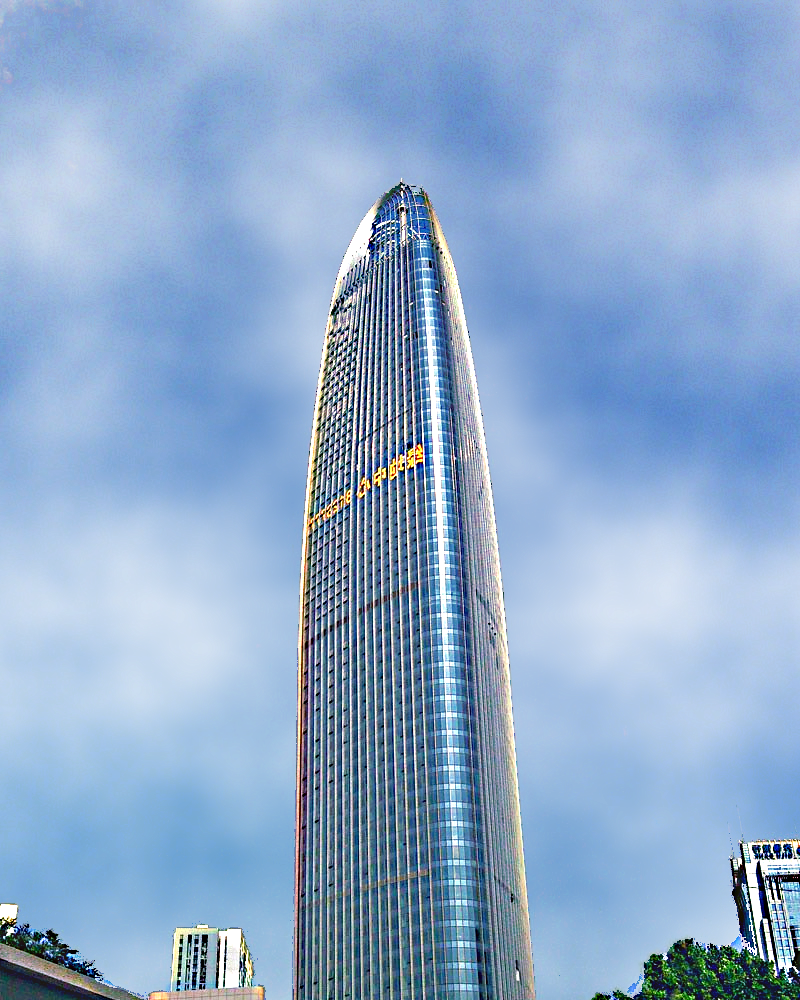
- Interactive map of the Greenland Puli Center area

General information
- Status: Completed
- Location: No.28 Gongqingtuan Road, Shizhong District, Jinan, Shandong, China
- Coordinates: 36°39′46″N 117°0′6″E
- Construction started: 2010
- Completed: 2015

Height
- Architectural: 301 m (988 ft)
- Tip: 301 m (988 ft)
- Top floor: 244 m (801 ft)

Technical details
- Floor count: 61
- Floor area: 111,064 m^{2} (1,195,480 sq ft)

Design and construction
- Architect: Skidmore, Owings & Merrill LLP
- Main contractor: Shanghai Construction Group

Greenland Puli Center
- Simplified Chinese: 济南绿地·普利中心
- Traditional Chinese: 濟南綠地·普利中心
Transcriptions
Standard Mandarin
- Hanyu Pinyin: Jǐnán Lǜdì·Pǔlì Zhōngxīn

Greenland Puli Center is a skyscraper in Jinan, Shandong, China. It has a height of 303 metres (994 ft). Construction began in 2010 and ended in 2015. It was the tallest building in Jinan until the completion of the 333-metre (1,093 ft) Jinan Center Financial City A5-3 in 2020.

== See also ==
- List of tallest buildings in China
