= Jinan SkyShuttle =

Rubber-tyred metro line in Jinan, China

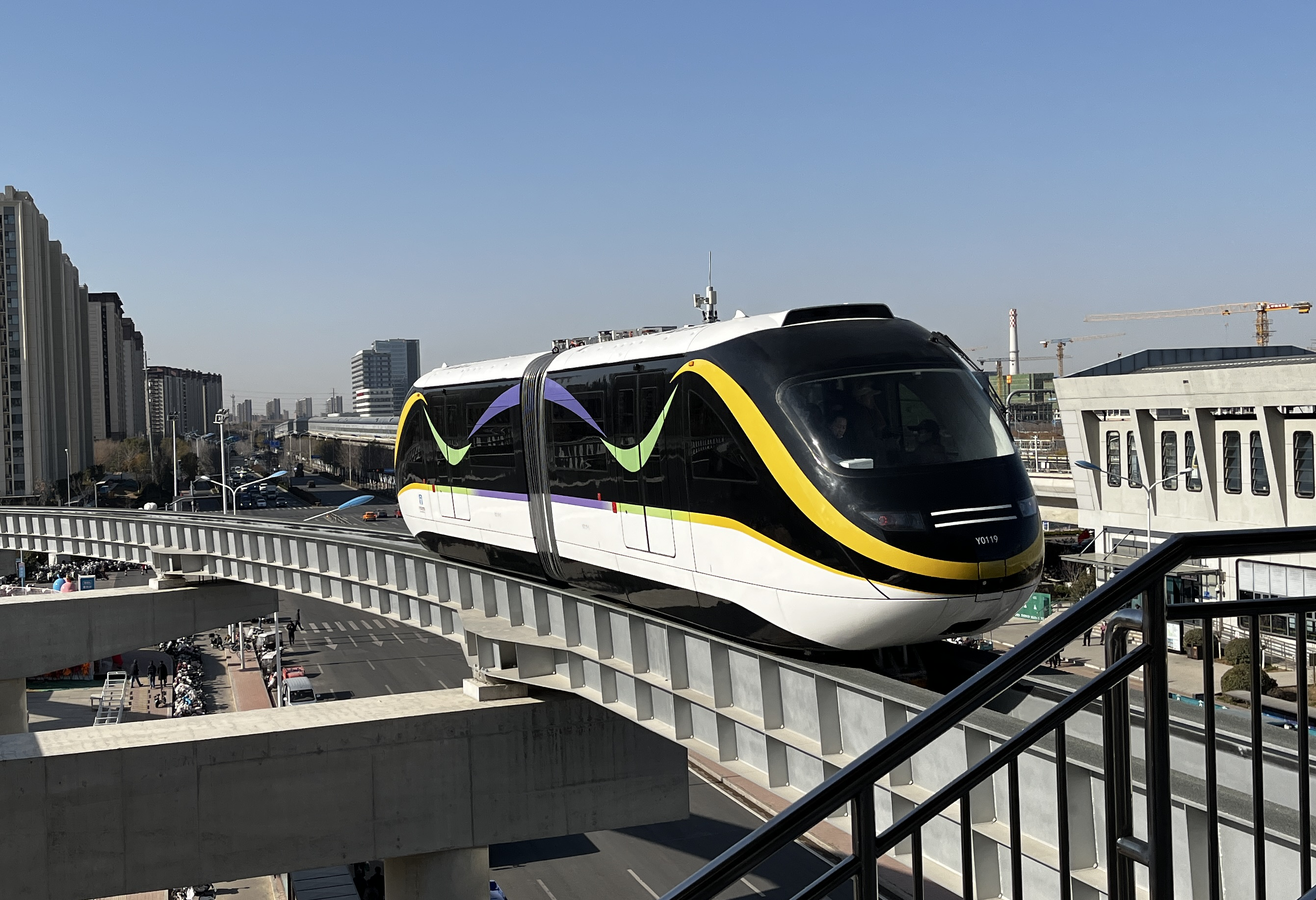
- Jinan SkyShuttle train in December 2025

Overview
- Stations: 32

Service
- Type: Rapid transit
- System: Jinan Metro

History
- Opened: 6 December 2025; 23 days ago

Technical
- Line length: 30.55 km (18.98 mi)
- Operating speed: 80 km/h (50 mph)

The Jinan SkyShuttle (Chinese: 济南云巴), officially Jinan SkyShuttle Line 1 (Chinese: 济南云巴1号线), is an elevated rubber-tyred metro line in Jinan, China. The 30.55-kilometre (18.98 mi) long line has 32 stations. The line runs in a loop connecting to Line 2 of the Jinan Metro at terminus Pengjiazhuang, with an additional two interchange stations with each of Line 4 and Line 8.

== History ==
Construction began in 2023. Trial operations began on 7 August 2025, and the full line opened to the public on 6 December 2025.

== Map ==
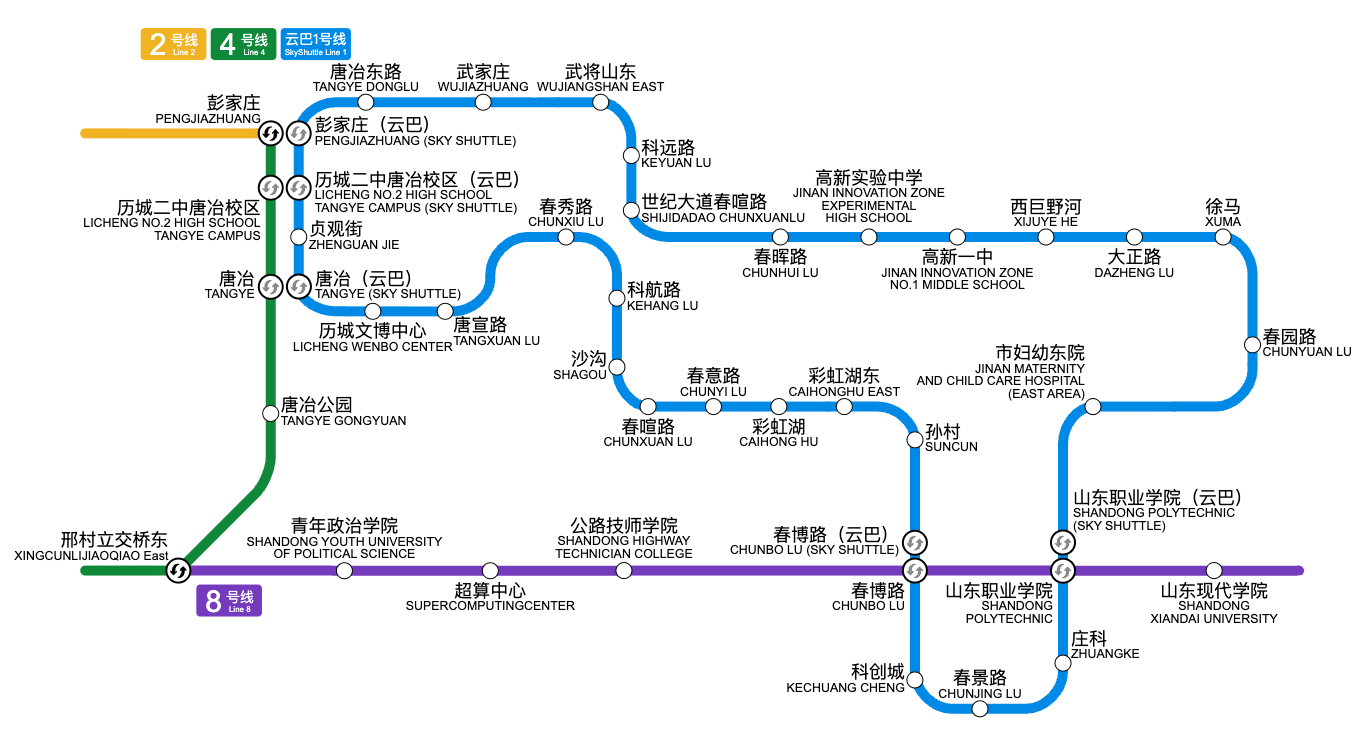

== Technology ==
The line uses BYD's SkyShuttle system (Chinese: 云巴; pinyin: Yún Bā; lit. 'Cloud Bus'). This line is the first SkyShuttle installation in Shandong province.

Trains are driverless and are operated in a two-car formation, with each train having a capacity of 140 passengers and capable of speeds up to 80 km/h.
