= Huaiyin, Jinan =

Huaiyin 槐荫区
- District
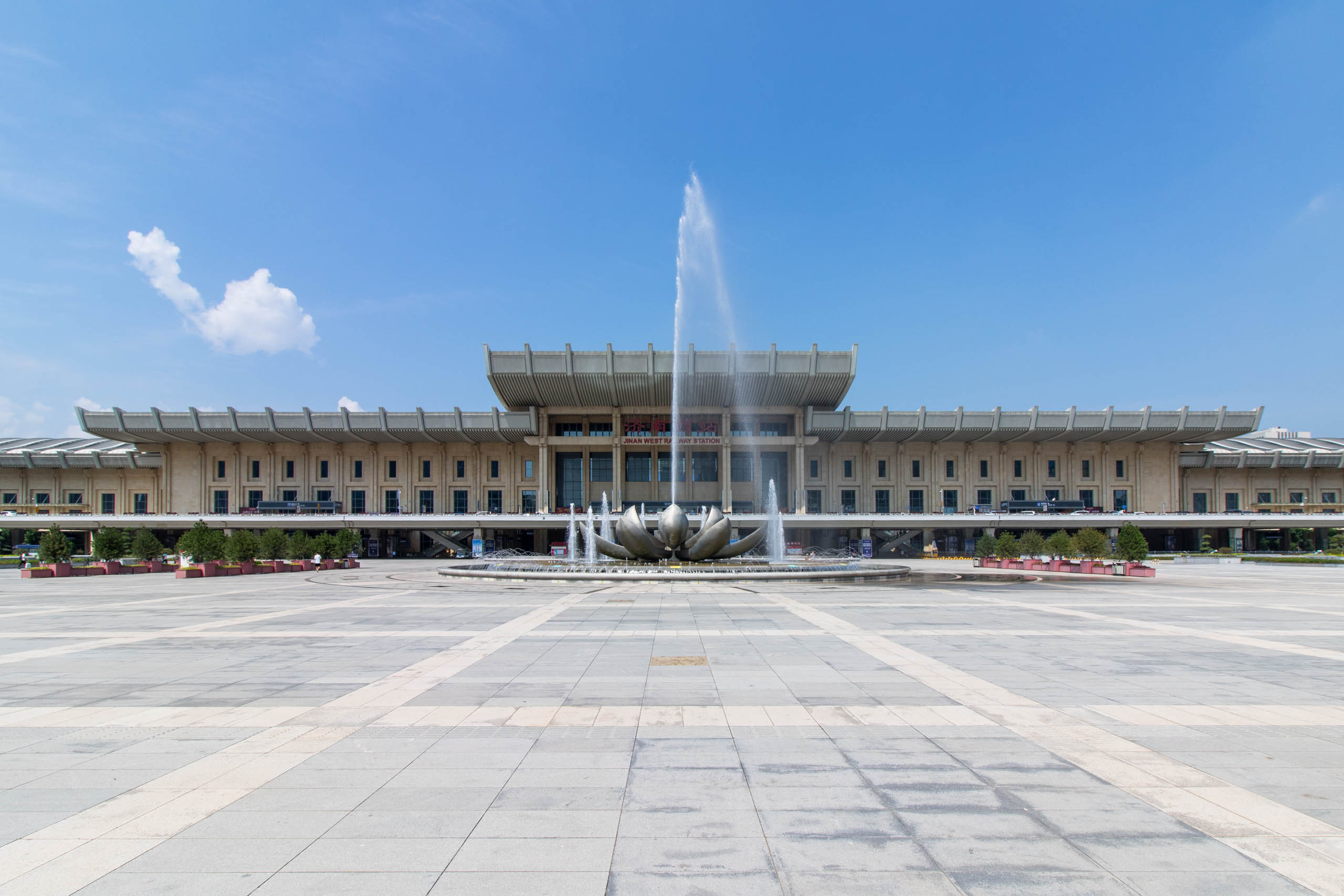
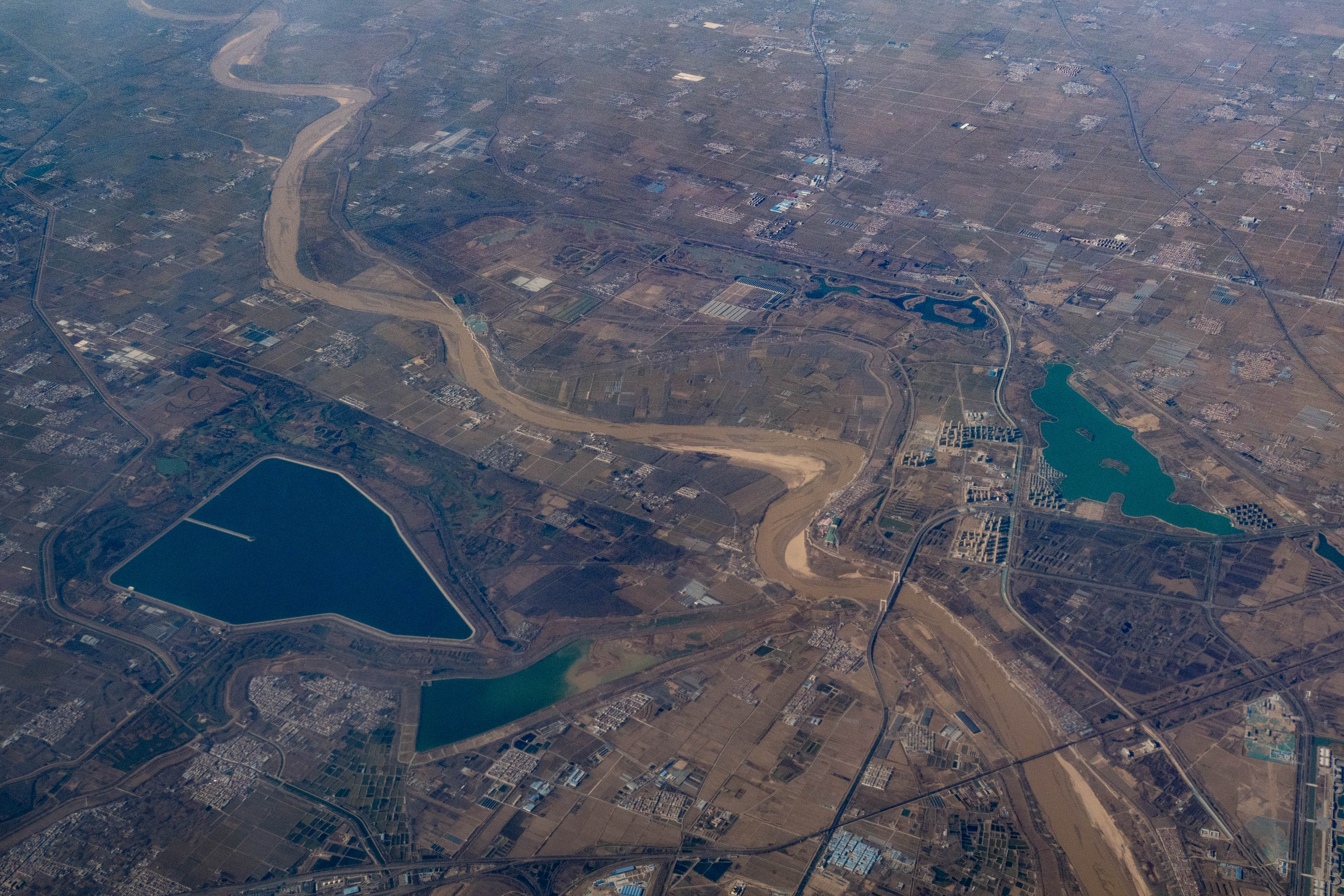
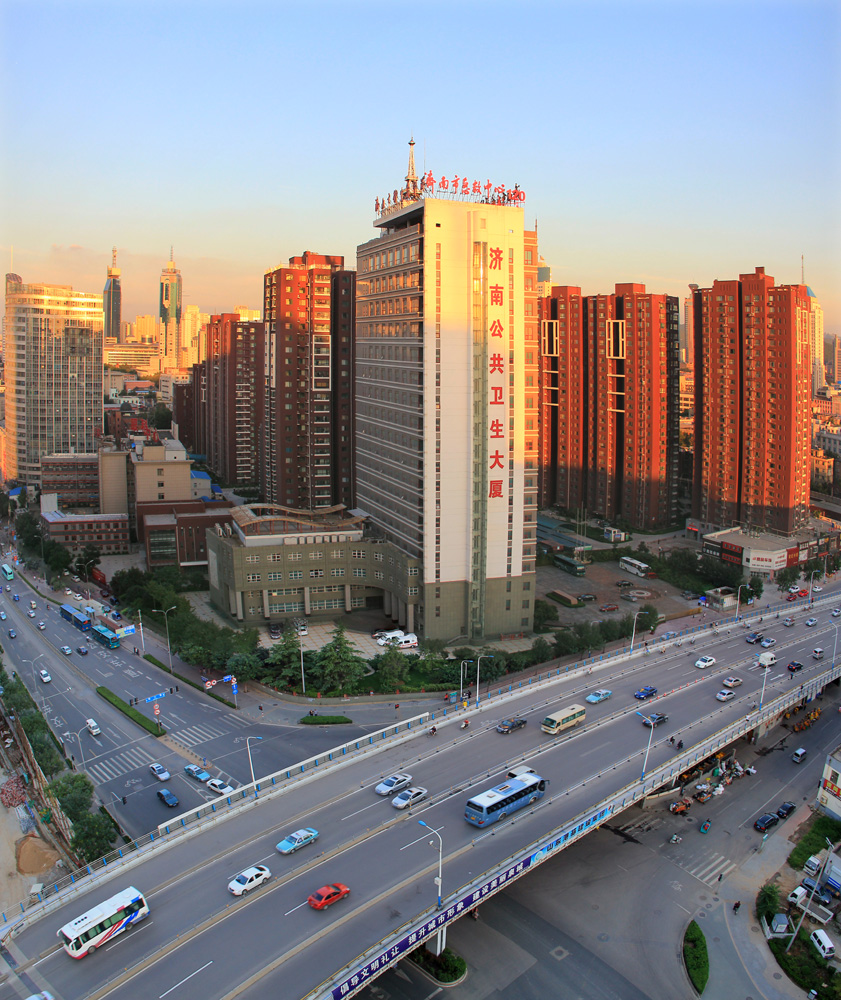
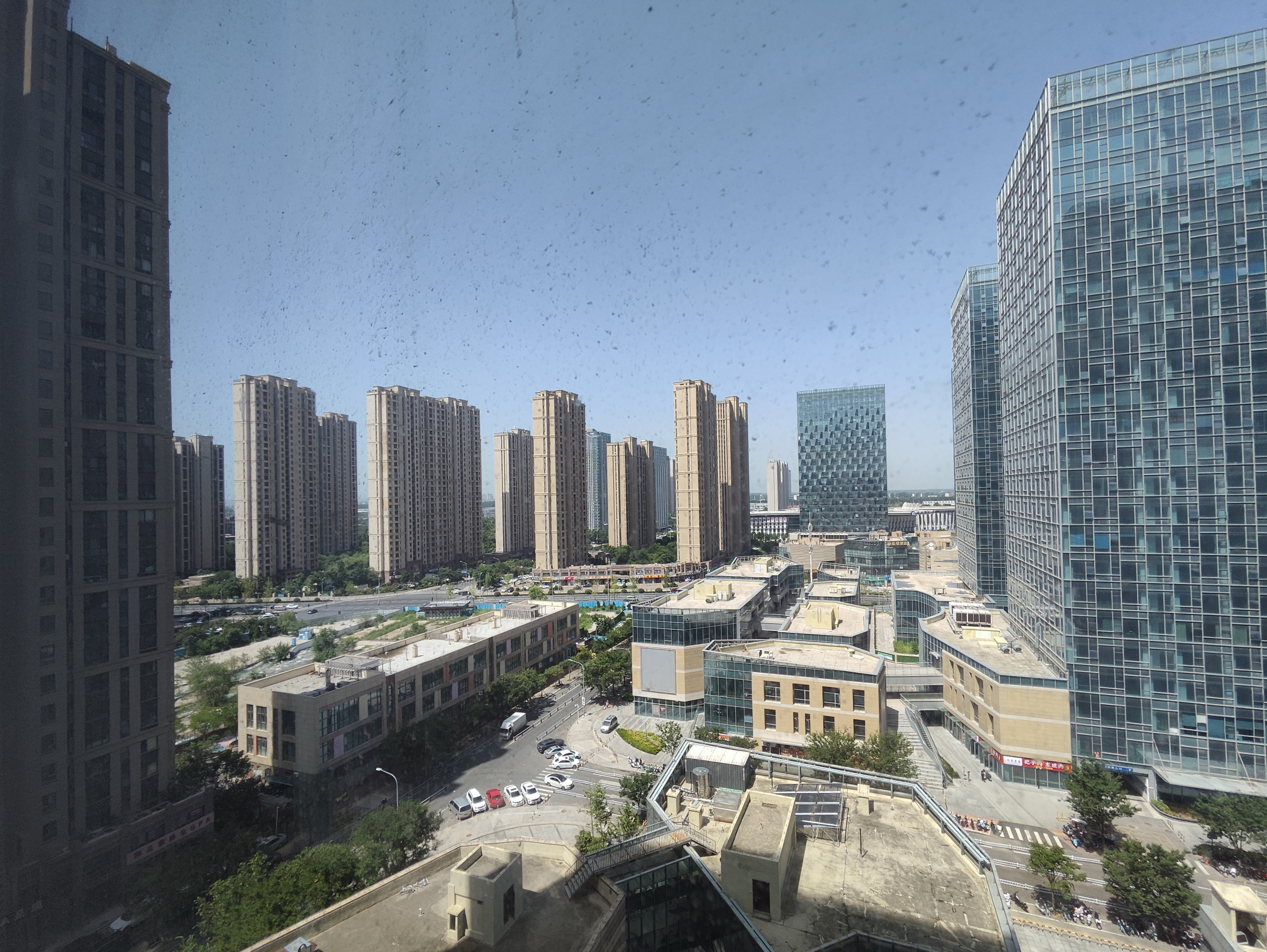
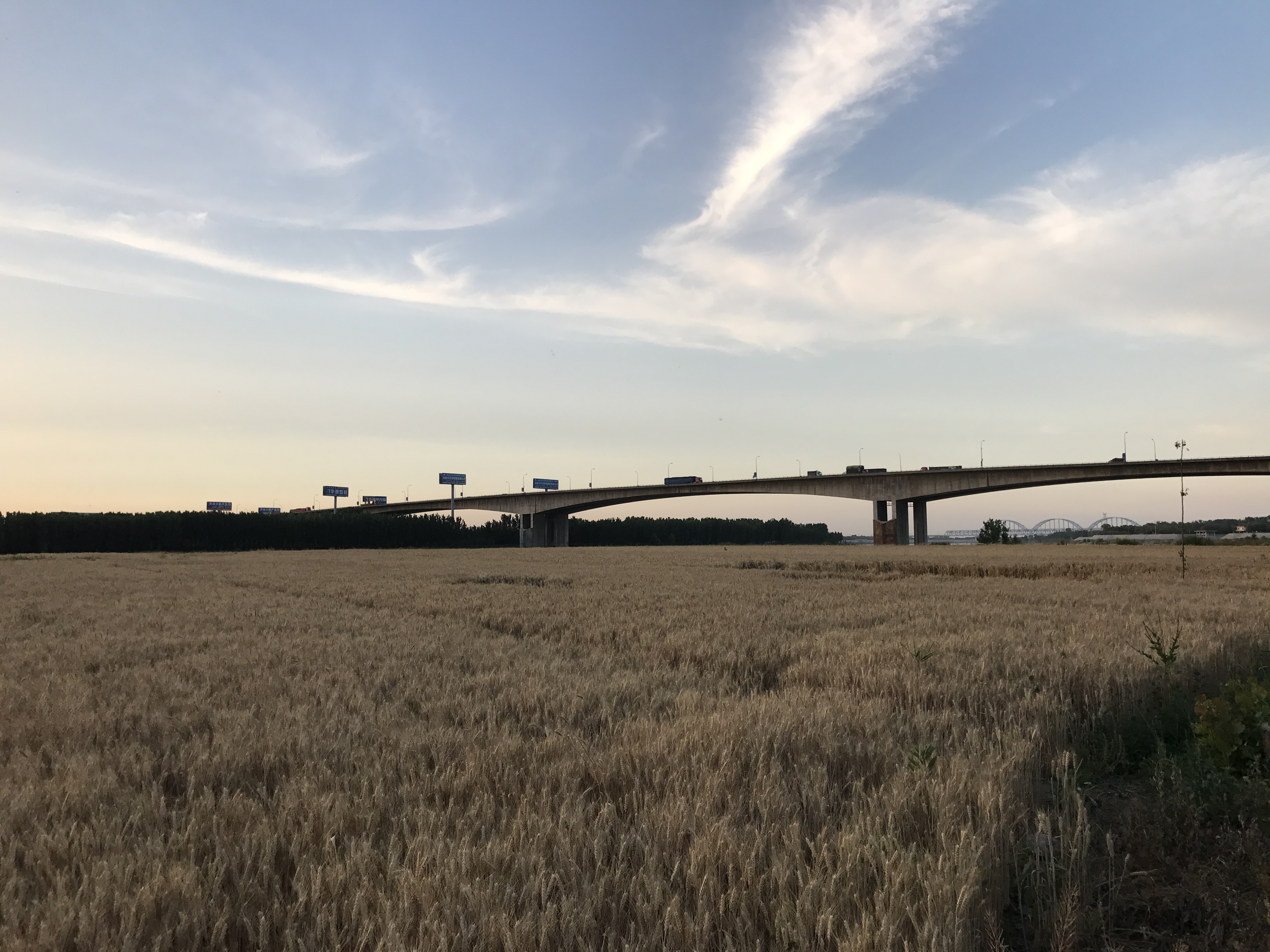
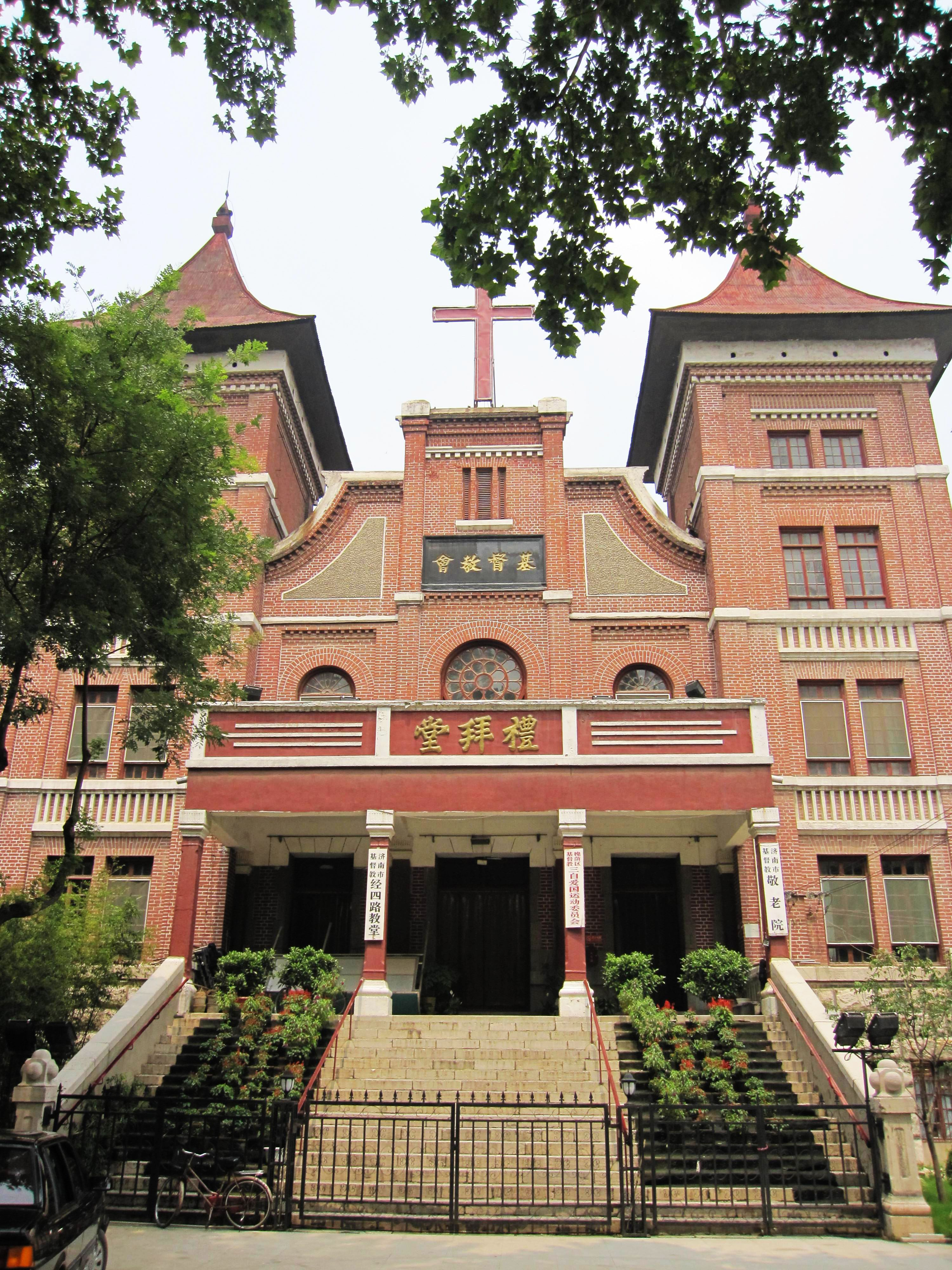
- Jinanxi Railway Station Yellow River Aerial View Residential Area CBD before Jinanxi Railway Station G3 Expressway Bridge Christian Church on Jingsi Road

- Location in Shandong
- Coordinates: 36°39′05″N 116°54′04″E
- Country: People's Republic of China
- Province: Shandong
- Sub-provincial city: Jinan

Area
  - Total: 151.65 km^{2} (58.55 sq mi)

Population (2020)
  - Total: 532,000
  - Density: 3,510/km^{2} (9,090/sq mi)
- Time zone: UTC+8 (China Standard)
- Postal code: 250000
- Website: huaiyin.gov.cn

Huaiyin District (simplified Chinese: 槐荫区; traditional Chinese: 槐蔭區; pinyin: Huáiyìn Qū) is one of 10 urban districts of the prefecture-level city of Jinan, the capital of Shandong Province, East China, forming part of the city's urban core. It borders the districts of Tianqiao to the northeast, Shizhong to the southeast, and Changqing to the southwest, as well as the prefecture-level city of Dezhou to the northwest.

== History ==
Before the Ming dynasty, the present Huaiyin District was a rural area outside of old citywall of Jinan. It consisted primarily of a cluster of villages centered around Panlongzhuang. During the reign of Wanli Emperor (1573), it was renamed Village of Da Huaishu ('Village of Great Pagoda Tree'). After the establishment of the international commercial area in Jinan in 1904 near the end of the Qing dynasty, the area gradually developed into an urban residential district. In 1955, it was officially designated as Huaiyin District; Huaiyin literally means 'shade of pagoda tree'.

== Administrative divisions ==
As of 2012, this district is divided to 12 subdistricts and 2 towns.

Subdistricts

- Zhenxingjie Subdistrict (振兴街街道)
- Zhongdahuaishu Subdistrict (中大槐树街道)
- Daodejie Subdistrict (道德街街道)
- Xishichang Subdistrict (西市场街道)
- Wuligou Subdistrict (五里沟街道)
- Yingshijie Subdistrict (营市街街道)
- Qingniangongyuan Subdistrict (青年公园街道)
- Nanxinzhuang Subdistrict (南辛庄街道)
- Duandianbeilu Subdistrict (段店北路街道)
- Zhangzhuanglu Subdistrict (张庄路街道)
- Kuangshan Subdistrict (匡山街道)
- Meilihu Subdistrict (美里湖街道)

Towns

- Wujiabao (吴家堡镇)
- Duandian (段店镇)
