= Tianqiao, Jinan =

Tianqiao 天桥区
- District
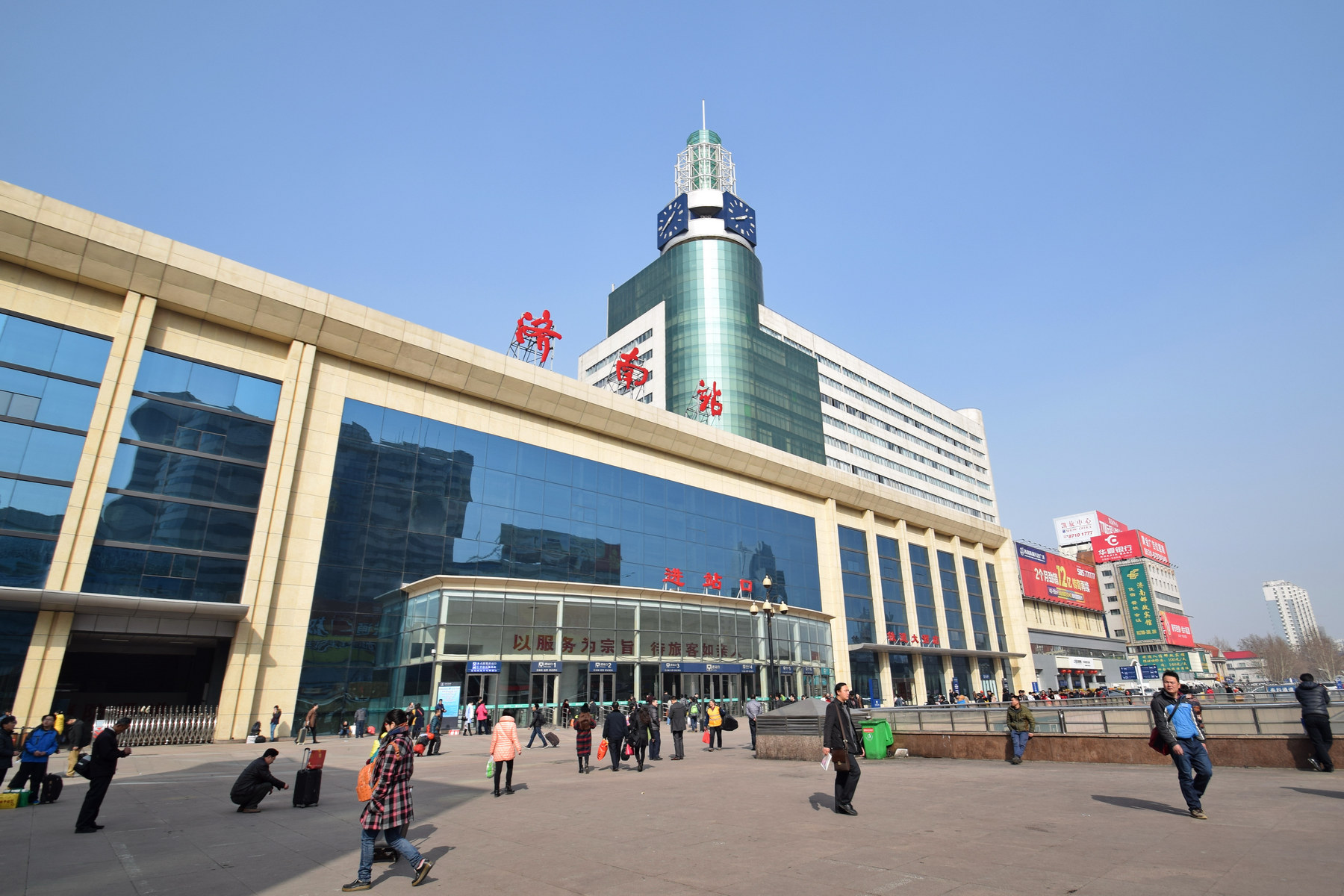
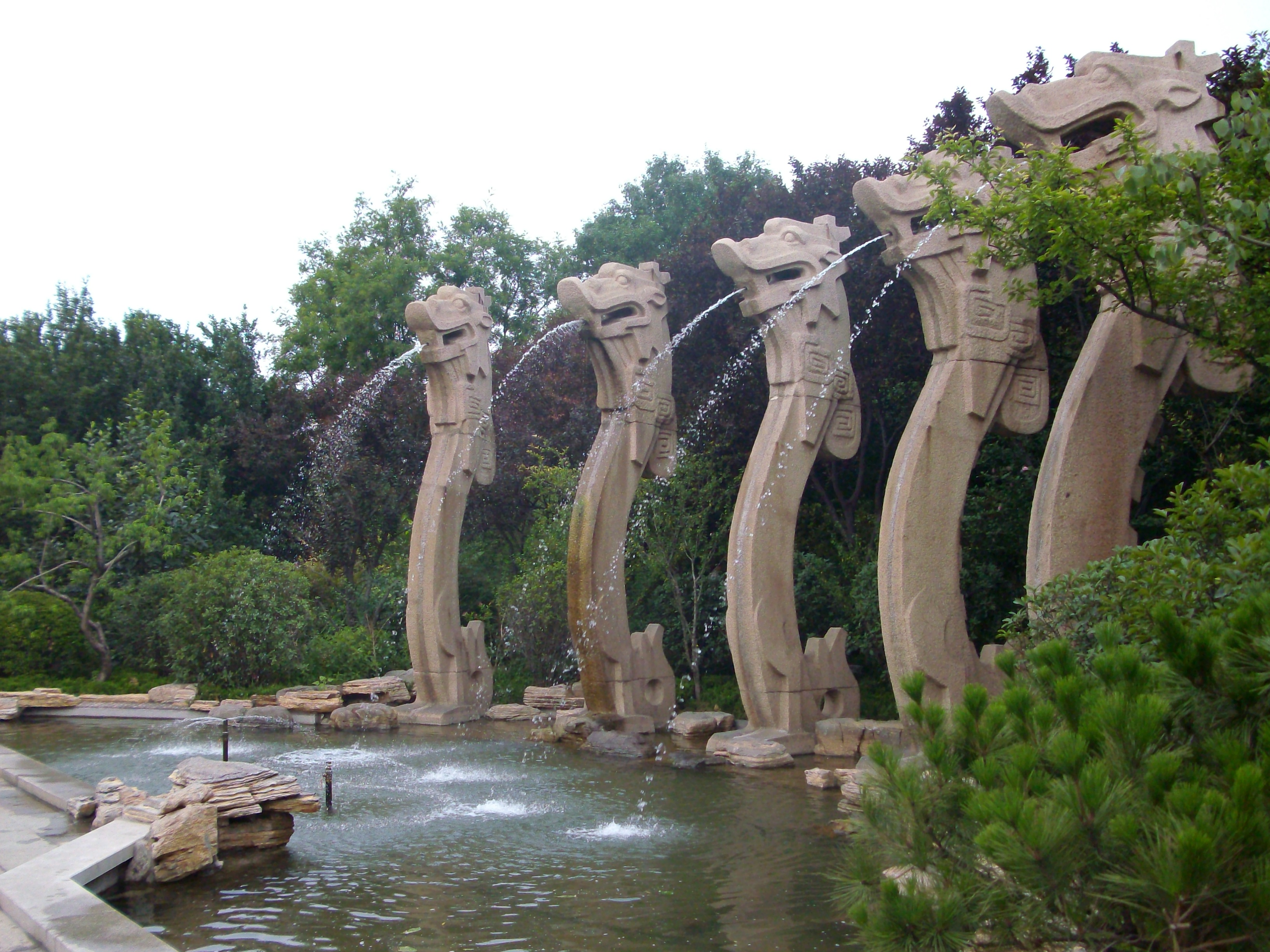
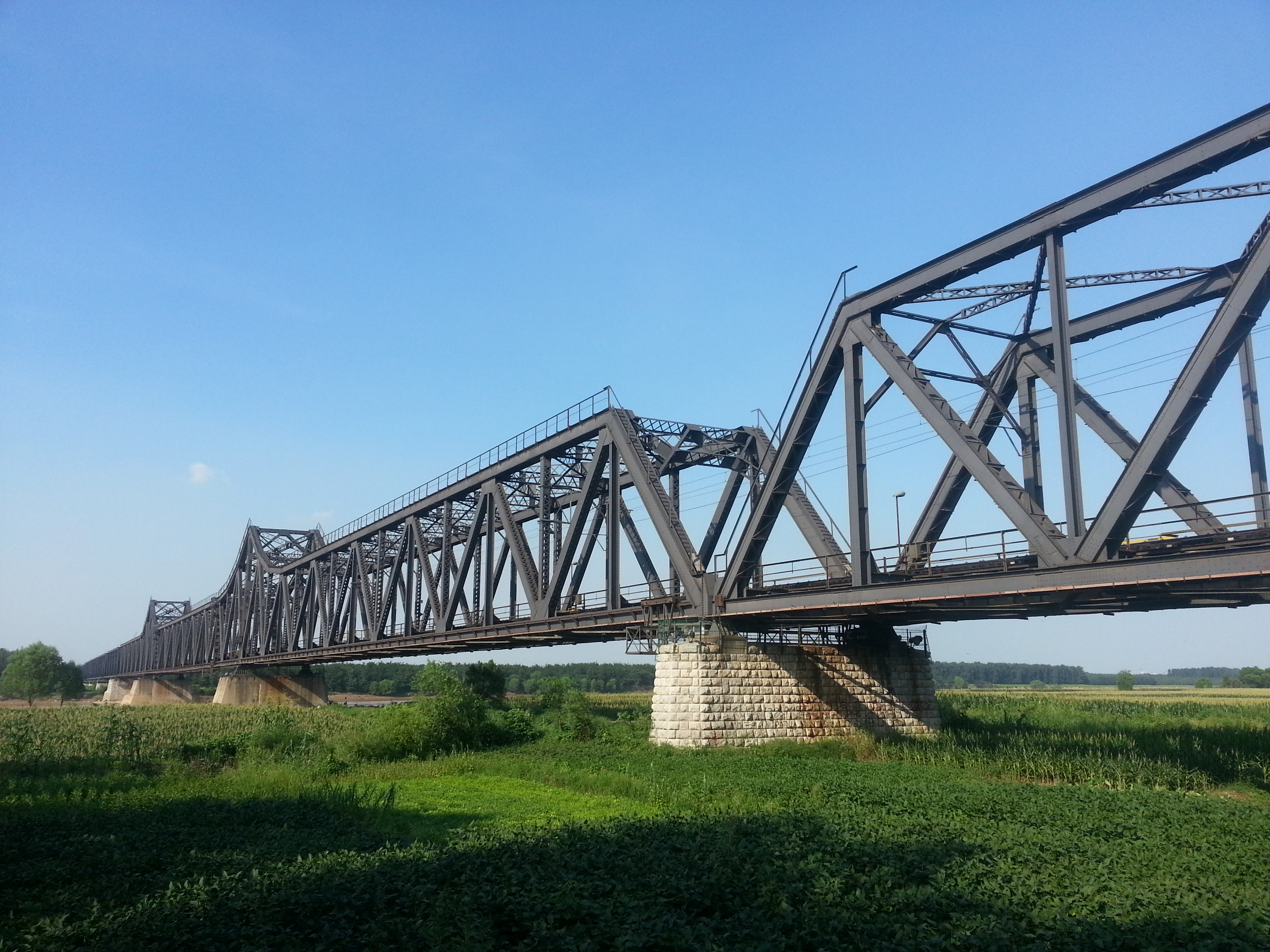
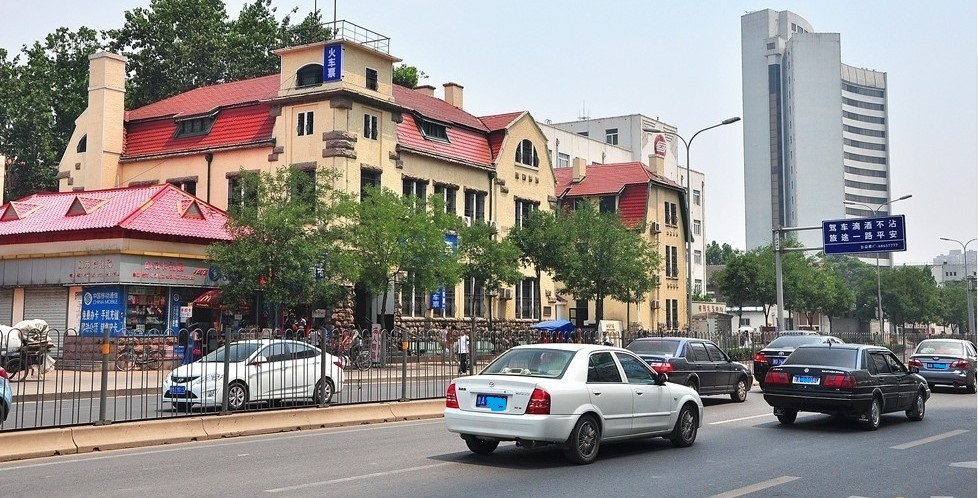
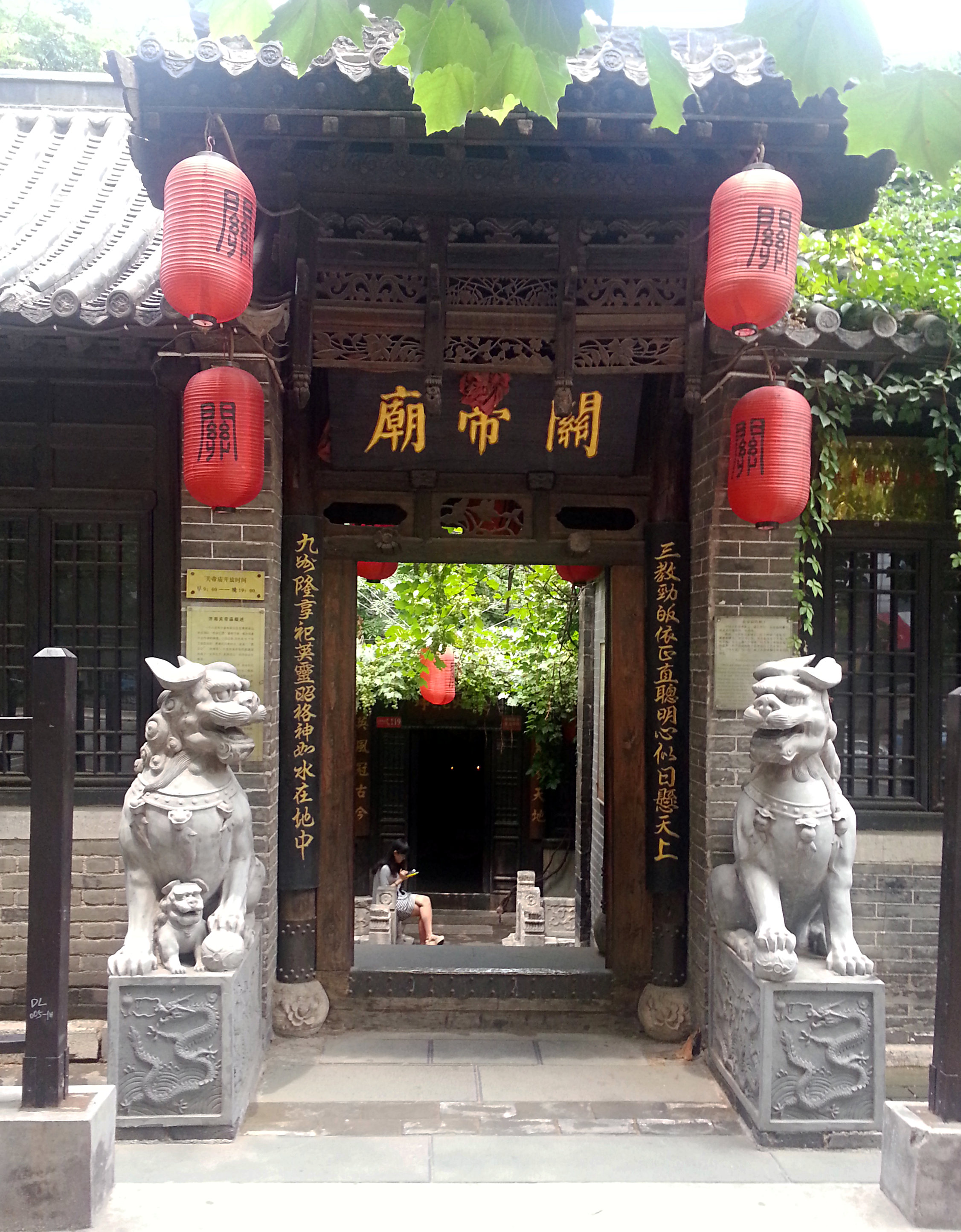
- Jinan Railway Station Five Dragon Pool Luokou Yellow River Bridge Tianqiao concession area Guandi Temple

- Location in Shandong
- Coordinates: 36°41′32″N 116°58′29″E
- Country: People's Republic of China
- Province: Shandong
- Sub-provincial city: Jinan

Area
  - Total: 258.71 km^{2} (99.89 sq mi)

Population (2018)
  - Total: 739,000
  - Density: 2,860/km^{2} (7,400/sq mi)
- Time zone: UTC+8 (China Standard)
- Postal code: 250031

Tianqiao District (simplified Chinese: 天桥区; traditional Chinese: 天橋區; pinyin: Tiānqiáo Qū; lit. 'sky bridge') is one of 10 urban districts of the prefecture-level city of Jinan, the capital of Shandong Province in East China, forming part of the city's urban core. It has an area of 258.71 km^{2} (99.89 sq mi) and has 688,415 permanent residents as of 2010. It borders Jiyang County to the north, Licheng District to the east, Lixia District to the southeast, Shizhong District to the south, Huaiyin District to the southwest, as well as the prefecture-level city of Dezhou to the northwest.

== Administrative divisions ==
As of 2012, this district is divided to 14 subdistricts and 1 town.

Subdistricts

- Wuyingshan Subdistrict (无影山街道)
- Tianqiaodongjie Subdistrict]] (天桥东街街道)
- Beicun Subdistrict (北村街道)
- Nancun Subdistrict (南村街道)
- Dikoulu Subdistrict (堤口路街道)
- Beitan Subdistrict (北坦街道)
- Zhijinshi Subdistrict (制锦市街道)
- Baohua Subdistrict (宝华街道)
- Guanzhaying Subdistrict (官扎营街道)
- Weibeilu Subdistrict (纬北路街道)
- Yaoshan Subdistrict (药山街道)
- Beiyuan Subdistrict (北园街道)
- Luokou Subdistrict (泺口街道)
- Daqiao Subdistrict (大桥街道)

Towns

- Sangzidian (桑梓店镇)

== Economy ==
Everbright International has its Jinan office in Tianqiao District. Historically, the district served as Jinan city's old industrial base, housing numerous enterprises in chemicals, paper, printing and dyeing, and automobile manufacturing. However, in recent years, Tianqiao district has strategically focused on industrial upgrading. As a result, the district has gradually established four key industries, namely new materials, intelligent manufacturing, high-end logistics, and modern commerce. Furthermore, it maintains a favorable debt burden, with well-managed debt growth within reasonable bounds. Overall, the credit status of the district remains stable.
