= Shizhong, Jinan =

Shizhong 市中区
- District
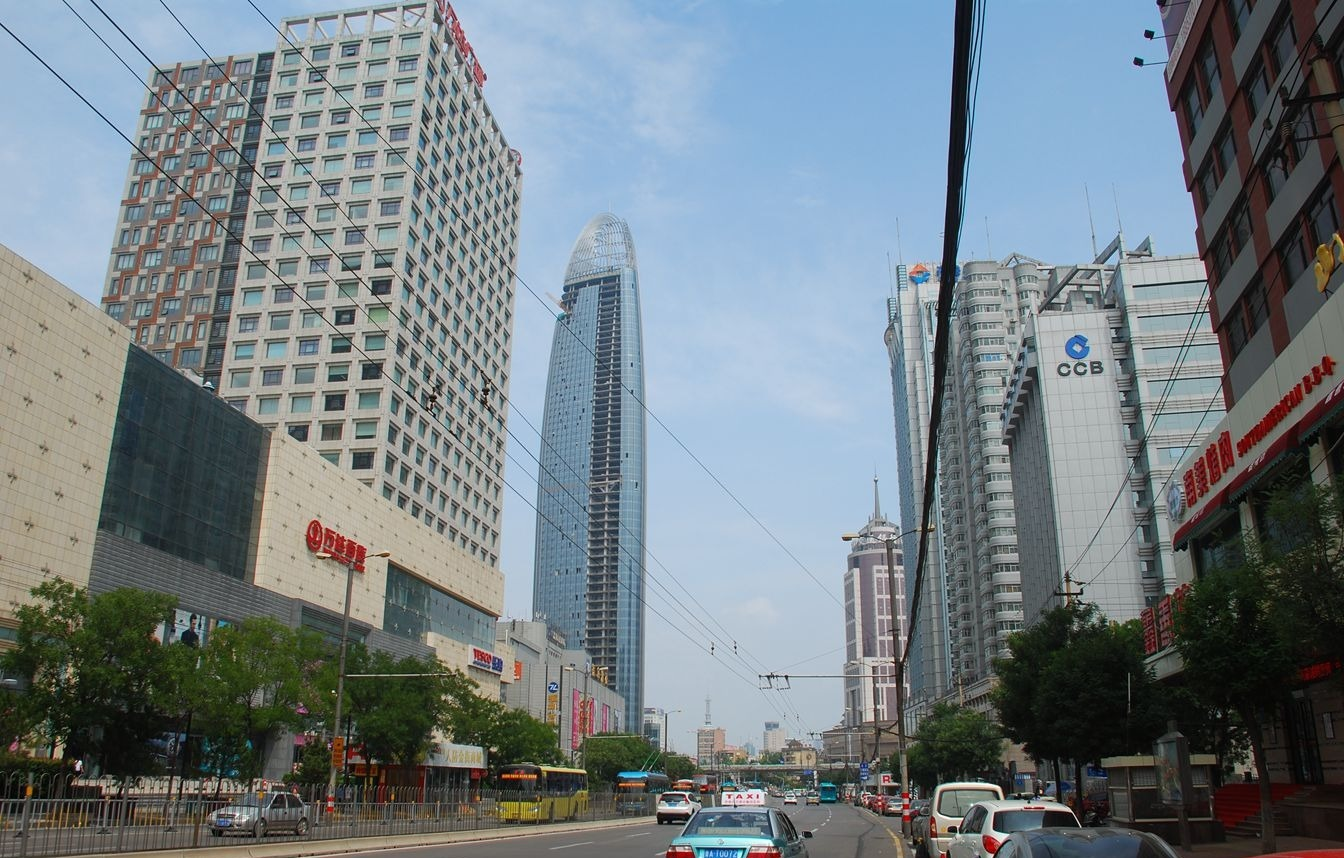
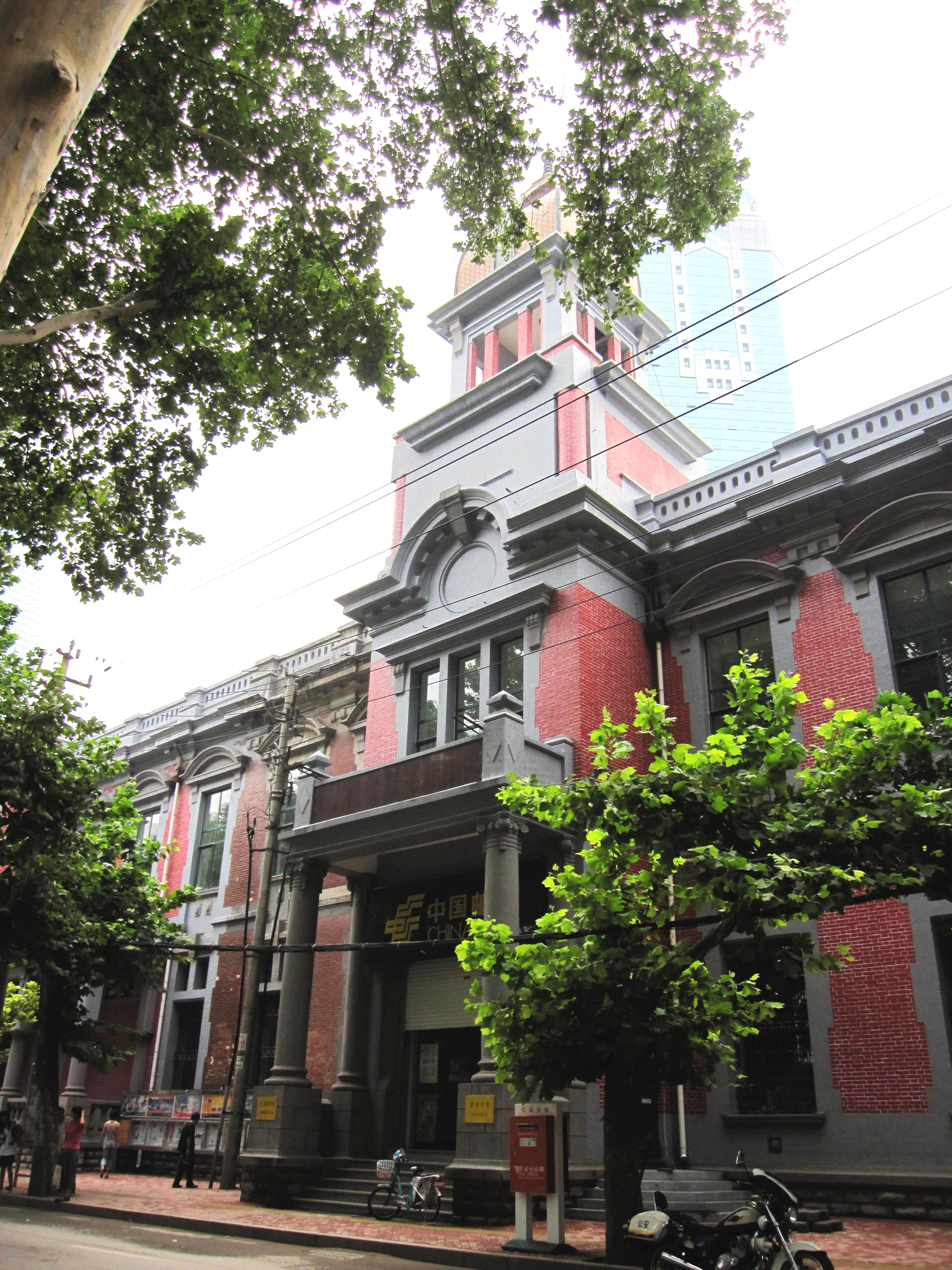
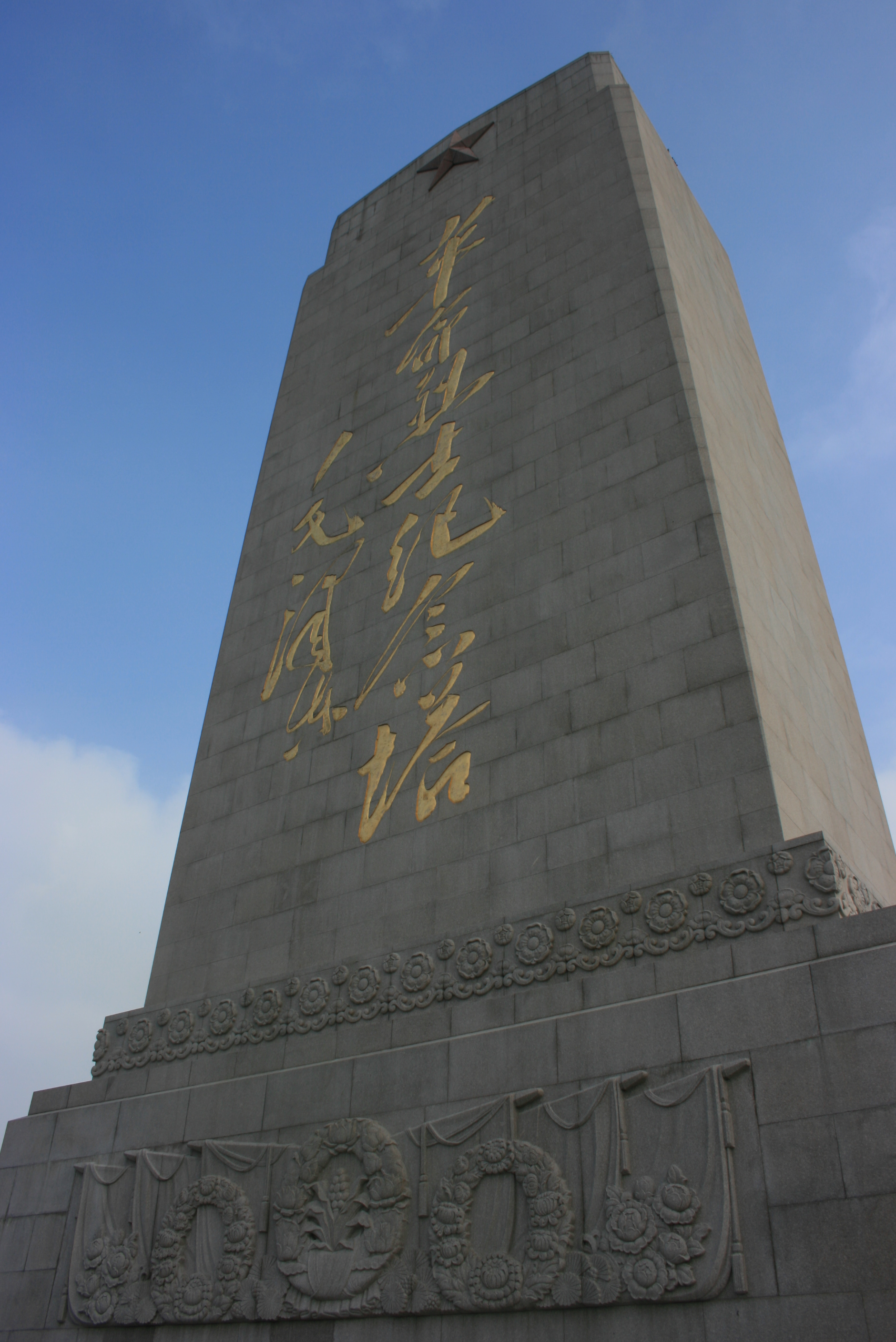
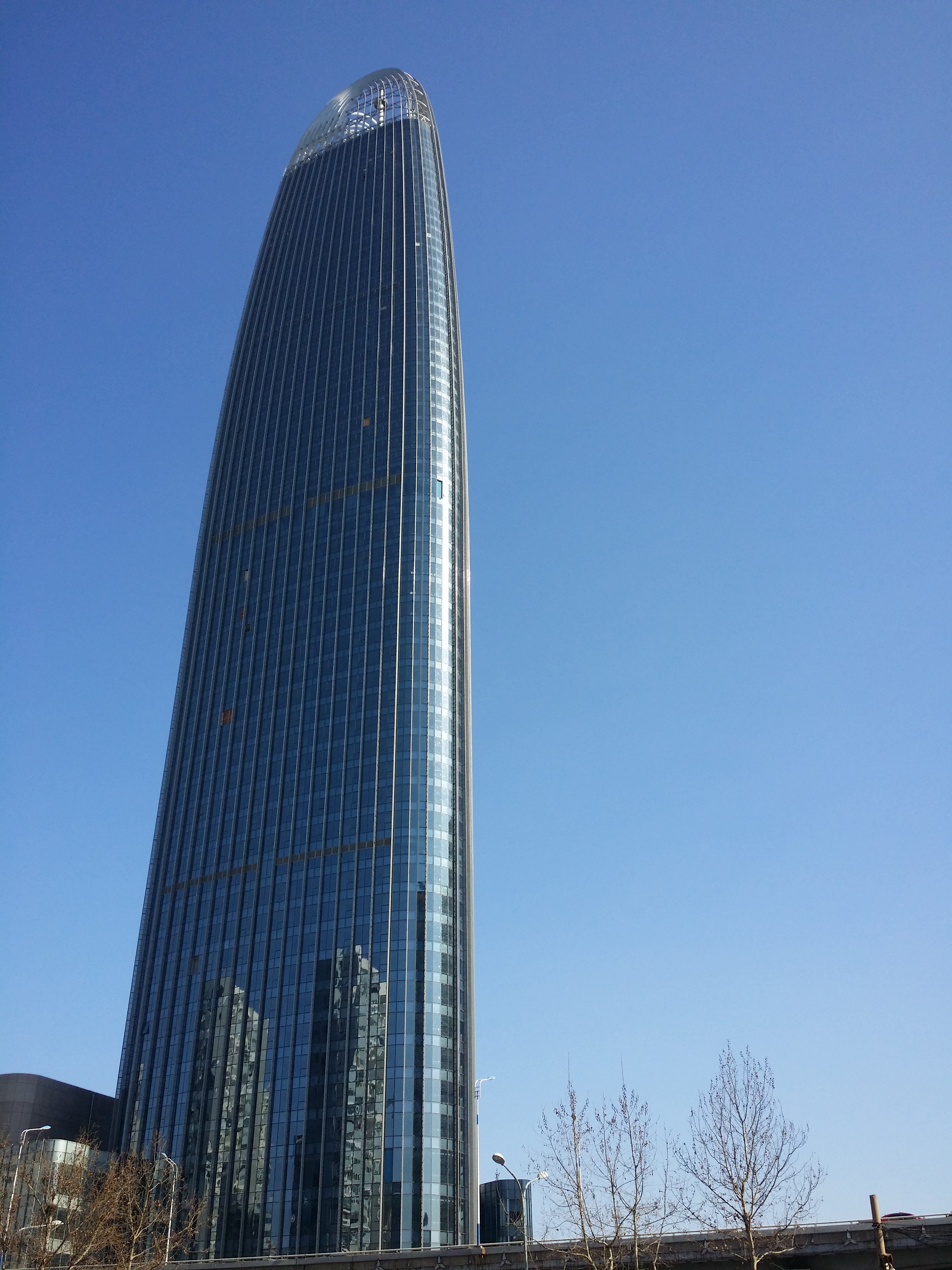
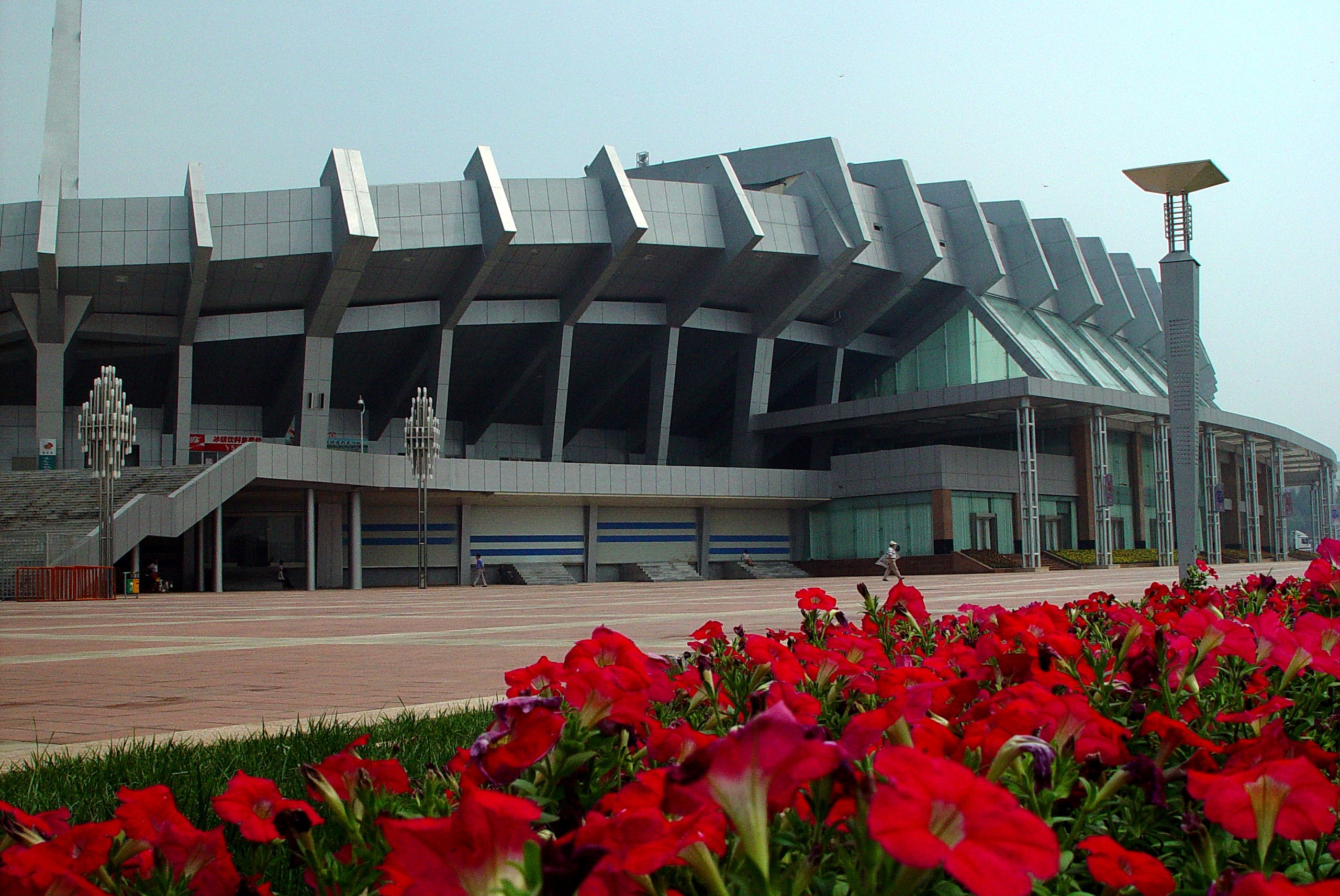
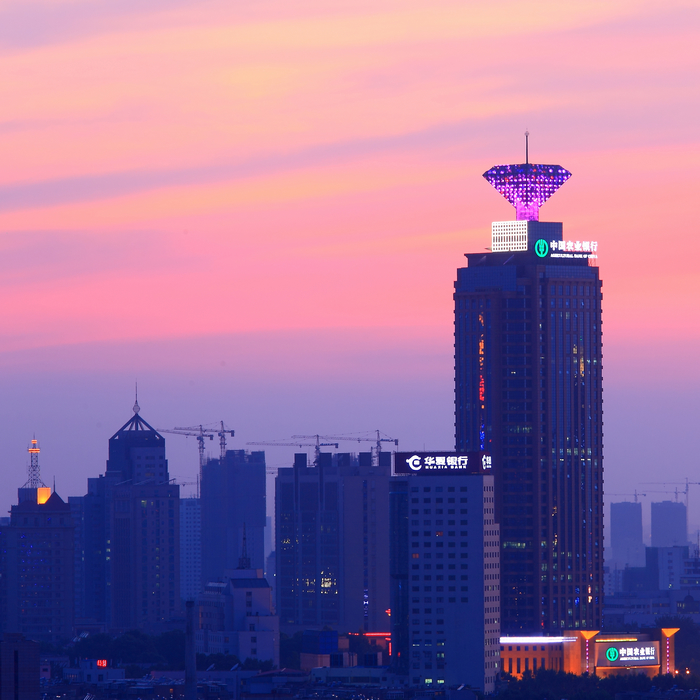
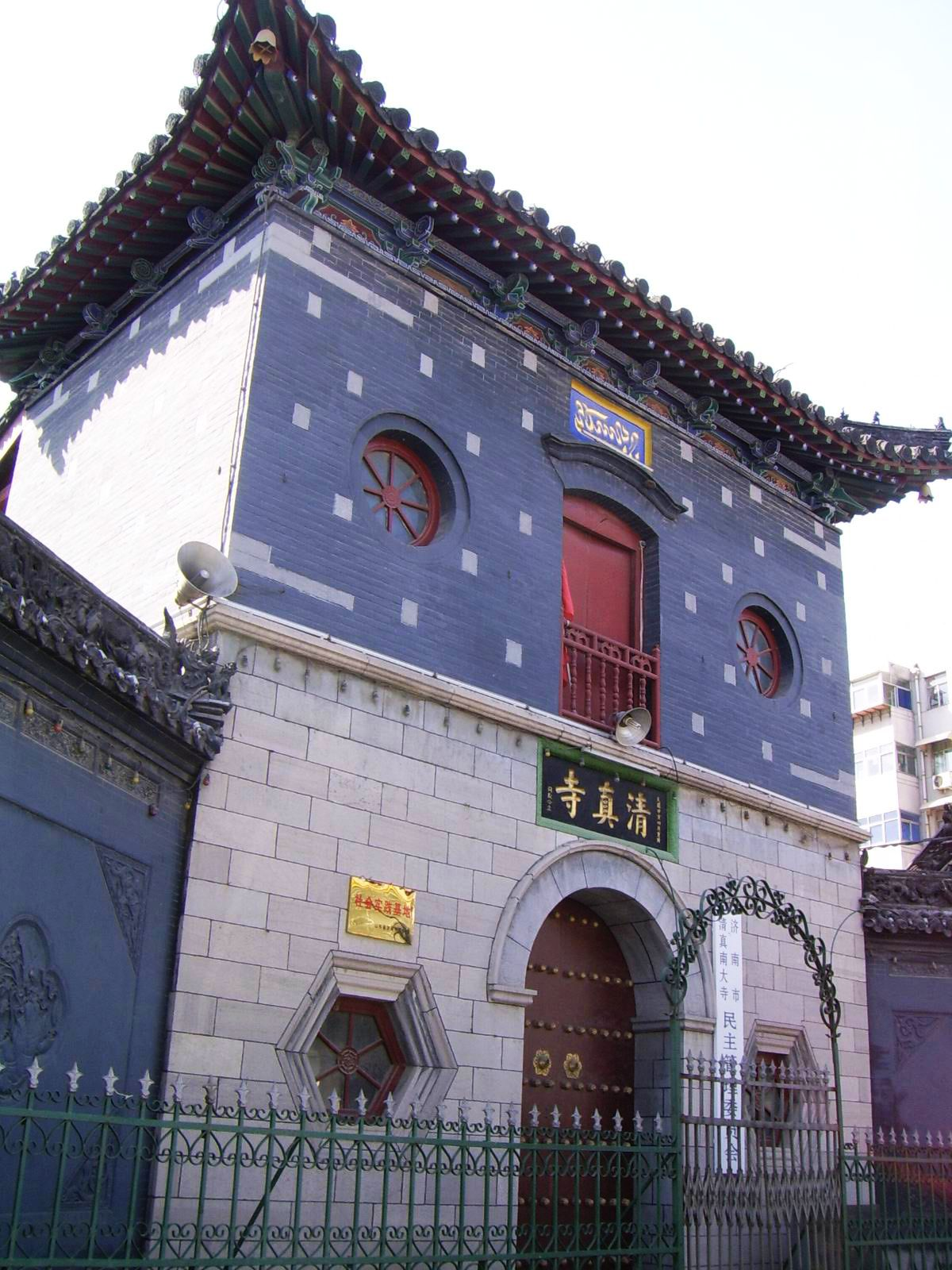
- Jingsi Road Jinan Post Office Hero Hill Monument Greenland Puli Center Shandong Provincial Stadium Shizhong CBD Jinan Great Southern Mosque

- Location in Shandong
- Coordinates: 36°39′10″N 116°59′51″E
- Country: People's Republic of China
- Province: Shandong
- Sub-provincial city: Jinan

Area
  - Total: 374 km^{2} (144 sq mi)

Population (2020 census)
  - Total: 903,714
  - Density: 2,420/km^{2} (6,260/sq mi)
- Time zone: UTC+8 (China Standard)
- Postal code: 250002

Shizhong District (simplified Chinese: 市中区; traditional Chinese: 市中區; pinyin: Shìzhōng Qū) is one of 10 urban districts of the prefecture-level city of Jinan, the capital of Shandong Province, East China, forming part of the city's urban core. It is located to the southwest of the historical city center. It borders the districts of Tianqiao to the north, Lixia to the northeast, Licheng to the east and southeast, Changqing to the southwest, and Huaiyin to the northwest.

The population in 2020 was 903,714.

== Administrative divisions ==
Administrative divisions
17 subdistricts	街道办事处
Ganshiqiao Subdistricts	杆石桥街道办事处
Weijiazhaung Subdistricts	魏家庄街道办事处
Daguanyuan Subdistricts	大观园街道办事处
Luoyuan Subdistricts	泺源街道办事处
Silicun Subdistricts	四里村街道办事处
Liulishan Subdistricts	六里山街道办事处
Qilishan Subdistricts	七里山街道办事处
Shunyulu Subdistricts	舜玉路街道办事处
Shungeng Subdistricts	舜耕街道办事处
Erqixincun Subdistricts	二七新村街道办事处
Baimashan Subdistricts	白马山街道办事处
Wangguanzhuang Subdistricts	王官庄街道办事处
Qixian Subdistricts	七贤街道办事处
Xinglong Subdistricts	兴隆街道办事处
Shiliulihe Subdistricts	十六里河街道办事处
Dangjia Subdistricts	党家街道办事处
Dougou Subdistricts	陡沟街道办事处

== Climate ==
Climate data for Shizhong District, Jinan elevation 117 m (384 ft), (1991–2020 normals, extremes 1951–present)
Month	Jan	Feb	Mar	Apr	May	Jun	Jul	Aug	Sep	Oct	Nov	Dec	Year
Record high °C (°F)	20.2 (68.4)	25.7 (78.3)	30.2 (86.4)	36.3 (97.3)	39.7 (103.5)	41.2 (106.2)	42.5 (108.5)	40.7 (105.3)	38.5 (101.3)	33.7 (92.7)	26.5 (79.7)	23.1 (73.6)	42.5 (108.5)
Mean daily maximum °C (°F)	4.2 (39.6)	8.1 (46.6)	15.2 (59.4)	21.9 (71.4)	27.8 (82.0)	31.9 (89.4)	32.1 (89.8)	30.6 (87.1)	27.1 (80.8)	21.2 (70.2)	13.1 (55.6)	6.0 (42.8)	19.9 (67.9)
Daily mean °C (°F)	−0.3 (31.5)	3.2 (37.8)	9.7 (49.5)	16.2 (61.2)	22.3 (72.1)	26.5 (79.7)	27.4 (81.3)	25.8 (78.4)	21.9 (71.4)	16.0 (60.8)	8.4 (47.1)	1.5 (34.7)	14.9 (58.8)
Mean daily minimum °C (°F)	−3.7 (25.3)	−0.7 (30.7)	5.2 (41.4)	11.3 (52.3)	17.4 (63.3)	21.6 (70.9)	23.4 (74.1)	22.1 (71.8)	17.8 (64.0)	12.0 (53.6)	4.7 (40.5)	−1.8 (28.8)	10.8 (51.4)
Record low °C (°F)	−19.7 (−3.5)	−16.5 (2.3)	−11.3 (11.7)	−1.9 (28.6)	4.2 (39.6)	10.9 (51.6)	14.0 (57.2)	12.8 (55.0)	6.4 (43.5)	0.0 (32.0)	−10.1 (13.8)	−16.0 (3.2)	−19.7 (−3.5)
Average precipitation mm (inches)	7.0 (0.28)	13.2 (0.52)	10.9 (0.43)	35.7 (1.41)	69.5 (2.74)	94.8 (3.73)	177.7 (7.00)	202.4 (7.97)	61.0 (2.40)	30.2 (1.19)	23.7 (0.93)	7.7 (0.30)	733.8 (28.9)
Average precipitation days (≥ 0.1 mm)	2.7	3.9	3.5	5.5	6.7	8.3	12.5	12.5	7.3	5.8	4.4	3.5	76.6
Average snowy days	4.0	3.7	1.1	0.3	0	0	0	0	0	0	1.1	2.3	12.5
Average relative humidity (%)	52	50	43	47	50	54	71	76	67	57	56	54	56
Mean monthly sunshine hours	155.3	153.5	210.7	227.0	255.1	215.5	175.1	173.8	166.3	178.1	158.1	157.1	2,225.6
Percentage possible sunshine	50	50	56	57	58	49	40	42	45	52	52	53	50
Source: China Meteorological Administration
