= 1958 Yellow River flood =

Natural disaster in China

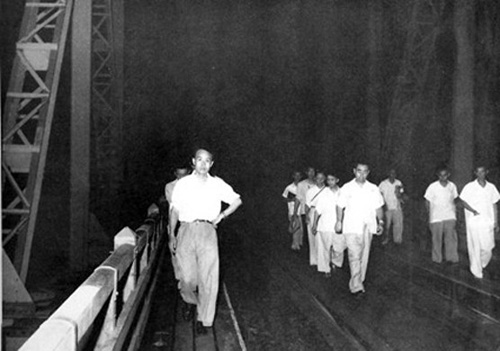
Premier Zhou Enlai visits the Luokou Yellow River Railway Bridge in Jinan, Shandong during the flood on August 6th.

The 1958 Yellow River flood was a flood in China caused by an extraordinarily large rise in the water flow of the Yellow River that coincided with the onset of the Great Leap Forward.

In July 1958, the peak discharge of the Yellow River at Huayuankou was 22,300 m^{3}/s (790,000 cu ft/s) with a maximum sediment concentration of 911 kg/m^{3} (57 lb/cu ft), 14× and 24× their mean annual values, respectively. The flood water level was so high that it rose up to the top of the levee in several places.

This flood affected 741,000 people in China, submerged over half a million acres of crops (3.04 million mu), and destroyed over 300,000 houses in 1708 villages. It was reported as the most severe flood since 1933.

== Details ==
During this flood, records were kept of torrential rains beginning on July 14, and by July 16 exceeding 100mm of rain per day, flooding more than 400 km of the Yellow River and additionally several smaller rivers. Rain continued for more than two weeks, with flooding finally peaking on July 27.

Time: July 1958; Location: Middle and lower reaches of the Yellow River; Disaster type: Flood; Disaster situation: Flood peak flow reached 22,300 cubic meters per second. The Beijing-Guangzhou railway bridge across the Yellow River was interrupted by flooding for 14 days. In the Yellow River beach area and Dongping Lake area of Shandong and Henan provinces alone, 1,708 villages were inundated, 740,800 people were affected, 3.04 million mu of cultivated land was inundated, and 300,000 houses collapsed. A thousand times: the Changyuan impoundment area is about to be used, and millions of Limin people are about to evacuate, and the water situation is changing sharply; Dongping Lake Hongtao jumps the embankment, Huayuankou dam foundation collapses, 2 million people go to the embankment to fight floods; the iron bridge is cut!

From "July 20th to 18:00 on the 17th, the main rain areas are in the main stream of the Sanhua section and the middle and lower reaches of the Yi, Luo, and Qin Rivers, the middle and lower reaches of the Fen River, the Beiru River and Shahe River in the Huaihe River Basin, and the upper Tangbai River in the Han River. The intensity of the heavy rain was heavy, with 249 millimeters of rainfall in the center of the rainstorm."

=== Containment ===
On July 27, the largest torrent of the flood was smoothly directed into the Bohai Sea, and the Chinese government claimed it to be a "victory over the flood". The spokesperson of the Flood Prevention Center of the Chinese government stated on July 27 that:

This year we defeated this large flood without division of torrents or breaks on dams, which secures the big harvest of the crops. This is another miracle created by the Chinese people.
