= Luokou Yellow River Railway Bridge =

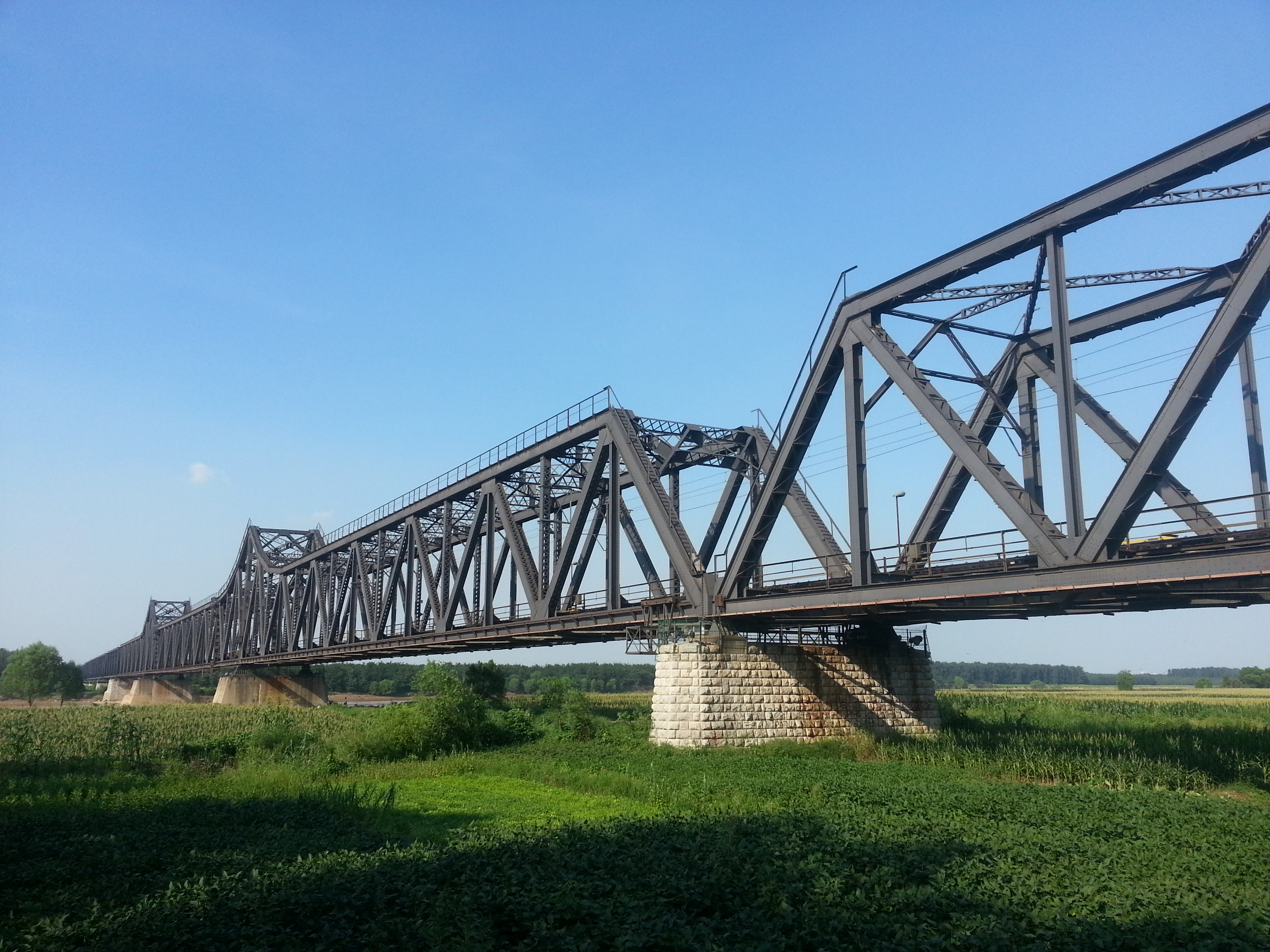
- Coordinates: 36.72685°N 117.00650°E
- Carries: railway
- Crosses: Yellow River
- Locale: Jinan City, Shandong Province, China

Characteristics
- Total length: 1,255.2 metres (4,118 ft)
- Width: 9.4 metres (31 ft)
- Longest span: 164.7 metres (540 ft)

History
- Construction start: October 15, 1909 (groundbreaking)
- Construction end: November 16, 1912

Location
- Interactive map of Luokou Yellow River Railway Bridge

The Luokou Yellow River Railway Bridge (Chinese: 泺口黄河铁路桥; pinyin: Luòkǒu Huánghé Tiělù Qiáo) is a railway bridge across the Yellow River in Jinan, Shandong, China, built in the early 20th century. The bridge represented a major engineering achievement that was unique in the region at the time. The bridge was of great strategic importance during the first half of the 20th century and was repeatedly damaged and repaired as a result.

== Structure ==
The bridge has 11 pillars and 12 spans with a total length of 1,255.2 metres (4,118 ft) and a width 9.4 metres (31 ft).

== History ==
The bridge was a conceived as a key infrastructure element for the Tianjin-Pukou Railway. On January 13, 1908, the Qing government signed the "Tianjin Pukou Railway Loan Agreement". Work on the railway was split between German and British companies. The Luokou Yellow River Railway Bridge was part of the German portion that ran from Tianjin to Hanzhuang in Shandong and had a length of 626 kilometres (389 mi). The site of the bridge was selected after careful exploration and was placed at a site where the course of the Yellow river was constrained by Que Hill to the north and an existing dam to the south.

The bridge was built by MAN (M.A.N.-Werk Gustavsburg bei Mainz), with the contract being signed on August 12, 1908, and the groundbreaking ceremony held on October 15 in the same year. Construction work began in July 1909 and was completed on November 16, 1912, when the official opening ceremony was held. The total construction cost for the bridge was 11.66 million German marks.

In 1928, during the Northern Expedition, the local warlord Zhang Zongchang, an ally of the Manchurian warlord Zhang Zuolin, tried to halt the Kuomintang forces by detonating explosives at the 8th pillar. The pillar was damaged over a length of 3.8 metres (12 ft), but the bridge was repaired within eight months. In 1930, during the Central Plains War the bridge was again damaged by artillery fire exchanged between the troops of Chiang Kai-shek on one side and the troops of Yan Xishan and Feng Yuxiang on the other. The artillery shells damaged many steel beams. In 1931, the Jin-Pu Railway Administration repaired the bridge at a total cost of 26,700 yuan. In November 1937, the bridge was severely damaged again by explosives when the Kuomintang governor Han Fuju tried to halt the advance of the Japanese troops after evacuating his own forces south of the Yellow River. When the Japanese forces attacked the northern bridge head, more than 50 villagers that lived around Que Hill were killed (Chinese: 鹊山惨案; pinyin: Quèshān Cǎn'àn; lit. 'Que-Hill Tragedy'). In January 1938, the repair work on bridge was undertaken by a Japanese car company. The work lasted for six months, cost a total of 3.76 million yuan, and involved 4,000 tonnes (3,900 long tons; 4,400 short tons) of steel. The last time the bridge was damaged in fighting was in February 1949, during Chinese Civil War, when Kuomintang aircraft fired on the bridge and inflicted minor damage that was easily repaired.

The bridge was in danger again during the 1958 Yellow River flood, when Premier Zhou Enlai rushed to Jinan on August 6 to spur on the defense of the bridge. In 1959, a major overhaul of the bridge was undertaken. During the second half of the twentieth century the Beijing–Shanghai railway was gradually duplicated and options for duplication of the tracks at the Yellow River began to be considered in 1958. Although the bridge had originally been designed for two tracks, it was not considered structurally sound to support two tracks. A new bridge, the Caojiaquan Yellow River Bridge to carry the Beijing–Shanghai railway, was completed on 39 June 1976. On 21 April 1991, the bridge was closed for passenger trains, because of the dangers posed by silt that had built up around it. However, in the following year (1992) it was decided to build a new railway line between Jinan and Handan and to investigate further use of the Luokou Yellow River Railway Bridge. As a result, work on reinforcing the bridge began in 1998 and the bridge was again opened to traffic on May 31, 2000.
