= Jinan West railway station =

Railway station in Jinan, Shandong, China

Jinanxi 济南西
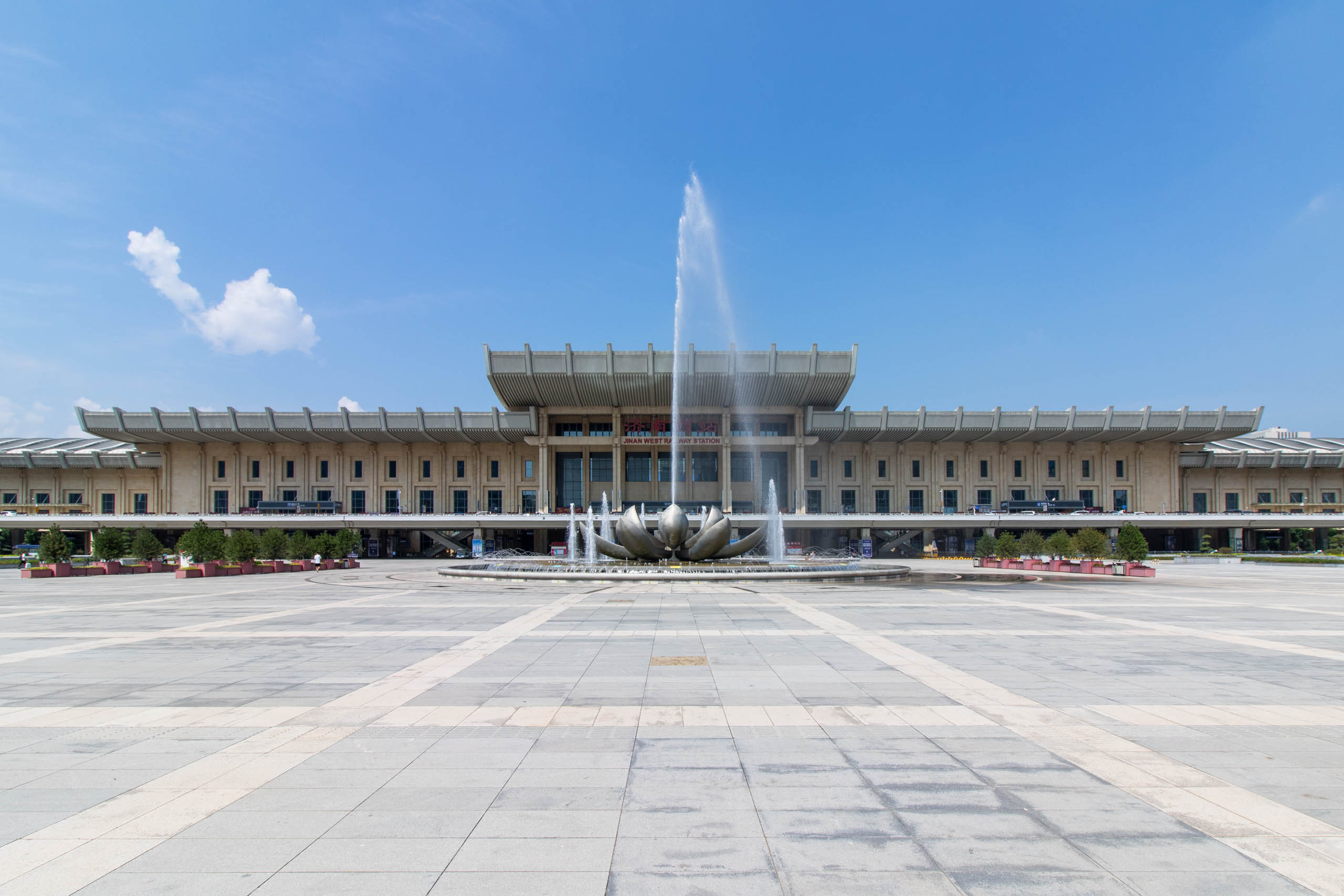

General information
- Other names: Jinan West
- Location: Huaiyin District, Jinan, Shandong; China
- Coordinates: 36°40′08″N 116°53′13″E
- Operated by: CR Jinan; China Railway Corporation
- Lines: Jinghu High-Speed Railway; Shiji Passenger Railway; Zhengzhou–Jinan high-speed railway

Other information
- Station code: TMIS code: 66812; Telegraph code: JGK; Pinyin code: JNX
- Classification: Top Class station

History
- Opened: 30 June 2011; 14 years ago
Location

The Jinan West railway station (simplified Chinese: 济南西站; traditional Chinese: 濟南西站; pinyin: Jǐnánxī Zhàn) is a high-speed railway station in Jinan, the capital of Shandong province, People's Republic of China.

== Overview ==
It is served by the Beijing-Shanghai High Speed Railway and Shijiazhuang-Jinan High Speed Railway which mainly serve Beijing to Shanghai passengers, and was opened for high-speed rail service on 30 June 2011. New services to Ningbo, Fuzhou, Wuhan and Changsha were added on 1 July 2013. The West Railway station is located about 20 kilometers to the west of the city centre of Jinan.

CRH Trains from Beijing to Qingdao, Yantai and Rongcheng call at the central Jinan railway station instead, passing through Jinan West without stopping.

Some CRH trains from eastern Shandong province are diverted to terminate at this station and Jinan East railway station (Jinandong) in order to prevent the relatively small Jinan railway station from overloading during rush hours.

The design of the station accommodates a single entrance for departing passengers at the eastern side of the station. There are exits on the western and eastern sides of Jinan West for arriving passengers. At the departures level, part of the waiting concourse is designated as a VIP waiting area for Business Class passengers, and another portion dedicated for special needs passengers.

The station is on Line 1 of the Jinan Metro.

== Gallery ==
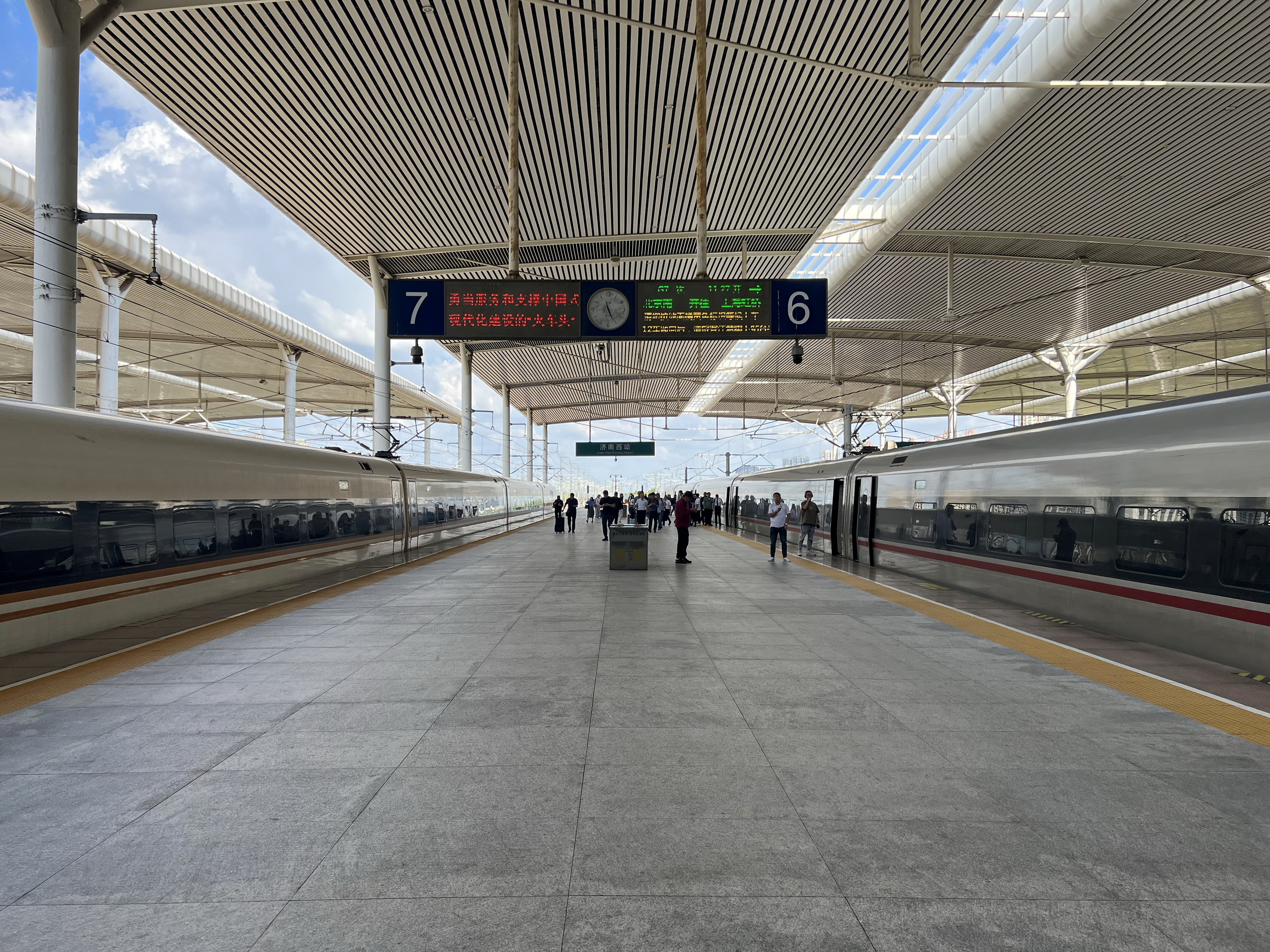
Platform at Jinanxi Railway Station

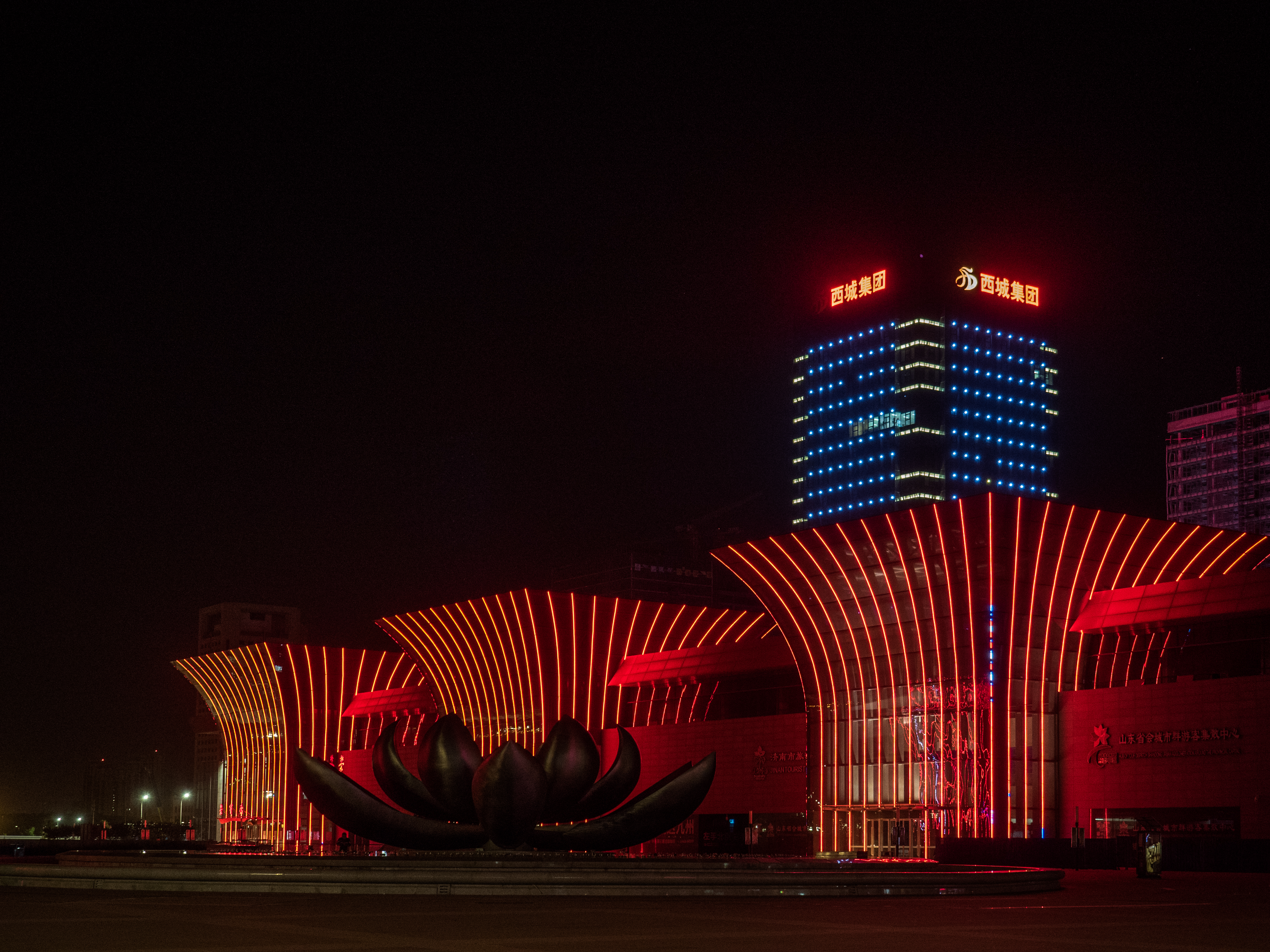
Square in front of the station

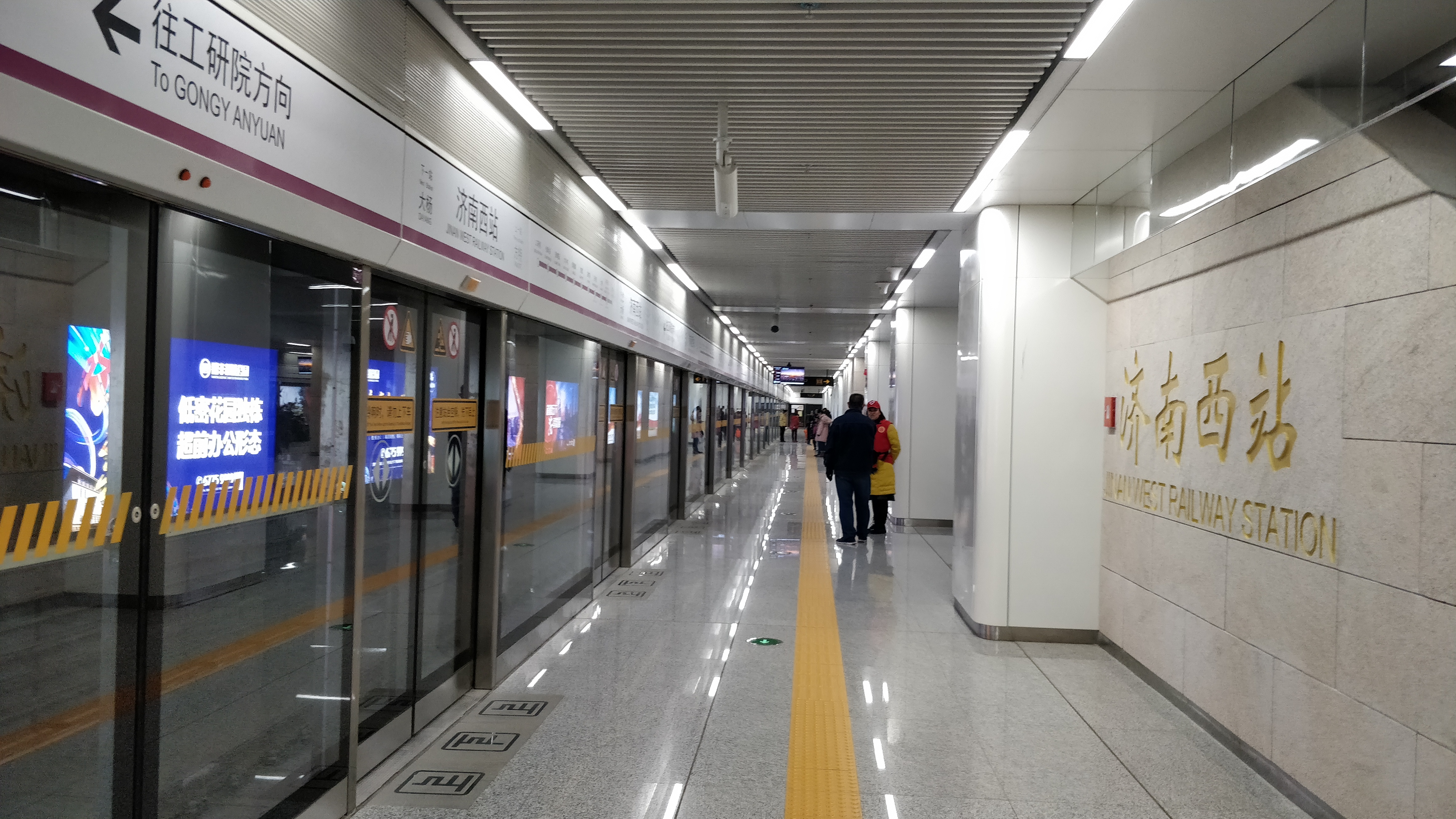
Jinan Metro Jinan West Railway Station

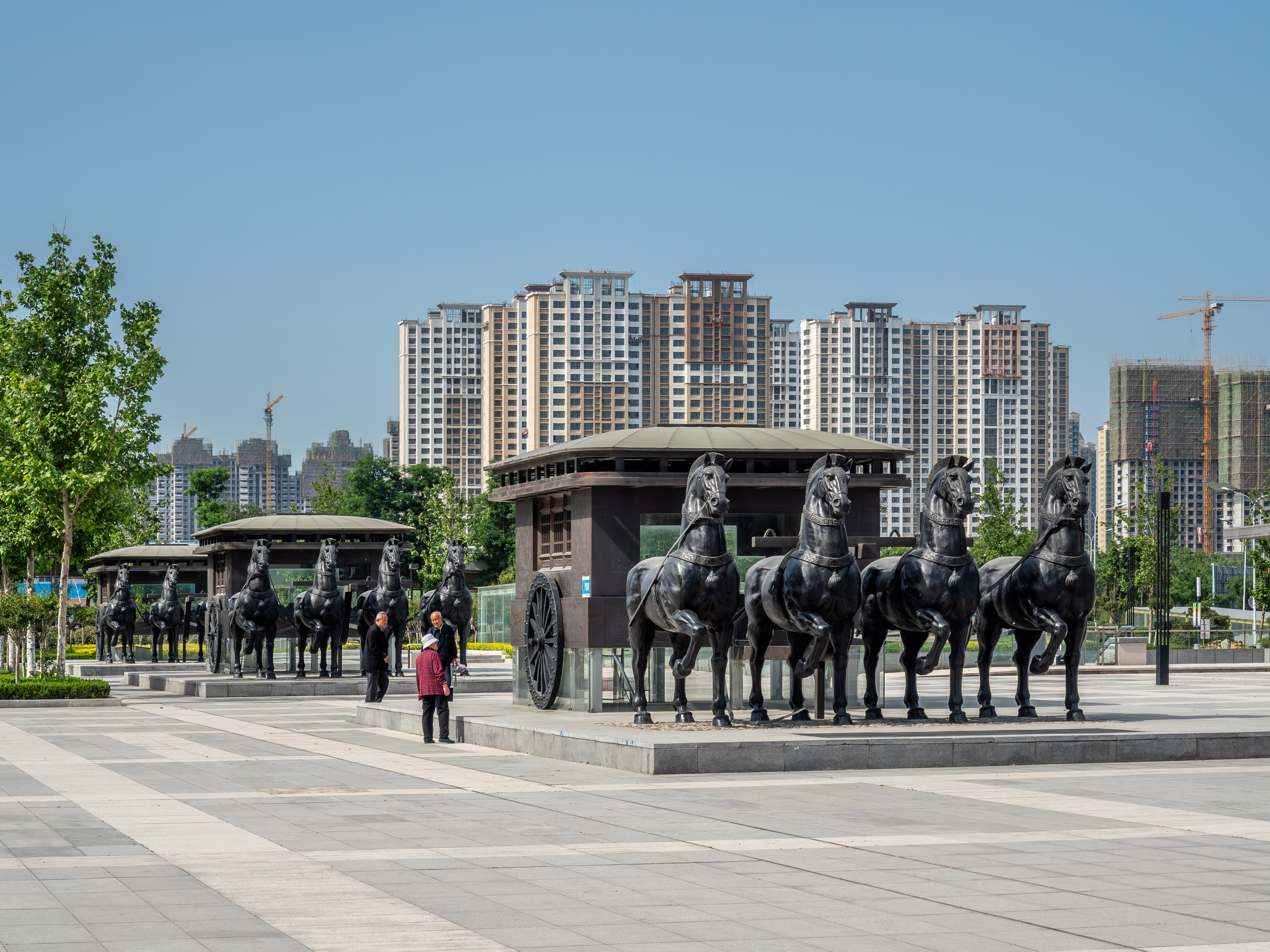
Statue of wagons of ancient Qi state

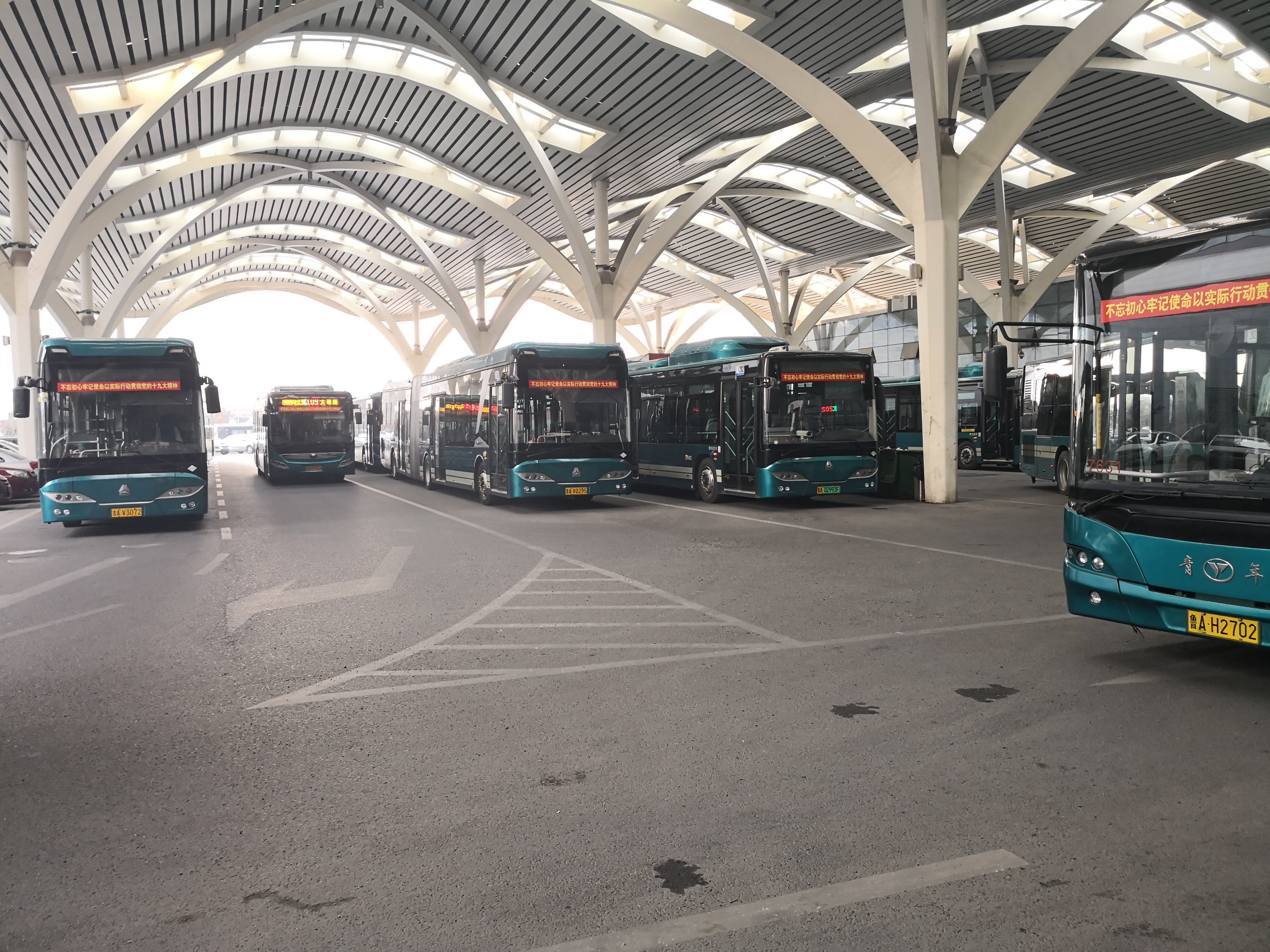
Bus terminal

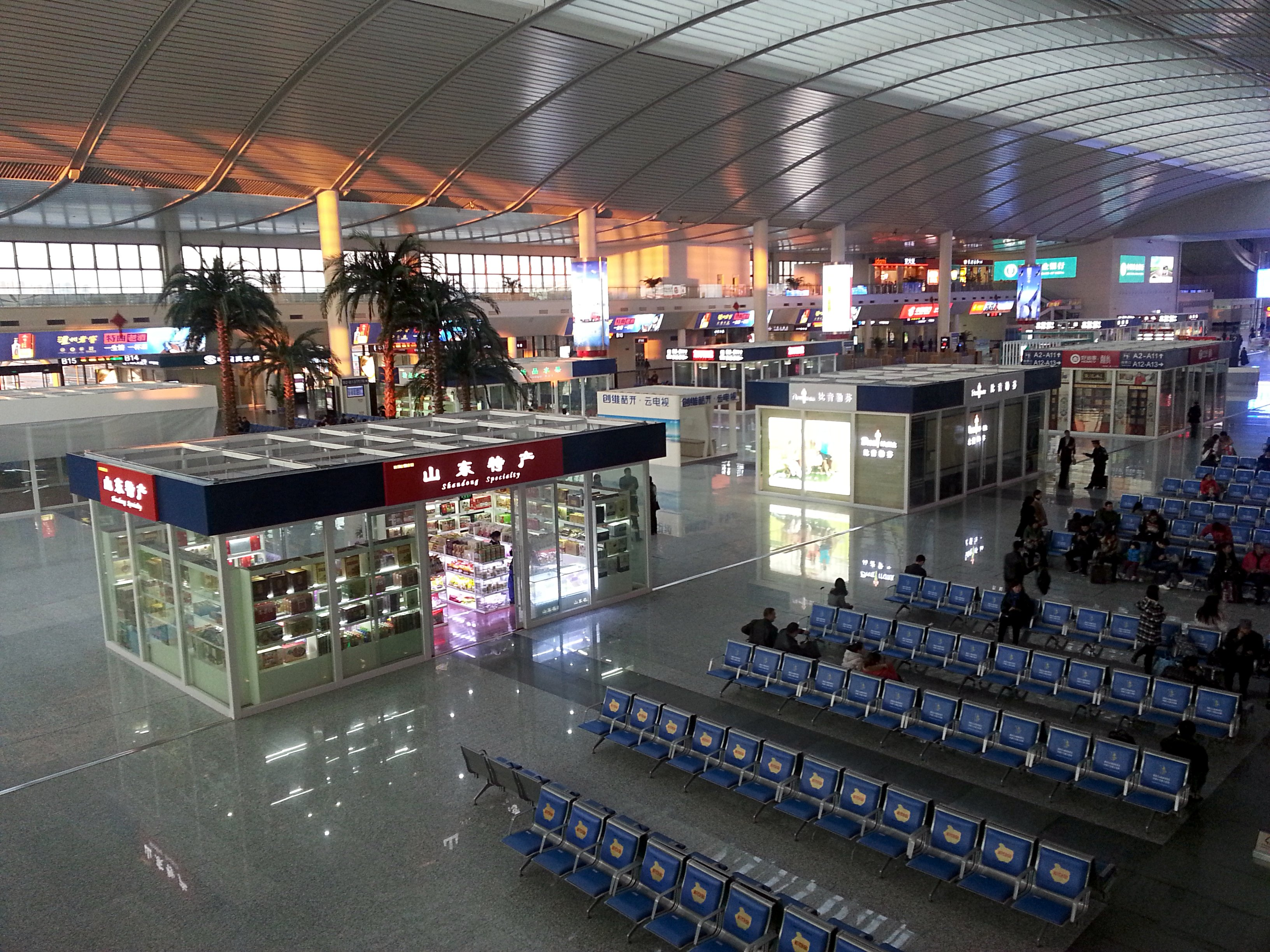
Waiting room

Preceding station	China Railway High-speed	Following station
Dezhou East towards Beijing South or Tianjin West	Beijing–Shanghai high-speed railway Part of the Beijing–Fuzhou high-speed railway	Tai'an towards Shanghai Hongqiao
Dezhou East towards Shijiazhuang	Shijiazhuang–Jinan high-speed railway	Jinan East Terminus
Terminus	Zhengzhou–Jinan high-speed railway	Changqing towards Jinan West
